= Cem (Alevism) =

Communal worship ceremony in Alevism

The central Alevi communal worship service is called a Jem, (Note: Turkish: 'Cem' or 'Âyîn-i Cem', lit. 'mass, gather-together, congregation or assembly meeting') which is performed in special houses called as Cem Evi. Alevi Muslims believe that the Jem has its roots in an original worship and teaching meeting of forty spiritual individuals Kirklar Majlisi (Turkish: Kırklar Meclisi) led by Ali. It takes place in a Cem Evi

== Âyîn-i Cem (cem ceremony) ==
The ceremony's supposed prototype is the narration about Muhammad's nocturnal ascent into heaven, where he beheld a gathering of forty saints (Kırklar Meclisi), and the Divine Reality made manifest in their leader, Ali.

- During the "Jem ceremony" the Âşık plays the bağlama whilst singing spiritual songs, some of which are centuries old and well known amongst Alevis. Every song, called a Nefes has spiritual meaning and aims to teach the participants important lessons. One such song goes thus:

"Learn from your mistakes and be knowledgeable,
Don't look for faults in others,
Look at 73 different people in the same way,
God loves and created them all, so don't say anything against them."

- The love of the creator for the created and vice versa is symbolised in the Cem ceremony by the use of fruit juice and/or red wine [Dem] which represents the intoxication of the lover in the beloved. During the ceremony is Dem one of the twelve duties of the participants.
- At the closing of the cem ceremony the dede who leads the ceremony engages the participants in a discussion, this discussion is called a sohbet.

=== The Semah (Samāh) ===
A family of ritual dances reminiscent of the Sama ceremony of the whirling dervishes characterized by turning and swirling, is an inseparable part of any Cem. Samāh is performed by men and women together, to the accompaniment of the bağlama. The dances symbolize (for example) the revolution of the planets around the Sun (by man and woman turning in circles), and the putting off of one’s self and uniting with Allah.

=== The Görgü Cem ===
The Rite of Integration (görgü cemi) is a complex ritual occasion in which a variety of tasks are allotted to incumbents bound together by extrafamilial brotherhood (Müsahiplik), who undertake a dramatization of unity and integration under the direction of the spiritual leader (dede).

== Twelve services ==
There are twelve services (Turkish: Oniki imamlar) performed by attendees of the Cem:

1. Mürşid or Dede: This is the leader of the Cem who represents Muhammad and Ali. The Dede receives confession from the attendees at the beginning of the ceremony. He also leads funerals, Müsahiplik, marriage ceremonies and circumcisions. The status of Dede is hereditary and he must be a descendant of Ali and Fatima.
2. Rehber "Guide": This position represents Husayn. The Rehber is a guide to the faithful and works closely with the Dede in the community.
3. Gözcü: This position represents Abu Dharr al-Ghifari. S/he is the assistant to the Rehber. S/he is the Cem keeper responsible for keeping the faithful calm.
4. Çerağcı: This position represents Jabir ibn Abd-Allah and s/he is the light-keeper responsible for maintaining the light traditionally given by a lamp or candles.
5. Zakir: This position represents Bilal ibn Rabah. S/he plays the bağlama and recites songs and prayers.
6. Süpürgeci: This position represents Salman the Persian. S/he is responsible for cleaning the Cem Evi (Gathering House) hall and symbolically sweeping the carpets during the Cem.
7. Meydancı: This position represents Hudhayfah ibn al-Yaman.
8. Niyazcı: this position represents Mahmoud ibn Maslamah Al Ansari. S/he is responsible for distributing the sacred meal.
9. İbrikçi: this position represents Kamber. S/he is responsible for washing the hands of the attendees.
10. Kapıcı: this position represents Ghulam Kaysan. S/he is responsible for calling the faithful to the Cem.
11. Peyikçi: this position represents Amri Ayyari.
12. Sakacı: represents Ammar ibn Yasir. Responsible for the distribution of water, sherbet, milk etc...

According to the self-taught Turkish Kurd historian Gürdal Aksoy, most Islamic beliefs and practices whether Sunni, Usuli Shi'ah or the Alevi ones, originally come from Zoroastrianism, according to Aksoy some servants of the cem ceremony share some Zoroastrian counterparts like the Pir and Zaotar priest, Atrevakhsh, Aberet, Sraoshavarez and Fraberetar. However according to Alevis, the cem ceremony originally comes from Prophet Muhammad's nocturnal ascent into heaven .

== See also ==
- Sema
- Samāh
- Holy Du'a
- Ahl-e Haqq Jam in Yarsanism
- Latmiya
