= Kambar =

Kambar may refer to:

- Kambar (given name), a Kazakh male name
- Qəmbərov, a surname
- Kambar (poet), a prominent Tamil language poet, writer and playwright, popularly known for authoring Ramavataram
- Qambar, a city in Sindh, Pakistan

== See also ==
- Kamba (disambiguation)
- Qambar (person), a freed slave of the Islamic caliph Ali
- Chandrashekhara Kambara, an Indian poet
