= British Alevi Federation =

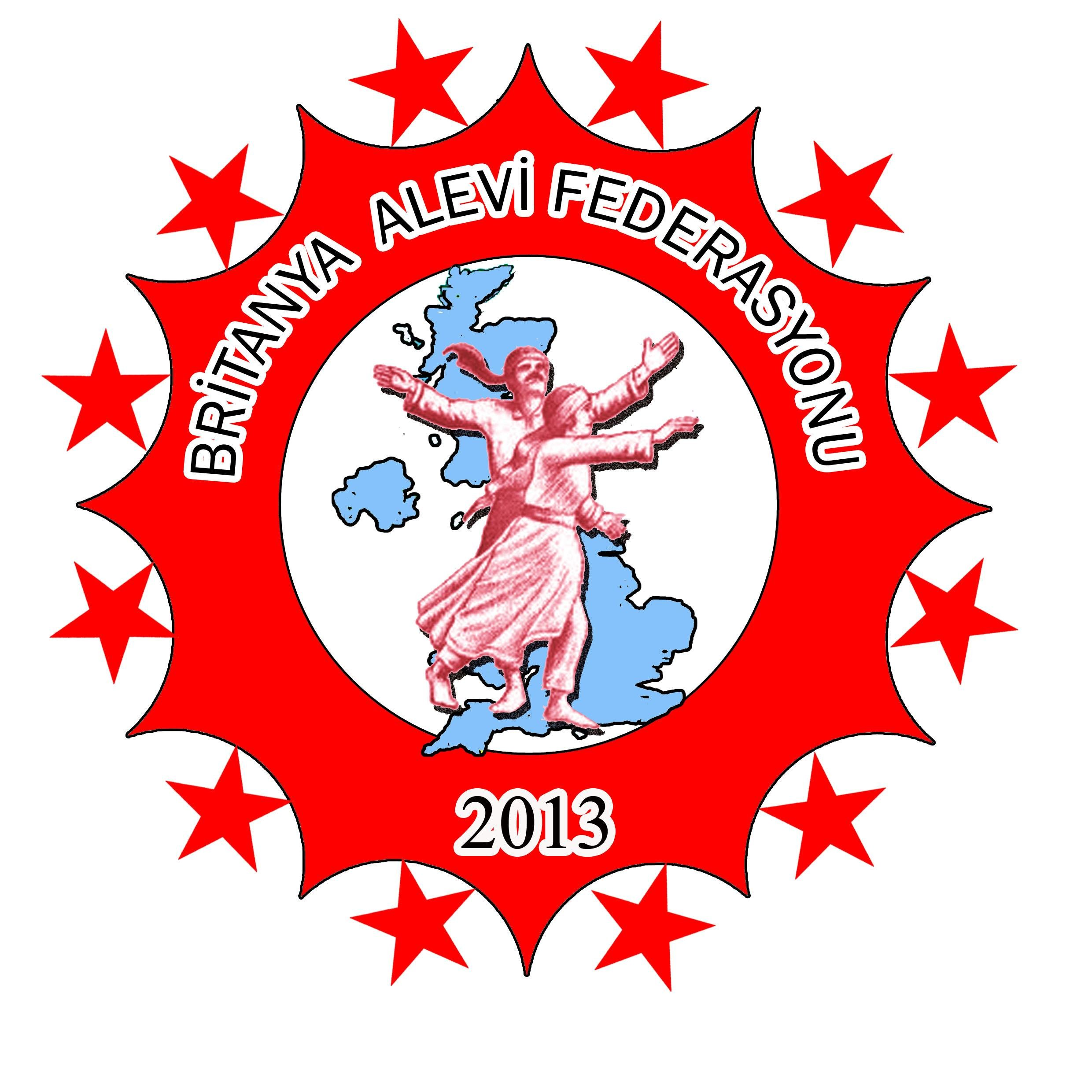

The British Alevi Federation was established in November 2013 as a registered charity in England and Wales. The British Alevi Federation is an umbrella organisation for approximately 26,000 Alevis living in the United Kingdom according to the 2021 UK census. There are over eighteen Alevi Cultural Centres and Cemevis serving people in the UK. These centres are based in Wood Green (London), Glasgow, Leicester, Croydon, Harrow, Northamptonshire, York, Newcastle, Liverpool, Bournemouth, Nottingham, Doncaster, Hull, Sheffield, Edinburgh, Manchester, Newport and Enfield (London).
