= Alevism =

Heterodox Islamic denomination

- Alevilik
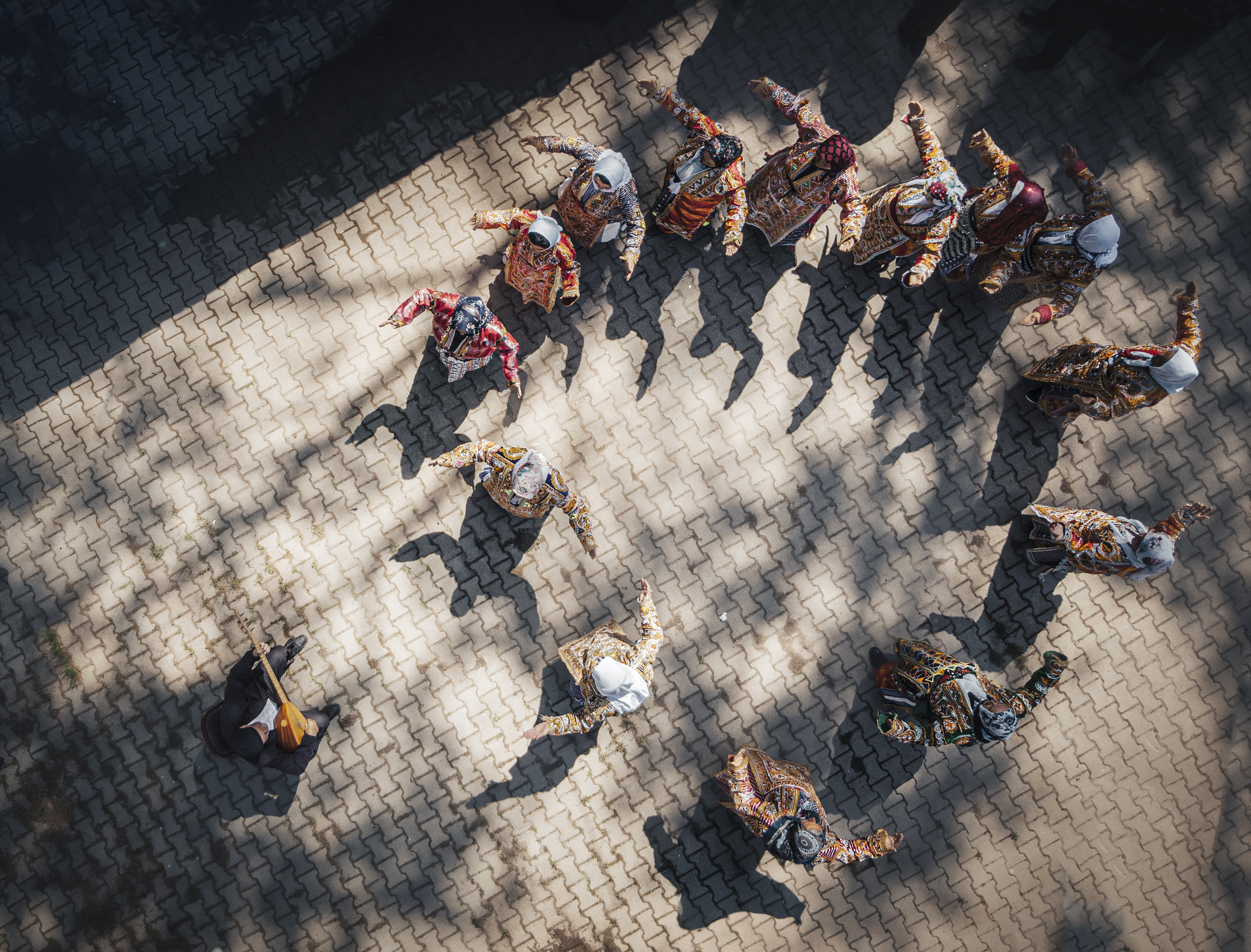
- Women partaking in Semah ritual
- Scripture: Quran, Nahj al-Balagha, Makalat and Buyruks
- Leader: Dede
- Region: Turkey and the Balkans
- Language: Turkish, Kurdish, and Zazaki
- Liturgy: Cem, Semah

Alevism (/æˈlɛvɪzəm/; Turkish: Alevilik; Kurdish: Elewîtî), also known as Qizilbashism, (Note: "Qizilbashism" is generally disliked among Alevis due to being considered a derogatory exonym) is a syncretic and mystic movement, traditionally associated with Haji Bektash Veli. It is generally agreed that it is akin to a Sufi rendition of Twelver Shi'ism that integrates Central Asian shamanic elements, though some dissenting voices base the Alevi belief squarely in a non-denominational, heterodox Anatolian Islam instead. They acknowledge the six articles of faith of Islam, but may differ regarding their interpretation. Lack of gender segregation in ritual contexts and clergy is one of the key features that sets Alevism apart from Muslim orthodoxy.

Although the main order amongst Alevis, the Bektashi order, were appointed as the military chaplains until the Auspicious Incident, historical Qizilbash affiliation created political rifts which caused them to be persecuted both in Ottoman and modern Turkish regimes, being described as heterodox to contrast them with the "orthodox" Sunni majority.

Adherents of Alevism are found primarily in Turkey and estimates of the percentage of Turkey's population that are Alevi include between 4% and 15%. The term “Alevi-Bektashi” is currently a widely and frequently used expression in the religious discourse of Turkey as an umbrella term for the culture of Alevism and the order of Bektashi. Alevism is officially recognized through the Ministry of Culture and Tourism under the 'Presidency of Alevi/Bektashi Culture'.

== Beliefs ==
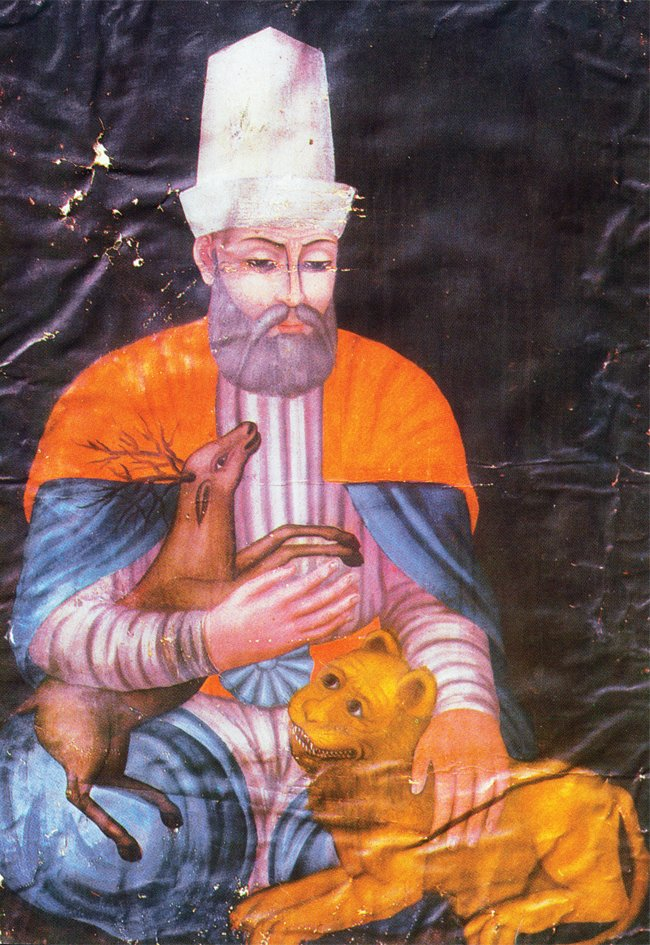
A 15th century illustration of Haji Bektash Veli

According to scholar Soner Çağaptay, Alevism is a "relatively unstructured interpretation of Islam with traditional elements". Journalist Patrick Kingsley states that for some self-described Alevi, their religion is "simply a cultural identity, rather than a form of worship". It has also been put forward that Alevism can be identified as an ethnoreligion in some instances, such as in the cases of the Tahtacıs and Abdals.

Alevis put the doctrine of İnsan-ı Kâmil in the center of their beliefs. The "three sunnahs and seven fards" constitute the fundamental ethical and initiatory framework of the Alevi path, mandating the murids mastery over their actions, speech, and desires (controlling the hand, tongue, and loins) alongside strict adherence to esoteric duties such as absolute submission to spiritual authority, the maintenance of müsahiplik, and the preservation of communal secrets. The Alevi beliefs among the Turkish and Kurdish diverge as Kurdish Alevism put more emphasis on Pir Sultan Abdal than Haji Bektash Veli, and it is rooted more in nature veneration.

The vast majority of Alevis adhere to the Bektashi order whilst some follow other heterodox Sufi orders such as the Kalenderi order.

=== God ===
In Alevi cosmology, God is also called Hak (the Truth) or referred to as Allah. God created life, so the created world can reflect his Being. Alevis believe in the unity of Allah, Muhammad, and Ali, but this is not a trinity composed of God and the historical figures of Muhammad and Ali. Rather, Muhammad and Ali are representations of Allah's light (and not of Allah himself), being neither independent from God nor separate characteristics of him.

In Alevi writings there are many references to the unity of Muhammad and Ali, such as "Ali Muhammed'dir uh dur fah'ad, Muhammad Ali" ("Ali is Muhammad, Muhammad is Ali").

==== Wahdat al-wujud and panentheism ====
The plurality in nature is attributed to the infinite potential energy of Nefs-i Kul when it takes corporeal form as it descends into being from the god. The Alevi concept of God is derived from the philosophy of Ibn Arabi and involves a chain of emanation from God, to spiritual man, earthly man, animals, plants, and minerals. In keeping with the central belief of Wahdat al-mawjud and Wahdat al-wujud, the Alevis base their practices and rituals on their mystical interpretation and perennial philosophy.

=== Spirits and afterlife ===
Alevis believe in the immortality of the soul, the literal existence of supernatural beings, including good angels (melekler) and bad angels (şeytanlar), as encouragers of humans' evil desires (nefs), jinn (cinler), and the evil eye.

Angels feature in Alevi cosmogony. Although there is no fixed creation narrative among Alevis, it is generally accepted that God created five archangels, who have been invited to the chamber of God. Inside, they found a light representing the light of Muhammad and Ali. In an account parallel to that in the Quran, one of the archangels refuses to prostrate before the light, arguing that the light is a created body just like him and therefore an inappropriate object of worship. He remains at God's service, but rejects the final test and turns back to darkness. From this primordial decline, the devil's enmity towards Adam emerged. The archangels consist of the same four archangels as in orthodox Islam. The fifth archangel, namely Azâzîl, fell from grace, thus not included among the canonical archangels apart from this story.

Another story features the archangel Gabriel (Cebrail), who is asked by God who they are. Gabriel answers: "I am I and you are you". Gabriel gets punished for his haughty answer and is sent away, until Ali reveals a secret to him. When God asks him again, he answers: "You are the creator and I am your creation". Afterwards, Gabriel was accepted and introduced to Muhammad and Ali.

=== Scriptures and main figures ===
Alevis acknowledge the four revealed scriptures also recognised in Islam: the Tawrat (Torah), the Zabur (Psalms), the Injil (Gospel), and the Quran. Additionally, Alevis are not opposed to looking to other religious books outside the four major ones as sources for their beliefs, including Hadiths, Nahjul Balagha, and Buyruks. Alevism also acknowledges the Islamic prophet Mohammed. Alevis do not regard interpretations of the Qur'an today as binding or infallible, since the true meaning of the Quran is considered to be taken as a secret by Ali and must be taught by a teacher, who transmits the teachings of Ali (Buyruk) to his disciple.

The Twelve Imams are part of another common Alevi belief. Each Imam represents a different aspect of the world. They are realized as twelve services or On İki Hizmet performed by members of the Alevi community. Each Imam is believed to be a reflection of Ali ibn Abu Talib, the first Imam of the Shi'ites. There are references to the "First Ali" (Birinci Ali), Imam Hasan the "Second 'Ali" (İkinci Ali), and so on up to the "Twelfth 'Ali" (Onikinci Ali), Imam Mehdi. The Twelfth Imam is hidden and represents the Messianic Age.

The Seven Great Poets are poets and poets who explained the initial Alevi belief to the people with the sayings they say and convey messages through written and oral literature from the period they lived in to the present, one of whom is a ruler and the others are from the people. Some additional main figures from the genesis era include; Ahmad Yasawi, Sarı Saltık, Ahi Evran and Abdal Musa.

The saints are called Erenler (lit. 'Englightened Ones') who usually have türbes (shrine) and are venerated in certain days. They mostly have the honorifics of 'Abdal' (e.g. Kaygusuz Abdal), 'Baba' (e.g. Otman Baba), 'Kalender' (e.g. Kalender Çelebi) or 'Veli' (e.g. Hacı Bayram Veli). In modern times, people who are influential take the honorifics of either 'Pir' (male) or 'Ana' (female), depending on their genders. Some famous examples of saints include; Yunus Emre, Sheikh Bedreddin, Balım Sultan and Gül Baba.

=== Jurisprudence ===
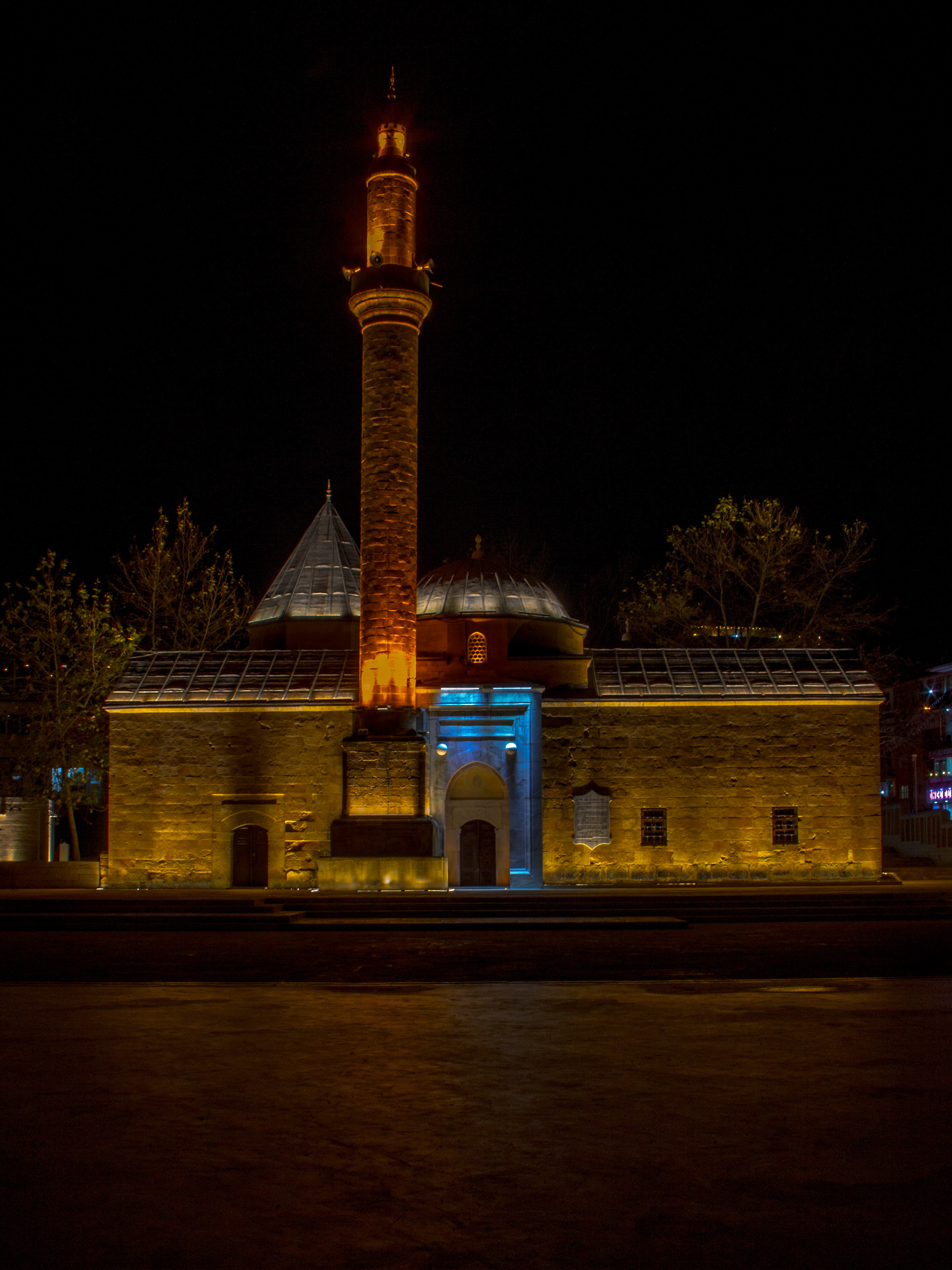
Tomb of Ahi Evren; founder and leader of the Ahi Brotherhood, which evolved into a Beylik later on

Sources differ on how important formal doctrine is among contemporary Alevi. According to scholar Russell Powell, there is a tradition of informal "Dede" courts within the Alevi society, but regarding Islamic jurisprudence or fiqh there has been "little scholarship on Alevi influences" in it. Alevism has a unique belief system tracing back to Kaysanites and Khurramites.

=== Other elements ===
It is widely agreed upon that Shamanism has been a shaping factor in Alevism, especially in clerical and ritual practices. Some other concepts such as the nature worship and certain social values are also thought to be an outcome of Central Asian imprint. Some research also speculates that there is some Christian input, in the form of Christian mysticism. There are some other practices and ceremonies that share similarity with other faiths, such as a Eucharist-like ritual meal (muhabbet) and yearly confession of sins to a baba.

There is some tension between folk tradition/Anatolian Aleviness and the Bektashi Order, whereas Alevis put emphasis on folk elements whilst the order is more liturgy oriented. In certain Turkish communities other Sufi orders (the Halveti-Jerrahi and some of the Rifaʽi) have incorporated significant Alevi influence.

Ishikism (Işıkçılık), is a new syncretic religious movement among Alevis who have developed an alternative understanding of Alevism and its history. These alternative interpretations and beliefs were inspired by Turkish writer Erdoğan Çınar. The Ishik movement claim that the term "Alevi" is derived from the old Anatolian Luvians, claiming that the word "Luvi" means "People of Light" in the Hittite language. Some Ottoman documents from the 16th century refer to the ancestors of today's Alevis as "Işık Taifesi", meaning "People of Light". This is, according to Ishikīs, a proof of the connection between the Luvians and Alevis. These theories, while central to Ishikism, have widely been considered pseudo-history.

In the diaspora, a secularised redefinition of Alevi identity has emerged and become widespread in recent decades, often described as Ali’siz Alevilik (‘Alevism without Ali’), This formulation distanced Alevism from Islamic elements, aligning it more closely with a Marxist-humanist worldview that foregrounded ethics, social justice and resistance.

== Practices ==
The Alevi spiritual path (yol) is commonly understood to take place through four major life-stages, or "gates". These may be further subdivided into "four gates, forty levels" (Dört Kapı Kırk Makam). The first gate (religious law) is considered elementary (and this may be perceived as subtle criticism of other Muslim traditions).

Krisztina Kehl-Bodrogi reports that the Tahtacı identify müsahiplik with the first gate şeriat ("the way"), since they regard it as a precondition for the second tarikat ("the order"). Those who attain to the third gate marifat, ("gnosis") must have been in a müsahiplik relationship for at least twelve years. Entry into the third gate dissolves the müsahiplik relationship (which otherwise persists unto death), in a ceremony called Öz Verme Âyini ("ceremony of relinquishing the self"). The value corresponding to the second gate (and necessary to enter the third) is âşinalık ("intimacy"). Its counterpart for the third gate is called peşinelik; for the fourth gate hâkikat (the truth). Most Alevi activity takes place in the context of the second gate (spiritual brotherhood), during which one submits to a living spiritual guide (dede, pir, mürşid). The existence of the third and fourth gates is mostly theoretical, though some older Alevis have apparently received initiation into the third.

There are major crimes that cause an Alevi to be declared düşkün (shunned).

=== Hierarchy ===
The clergy is totally different from mainstream Islam and takes its roots from Sufism and Tengrism. Bektashism is initiatic and members must traverse various levels or ranks as they progress along the spiritual path to the Reality. First level members are called aşıks (lit. bards). They are those who, while not having taken initiation into the order, are nevertheless drawn to it. Following initiation (called nasip) one becomes a mühip (lit. lover). After some time as a mühip, one can take further vows and become a dervish.

The next level above dervish is that of baba. The baba (lit. father) is considered to be the head of a tekke and qualified to give spiritual guidance (irşad). Above the baba is the rank of dede (lit. grandfather). Teachings are passed on by a dede, instead of an imam. Traditionally there were twelve of these, the most senior being the "dedebaba" (great-grandfather).

The dedebaba was considered to be the highest-ranking authority in the Bektashi Order. Traditionally the residence of the dedebaba was the Pir Evi (The Saint's Home) which was located in the Haji Bektash Veli Complex in Turkey and currently in Bektashi World Center in Albania.

=== Cem and Cemevi ===
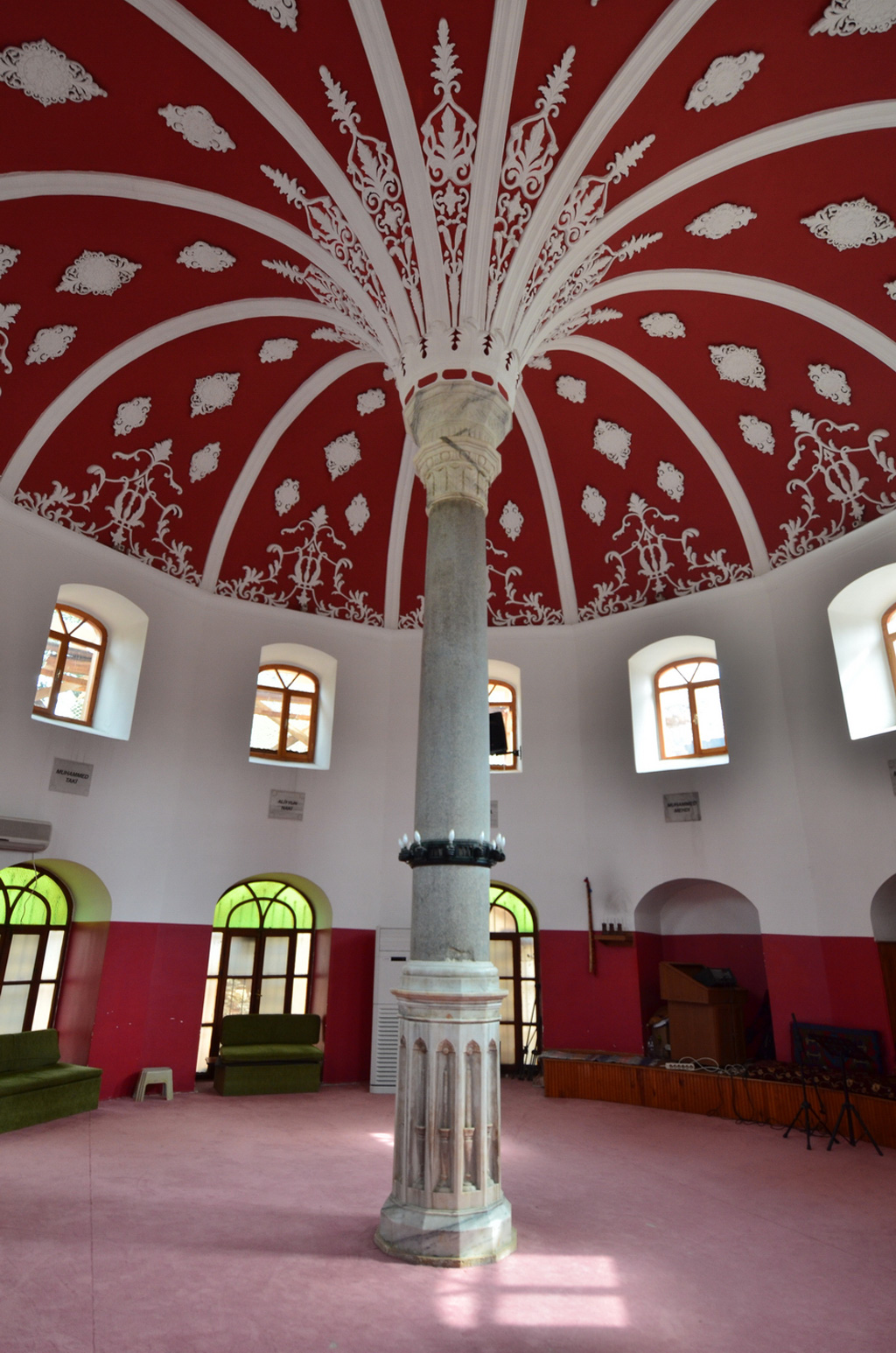
Interior of Şahkulu Cemevi

Alevi religious, cultural and other social activities take place in the cemevi "assembly house". The ceremony's prototype is the Muhammad's nocturnal ascent into heaven, where he beheld a gathering of forty saints (Kırklar Meclisi), and the ultimate reality made manifest in their leader, Ali.

The Cem is the gathering for ritualistic reasons which features music, singing, and dancing in which both women and men participate. Rituals are performed in Turkish, Zazaki, Kurmanji and other local languages.

During the Cem, the Aşık plays the bağlama whilst singing spiritual songs, some of which are centuries old and well known amongst Alevis. Every song, called a nefes, has spiritual meaning and aims to teach the participants essential lessons.

==== Twelve services ====
There are twelve services (Turkish: On İki hizmet) performed by the twelve ministers of the cem.

1. Dede: This is the leader of the Cem who represents Muhammad and Ali. The Dede receives confession from the attendees at the beginning of the ceremony. He also leads funerals, Müsahiplik, marriage ceremonies and circumcisions. The status of Dede is hereditary and he must be a descendant of Ali and Fatima.
2. Rehber: This position represents Husayn. The Rehber is a guide to the faithful and works closely with the Dede in the community.
3. Gözcü: This position represents Abu Dharr al-Ghifari. S/he is the assistant to the Rehber. S/he is the Cem keeper responsible for keeping the faithful calm.
4. Çerağcı: This position represents Jabir ibn Abd-Allah and s/he is the light-keeper responsible for maintaining the light traditionally given by a lamp or candles.
5. Zakir: This position represents Bilal ibn al-Harith. S/he plays the bağlama and recites songs and prayers.
6. Süpürgeci: This position represents Salman the Persian. S/he is responsible for cleaning the Cemevi hall and symbolically sweeping the carpets during the Cem.
7. Meydancı: This position represents Hudhayfah ibn al-Yaman.
8. Niyazcı: this position represents Muhammad ibn Maslamah. S/he is responsible for distributing the sacred meal.
9. İbrikçi: this position represents Kamber. S/he is responsible for washing the hands of the attendees.
10. Kapıcı: this position represents Ghulam Kaysan. S/he is responsible for calling the faithful to the Cem.
11. Peyikçi: this position represents Amri Ayyari.
12. Sakacı: represents Ammar ibn Yasir. Responsible for the distribution of water, sherbet (sharbat), milk etc..

=== Rituals ===
Alevis use Turkish rather than Arabic for their religious ceremonies and literature. A family of ritual dances characterized by turning and swirling is inseparable from the cem. The Semah is performed by men and women together to accompany the bağlama. The dances symbolize (for example) the revolution of the planets around the Sun by people turning in circles, and the putting off of the self and uniting with God.

The Rite of Admission (ikrar cemi) is the initiation ritual when somebody born or converts into Alevism.

The Rite of Integration (görgü cemi) is a complex ritual occasion in which a variety of tasks are allotted to incumbents bound together by extrafamilial brotherhood (müsahiplik). These incumbents undertake a dramatisation of unity and integration under the direction of the dede.

The love of the creator for the created and vice versa is symbolised in the Cem by the use of fruit juice and/or red wine. Dem represents the intoxication of the lover in the beloved. During the ceremony Dem is one of the twelve duties of the participants.

At the closing of the cem ceremony, the dede who leads the ceremony engages the participants in a discussion called a sohbet.

=== Festivals ===
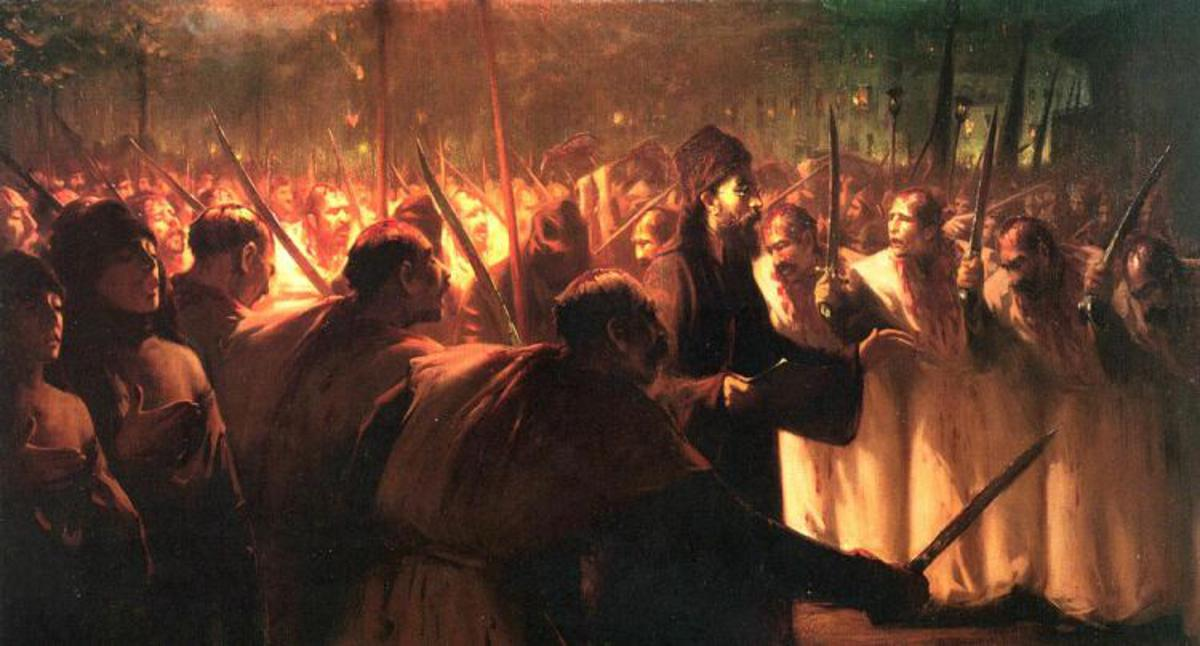
10th of Muharram – Ashura: Husayn was martyred at Karbala. The Mourning of Muharram and the remembrance of this event by Ja'faris and Alevis together in Ottoman Empire. Painted by Fausto Zonaro.

Alevis celebrate and commemorate Ali's birth, his wedding with Fatima, the rescue of Yusuf from the well, and the creation of the world on this day. Various cems and special programs are held.

==== Muharram ====
The Muslim month of Muharram begins 20 days after Eid ul-Adha (Kurban Bayramı). Alevis observe a fast for the first twelve days, known as the Mourning of Muharram (Turkish: Muharrem Mâtemi, Yâs-ı Muharrem, or Mâtem Orucu; Kurdish: Rojîya Şînê or Rojîya Miherremê). This culminates in the festival of Ashura (Aşure), which commemorates the martyrdom of Husayn at Karbala. The fast is broken with a special dish called aşure from a variety (often twelve) of fruits, nuts, and grains. Many events are associated with this celebration, including the salvation of Husayn's son Ali al-Sajjad from the massacre at Karbala, thus allowing the bloodline of the family of Muhammad to continue.

==== Hıdırellez ====
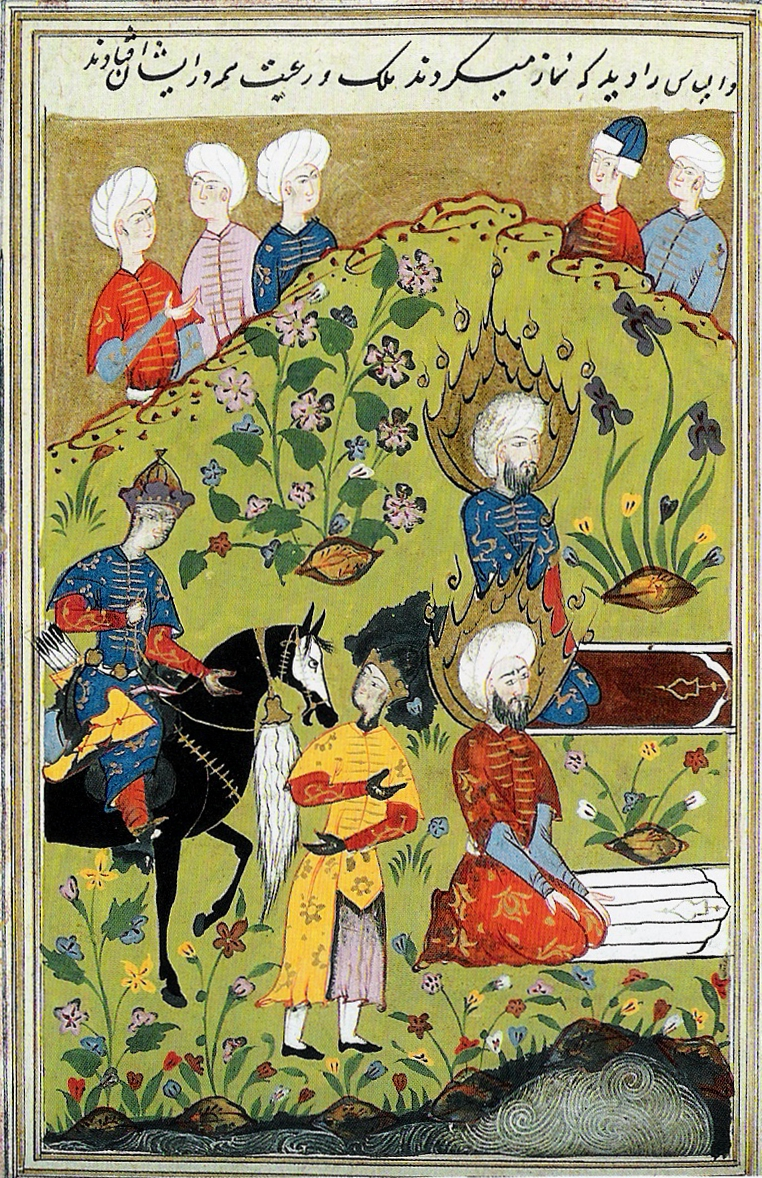
A Persian miniature depicting Elijah and al-Khiḍr (A miniature version of Stories of the Prophets)

Hıdırellez honors the mysterious figure Khidr (Turkish: Hızır) who is sometimes identified with Saint George, and is said to have drunk of the water of life. Some hold that Khidr comes to the rescue of those in distress on land, while Elijah (Ilyas) helps those at sea; and that they meet at a rose tree in the evening of every 6 May. The festival is also celebrated in parts of the Balkans by the name of "Erdelez," where it falls on the same day as George's Day in Spring or Saint George's Day.

Khidr is also honored with a three-day fast in mid-February called Hızır Orucu. In addition to avoiding any sort of comfort or enjoyment, Alevis also abstain from food and water for the entire day, though they do drink liquids other than water during the evening.

Note that the dates of the Khidr holidays can differ among Alevis, most of whom use a lunar calendar, but some a solar calendar.

==== Müsahiplik ====
Müsahiplik (roughly, "Companionship") is a covenant relationship between two men of the same age, preferably along with their wives. In a ceremony in the presence of a dede the partners make a lifelong commitment to care for the spiritual, emotional, and physical needs of each other and their children. The ties between couples who have made this commitment is at least as strong as it is for blood relatives, so much so that müsahiplik is often called spiritual brotherhood (manevi kardeşlik). The children of covenanted couples may not marry.

=== Folk practices ===
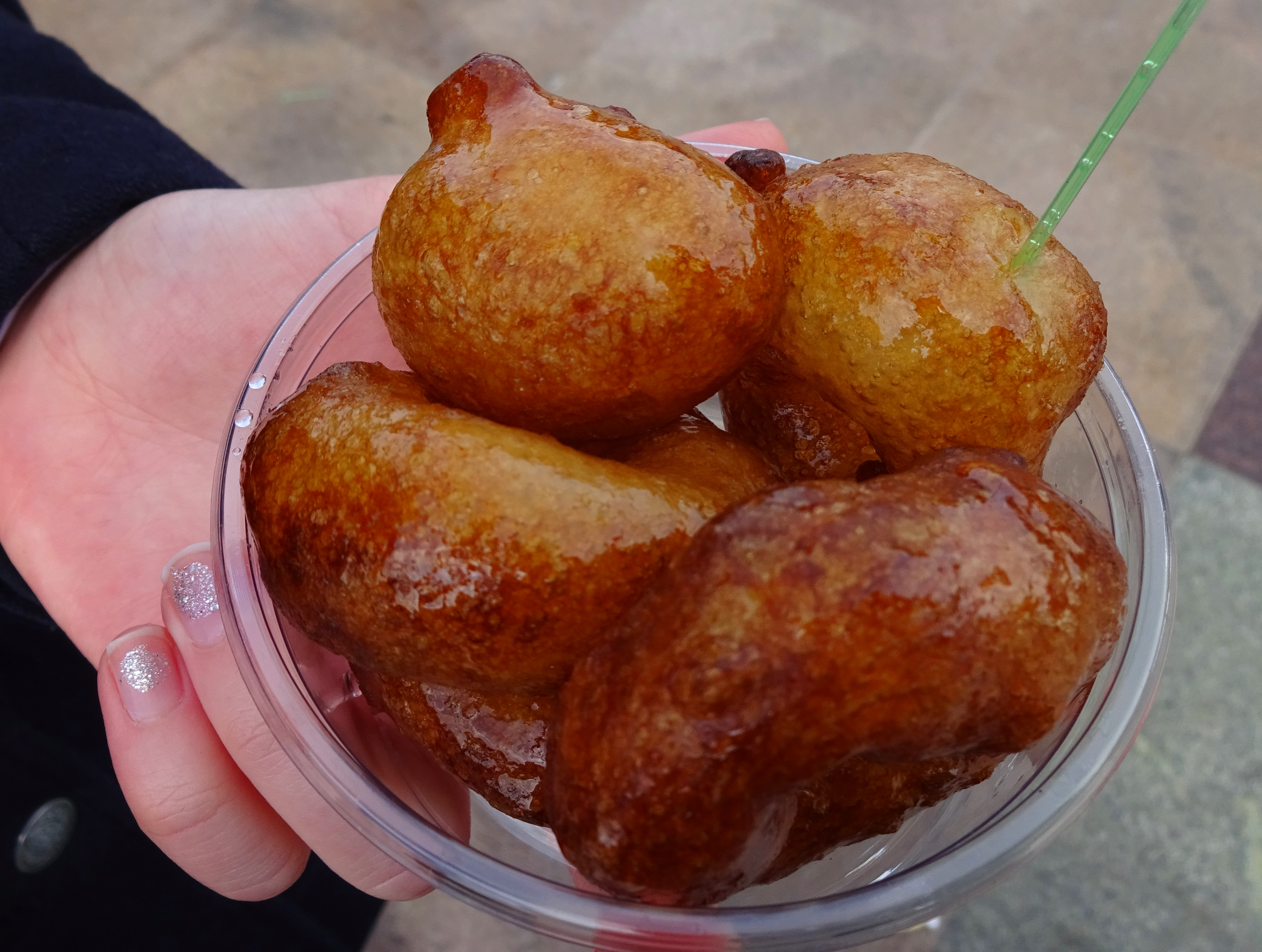

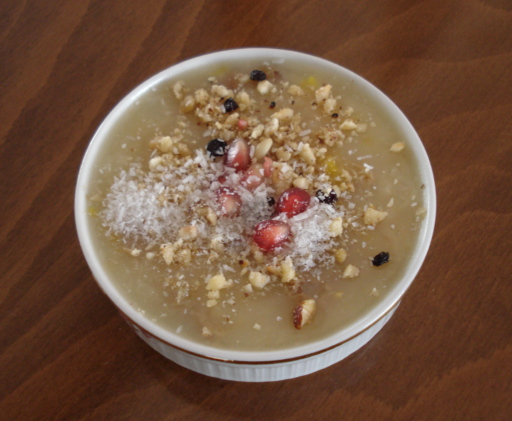
It is a common Alevi tradition to distribute lokma (top) and ashure (below) publicly in Turkey.

Many folk practices may be identified, though few of them are specific to the Alevis. In this connection, scholar Martin van Bruinessen notes a sign from Turkey's Ministry of Religion, attached to Istanbul's shrine of Eyüp Sultan, which presents:

...a long list of 'superstitious' practices that are emphatically declared to be non-Islamic and objectionable, such as lighting candles or placing 'wishing stones' on the tomb, tying pieces of cloth to the shrine or to the trees in front of it, throwing money on the tomb, asking the dead directly for help, circling seven times around the trees in the courtyard or pressing one's face against the walls of the türbe in the hope of a supernatural cure, tying beads to the shrine and expecting supernatural support from them, sacrificing roosters or turkeys as a vow to the shrine. The list is probably an inventory of common local practices the authorities wish to prevent from re-emerging.

Other, similar practices include kissing door frames of holy rooms; not stepping on the threshold of holy buildings; seeking prayers from reputed healers; and making lokma and sharing it with others. Also, Ashure is made and shared with friends and family during the month of Muharram in which the Day of Ashure takes place.

==== Visitations ====
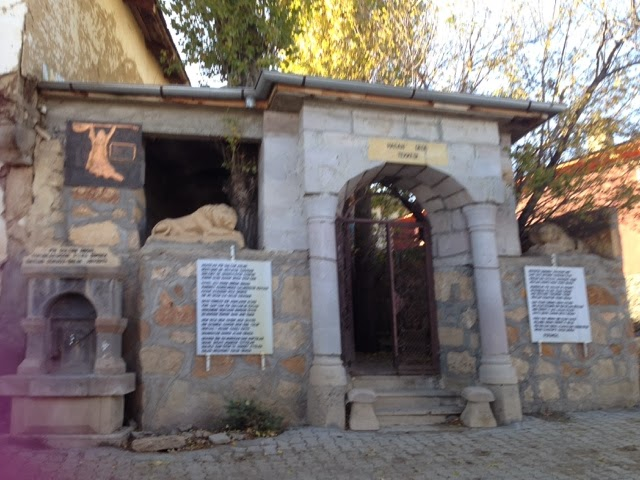
The tomb of Pir Sultan Abdal in Sivas

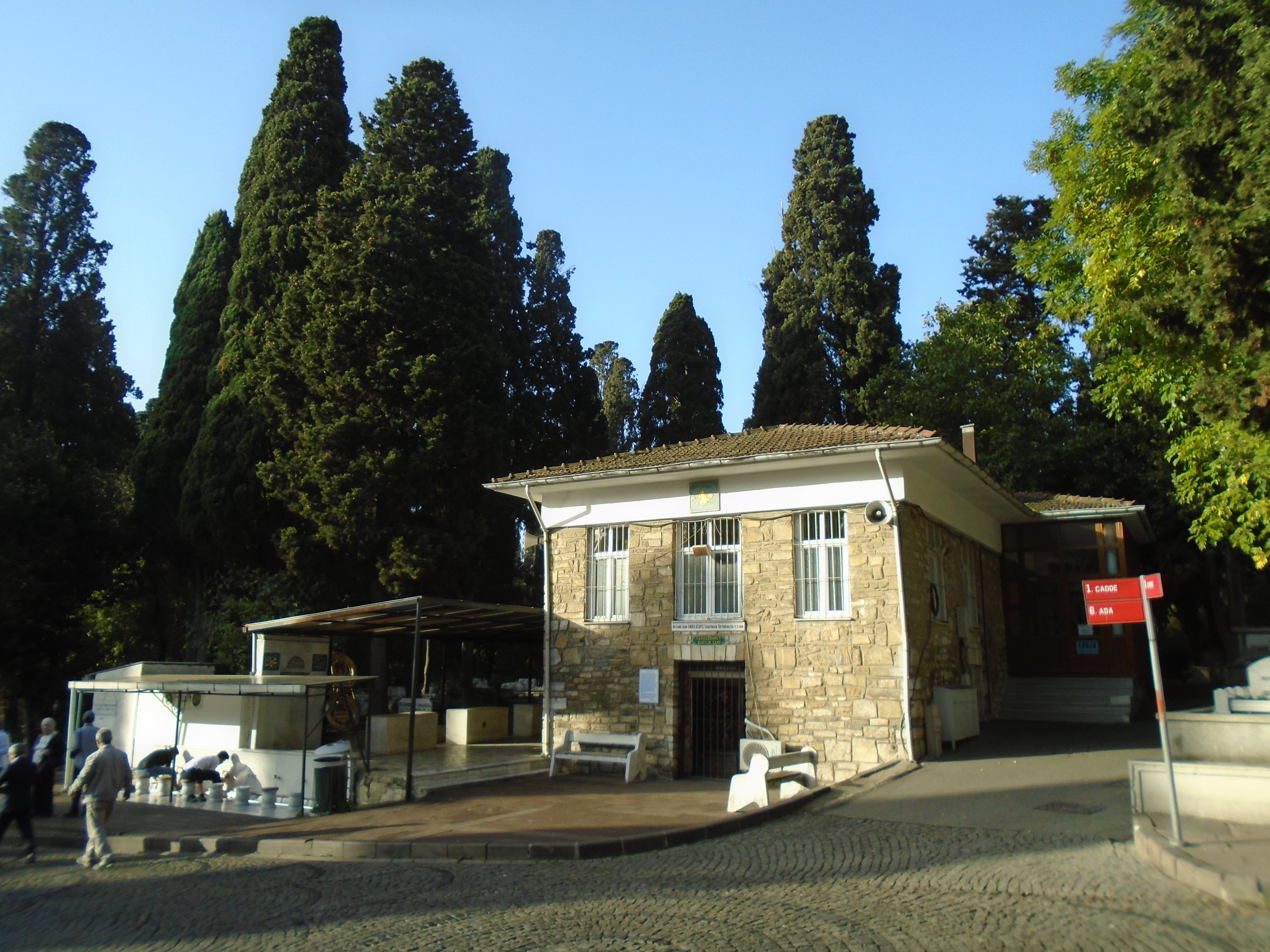
Entrance of Karacaahmet Cemetery in Istanbul, Turkey

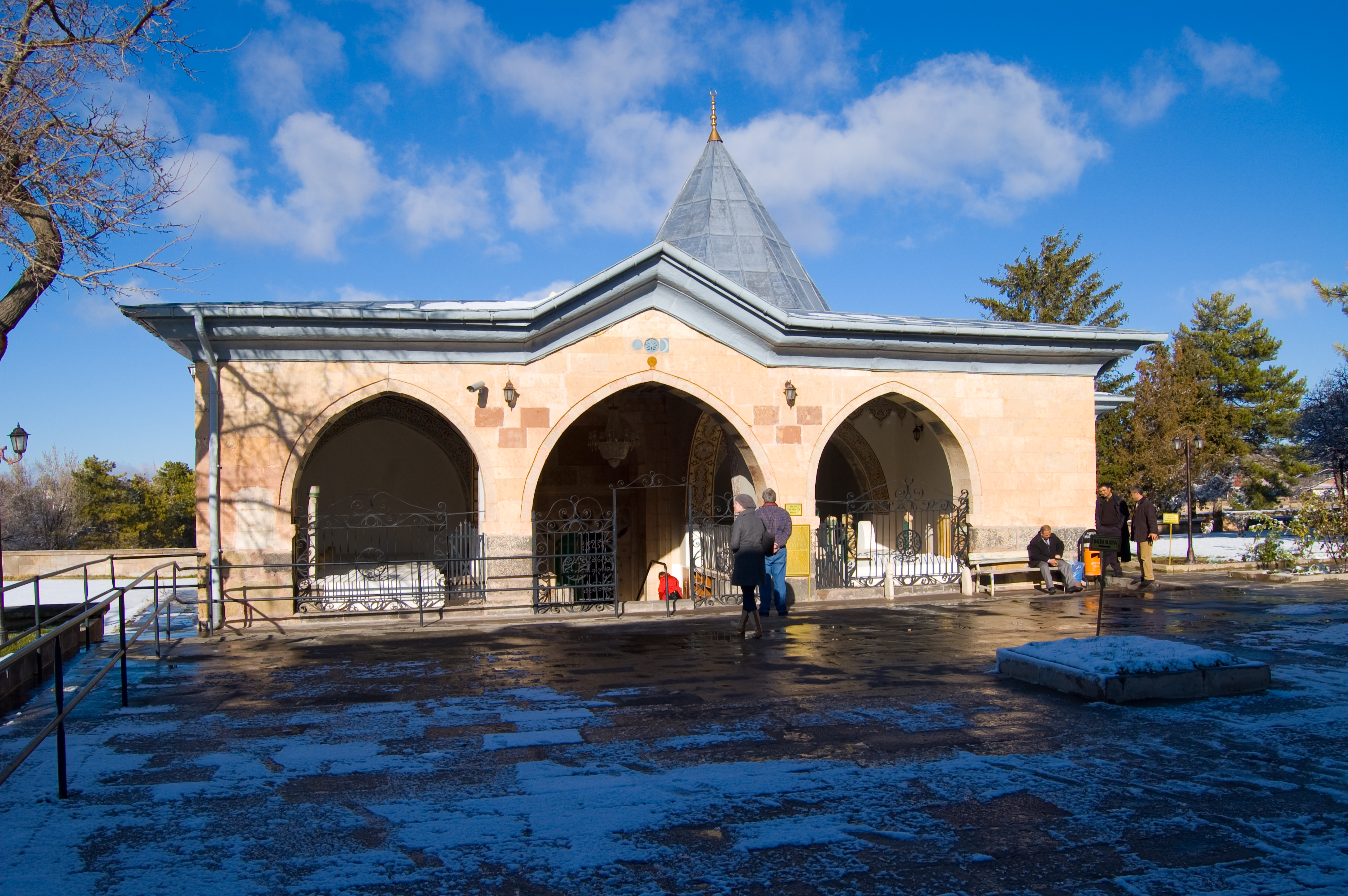
Haji Bektash Veli Complex in Hacıbektaş, Turkey

Performing ziyarat and du'a at the tombs of Alevi-Bektashi saints or pirs is quite common. Some of the most frequently visited sites are the shrines of Şahkulu and Karacaahmet (both in Istanbul), Abdal Musa (Antalya), Seyyid Battal Gazi Complex (Eskişehir), Hamza Baba (İzmir), Hasandede (Kırıkkale).

In contrast with the traditional secrecy of the Cem ceremony ritual, the events at these cultural centers and sites are open to the public. In the case of the Hacibektaş celebration, since 1990 the activities there have been taken over by Turkey's Ministry of Culture in the interest of promoting tourism and Turkish patriotism rather than Alevi spirituality. The annual celebrations held at Hacıbektaş (16 August) and Sivas (the Pir Sultan Abdal Kültür Etkinlikleri, 23–24 June).

Some Alevis make pilgrimages to mountains and other natural sites believed to be imbued with holiness.

==== Almsgiving ====
Alevis are expected to give zakat, but there is no set formula or prescribed amount for annual charitable donation as there is in other forms of Islam (2.5% of possessions above a certain minimum). Rather, they are expected to give the "excess" according to Qur'an 2:219. A common method of Alevi almsgiving is through donating food (especially sacrificial animals) to be shared with worshippers and guests. Alevis also donate money to be used to help the poor, to support the religious, educational and cultural activities of Alevi centers and organizations (dargahs, awqaf, and meetings), and to provide scholarships for students.

==== Infant initiation ====
There is an initiation called kırklama, which takes place 40-days after the birth. Unlike, many other Islamic sects, in Alevism khitan or circumcision is considered a tradition, but it is not strictly mandatory. Today, there are is an increasing number of modern and secular Alevis who choose to not circumcise their male children for a variety of different reasons. Many other branches of Islam view circumcision as strictly mandatory outside of rare circumstances. The Dede is responsible for leading the spiritual kinship practice of kirvelik which can include but does not require circumcision.

== History ==
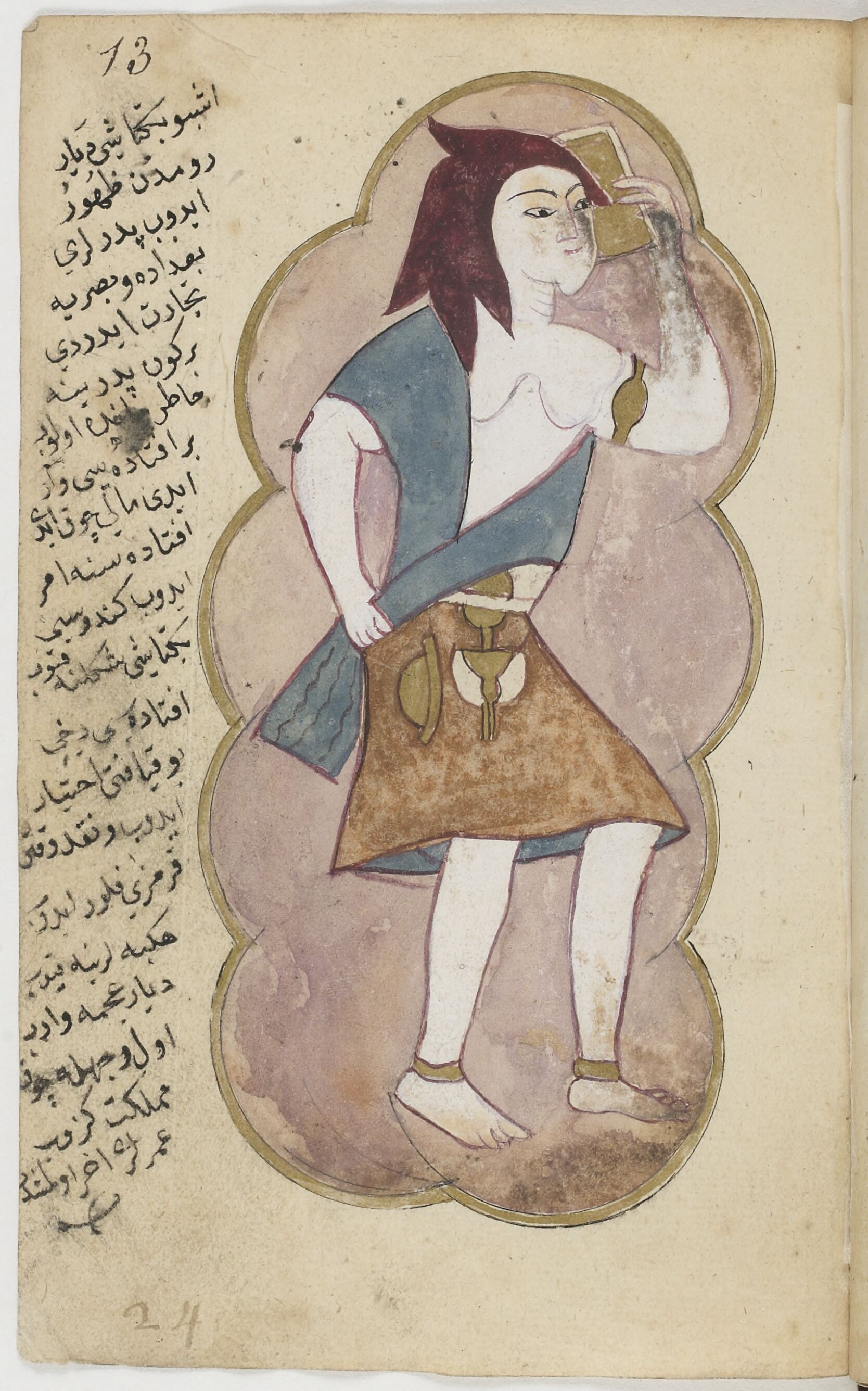
Ottoman miniature of Haji Bektash Veli

=== Seljuk period ===
During the great Turkish expansion from Central Asia into Iran and Anatolia in the Seljuk period (11–12th centuries), Turkmen tribes accepted a Sufi and pro-Alid form of Islam that co-existed with some of their pre-Islamic customs. Their conversion to Islam in this period was mainly achieved through the efforts not of textual scholars (ulama) expounding the finer points of tafsir and sharia, but by charismatic dervishes, a belief whose cult of Muslim saint worship, mystical divination and millenarianism spoke more directly to the steppe mindset. These tribes dominated Anatolia for centuries with their religious warriors (ghazi) spearheading the drive against Byzantines and Crusades.

=== Ottoman period ===
As in Khorasan and West Asia before, the Turkmens who spearheaded the Ottomans' drive into the Balkans and West Asia were more inspired by a vaguely Shiite folk Islam than by formal religion. Many times, Ottoman campaigns were accompanied or guided by Bektaşi dervishes as they were the military chaplains, spiritual heirs of the 13th century Sufi saint Haji Bektash Veli, himself a native of Khorasan. After the conquest of Constantinople in 1453, the Ottoman state became increasingly determined to assert its fiscal but also its juridical and political control over the farthest reaches of the Empire.

The resulting Qizilbash revolts, a series of millenarian anti-state uprisings by the non-Sunni Turkmen population of Anatolia that culminated in the establishment of a militantly Shiite rival state in neighbouring Iran. The Ottoman Empire later proclaimed themselves its defenders against the Safavid Shia state and related sects. This created a gap between the Sunni Ottoman ruling elite and the Alevi Anatolian population. Anatolia became a battlefield between Safavids and Ottomans, each determined to include it in their empire.

During the same era, orders that the Alevis followed were positioned differently. The Bektashiyya became the official army order whilst other orders like the Qalandariyya, Saʿdiyya and Safaviyya were seen as public adversaries.

=== Republic of Turkey ===
According to Eren Sarı, Alevi saw Kemal Atatürk as a Mahdi "savior sent to save them from the Sunni Ottoman yoke". However, pogroms against Alevi did not cease after the establishment of the Turkish Republic. In attacks against leftists in the 1970s, ultranationalists and reactionaries killed many Alevis. Malatya in 1978, Maraş in 1979, and Çorum in 1980 witnessed the murder of hundreds of Alevis, the torching of hundreds of homes, and lootings. Alevis have been victims of pogroms during both Ottoman times and under the Turkish republic up until the 1993 Sivas massacre.

The workshops process launched during the second term of the Justice and Development Party government, known as the "Alevi Opening", ended in disappointment among Alevi organizations, who found their demands treated as a question of the authenticity of Alevi tradition rather than of equal citizenship rights. Migration to Turkey's cities sharpened the question: as cem ceremonies became difficult to hold in private households, the allocation of land for new cemevis and the payment of their utilities emerged as significant problems and sources of contention.

In 2022, the Turkish state has officially recognized Alevism as a 'cultural group'. As of 2025, Alevism is recognized by the governments of the main Turkish diaspora destinations throughout the world.

The historical emergence of the Alevī Ṭarīqah

== Organization ==
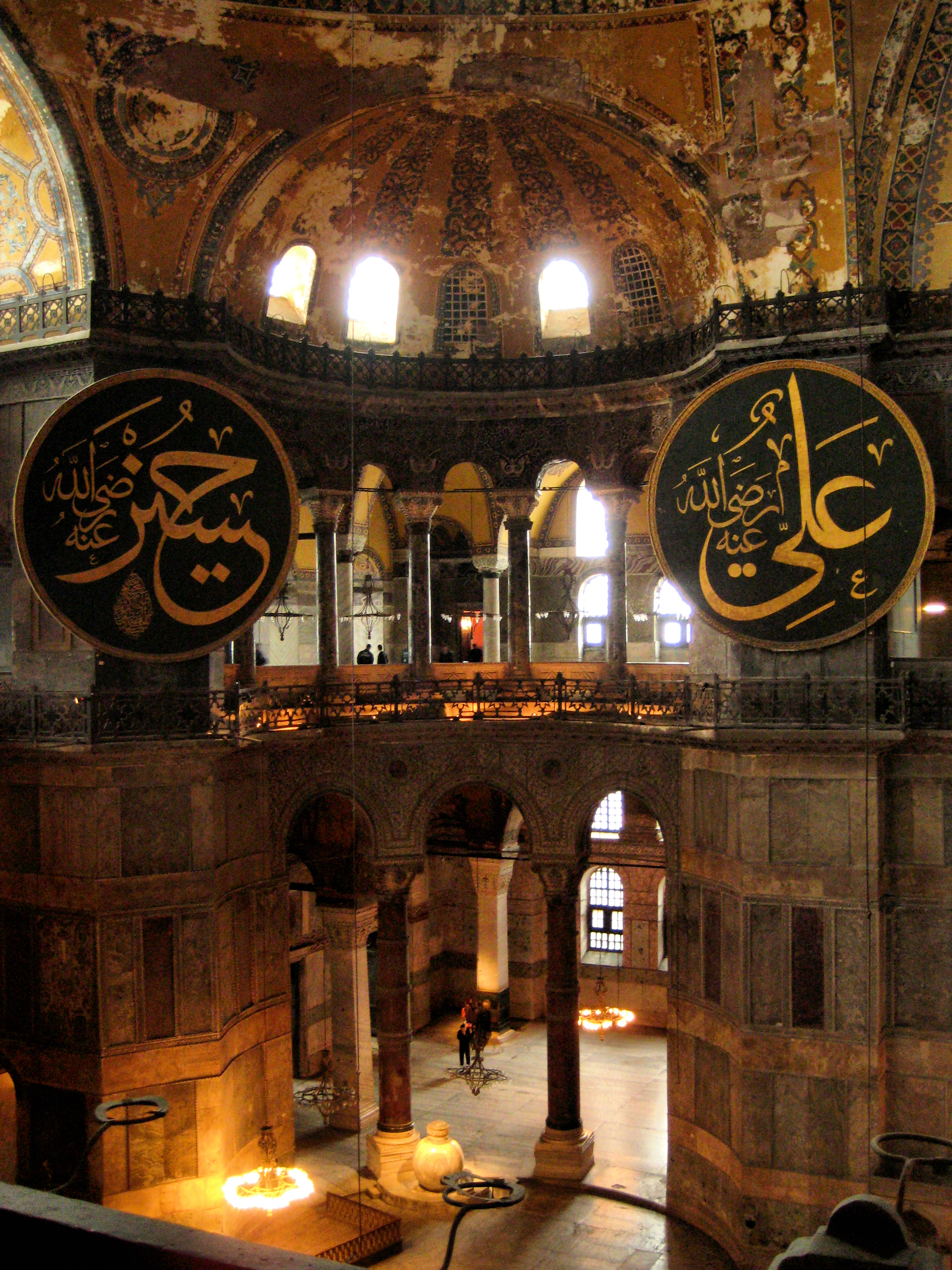
Ali (right) and Husayn ibn Ali (left) medallions in Hagia Sophia

In contrast to the Bektashi order – tariqa, which like other Sufi orders is based on a silsila "initiatory chain or lineage" of teachers and their students, Alevi leaders succeed to their role on the basis of family descent. Perhaps ten percent of Alevis belong to a religious elite called ocak "hearth", indicating descent from Ali and/or various other saints and heroes. Ocak members are called ocakzades or "sons of the hearth". This system apparently originated in the Safavid state.

Alevi leaders are variously called murshid, pir, rehber or dede. Groups that conceive of these as ranks of a hierarchy (as in the Bektashi Order) disagree as to the order. The last of these, dede "grandfather", is the term preferred by the scholarly literature. Ocakzades may attain to the position of dede on the basis of selection (by a father from among several sons), character, and learning. In contrast to Alevi rhetoric on the equality of the sexes, it is generally assumed that only males may fill such leadership roles.

In the wake of 20th century urbanization (which removed young laborers from the villages) and socialist influence (which looked upon the dedes with suspicion), the old hierarchy has largely broken down. Many dedes now receive salaries from Alevi cultural centers, which arguably subordinates their role. Such centers no longer feature community business or deliberation, such as the old ritual of reconciliation, but emphasize musical and dance performance to the exclusion of these. Dedes are now approached on a voluntary basis, and their role has become more circumscribed – limited to religious rituals, research, and giving advice.

According to John Shindeldecker "Alevis are proud to point out that they are monogamous, Alevi women are encouraged to get the best education they can, and Alevi women are free to go into any occupation they choose."

=== Relationship with other groups ===
Alevis are usually classified as a sect of Shia Islam, and Ayatollah Ruhollah Khomeini decreed Alevis to be part of the Shia fold in the 1970s. However, Alevi philosophies, customs, and rituals are appreciably different from those of mainstream, orthodox Usulis.

The relationship between Alevis and Sunnis is one of mutual suspicion and prejudice dating back to the Ottoman period. Hundreds of Alevis were murdered in sectarian violence in the years that preceded the 1980 coup, and as late as the 1990s dozens were killed with impunity. While pogroms have not occurred since then, Erdogan has declared "a cemevi is not a place of worship, it is a center for cultural activities. Muslims should only have one place of worship."

There are claims that they have been subject to intolerant Sunni "nationalism" that has been unwilling to recognize Alevi "uniqueness".

== Demographics ==
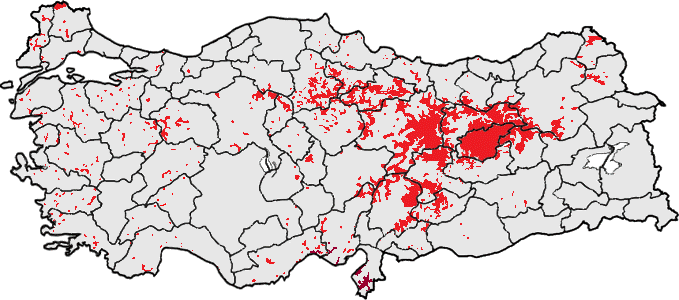
Distribution of Alevi population in Turkey. Red = Anatolian Alevis (Turks and Kurds). Dark red = Alawites (Arabs) in Southern Turkey.

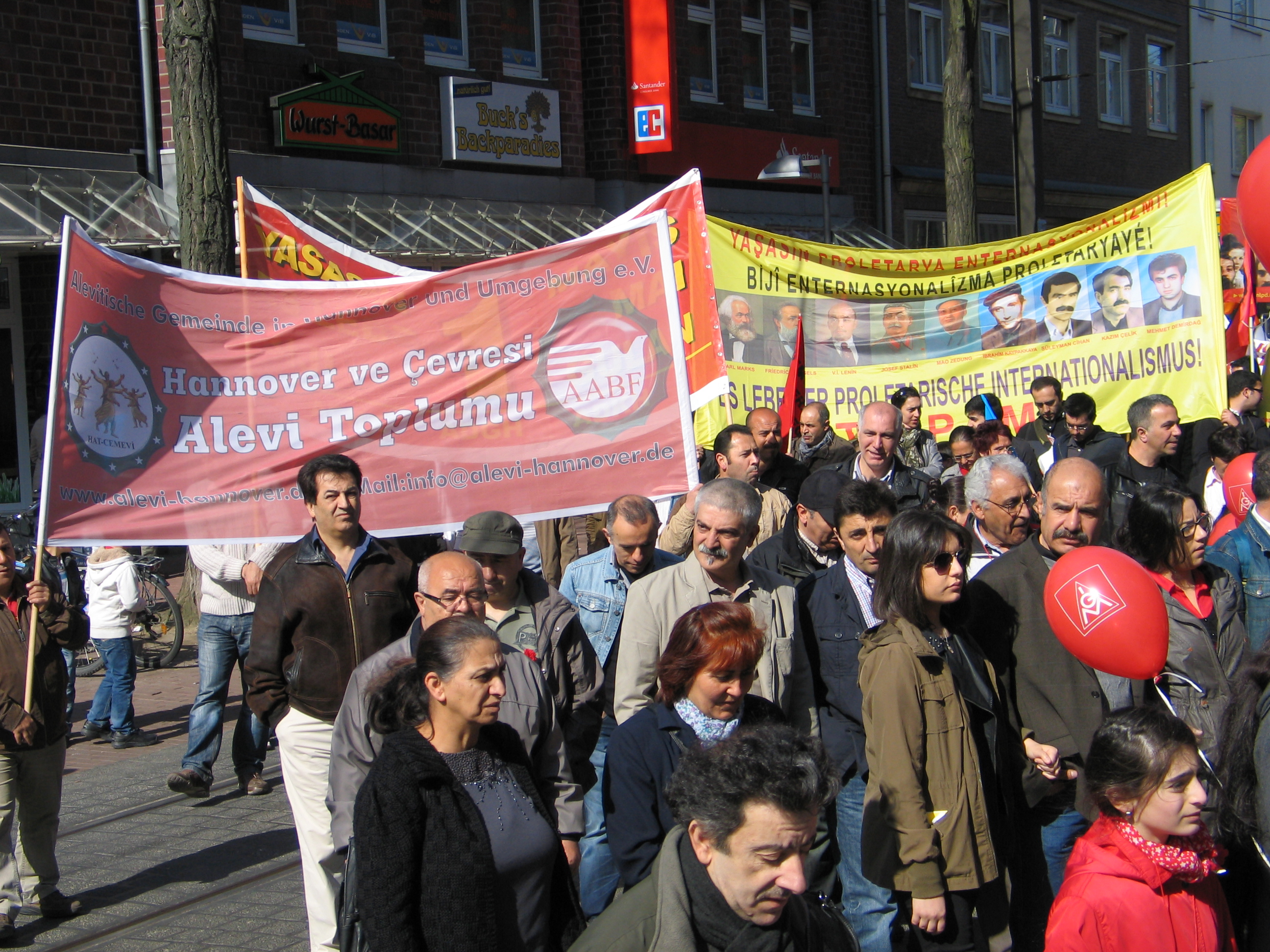
Alevis in a demonstration in Hannover

Most Alevi live in Turkey, where they are a minority and Sunni Muslims the majority. The size of the Alevi population is likewise disputed, but most estimates place them somewhere between 4% and 15%. Scattered minorities live in the Balkans, the Caucasus, Cyprus, Greece, Iran and the diaspora such as Germany and France. In the 2021 United Kingdom census, Alevism was discovered to be the eighth largest religion in England and Wales, after Christianity, Islam, Hinduism, Sikhism, Buddhism, Judaism and Paganism.

Different estimations exist on the ethnic composition of the Alevi population. Ethnic Turks are thought to be the largest ethnic group among Alevis, while Dressler stated in 2008 that about a third of the Alevi population is Kurdish, Hamza Aksüt argued that the majority is Kurdish when all groups he considers as Alevis, such as the Yarsanis, are counted.

=== Population estimates ===
The Alevi population has been estimated as follows:

- Approximately 20 million according to Daily Sabah, a newspaper close to the government in 2021.
- 12,521,000 according to Sabahat Akkiraz, an MP from CHP.
- "approx. 15 million..." – Krisztina Kehl-Bodrogi.
- 4% of total population of Turkey – KONDA Research (2021).
- In Turkey, 15% of Turkey's population (approx. 10.6 million) – Shankland (2006).
- 20 to 25 million according to Minority Rights Group.
- There is a native 3,000 Alevi community in Western Thrace, Greece.
- The predominant religion of the Äynu people of western China is Alevism. There are estimated to be around 30–50 thousand Äynu, mostly located on the fringe of the Taklamakan Desert.
- 25,672 Alevi live in England and Wales.
- 600,000 to 700,000 Alevi live in Germany.
- 100,000 to 200,000 Alevi live in France.

=== Social groups ===
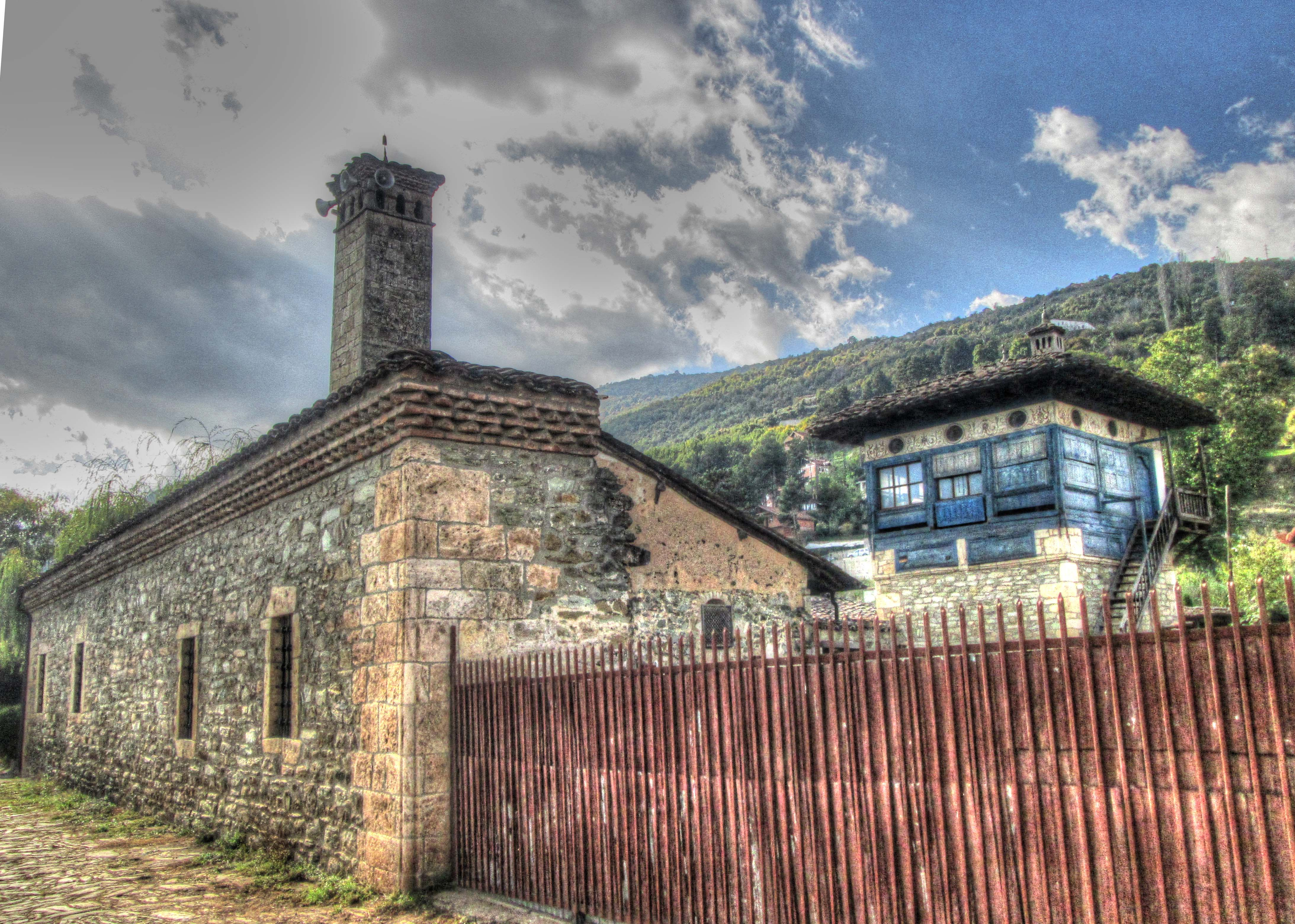
Arabati Baba Teḱe in Tetovo, North Macedonia

There is an unofficial division between Alevis in terms of locative origins. The 'Village Alevis' (Kizilbash or Köy Aleviliği) are traditionally predominantly rural and acquire identity through the family. According to the AABF (German Federation of Alevi Associations), in Kizilbash Alevism, it is sufficient for a person to be considered an Alevi if their mother or father are Alevi. The other partition, the 'City Bektashis' (Şehir Bektaşilği) however, are predominantly urban, and formally claim that membership is open to any Muslim. The groups are separately organized but subscribe to "virtually the same system of beliefs".

A research of the Swedish Research Institute has distinguished four main groups among contemporary Alevis in Turkey.

The first group, who form a majority of the Alevi population, regard themselves as true Muslims and are prepared to cooperate with the secular state. It adheres to the way of Jafar as-Sadiq, the Sixth Imam of Shia Islam. This group's concept of God is the same as Orthodox Islam, and like their Shia counterparts they reject the first three chosen Caliphs, whom Sunni accept as legitimate, and accept only Ali as the actual and true Caliph.

The second group, which has the second most following among Alevis, are said to be under the active influence of the official Shia and to be confirmed adherents of the Twelver branch of Shia Islam and they reject the teachings of Bektashism. They follow the Ja'fari jurisprudence and oppose secular state power.

Traditional Alevi Turcoman clothing
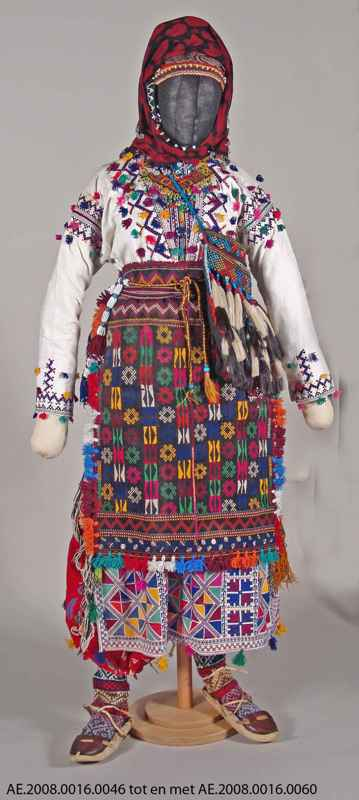
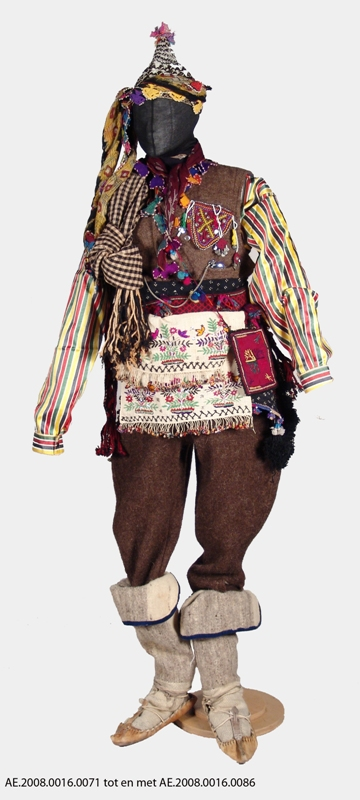

The third group, a minority belief held by the Alevis, is mainly represented by people who belong to the political left and presumed the Aleviness as an outlook on life rather than a religious conviction by renouncing the ties of Alevism with Twelver Shia Islam. The followers of this congregation, who later turned out to support Erdoğan Çınar, hold ritual unions of a religious character and have established cultural associations named after Pir Sultan Abdal as well. According to their philosophy, the human being should enjoy a central role reminiscent of the doctrine of Khurramites, and as illustrated by Hurufi phrase of God is Man quoted above in the context of the Trinity.

The fourth who adopted some aspirations of Christian mysticism, is more directed towards heterodox mysticism and stands closer to the Bektashi order. According to the philosophy developed by this congregation, Christian mystic St Francis of Assisi and Hindu Mahatma Gandhi are better believers of God than many Muslims.

== See also ==
- Anti-Alevism
- Kureyshan
- Duzgin Bawo
- Kurdish Alevism
- Religious humanism
- Shi'a view of Ali
- Ishikism
- Tahtacı
- Bektashism
- Alevi history

== Bibliography ==
General introductions

- Dressler, Markus (2008). "Alevīs". In Fleet, Kate; Krämer, Gudrun; Matringe, Denis; Nawas, John; Rowson, Everett (eds.). Encyclopaedia of Islam (3rd ed.). Brill Online. ISSN 1873-9830.
- Engin, Ismail & Franz, Erhard (2000). Aleviler / Alewiten. Cilt 1 Band: Kimlik ve Tarih / Identität und Geschichte. Hamburg: Deutsches Orient Institut (Mitteilungen Band 59/2000). ISBN 3-89173-059-4
- Engin, Ismail & Franz, Erhard (2001). Aleviler / Alewiten. Cilt 2 Band: İnanç ve Gelenekler / Glaube und Traditionen. Hamburg: Deutsches Orient Institut (Mitteilungen Band 60/2001). ISBN 3-89173-061-6
- Engin, Ismail & Franz, Erhard (2001). Aleviler / Alewiten. Cilt 3 Band: Siyaset ve Örgütler / Politik und Organisationen. Hamburg: Deutsches Orient Institut (Mitteilungen Band 61/2001). ISBN 3-89173-062-4
- Kehl-Bodrogi, Krisztina (1992). Die Kizilbas/Aleviten. Untersuchungen über eine esoterische Glaubensgemeinschaft in Anatolien. Die Welt des Islams, (New Series), Vol. 32, No. 1.
- Kitsikis, Dimitri (1999). Multiculturalism in the Ottoman Empire : The Alevi Religious and Cultural Community, in P. Savard & B. Vigezzi eds. Multiculturalism and the History of International Relations Milano: Edizioni Unicopli.
- Kjeilen, Tore (undated). "Alevism Archived 4 June 2012 at the Wayback Machine," in the (online) Encyclopedia of the Orient.
- Shankland, David (2003). The Alevis in Turkey: The Emergence of a Secular Islamic Tradition. Curzon Press.
- Shindeldecker, John (1996). Turkish Alevis Today. Istanbul: Sahkulu.
- White, Paul J., & Joost Jongerden (eds.) (2003). Turkey’s Alevi Enigma: A Comprehensive Overview. Leiden: Brill.
- Yaman, Ali & Aykan Erdemir (2006). Alevism-Bektashism: A Brief Introduction, London: England Alevi Cultural Centre & Cem Evi. ISBN 975-98065-3-3
- Zeidan, David (1999) "The Alevi of Anatolia." Middle East Review of International Affairs 3/4.

Kurdish Alevis

- Bumke, Peter (1979). "Kizilbaş-Kurden in Dersim (Tunceli, Türkei). Marginalität und Häresie." Anthropos 74, 530–548.
- Gezik, Erdal (2000), Etnik Politik Dinsel Sorunlar Baglaminda Alevi Kurtler, Ankara.
- Van Bruinessen, Martin (1997). "Aslını inkar eden haramzadedir! The Debate on the Kurdish Ethnic Identity of the Kurdish Alevis." In K. Kehl-Bodrogi, B. Kellner-Heinkele, & A. Otter-Beaujean (eds), Syncretistic Religious Communities in the Near East (Leiden: Brill).
- Van Bruinessen, Martin (1996). Kurds, Turks, and the Alevi revival in Turkey. Middle East Report, No. 200, pp. 7–10. (NB: The online version is expanded from its original publication.)
- White, Paul J. (2003), "The Debate on the Identity of ‘Alevi Kurds’." In: Paul J. White/Joost Jongerden (eds.) Turkey’s Alevi Enigma: A Comprehensive Overview. Leiden: Brill, pp. 17–32.

Alevi / Bektashi history

- Birge, John Kingsley (1937). The Bektashi order of dervishes Archived 12 February 2012 at the Wayback Machine, London and Hartford.
- Brown, John P. (1868), The Dervishes; or, Oriental Spiritualism.
- Küçük, Hülya (2002) The Roles of the Bektashis in Turkey’s National Struggle. Leiden: Brill.
- Mélikoff, Irène (1998). Hadji Bektach: Un mythe et ses avatars. Genèse et évolution du soufisme populaire en Turquie. Leiden: Islamic History and Civilization, Studies and Texts, volume 20, ISBN 90-04-10954-4.
- Shankland, David (1994). "Social Change and Culture: Responses to Modernization in an Alevi Village in Anatolia."In C.N. Hann, ed., When History Accelerates: Essays on Rapid Social Change, Complexity, and Creativity. London: Athlone Press.
- Yaman, Ali (undated). "Kizilbash Alevi Dedes." (Based on his MA thesis for Istanbul University.)

Ghulat sects in general

- Halm, H. (1982). Die Islamische gnosis: Die extreme Schia und die Alawiten. Zürich.
- Krisztina Kehl-Bodrogi, Krisztina, & Barbara Kellner-Heinkele, Anke Otter-Beaujean, eds. (1997) Syncretistic Religious Communities in the Near East. Leiden: Brill, pp. 11–18.
- Moosa, Matti (1988). Extremist Shiites: The Ghulat Sects, Syracuse University Press.
- Van Bruinessen, Martin (2005). "Religious practices in the Turco-Iranian world: continuity and change." French translation published as: "Les pratiques religieuses dans le monde turco-iranien: changements et continuités", Cahiers d'Études sur la Méditerranée Orientale et le Monde Turco-Iranien, no. 39–40, 101–121.

Alevi Identity

- Erdemir, Aykan (2005). "Tradition and Modernity: Alevis' Ambiguous Terms and Turkey's Ambivalent Subjects", Middle Eastern Studies, 2005, vol.41, no.6, pp. 937–951.
- Greve, Martin and Ulas Özdemir and Raoul Motika, eds. 2020. Aesthetic and Performative Dimensions of Alevi Cultural Heritage. Ergon Verlag. 215 pages. ISBN 978-3956506406
- Koçan, Gürcan/Öncü, Ahmet (2004) "Citizen Alevi in Turkey: Beyond Confirmation and Denial." Journal of Historical Sociology, 17/4, pp. 464–489.
- Olsson, Tord & Elizabeth Özdalga/Catharina Raudvere, eds. (1998). Alevi Identity: Cultural, Religious and Social Perspectives. Istanbul: Swedish Research Institute.
- Stokes, Martin (1996). "Ritual, Identity and the State: An Alevi (Shi’a) Cem Ceremony."In Kirsten E. Schulze et al. (eds.), Nationalism, Minorities and Diasporas: Identities and Rights in the Middle East,, pp. 194–196.
- Vorhoff, Karin (1995). Zwischen Glaube, Nation und neuer Gemeinschaft: Alevitische Identität in der Türkei der Gegenwart. Berlin.

Alevism in Europe

- Geaves, Ron (2003) "Religion and Ethnicity: Community Formation in the British Alevi Community." Koninklijke Brill NV 50, pp. 52– 70.
- Kosnick, Kira (2004) "‘Speaking in One’s Own Voice’: Representational Strategies of Alevi Turkish Migrants on Open-Access Television in Berlin." Journal of Ethnic and Migration Studies, 30/5, pp. 979–994.
- Massicard, Elise (2003) "Alevist Movements at Home and Abroad: Mobilization Spaces and Disjunction." New Perspective on Turkey, 28, pp. 163–188.
- Rigoni, Isabelle (2003) "Alevis in Europe: A Narrow Path towards Visibility." In: Paul J. White/Joost Jongerden (eds.) Turkey's Alevi Enigma: A Comprehensive Overview, Leiden: Brill, pp. 159–173.
- Sökefeld, Martin (2002) "Alevi Dedes in the German Diaspora: The Transformation of a Religious Institution." Zeitschrift für Ethnologie, 127, pp. 163–189.
- Sökefeld, Martin (2004) "Alevis in Germany and the Question of Integration" paper presented at the Conference on the Integration of Immigrants from Turkey in Austria, Germany and Holland, Boğaziçi University, Istanbul, February 27–28, 2004.
- Sökefeld, Martin & Suzanne Schwalgin (2000). "Institutions and their Agents in Diaspora: A Comparison of Armenians in Athens and Alevis in Germany." Paper presented at the sixth European Association of Social Anthropologist Conference, Krakau.
- Thomä-Venske, Hanns (1990). "The Religious Life of Muslim in Berlin." In: Thomas Gerholm/Yngve Georg Lithman (eds.) The New Islamic Presence in Western Europe, New York: Mansell, pp. 78–87.
- Wilpert, Czarina (1990) "Religion and Ethnicity: Orientations, Perceptions and Strategies among Turkish Alevi and Sunni Migrants in Berlin." In: Thomas Gerholm/Yngve Georg Lithman (eds.) The New Islamic Presence in Western Europe. New York: Mansell, pp. 88–106.
- Zirh, Besim Can (2008) "Euro-Alevis: From Gastarbeiter to Transnational Community." In: Anghel, Gerharz, Rescher and Salzbrunn (eds.) The Making of World Society: Perspectives from Transnational Research. Transcript; 103–130.

Bibliographies

- Vorhoff, Karin. (1998), "Academic and Journalistic Publications on the Alevi and Bektashi of Turkey." In: Tord Olsson/Elizabeth Özdalga/Catharina Raudvere (eds.) Alevi Identity: Cultural, Religious and Social Perspectives, Istanbul: Swedish Research Institute, pp. 23–50.
- van Bruinessen, Martin (2015), "Dersim and Dalahu: Some Reflections on Kurdish Alevism and the Ahl-i Haqq religion", Islamic Alternatives: Non-Mainstream Religion in Persianate Societies, ISBN 9783447107792

Turkish-language works

- Ata, Kelime. (2007), Alevilerin İlk Siyasal Denemesi: (Türkiye Birlik Partisi) (1966–1980). Ankara: Kelime Yayınevi.
- Aydın, Ayhan. (2008), Abidin Özgünay: Yazar Yayıncı ve Cem Dergisi Kurucusu. İstanbul: Niyaz Yayınları.
- Balkız, Ali. (1999), Sivas’tan Sydney’e Pir Sultan. Ankara: İtalik.
- Balkız, Ali. (2002), Pir Sultan’da Birlik Mücadelesi (Hızır Paşalar’a Yanıt). Ankara: İtalik.
- Bilgöl, Hıdır Ali. (1996), Aleviler ve Canlı Fotoğraflar, Alev Yayınları.
- Coşkun, Zeki (1995) Aleviler, Sünniler ve ... Öteki Sivas, Istanbul: İletişim Yayınları.
- Dumont, Paul. (1997), "Günümüz Türkiye’sinde Aleviliğin Önemi" içinde Aynayı Yüzüme Ali Göründü Gözüme: Yabancı Araştırmacıların Gözüyle Alevilik, editör: İlhan Cem Erseven. İsntabul: Ant, 141–161.
- Engin, Havva ve Engin, Ismail (2004). Alevilik. Istanbul: Kitap Yayınevi.
- Gül, Zeynel. (1995), Yol muyuz Yolcu muyuz? İstanbul: Can Yayınları.
- Gül, Zeynel. (1999), Dernekten Partiye: Avrupa Alevi Örgütlenmesi. Ankara: İtalik.
- Güler, Sabır. (2008), Aleviliğin Siyasal Örgütlenmesi: Modernleşme, Çözülme ve Türkiye Birlik Partisi. Ankara: Dipnot.
- İrat, Ali Murat. (2008), Devletin Bektaşi Hırkası / Devlet, Aleviler ve Ötekiler. İstanbul: Chiviyazıları.
- Kaleli, Lütfü. (2000), "1964–1997 Yılları Arasında Alevi Örgütleri" içinde Aleviler/Alewiten: Kimlik ve Tarih/ Indentität und Geschichte, editörler: İsmail Engin ve Erhard Franz. Hamburg: Deutsches Orient-Institut, 223–241.
- Kaleli, Lütfü. (2000), Alevi Kimliği ve Alevi Örgütlenmeri. İstanbul: Can Yayınları.
- Kaplan, İsmail. (2000), "Avrupa’daki Alevi Örgütlenmesine Bakış" içinde Aleviler/Alewiten: Kimlik ve Tarih/ Indentität und Geschichte, editörler: İsmail Engin ve Erhard Franz. Hamburg: Deutsches Orient-Institut, 241–260.
- Kaplan, İsmail. (2009), Alevice: İnancımız ve Direncimiz. Köln: AABF Yayınları.
- Kocadağ, Burhan. (1996), Alevi Bektaşi Tarihi. İstanbul: Can Yayınları.
- Massicard, Elise. (2007), Alevi Hareketinin Siyasallaşması. İstanbul: İletişim.
- Melikoff, Irene. (1993), Uyur İdik Uyardılar. İstanbul: Cem Yayınevi.
- Okan, Murat. (2004), Türkiye’de Alevilik / Antropolojik Bir Yaklaşım. Ankara: İmge.
- Özerol, Süleyman. (2009), Hasan Nedim Şahhüseyinoğlu. Ankara: Ürün.
- Şahhüseyinoğlu, H. Nedim. (2001), Hızır Paşalar: Bir İhracın Perde Arkası. Ankara: İtalik.
- Şahhüseyinoğlu, Nedim. (1997), Pir Sultan Kültür Derneği’nin Demokrasi Laiklik ve Özgürlük Mücadelesi. Ankara: PSAKD Yayınları.
- Şahhüseyinoğlu, Nedim. (2001), Alevi Örgütlerinin Tarihsel Süreci. Ankara: İtalik.
- Salman, Meral. 2006, Müze Duvarlarına Sığmayan Dergah: Alevi – Bektaşi Kimliğinin Kuruluş Sürecinde Hacı Bektaş Veli Anma Görenleri. Ankara: Kalan.
- Saraç, Necdet. (2010), Alevilerin Siyasal Tarihi. İstanbul: Cem.
- Şener, Cemal ve Miyase İlknur. (1995), Şeriat ve Alevilik: Kırklar Meclisi’nden Günümüze Alevi Örgütlenmesi. İstanbul: Ant.
- Tosun, Halis. (2002), Alevi Kimliğiyle Yaşamak. İstanbul: Can Yayınları.
- Vergin, Nur (2000, [1981]), Din, Toplum ve Siyasal Sistem, İstanbul: Bağlam.
- Yaman, Ali (2000) "Anadolu Aleviliği’nde Ocak Sistemi Ve Dedelik Kurumu." Alevi Bektaşi.
- Zırh, Besim Can. (2005), "Avro-Aleviler: Ziyaretçi İşçilikten Ulus-aşırı Topluluğa" Kırkbudak 2: 31–58.
- Zırh, Besim Can. (2006), "Avrupa Alevi Konfederasyonu Turgut Öker ile Görüşme" Kırkbudak 2: 51–71.
