= Otman Baba =

Dervish

Otman Baba (c. 1378 – 8 Receb 1478) was a 15th-century dervish who traveled throughout the Ottoman Empire, acquiring a following among Muslims in Bulgaria after 1445 that has developed into his veneration as a saint. After Otman Baba's death, a pilgrimage complex grew around his grave in the present-day Bulgarian village of Teketo, which was made a museum during communism. The hagiography of Otman Baba, written by his disciple Küçük Abdal and regarded by his followers as a canonical text, maintains that Otman Baba performed miracles that proved his superiority to other dervishes and Ottoman authorities, particularly Sultan Mehmed II. Straying from orthodox Islamic tenets, Otman Baba asserted his unity with God and his mastery of divine secrets—as the embodiment of monotheistic religious figures such as Muhammad, Jesus, and Moses.

== Sources ==
Written five-and-a-half years after his death, the vilâyetname (hagiography) of Otman Baba provides the most thorough if biased depiction of the mystic's life. It differs from similar hagiographic accounts, as it more prominently presents historical information during Otman Baba's lifetime. Written by a direct disciple of Otman Baba named Küçük Abdal (also Köğçek/Köçek Abdal), the original vilâyetname was entitled Haza Kitab-i Risale-i Vilâyet-name-i Sultan Baba, kaddes' Allahu sırruh ül-aziz (This book is a book with description of the miracles of Sultan Baba, let Allah consecrate his tomb). Known manuscripts of the vilâyetname include a 260-page one transcribed by Şeyh Ömer (Umar) bin Dervish Ahmed in 1758 and one from the Bulgarian village of Gorna Krepost taken to Turkey with the Alevi emigrants. A modern Turkish retelling based on various sources also exists.

Other sources include the vilâyetname of Otman Baba's successor Demir Baba, which refers to Otman Baba as the "pole of poles" and "Pole of the Universe and Time", symbols of his high spiritual rank; the vilâyetname also avouches Otman Baba's ability to instantly appear and disappear. Another source is the work of Evliya Çelebi, which cites Otman Baba as a leader of ascetic dervishes and a gazi (religious warrior) who helped conquer the Ottoman Empire's European province of Rumelia.

== Life ==
According to the vilâyetname, Otman Baba was born in 1378 or 1379. He belonged to the Amuca tribe, and spoke an Azeri-accented Oghuz language with few Persian and Arabic influences, like the Muslims in northeastern Bulgaria. Küçük Abdal characterized Otman Baba spiritually as a saint and prophet and physically as imposing, strong, and brave.

While those outside his inner circle knew him as Otman Baba, other dervishes and the aristocratic sayyids called him Şah-i Kerbelâ—a reference to the prophet Muhammad's grandson Husayn, who died in the Battle of Karbala. A vilâyetname account attributes the mystic's common name "Otman Baba" to Ottoman ruler Mehmed II. When the sultan disguised himself as a commoner and visited the Eski Saray tekke (a gathering place for Muslims) in Constantinople, only Otman Baba recognized him. Convinced of the dervish's sainthood, Mehmed addressed him as "my beloved father, Otman"—"father" translating in Turkish as "baba".

=== Relationship with Ottoman authorities ===
Dervish leaders faced accusations of turning commoners against the Ottoman government's policies. Otman Baba's proselytizing in the Eastern Balkans and Anatolia coincides with the settlements of the nomadic Yürüks, who were hostile toward the Ottoman bureaucracy that forcibly recruited them as soldiers. Nevertheless, the vilâyetname asserts that Mehmed II recognized Otman Baba as a true saint and the true Ottoman leader, and it presents supportive interactions between Otman Baba and Mehmed II. In one account, Otman Baba appears in Mehmed's dream to predict his reign as sultan while the then-prince was in Manisa.

Their relationship, however, was not always cordial, as scholars Stavrides and Gramatikova mention that Otman Baba frightened Mehmed II with his mastery over the elements, summoning a storm that flooded Constantinople after Mehmed ordered the dervish to enter a monastery. Although Küçük Abdal credits Mehmed II's military victories to Otman Baba's sainthood, the mystic predicted the sultan's defeat in the 1456 Serbia campaign. Otman Baba's relationships with other Ottoman authorities varied. Those opposed to Otman Baba included the orthodox vizier Mahmud Paşa, who did not recognize the mystic's sainthood, and an akıncı (military auxiliary), who apprehended Otman Baba and whose wife forced the mystic to pasture ducks for a month. A sancakbey (district governor) named Mihaloğlu Ali Bey, however, donated to Otman Baba's tomb after the mystic had supported his military victories.

=== Wanderings ===
During his life, Otman Baba wandered throughout the Ottoman Empire, mainly in Rumelia, spending the most time in Bulgarian lands and Aegean Thrace. After 30 September 1429 or 19 September 1430, Otman Baba began proselytizing in Rumelia. He performed his first miracle in the Balkans in Babaeski, extinguishing a candlestick's flame that had been lit by the mystic Sarı Saltık Baba, proving his sainthood to ordinary followers of Sufism. As Gramatikova notes, Otman Baba challenged rival Alevi and Bektashi spiritual guides and won, proving his spiritual superiority.

Gramatikova dates Otman Baba's earliest presence in Bulgarian lands from 1445 to 1451, where he propagated and interpreted Islamic mysticism. Beginning his propagandizing alone, Otman Baba recruited dervish followers—called Abdals—from the Balkan Muslim population. When Otman Baba defeated a lamia in the Ludogorie region, he achieved his first miracle in Bulgarian lands, an act that Gramatikova characterizes as "one of the greatest miracles of the Muslim saints". Otman Baba travelled through the eastern foothills of Stara Planina, following Sufi doctrine by surviving on leaves and wild fruit as he meditated on God. Gramatikova proposes that the local woodcutters who saw him and hosted him in their village were Sufi Muslims and nomads who had migrated from Turkey during the mid-15th century. In the Kazanlak area, Otman Baba garnered a following of Sufi craftsmen and built a bridge with hunters, whom Gramatikova associates with nomadic Yürüks and Turcomans. Near Plovdiv, a local saint named Hasan Baba called Otman Baba the dual embodiment of Muhammed and Ali after spotting him in the Maritsa River.

By 1451, Otman Baba had proselytized throughout Anatolia—particularly in Ottoman-ruled Western Asia Minor—working miracles and proving his sainthood. The vilâyetname offers conflicting accounts of Otman Baba's activities between 1451 and 1453. One holds that Otman Baba propagandized in Azeri lands, departing with the claim: "I shall saddle a cloud, shall turn the lightning into a whip and shall go back to Rum." Another asserts that Otman Baba stayed in Tarnovo as the guest of the local kadi (judge) and that locals bestowed the mystic with gifts after Ottoman forces had captured Constantinople.

Gramatikova dates Otman Baba's arrival in Constantinople to 1456, where he contributed to the charitable activities of every imaret and advocated the restoration of a fortress that he argued was the town of Hasan and Huseyn. After leaving Constantinople, Otman Baba spent time in Edirne with the Abdals and settled in the village of Tatar Köyü, which Gramatikova supposes is either the present-day village Radovets or Filipovo—both in the Topolovgrad municipality of Bulgaria.

=== Death ===
In Tatar Köyü, Otman Baba predicted to his followers that they would develop into two branches. Physically weakening, he relocated near Haskovo, where he urged his followers to build mills and grow vineyards and claimed to follow an incomparable mystical path: "First I was a secret and I shall again become a secret. Nobody walks before me on my road nor would anybody come after me".

On 13 January 1478, Otman Baba and his disciples arrived at the unidentified village of Konukçu köy. He settled on the nearby riverbank opposite his followers and ordered them to construct a bridge "to go back to the place where [they] were before". After the bridge was built, Otman Baba spoke his last words: "Hey, destitute, miserable and feeble, you are afraid of Death. But I am not. In fact I am immortal, I have a horse, when I mount it I go to Heaven!" According to a manuscript annotation, Otman Baba died on 8 Receb 1478. The vilâyetname describes Otman Baba's body releasing a halo that lit the universe the day after his death and two disciples dreaming that Otman Baba rode a horse through a portal in the sea.

== Beliefs ==
Gramatikova states that Otman Baba followed the Khurasan-region Malamatiyya, a tradition characterized by its adherents' independence of a director, a school, or conventional religious laws. Representing the doctrines of the halo of Muhammad and of the Perfect Man, Otman Baba held that the prophet Muhammad's divinity transmitted to the kutb, the highest ranking Sufi mystics. Furthermore, Otman Baba asserted that he—as a kutb—had mastered divine secrets, regarding himself above Ottoman rulers and other mystics and identifying himself as the religious and political figures Muhammad, Jesus, Moses, Huseyn, Timur, and Sultan Mehmed II. Making the heretical claims of omnipresence and omniscience, Otman Baba insisted that anyone who harmed him would be harming themselves by denying his unity with God and that he could see the poor, starving, and ill and aid them. Before his death, Otman Baba expressed his belief in immortality: "Do not cry after me, because I am not dying, I shall live all the time on the earth and in the sky."

Although Otman Baba disapproved of mystics who worked for personal gain, he collected kurbans (livestock) for his Abdals. Illustrating the traits of an Abdal, Otman Baba said the following: "An Abdal is the man who gives up all but Allah. He has passed through all stages of spiritual self-perfection and is guided only by divine love and divine truth. He is no longer a body. Renouncing imitation and subjection to the body he aims at Ayn el-Yakın." Gramatikova interprets the term Ayn el-Yakın under Abdal and Bektashi teachings as experiencing God through God's eyes.

Otman Baba's beliefs extended beyond the spiritual, as he disapproved of Turks speaking Persian and Arabic instead of their native tongue. Otman Baba maintained that "the Oghuz language is the father of all languages" and the "only way to stay in the alien, unknown lands".

== Legacy ==
Categorized by Markoff as a dervish branch of the Muslim Alevi (Alians), Qizilbash, and Shi'ites, the Baba'is have preserved their traditions in Bulgaria through the cult of Otman Baba. In Nova Zagora, the Kizilbash venerate the life of Otman Baba, considering him a local Shi'ite saint and regarding his tekke as their primary holy place in Bulgaria. According to Gramatikova, the vilâyetname of Otman Baba is a canonical text in Bulgaria's Muslim community.

=== Cult complex ===
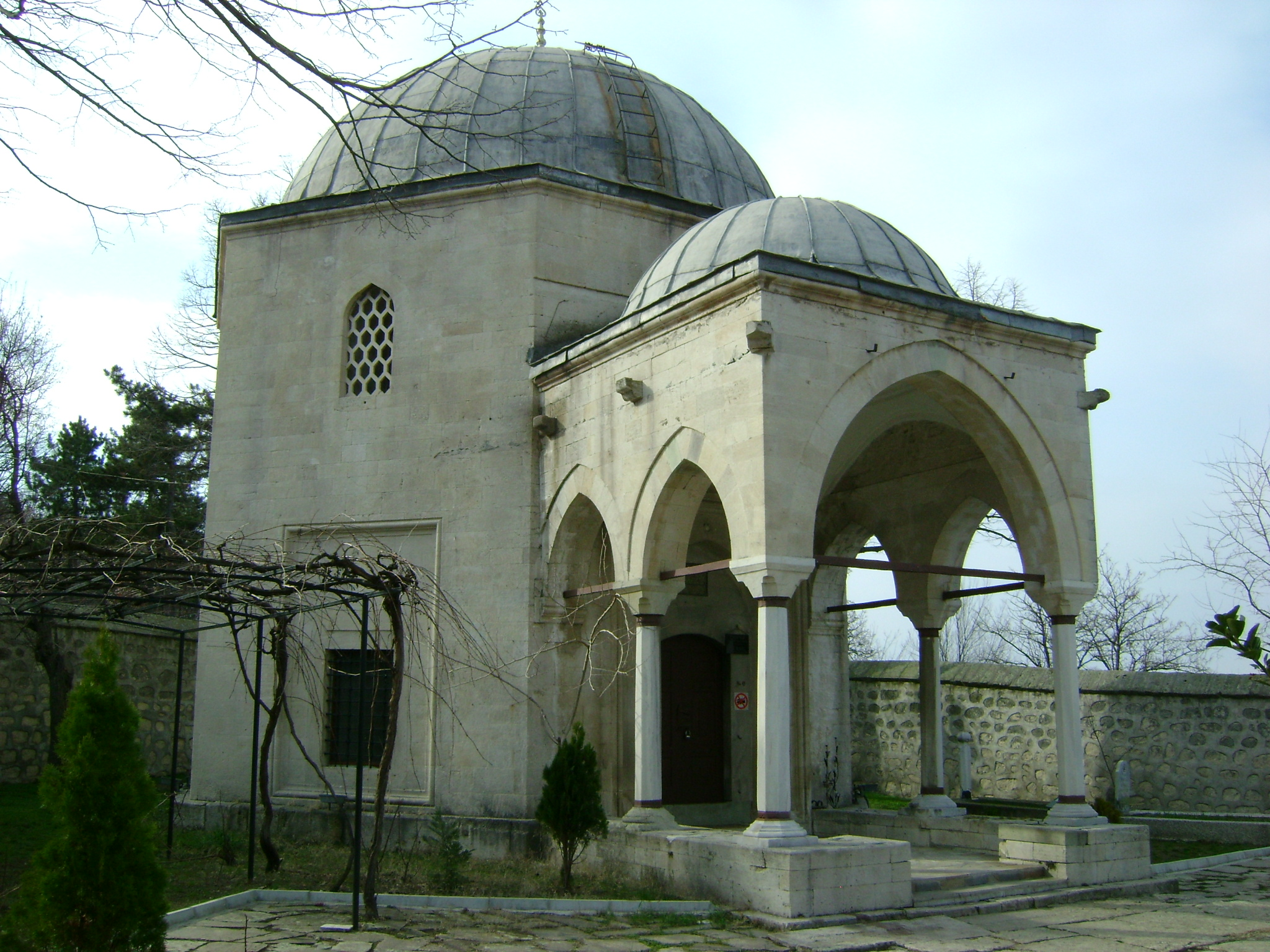
The türbe of Otman Baba in Teketo, Bulgaria

Although Otman Baba had rejected Mehmed II's offers to build him a tekke, the mystic's followers developed a cult complex around his grave, located at the southeastern part of the Hızırilyas hill in the Haskovo-region village of Teketo. Evliya Çelebi reported a cloister near the Maden dere riverbank and credited Sultan Bayezid II for the construction of the tekke, which included a heptagonal refectory, shaped like a dervish cap and associated with the yediler (cult of the seven). Architectural historian Stephen Lewis also proposes the yediler symbolism of the seven-sided refectory—the türbe (mausoleum)—which he classifies as an early sixteenth-century Ottoman funerary monument, observing its domed structure and ashlar masonry. Gramatikova notes, however, that in 1492 Sultan Bayezid II blamed Otman Baba's followers in Thrace for an assassination attempt on him and ordered their exile to Asia Minor. Nevertheless, the complex became a pilgrimage site for Otman Baba's followers, Muslim locals, and the Romani—who, according to Ottoman documents, have venerated the türbe since at least 1568. Bulgarian scholar Markoff attributes the continued prominence of Otman Baba's cult complex among Bulgarian miracle-seekers to its museum status during communism and protection during the Revival Process.
