= Buyruks =

Religious literature of Alevism

The Buyruks are a collection of spiritual books providing the basis of the Alevi value system. Buyruk means “command” or “order” in Turkish. Topics addressed in the Buyruks include müsahiplik ("spiritual brotherhood") and a wide range of Alevi stories and poems, including the story of Haji Bektash Veli.

The Buyruks also contain Quranic verses, the sayings of Ali and the Twelve Imams, as well as sayings and songs written by Yunus Emre, Pir Abdal Musa, Pir Sultan Abdal, and Ismail I, known by his pen name Khata'i.

Some Buyruks are attributed to Safi-ad-Din Ardabili, while others are attributed to Ja'far al-Sadiq.

== Authority ==
The "Buyruks" include pillars which dedes must uphold and Alevis must also generally adhere to the rules put forth in them.
