= Haqq–Muhammad–Ali =

Mystical communion doctrine in Alevism

Haqq–Muhammad–Ali is a doctrine of mystical communion in Alevism that involves Haqq ('Truth', referring to the divine nature of Allah), Muhammad ('Yol' or sunnah, referring to the jem), and Ali (Nūr, referring to the Awliya).

== The concept of Ittihad in Alevism ==
In Alevi thought, there are three creative principles: the latent breath called Haqq or Allah; the prototypal human, who is made up of active and passive principles called Yol, Sunnah, or Muhammad (the Jem); and the divine light called Nur, which is expressed as Ali. Communion (ittihad) in Alevism is not comparable with the Christian Trinity, whose three personas are the Father, the Son and the Holy Spirit, nor with the Hindu tritheistic Trimurti of Brahma, Shiva and Vishnu, and not with polytheistic ancient Egypt in Osiris, Isis and Horus, one cannot accurately depict such examples as being representative of the Haqq–Muhammad–Ali communion (ittihad), since according to Alevi or Bektashi beliefs (wahdat al-mawjud), only Allah is a real entity, Muhammad and Ali being simple manifestations of the way (Yol) and the light (Noor) of Allah (Haqq) and not of Allah himself, hence they are neither equal to it nor separate independent entities.

== See also ==
- Ghulat
- Proto-Indo-Iranian religion
- Proto-Indo-European religion
- Religious humanism
- Sufism
- Trinity
