= Kamba language (disambiguation) =

Kamba language (Kenya)

Kamba may also refer to:

- Kaamba language (Congo)
- Kamba language (New Guinea)
- an alternative name for Chiriguano Guarani
- Kamba people of Brazil, who identify as and speak Chiquitano

== See also ==
- Kamba (disambiguation)
