= Kamba =

Kamba may refer to:

- Kamba African Rainforest Experiences, a collection of eco-luxury lodges in the Republic of Congo
- Kamba people of Kenya
- Bena-Kamba, a community in the Democratic Republic of the Congo
- Khampa, also spelled Kamba, Tibetan people of Kham
- Kamba or Kambar (poet), 12th-century Indian poet, writer of the Ramavataram, a Tamil-language version of Ramayana

== See also ==
- Kamba language (disambiguation)
- Kambar (disambiguation)
