= Müsahiplik =

Musahiplik or Müsahiplik (roughly, "Companionship / Spiritual brotherhood") is a covenant relationship between two men of the same age, preferably along with their wives. In a ceremony in the presence of a dede the partners make a lifelong commitment to care for the spiritual, emotional, and physical needs of each other and their children. After the Hijra, the Islamic prophet Muhammad instituted brotherhood between the emigrants, Muhajirun, and the helpers, Ansar, and he chose Ali as his own brother. This early Islamic practice has survived and continued to exist only in the Alevi sect of Islam. This early Islamic practice ceased to exist in all other Islamic sects.

== Mânevî Kardeşlik ==
The ties between couples who have made this commitment is at least as strong as it is for blood relatives, so much so that müsahiplik is often called spiritual brotherhood (manevi kardeşlik). The children of covenanted couples may not marry.

== Four Doors and Öz Verme Ayini ==
Krisztina Kehl-Bodrogi reports that the Tahtacı identify musahiplik with the first gate (şeriat), since they regard it as a precondition for the second (tarikat). Those who attain to the third gate (marifat, "Irfan") must have been in a musahiplik relationship for at least twelve years. Entry into the third gate dissolves the musahiplik relationship (which otherwise persists unto death), in a ceremony called Öz Verme Ayini ("ceremony of giving up the self").

=== Âşinalık, peşinelik, and cıngıldaşlık ===
The value corresponding to the second gate (and necessary to enter the third) is aşinalık ("intimacy," perhaps with God). Its counterpart for the third gate is called peşinelik; for the fourth gate (hakikat, Ultimate Truth), cıngıldaşlık.
