= Al-Haqq =

Arabic word for truth

Haqq (Arabic: حقّ, romanized: ḥaqq,) is the Arabic word for 'truth'. In Islamic contexts, it is also interpreted as right and reality. Al-Ḥaqq (الحقّ), 'the Truth', is one of the names of God in the Qur'an. It is often used to refer to God as the ultimate reality in Islam.

== See also ==
- Abdul Haq (disambiguation)
- Allahu Haqq
- Haqiqa
- Haqq–Muhammad–Ali, mystical communion doctrine in Alevism
