= Gambarov =

Gambarov (Azerbaijani: Qəmbərov, Russian: Гамбаров) is an Azerbaijani masculine surname, its feminine counterpart is Gambarova. It may refer to

- Elshan Gambarov (born 1972), Azerbaijani football midfielder
- Salman Gambarov (born 1959), Azerbaijani jazz pianist and composer
