= Cemevi =

Place of worship of the Alevi

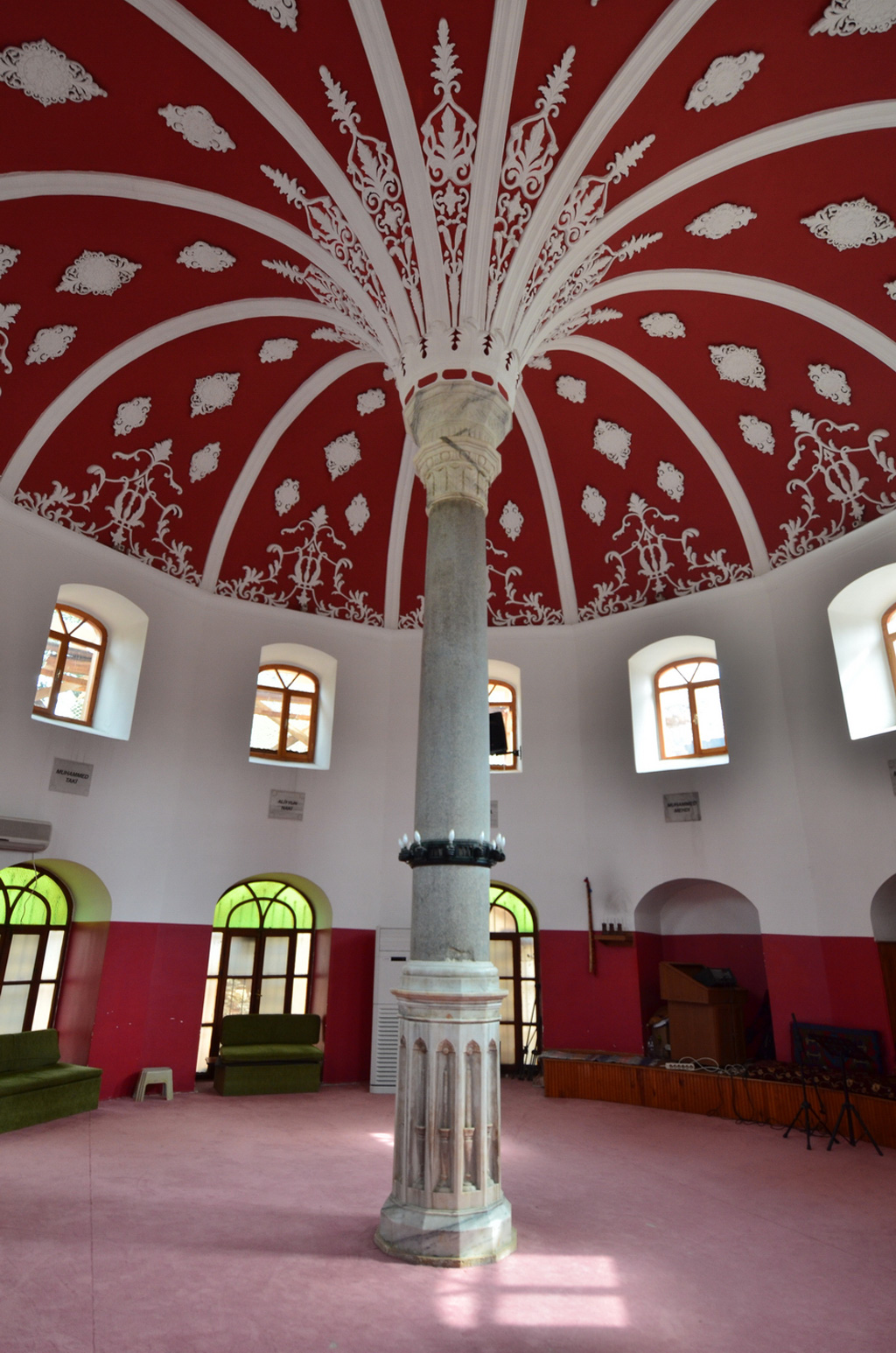
Interior of the historical Şahkulu Sultan Dergahi Cemevi in Kadıköy, Istanbul.

A cemevi or cem evi (pronounced and sometimes written as djemevi; meaning literally "a house of gathering" in Turkish) is a place of fundamental importance for Turkey's Alevi-Bektashiyyah tariqa populations. Certain Alevi organizations describe cemevis as places of worship, and ask for this to be officially recognized. However, the Directorate of Religious Affairs of Turkey does not recognise cemevis as Muslim places of worship, and only recognises Sunni and Ja'fari-Shi’ite mosques.

== A place of gathering for Bektash’īyyah tariqa ==
It is primarily considered a place of assembly (Cem; pronounced djam, from Arabic الجمع, al-jamʕ). Historically, the cems were usually held outdoors, using candles and torches to light up the place of gathering when it got dark. Often, people from nearby places would come to a cem to have a collective meal. The participants would often bring along food, which they would then distribute during the meal. Nowadays, some of these customs are still preserved. Men and women conduct cem activities and rites together.

The structuring of cemevi as into their present characteristics and rites owes much to the Bektashi tradition within various historical currents of Turkey's Alevi culture. Urbanization of many Alevis also brought changes in the conception of cem. In larger towns in Turkey today, cemevi are multi functional buildings where a broad range of cultural activities take place. In Turkey, it is always problematic for a cemevi to get off the ground, due to strict state interference in religious matters, and cases of discrimination against the Alevis, which results in the founding of each cemevi acquiring political dimensions and necessitating case-by-case lobbyism.

The vast majority of Alevis consider themselves to be Muslims, a view shared by the Turkish state. There is some disagreement as to whether Alevism should be considered a religious tradition at all. Some Alevis may describe it as a subethnic solidarity and/or cultural tradition. For those who recognize it as religious, they consider it a form of Islam (often, a branch of Shi'ism), while a few claim it to represent an independent, non-Islamic religion (a radical position held by relatively few adherents). Relations with Turkey's Sunni majority are difficult, though some dialogue has occurred. Besides historical or theological grievances, the issues often center around outbreaks of anti-Alevi violence, complaints of systematic discrimination, and official non-recognition of Alevi identity. The latter has resulted in attempts to assimilate Alevis into a Sunni-dominated Islam, e.g. through the construction of state-funded mosques, or compulsory religious education which excludes or marginalizes Alevi practices and teachings.

Former Deputy Prime Minister of Turkey Bekir Bozdağ indicated in 2013 that a total of 329 cemevis had been established since the incumbent Justice and Development Party had come to power on Nov. 3, 2002.

== Cemevi in Istanbul ==
- Erikli Baba Cemevi (Zeytinburnu)
- Firuzköy Cemevi (Avcılar)
- Maltepe Cemevi (Maltepe)
- Garip Dede Cemevi (Küçükçekmece)
- Okmeydanı Cemevi (Okmeydanı, Beyoğlu)
- Gazi Cemevi (Gazi Mahallesi, Gaziosmanpaşa)
- Sarıgazi Cemevi (Sarıgazi, Ümraniye)
- Kartal Cemevi (Kartal)
- Gürpınar Cemevi (Gürpınar, Büyükçekmece)
- Şahkulu Sultan Cem Kültür Merkezi (Göztepe, Kadıköy)
- Haramidere Cemevi (Haramidere, Büyükçekmece)
- Tuzla Aydınlıköy Cemevi (Tuzla)
- Karacaahmet Cem Kültür Merkezi (Üsküdar)
- Yenibosna Cemevi (Yenibosna, Bahçelievler)
- Bağcılar Cemevi (Bağcılar/İstanbul)

== See also ==
- Ashurkhana
- Jamatkhana
- Imambargah
- Khalwatkhana
- Khanaqa
- Mejlis
- Musallah
- Hussainia
- Tekkes
- Malamatiyya
- Mawlawiyyah
- Hurufiyya
- Rifa'iyya
- Qadiriyya
- Galibi Order
- Qalandariyya
- Bektashiyyah
- Naqshbandiyyah
- Zahediyya
- Khalwatiyya
- Bayramiyya
- Safaviyya
- Nusayriyya
- Kızılbaş
