= Dede (religious figure) =

Socio-religious leader

A dede (also called dedebaba) (means grandfather in Turkish) is a socio-religious leader in the Islamic Alevi and non-Islamic Ishiki community. It is one of the 12 ranks of Imam in Alevism. The institution of dede is the most important of all the institutions integral to the social and religious organization of the Anatolian Alevis. Although much weakened as a result of the socio-economic transformation experienced in Anatolia towards the end of the nineteenth century, and particularly due to accelerated migration from the rural to the urban areas after the foundation of the Republic of Turkey, it played a primary role in the survival of Alevism until today. A descendant of a Dede is called a Hearth.

The institution of dedes is based on a three tiered hierarchy:

1. Murshid
2. Pir
3. Rehber

In some regions this hierarchy is modified in such a way that the Pir and Murshid change places. This is exclusively a functional hierarchy, as all involved come from a dede family. They fulfill functions that are complementary in nature, and would be meaningless in isolation from each other. The dede families, all of them called ocakzades, have distributed these duties among themselves.

An Alevi dede focuses on the mystical Islamic teachings of the Twelve Imams, the Buyruks (mainly the Imam Câfer-i Sadık Buyruğu) and Haji Bektash Veli.

== Qualifications ==
According to the books of the Buyruk which include the basic principles of the Alevi faith, and the traditions that survive among the Alevis, a dede must have the following qualifications:

- To be a descendant of the Prophet (ocakzâde/sayyid).
- To operate as an educator and a moral guide (mürebbi) for the community.
- To be knowledgeable and exemplary in his character and manners (Al-Insān al-Kāmil).
- To follow the principles written in the Buyruks, as well as the established traditions of Alevism.

== Functions ==
The main functions of the dedes can be summarized as follows:

- To guide and enlighten (irşad) the community in social and religious matters.
- To lead the religious rituals.
- To punish the criminals, and to serve as an arbiter between conflicting sides.
- To lead ceremonies during occasions such as a wedding or a funeral.
- To fulfill certain legal and educational functions.
- Provide health provisions.
- Provide socio-political leadership.
- In some exceptional cases, such as in the Tunceli province (formerly Dersim), dedes share the leadership position with the large landowners, the Ağas.

== Legal functions ==
For Alevis, the Yol (path) is a very important concept. The pedigrees of the dedes consistently emphasize this by saying “Yol cümleden uludur” [The Path is the most exalted of all]. What is important is the Yol, not the desires and needs of an individual Alevi. All the latter are possible only in conformity with the former. Otherwise, the institution of düşkün would be activated. In other words, an Alevi would become a düşkün if he tries to satisfy his desires and needs without regard for the Yol. As Professor Yusuf Ziya Yörükan noted “Dede declares one a "düşkün" by saying to them "may your face be darkened (yüzün kararsın)". Any more that person is deprived of the law of men."

The following are major crimes that lead one to the state of düşkün:

- killing a person
- committing adultery
- divorce
- marrying a divorcee
- stealing
