= Kambar (given name) =

- Gender: Male
- Language: Kazakh

Origin
- Meaning: great power
- Region of origin: Kazakhstan

Kambar (Kazakh: Қамбар) is a name coming from the Kazakh language. The name means "great power".

== Famous people ==
- Kambar batyr, was one of the great heroes of ancient Kazakhstan.
