= Saʿdiyya order =

Sufi order and Syrian family lineage

Saʿdiyya (سعدية) or Jibawiyya (جباوية) is a Sufi tariqa and a family lineage of Syrian and Shafiʿi identity. It grew to prominence also in Ottoman Egypt, Turkey, and the Balkans and it is still active today. They are known for their distinctive rituals and their role in the social history of Damascus. Like many other tariqas, the Saʿdiyya is characterized by the practice of khawāriḳ al-ʿādāt (deeds transcending the natural order) such as healing, spectacles involving body piercing, and dawsa (trampling), for which they are best known; the sheikh would ride a horse over his dervishes, who were lying face down making a “living carpet” of men. They had a wide appeal among the middle and lower classes. The founder of Saʿdiyya was Saʿd al-Dīn al-Shaybānī al-Jibāwī, who took the tariqa from the Yūnisī and Rifaʽi lines, his dates remain uncertain, but he is thought to have died near Jibā, a few kilometers north of Damascus in 736/1335.

With time, many Damascene Saʿdīs became extremely wealthy through their successful business and their big extension of the baraka they inherited. One of them was Muḥammad ibn Saʿd al-Din (d. 1020/1611), who became a sheikh in 986/1578 and amassed great wealth, and during whose time Saʿdiyya became renown. They often used this wealth to offer a safe haven of hospitality for Ottoman dignitaries at their main zawiya in the turbulent Mīdān quarter. For this and other reasons, there was a lot of competitiveness among the Saʿdīs over the mashaykha.

== Founder ==
The story of Saʿd, after whom the tariqa and its members got the name, plays a symbolic role for the order. Historical details about him and his life are very scarce, and literary production by the members of the tariqa is also hard to find. Besides the aforementioned year of 736/1335 and place near Jiba for his death, which was proposed by D’Ohsson fitting with al-Wāsiṭī’s comments, there are other sources with completely different time periods and places proposed for his birth and death. According to 20th-century Saʿdī awrād, he was born in Mecca in 460/1067 and died in Jiba; al-Nabhānī placed Saʿd in the Mamlūk 8th/14th century. Yūnus al-Shaybānī, the father of Saʿd al-Dīn, is traced genealogically by the Egyptians to Idrīs I. Through him and Saʿd’s mother, Saʿd is considered both Ḥasanī and Ḥusaynī. He spoke of being from the ‘’protectors of Kaʿba’’ and claimed to have been the ‘’sheikh of each tariqa’’ as the direct murid of Muhammad. The story of meeting the Prophet is the turning point of Saʿd’s conversion as he met him, according to the story, when he was young and rebellious.

== History ==
The Saʿdiyya is usually considered to be a Syrian branch of the Rifāʿiyya, especially by European sources. In al-Wāsiṭī’s work on the Rifāʿīs, it is mentioned as khirka Saʿdiyya and in Lane’s note as a "celebrated sect of the Rifāʿees", because of the similarity in practices of the two: loud dhikr, ḍarb al-ṣilāḥ, snake-charming, and ingesting live coals and glass. The two orders are also popular in the same settings. It is noteworthy that the Saʿdiyya never switched from the Shāfiʿī to the Ottoman Ḥanafī madhhab.

=== Syria ===
The first Saʿdī whose existence was attested in contemporary accounts was Ḥasan al-Jibāwī (d. 910 or 914). He came from Hauran to Damascus during the late Mamluk period. It was widely believed that he could cure insanity through miraculous qualities of Basmala. Ḥasan had a son who succeeded him called Ḥusayn (d. 926/1519). He served both the spiritually needy and the worldly rulers of Damascus with generous hospitality at the zāwiya and this practice was continued by his son Aḥmad b. Ḥusayn (d. 963/1555) and later became a Saʿdī trademark. The Saʿdiyya were involved in clashed between the Mīdān and the central authorities, and that lasted throughout the whole Ottoman era. Even though the tariqa had a localist sentiment at times, they usually displayed a strong pro-imperial stance. Some sultans even financially supported the Saʿdiyya like Maḥmūd I, ʿAbd al-Mejīd and ʿAbd al-Ḥamīd II, who financed the renovations of the Jibā Saʿdī shrine. During the Egyptian occupation (1831-9), the Saʿdi were providing a refuge for the resisting factions. An Egyptian contingent raided the zawiya to punish the Mīdānīs for doing that and they captured twenty men for execution or exile. Documents say that the sheikh at that time was either Khalīl al-Saʿdī (d. 1264/1847) or Ibrāhīm b. Muṣṭafā al-Saʿdī (d. 1282/1865).

=== Egypt ===
The order came to Cairo with Yūnus, one of nine sons of Saʿd al-Dīn, according to Egyptian Saʿdī accounts. He is credit with introducing the dawsa, a ceremony which they celebrated biannually. Because of the dawsa, the Saʿdīs play the main role in the story of state regulation of Egyptian tariqas. Khedive Tawfīḳ banned them in 1881 and the prohibition might have been a result of European rather than Muslim reformist pressure. Some people like the anthropologist and colonial official McPherson blamed secular modernism and “Americanism”. With time, Saʿdīs’ position weakened and even though they were at the head of ʿAlī al-Bakrī’s convention of mashāyikh in 1289/1872, they were placed last in the ranks of the official tariqas processions in 1905. In modern times, Sheikh Ḥamūda al-Khuḍarī disallowed music in the dhikr as well as dancing and self-mutilation “in the houses of God”. The current sheikh is ʿAlī b. Ḥamūda al-Khuḍarī. He claims authority over all of the Saʿdīs from the Bāb al-Naṣr zāwiya in Syria. The tariqa is especially popular in Upper Egypt. It is worth noting that the Cairene mashaykha was passed two times to matrilineal descendants.

=== Turkey ===
Abu ’l-Wafāʾ al-Shāghūrī’s visits to Turkey in the 12th/18th century most likely represent the earliest spread of the Saʿdiyya. There are two other transmissions: by Sheikh ʿAbd al-Salām (d. 1165/1751) and by Sheikh ʿUthmān from Kastamonu. In 19th-century Istanbul out of 259 opportunities to attend various dhikrs every week, 26 were Saʿdi. There were 25 Saʿdi takyas mentioned in the last official survey of Istanbul takyas and the figure is considered to be similar for the turn of the 20th century. Ottoman state tried to institutionalize the orders in Turkey on the Mawlawī and Baktāshī "mother zāwiya" model. In the same year, Muḥammad ʿAlī gave Muḥammad al-Bakrī leadership over the Egyptian tariqas (1812) and Sultan Maḥmūd II ordered all Saʿdī takyas to recognize the Sheikh ʿAbd al-Salām as their āsitāna.

=== Balkans ===
The most important implantation of the order outside Syria, Egypt, and Turkey is in the Balkans and it continues to live today. There was a strong bond between the local Saʿdī leaders there and the Damascene Saʿdīs, who issued khilāfāt-nāma to the āsitānas in Đakovica and Prizren. Dates for the Saʿdi arrivals are uncertain, but some Saʿdī takyas were established by the 18th century in Kosovo, Macedonia, Southern Serbia, and Belgrade. They joined eight other orders in 1947 and formed an organization different from the official Sunnī community and a similar body was founded in Albania in 1936, called “Divine Light”. Abu ’l-Wafāʾ al-Shāghūrī initiated the founder of the Saʿdiyya-ʿĀdjiziyya in Albania, Adjize Baba, into the order in Istanbul. Adjize Baba constructed the first Saʿdī tekke in Đakovica in 1111/1699.

== Beliefs and practices ==
Even though there are not a lot of texts documenting the belief system and the practices of the order, some of them are known to have been there since their beginning. Saʿdiyya members were known for their healing ‘’powers’’; it was believed that the Saʿdi masters could cure the insanity of people possessed by a jinn and as such, masters were thought to have been friends of God, who has given them permission and power to do so. For that reason, many believers paid visits to them in order to profit from their company. They were also known to have regularly practiced dhikr and sama and not only in their order’s quarters but also in the Umayyad mosque.

=== Saʿdiyya praying formulas ===
The small praying formula: an action of reciting in the morning and in the evening in a specific order and a certain number of times. It includes reading (Al-Fatiha, Al-Ikhlas, Al-Mu'awwidhatayn, the beginning and the end of surah Al-Baqarah with ayah Tawhid and ayah Al-Kursi), praying for blessings upon Muhammad, seeking forgiveness, remembrance of God, and supplication.

The middle praying formula: an action of reciting in the morning and in the evening in a specific order and a certain number of times. It includes what is said in the small praying formula, only a different number of times.

The big praying formula: an action of reciting daily in a specific order and a certain number of times. It includes remembrance of God with seven of His most beautiful names, each one separately. Switch from one name to another happens only after sheikh’s signal and the number of repetitions ranges between 10,000 and 100,000.

These names are: “There is no god but Allah” (لا أله إلا الله), Allah (الله), He (هو), Living (حي), Unique/Single (واحد), Subsisting/Independent (قيوم), and Subduer/Conqueror (قهار). These three praying formulas are special, but there are many others.

== Saʿdiyya and Samadiyya ==
Samadiyya is alongside Saʿdiyya one of the two main Sufi orders in Damascus. While the Saʿdiyya grew out of Rifaʿiyya, the Samadiyya originated from Qadiriyya, one of the oldest Sufi orders in Islam. Both Qadiriyya and Rifaʿiyya tariqas came from Iraq in the 6th/12th century. Once during a procession, Saʿdi Sufis were beating the drums (tubul) and their people insisted that the instrument is their symbol and must not be usurped. Samadiyya usually used the drums during their dhikr, so the two orders almost fought because of it.

== Taghlibiyya ==
Taghlibiyya is a sub-order of Saʿdiyya and it is traced either to a son or a brother of Saʿd al-Dīn. ʿAbd al-Ḳādir al-Taghlibī (d. 1135/1722) was a great Ḥanbalī scholar, who took fiqh lessons at the Umayyad mosque. He was noted for the dawsa and other karamat, and was known for writing amulets for the ill. Al-Taghlibī was the most famous sheikh of the Taghlibiyya order, which later got its name after him. The members also used the nisba al-Shaybāni for their sub-order. Dhikr used to be held at the ʿAmāra home, but now a diminished dhikr takes place in a location near the Ministry of Awqāf as that is where the Taghlibī house is now.

== Abu l-Wafa’ ==
Ibrahim ʿAbd al-Baqi, also known as Abu l-Wafa’, was Sa’d al-Din's descendent. He was very influential and had many admirers, disciples, and deputies in Istanbul from both the common people and the elite together with the sultan. Thanks to his two zawiyas in the Ottoman capital and in Damascus, the tariqa reached many Turks and Arabs. He was a virtuous man (salih), but at the same time unpractical and maybe even enraptured or possessed (majdhub). Even so, Ibrahim ʿAbd al-Baqi was chosen as the trustee (nazir) of the awqaf of the Umayyad mosque. Having taken advantage of his negligence, the clerks controlled the mosque's administration to their interest.
