= Qutb =

Sufi spiritual leader

The term qutb (Note: also romanized as qutub, kutb, kutub, or kotb) (Arabic: قطب) means 'axis', 'pivot', or 'pole'. Qutb can refer to celestial movements and be used as an astronomical term or a spiritual symbol.

In Sufism, a qutb is the perfect human being, al-Insān al-Kāmil ('The Universal Man'), who leads the saintly hierarchy. The qutb is the Sufi spiritual leader who has a divine connection with God and passes knowledge on which makes him central to, or the axis of, Sufism, but he is unknown to the world.

According to the Institute of Ismaili Studies, "In mystical literature, such as the writings of al–Tirmidhi, Abd al–Razzaq and Ibn Arabi (d. 1240), [qutb] refers to the most perfect human being who is thought to be the universal leader of all saints, to mediate between the divine and the human and whose presence is deemed necessary for the existence of the world."

== Scriptural evidence ==
In the teachings of Al-Hakim al-Tirmidhi, there is evidence to suggest that the qutb is the head of the saintly hierarchy which provides scriptural evidence to support the belief in the qutb. The hadīth attributed to Ibn Mas‘ūd has been used as proof that a qutb exists.

== Temporal qutb and cosmic qutb ==
=== Temporal qutb ===
There are two different conceptions of the qutb in Sufism: temporal qutb and cosmic qutb. The temporal and cosmic qutb are connected, which guarantees that God is present in the world at all times. The temporal qutb is known as "the helper" or al-ghawth and is located in a person on Earth. The cosmic qutb is manifested in the temporal qutb as a virtue which can be traced back to al-Hallaj. The temporal qutb is the spiritual leader for the earth-bound saints. It is said that all beings - secret, animate, and inanimate - must give the qutb their pledge which gives him great authority. The Only beings exempt from this are al-afrād, which belong to the angels; the djinn, who are under the jurisdiction of Khadir; and those who belong to the tenth stratum of ridjālal-ghayb.

Due to the nature of the qutb, the location where he resides, whether temporal or cosmic, is a matter of learned speculation. It is thought by most that the qutb is corporeally or spiritually present in Mecca at the Ka'ba, which is referred to as his maqām.

Sufi language forms a notable style of writing in Persian, which is full of novel spiritual ideas and metaphors, demonstrating a need to refrain from taking its words literally, if such should seem contrary to the teachings of Islam.

=== Cosmic qutb ===
The cosmic qutb is the Axis of the Universe in a higher dimension from which originates the power (ultimately from Allah) of the temporal qutb.

== The cosmic hierarchy of the qutb ==
The cosmic hierarchy forms the manifestation of the way in which spiritual power underpins the existence of the cosmos. Two descriptions of the hierarchy come from notable Sufis. The first is Ali Hujwiri's divine court. There are three hundred akhyār ("excellent ones"), forty abdāl ("substitutes"), seven abrār ("piously devoted ones"), four awtād ("pillars") three nuqabā ("leaders") and one qutb.

The second version is Ibn Arabī’s which has a different, more exclusive structure. There are eight nujabā ("nobles"), twelve nuqabā, seven abdāl, four awtād, two a’immah ("guides"), and the qutb.

== People named Qutb ==
For those named Qutb ad-Din, with many variant transliterations, see Qutb ad-Din.

== Buildings ==
- Qutb complex, a group of monuments and buildings at Mehrauli in Delhi, India
- Qutb Minar, a tall brick minaret in Delhi, India
