= Qambar (person) =

Companion of Ali ibn Abi Talib

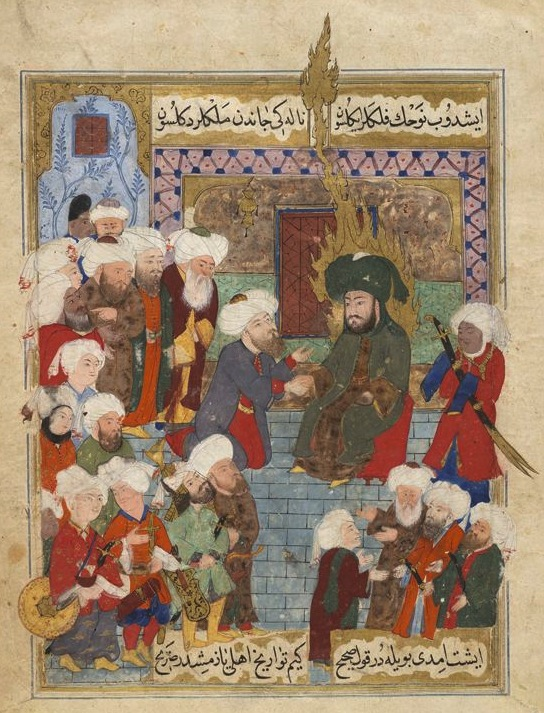
Zulfiqar sword depicted in the hands of Qanbar, carrying it for his master, Ali.

Qambar (Arabic: قنبر), also spelt Qanbar, was a companion and slave of Ali. He was considered one of Ali's closest companions. He was killed by Al-Hajjaj ibn Yusuf in the Battle of Siffin.
