= Rehber (Alevism) =

In Alevism, a Rehber is one of the 12 ranks of Imam in Alevism. A Rehber assists the Pir, provides information to the newcomers and prepares them for commitment to the Alevi path or Tariqat. Rehbers visit various settlements and collect information on the problems and inform Pirs about these problems.
