= Abdal =

Rank of sainthood in Islamic thought

Abdāl (Arabic: أبدال) lit: substitutes, but which can also mean "generous" [karīm] and "noble" [sharīf]) is a term used in Islamic metaphysics and Islamic mysticism, both Sunni and Shiite, to refer to a particularly important group of God's saints. In the tradition of Sunni Islam in particular, the concept attained an especially important position in the writings of the Sunni mystics and theologians, whence it appears in the works of Sunni authorities as diverse as Abu Talib al-Makki (d. 956), Ali Hujwiri (d. 1072), Ibn Asakir (d. 1076), Khwaja Abdullah Ansari (d. 1088), Ibn Arabi (d. 1240), and Ibn Khaldun (d. 1406).

It is a rank of forty saints, but more often the larger group of 356 saints in Sufi hagiography. In this theology it is said that they are only known to and appointed by Allah, and it is through their operations that the world continues to exist. The term over time has come to include a greater hierarchy of saints, all of different rank and prestige.

== Etymology ==
"Abdal" is the plural of "Badal" or rather "Badeel", and means "those who get replaced", "those who serve as a partial replacement to the role of the prophets" or "friends of God". The Abdals are the group of true, pure believers in God. They serve God during their lifetime; when they die, they are immediately replaced by another selected by God from a larger group said to be the 500 "Akhyar", i.e., the good ones.

== Leadership ==
The Abdals are headed by their leader, "Al-Ghawth (Sheikh Abdul Qadir Jilani)" ("the Helper"), who resides in Baghdad. This leader is often referred to as the Qutb, which means "Pole" in Arabic. This leader though unknown to the public is usually sought out by all of the lower ranking members of the abdal. At various times in history, shaykhs have been known to publicly claim to be the Qutb, despite the tradition of remaining outside the public eye.

== Function ==
The missions of the Abdals are to be God's merciful subjects everywhere they reside and to render the helping blessing hand to all of God's creatures.

It is said that a Badal exists in each continent. Although the majority live in "Al-Sham (Syria),"...some live in Iraq, some in Lebanon, some in Egypt, some in Antioch, some in al-Massisa, South Africa and others live throughout the rest of the world.". They have divine powers and super-natural abilities. A person does not recognize that he is one of the Abdal until he becomes aware of his status suddenly through a revelation. It is said that a Badal can be identified through his continuous good deeds and forgiving nature. He may be rich or poor, married or bachelor, child or adult. Such concepts are established in the Sunni branch of Islam, and in particular in the latter's original Sufi schools of spiritual disciplines.

The abdal function as the keepers of equilibrium in the world and preserve it between the times when prophets are present. Varying in classification and denomination, the identity of the abdal are entirely unknown to the public and even to themselves. With the ability to transmit blessings (baraka) and perform miracles (karāmāt) the abdal as a whole are able to adequately fill the role of prophet. Similarly, it is believed that when judgement day comes, they will act as intermediaries (šafāʿa) between God and the human race.

== Number ==
As far as the number of the abdal is concerned, there are 300 servants of Allah in the creation whose hearts are like that of Adam. There are 40 whose hearts are similar to the heart of Musa and 7 whose hearts are similar to the heart of Ibrahim. There are 5 whose hearts are like that of Jibra’il and 3 whose hearts are like that of Mika’il and one whose heart is like the heart of Israfil. When he (whose heart is like Israfil) dies, then one of the three whose heart is like Mika’il replaces him and one of the five (whose hearts are like Jibra’il) replaces him. One of the seven replaces one of the five, one of the forty replaces one of the seven and one of the 300 replaces one of the forty and a normal Muslim replaces one of the three-hundred. It is due to these 356 awliya that creation are given life and killed, due to them rain falls, vegetation grows and difficulties are removed. It is also believed that since the number of abdal is so near to the number of days in the lunar calendar, their role as a part of the cosmic order of the universe is justified.

== Hierarchy ==
In Sufism, the Abdal are placed in a cosmic hierarchy with other orders of saintly individuals. Two descriptions of the hierarchy come from notable Sufis. One comes from the 12th century Persian Ali Hujwiri. In his divine court, there are three hundred akhyār ("excellent ones"), forty abdāl ("substitutes"), seven abrār ("piously devoted ones"), four awtād ("pillars") three nuqabā ("leaders") and one qutb.

The second version is from Ibn Arabī, who lived in Moorish Spain. It has a more exclusive structure. There are eight nujabā ("nobles"), twelve nuqabā, seven abdāl, four awtād, two a’immah ("guides"), and the qutb.
