= List of Bektashi tekkes and shrines =

This article is a list of Bektashi tekkes (convents or gathering places) and tyrbes (shrines or holy tombs) in Albania, Kosovo, North Macedonia, Greece, and other countries. The list is based on Elsie (2019).

== List ==
| Site | Town or village | Administrative division | Country | Coordinates | Notes |
|---|---|---|---|---|---|
| tekke of Baba Abdullah | Alipostivan | Përmet | Albania | 40°18′N 20°18′E | |
| dervishia of Aranitas | Aranitas | Mallakastra | Albania | 40°35′N 19°48′E | |
| tekke of Baba Fetah | Backë | Skrapar | Albania | 40°29′N 20°24′E | |
| dervishia of Bënça | Bënça | Tepelena | Albania | 40°15′N 20°00′E | |
| tekke of Baba Ali | Berat | Berat | Albania | 40°42′N 19°56′E | |
| tekke of Jusuf Baba | Bllaca | Dibra | Albania | 41°34′N 20°21′E | |
| tekke of Baba Xhafer | Borsh | Saranda | Albania | 40°03′N 19°51′E | |
| tekke of Baba Xhafer | Brerima | Skrapar | Albania | 40°35′N 20°15′E | |
| tekke of Baba Jemin | Bubës i Parë | Përmet | Albania | 40°30′N 20°05′E | |
| tekke of Baba Ali | Bubës i Sipërm | Përmet | Albania | 40°30′N 20°05′E | |
| tekke of Bulqiza | Bulqiza | Bulqiza | Albania | 41°29′N 20°12′E | |
| tekke of Cakran | Cakran | Fier | Albania | 40°36′N 19°37′E | |
| tekke of Çerrica | Çerrica | Skrapar | Albania | 40°40′N 20°15′E | |
| dervishia of Çorrush | Çorrush | Mallakastra | Albania | 40°26′N 19°48′E | |
| dervishia of Beqir Efendi | Delvina | Delvina | Albania | 39°56′N 20°05′E | |
| tyrbe of Baba Kamber | Drisht | Shkodra | Albania | 42°07′N 19°36′E | |
| tekke of Baba Xhelal | Drizar | Mallakastra | Albania | 40°29′N 19°47′E | |
| tekke of Dukaj | Dukaj | Tepelena | Albania | 40°19′N 19°56′E | |
| tekke of Baba Ahmet | Dushk | Gramsh | Albania | 40°47′N 20°20′E | |
| tekke of Ibrahim Xhefai Baba | Elbasan | Elbasan | Albania | 41°07′N 20°06′E | |
| tekke of Baba Ali Horasani | Elbasan | Elbasan | Albania | 41°06′N 20°05′E | |
| tekke of Baba Hamit | Elbasan | Elbasan | Albania | 41°07′N 20°04′E | |
| tekke of Baba Tahir Nasibi | Frashër | Përmet | Albania | 40°21′N 20°25′E | |
| dervishia of Fratar | Fratar | Mallakastra | Albania | 40°31′N 19°48′E | |
| tekke of Shemimi Baba | Fushë Kruja | Kruja | Albania | 41°29′N 19°43′E | |
| Gravel tekke of Asim Baba | Gjirokastra | Gjirokastra | Albania | 40°03′N 20°09′E | |
| Hajdërije tekke of Baba Sulejman | Gjirokastra | Gjirokastra | Albania | 40°05′N 20°08′E | |
| tekke of Baba Zejnel | Gjirokastra | Gjirokastra | Albania | 40°04′N 20°08′E | |
| tekke of Hajdar Baba | Gjonëm/Gjorm | Kurbin | Albania | 41°36′N 19°43′E | |
| tekke of Gjorm | Gjorm | Vlora | Albania | 40°18′N 19°38′E | |
| tekke of Ismail Baba | Gllava | Tepelena | Albania | 40°28′N 19°58′E | |
| tekke of Haxhi Baba Mehmet Aliu | Golimbas | Vlora | Albania | 40°23′N 19°44′E | |
| tekke of Gorisht | Gorisht | Vlora | Albania | 40°28′N 19°39′E | |
| tekke of Baba Husejn | Greshica | Mallakastra | Albania | 40°33′N 19°46′E | |
| tekke of Baba Husejn | Gumen | Përmet | Albania | | Near Panarit and Këlcyra |
| tekke of Hekal | Hekal | Mallakastra | Albania | 40°33′N 19°44′E | |
| tekke of Sinan Pasha | Kanina sq | Vlora | Albania | | (1) Outside the eastern wall of the fortress of Kanina; (2) in the village of Kanina, south of the fortress. |
| tekke of Baba Ismail | Kapaj | Mallakastra | Albania | 40°32′N 19°49′E | |
| tekke of Hasan Dede | Këlcyra | Përmet | Albania | 40°18′N 20°11′E | |
| tekke of Baba Kamber | Kiçok | Tepelena | Albania | 40°25′N 20°04′E | |
| tekke of Baba Islam | Komar | Tepelena | Albania | 40°28′N 19°59′E | |
| tekke of Baba Sadik | Koshtan | Tepelena | Albania | 40°24′N 19°52′E | |
| dervishia of Kosina | Kosina | Përmet | Albania | 40°16′N 20°18′E | |
| tekke of Kostrec | Kostrec | Përmet | Albania | 40°18′N 20°24′E | |
| tekke of Baba Husejn | Krahës | Tepelena | Albania | 40°26′N 19°50′E | |
| tekke of Baba Hasan | Kremenar | Mallakastra | Albania | 40°31′N 19°47′E | |
| tekke of Baba Hasan | Kreshova | Kolonja | Albania | 40°23′N 20°43′E | |
| tekke of Baba Hamza | Kruja | Kruja | Albania | 41°30′N 19°47′E | |
| tekke of Haxhi Jahja Baba | Kruja | Kruja | Albania | | Unknown location |
| tyrbe of Mustafa Dollma | Kruja | Kruja | Albania | 41°30′N 19°47′E | |
| tyrbe of Zemzi Baba | Kruja | Kruja | Albania | 41°30′N 19°47′E | |
| tyrbe of Sari Saltik sq | Kruja, Mount | Kruja | Albania | 41°31′N 19°48′E | |
| tekke of Baba Kasem | Kuç | Devoll | Albania | 40°34′N 20°58′E | |
| tekke of Kuç | Kuç | Skrapar | Albania | 40°36′N 20°17′E | |
| tekke of Baba Rifat | Kuta | Mallakastra | Albania | 40°8′N 19°46′E | |
| tekke of Lavdar | Lavdar | Skrapar | Albania | 40°30′N 20°06′E | |
| tekke of Baba Abedin | Leskovik | Përmet | Albania | 40°08′N 20°36′E | |
| tyrbe of Baba Skënder | Lushnja | Lushnja | Albania | 40°56′N 19°41′E | |
| tekke of Baba Sako | Luz i madh | Kavaja | Albania | 41°06′N 19°34′E | |
| tekke of Baba Musa | Maricaj | Tepelena | Albania | 40°23′N 20°02′E | |
| tekke of Balim Sultan | Martanesh | Bulqiza | Albania | 41°24′N 20°12′E | |
| tekke of Haxhi Hysen Baba | Martanesh | Bulqiza | Albania | 41°25′N 20°12′E | |
| tekke of Baba Salih | Matohasanaj | Tepelena | Albania | 40°21′N 19°49′E | |
| tekke of Mazreka | Mazreka | Korça | Albania | 40°36′N 20°25′E | |
| tekke of Baba Ali Horasani | Mbyet | Fier | Albania | 40°42′N 19°33′E | |
| tekke of Baba Ali | Melan | Gjirokastra | Albania | 39°59′N 20°16′E | |
| tekke of Baba Hysen | Melçan | Korça | Albania | 40°38′N 20°43′E | |
| tekke of Memaliaj | Memaliaj | Tepelena | Albania | 40°21′N 19°58′E | |
| tekke of Ngrançija | Ngrançija | Mallakastra | Albania | 40°38′N 19°43′E | |
| tekke of Baba Iljaz | Osmënzeza | Berat | Albania | 40°33′N 19°53′E | |
| tekke of Pacomit | Pacomit | Përmet | Albania | 40°18′N 20°16′E | |
| tekke of Baba Bektash | Përmet | Përmet | Albania | 40°13′N 20°20′E | |
| tekke of Baba Ali | Përmet | Përmet | Albania | 40°14′N 20°20′E | |
| tekke of Baba Zenel | Përmet | Përmet | Albania | 40°13′N 20°21′E | |
| tekke of Petran | Petran | Përmet | Albania | 40°12′N 20°25′E | |
| dervishia of Baba Hasan | Picar | Gjirokastra | Albania | 40°10′N 20°03′E | |
| Tyrbe of Plasa | Plasa | Korça | Albania | 40°41′N 20°50′E | |
| tekke of Baba Muharrem | Plashnik | Berat | Albania | 40°33′N 19°57′E | |
| tekke of Podgoran | Podgoran | Përmet | Albania | 40°22′N 20°07′E | |
| tekke of Baba Ismail | Polena | Korça | Albania | 40°35′N 20°41′E | |
| tekke of Baba Tahir | Prishta | Skrapar | Albania | 40°25′N 20°13′E | |
| tekke of Progonat | Progonat | Tepelena | Albania | 40°12′N 19°56′E | |
| Tyrbe of Pulaha | Pulaha | Korça | Albania | 40°32′N 20°41′E | |
| tekke of Beqir Efendi | Qatrom | Korça | Albania | 40°35′N 20°44′E | |
| tekke of Haxhi Baba Horasani | Qesaraka | Kolonja | Albania | 40°24′N 20°32′E | |
| tyrbe of Qesarat | Qesarat | Tepelena | Albania | 40°23′N 19°52′E | |
| tekke of Baba Selman | Rabija | Tepelena | Albania | 40°28′N 19°56′E | |
| tyrbe of Rodenj | Rodenj | Përmet | Albania | 40°23′N 20°08′E | |
| dervishia of Rozeç | Rozeç | Tepelena | Albania | | Undetermined location |
| tekke of Baba Sulejman | Sanjollas | Kolonja | Albania | 40°15′N 20°35′E | |
| tekke of Dede Reshat Bardhi | Saranda | Saranda | Albania | 39°52′N 19°57′E | |
| tekke of Baba Mustafa | Shëmbërdhenj | Gramsh | Albania | 40°46′N 20°14′E | |
| tekke of Shkoza | Shkoza | Vlora | Albania | 40°24′N 19°46′E | |
| tekke of Baba Isak | Shullaz | Kurbin | Albania | 41°39′N 19°42′E | |
| tekke of Smokthina | Smokthina | Vlora | Albania | 40°16′N 19°40′E | |
| tekke of Baba Husejn | Starja | Kolonja | Albania | 40°21′N 20°43′E | |
| tekke of Baba Meleq | Straficka | Skrapar | Albania | 40°37′N 20°17′E | |
| tekke of Baba Tahir | Suka | Përmet | Albania | 40°22′N 20°09′E | |
| tekke of Demir Han | Tepelena | Tepelena | Albania | 40°17′N 20°01′E | |
| tekke of Baba Behlul | Therepel | Skrapar | Albania | 40°31′N 20°07′E | |
| Kryegjyshata | Tirana | Tirana | Albania | 41°19′N 19°50′E | |
| tekke of Kulmak | Tomorr, Mount | Berat | Albania | 40°38′N 20°09′E | |
| tekke of Baba Salih Elbasani | Turan | Korça | Albania | 40°37′N 20°44′E | |
| tekke of Baba Ali | Turan | Tepelena | Albania | 40°18′N 19°58′E | |
| tekke of Baba Kamber | Velabisht | Berat | Albania | 40°41′N 19°56′E | |
| tekke of Baba Hysen | Veliqot | Tepelena | Albania | 40°17′N 20°00′E | |
| tekke of Vloçisht | Vloçisht | Korça | Albania | 40°41′N 20°43′E | |
| tekke of Kusum Baba | Vlora | Vlora | Albania | 40°28′N 19°29′E | |
| tekke of Baba Tahir | Vokopola | Berat | Albania | 40°30′N 20°04′E | |
| tekke of Vrëpska | Vrëpska | Korça | Albania | 40°11′N 20°36′E | |
| tyrbe of Baba Hysen | Zërqan | Bulqiza | Albania | 41°30′N 20°21′E | |
| tyrbe of Zhepova | Zhepova | Përmet | Albania | 40°23′N 20°12′E | |
| tekke of Shemseddin Baba | Gjakova | Gjakova | Kosovo | 42°22′N 20°25′E | |
| tekke of Kaçanik | Kaçanik | Kaçanik | Kosovo | 42°13′N 21°15′E | |
| tekke of Mustafa Baba | Mitrovica | Mitrovica | Kosovo | 42°53′N 21°51′E | |
| tekke of Peja | Peja | Peja | Kosovo | 42°39′N 20°17′E | |
| tekke of Baba Adem | Prizren | Prizren | Kosovo | 42°12′N 20°44′E | |
| tekke of Dikmen Baba | Kanatlar | Prilep | North Macedonia | 41°12′N 21°30′E | |
| tekke of Hidër Baba | Kërçova | Kërçova | North Macedonia | 41°30′N 20°57′E | |
| tyrbe of Hidër Baba | Makedonski Brod | Makedonski Brod | North Macedonia | 41°30′N 21°12′E | |
| tekke of Jarar Baba | Poroj | Tetova | North Macedonia | 42°01′N 20°59′E | |
| Monastery of Saint Naum | Saint Naum | Ohrid | North Macedonia | 40°54′N 20°44′E | |
| tekke of Kojun Baba | Shipkovica | Tetova | North Macedonia | 42°01′N 20°54′E | |
| tekkes of Mustafa Baba, Sulejman Baba and Axhem Zade Hasan Efendi | Skopje | Skopje | North Macedonia | 42°00′N 21°26′E | |
| tekke of Ahmet Karadja | Tekija | Ilinden | North Macedonia | 42°00′N 21°39′E | |
| Harabati tekke | Tetova | Tetova | North Macedonia | 42°00′N 20°59′E | |
| tekke of Haxhi Baba | Veles | Veles | North Macedonia | 41°42′N 21°46′E | |
| tekke of Baba Xhafer | Vërtok | Gostivar | North Macedonia | 41°45′N 20°50′E | |
| tekke of Seyyid Ali Sultan | Didymóteichon | Eastern Macedonia and Thrace | Greece | 41°20′N 26°29′E | |
| tekke of Mikro Dereio | Orfeas | Eastern Macedonia and Thrace | Greece | 41°19′N 26°06′E | |
| tekke of Kioutouklou Baba | Selino, Xanthi | Eastern Macedonia and Thrace | Greece | 41°04′N 25°03′E | |
| tyrbe of Musa baba | Thessalonika | Central Macedonia | Greece | 40°38′N 22°57′E | |
| tekke of Salih Baba | Elassona | Thessaly | Greece | 39°53′N 22°11′E | |
| tekke of Durballi Sultan | Farsala | Thessaly | Greece | 39°19′N 22°38′E | |
| tekke of Ali Dede Horasani | Heraklion | Crete | Greece | 35°18′N 25°08′E | |
| tekke of Piri Baba | Juma | West Macedonia | Greece | 40°19′N 21°50′E | |
| tekke of Kasem Baba | Kastoria | West Macedonia | Greece | 40°31′N 21°15′E | |
| tekke of Abdullah Baba | Katerini | Central Macedonia | Greece | 40°16′N 22°29′E | |
| tekke of Hysejn Baba | Konitsa | Epirus | Greece | 40°02′N 20°45′E | |
| tekke of Emine Baba | Odra | Western Macedonia | Greece | 40°19′N 21°08′E | |
| tekke of Emine Baba | Vodhorina | Western Macedonia | Greece | 40°13′N 21°15′E | |
| tekke of Elmali Baba | Vivolyane | Kardzhali | Bulgaria | 41°35′N 25°30′E | |
| turbe of Otman Baba | Teketo | Haskovo | Bulgaria | 41°51′N 25°28′E | |
| tekke of Akyazili Baba | Obrochishte | Dobritch | Bulgaria | 43°23′N 28°03′E | |
| pir evi of Hacı Bektaş Veli | Hacıbektaş | central Anatolia | Turkey | 38°56′N 34°33′E | |
| Mokattam tekke | Cairo | Cairo | Egypt | 30°00′N 31°16′E | |
| First Albanian Bektashi Tekke in America | Taylor | Detroit, Michigan | United States | 42°12′N 83°14′W | |

== Gallery ==
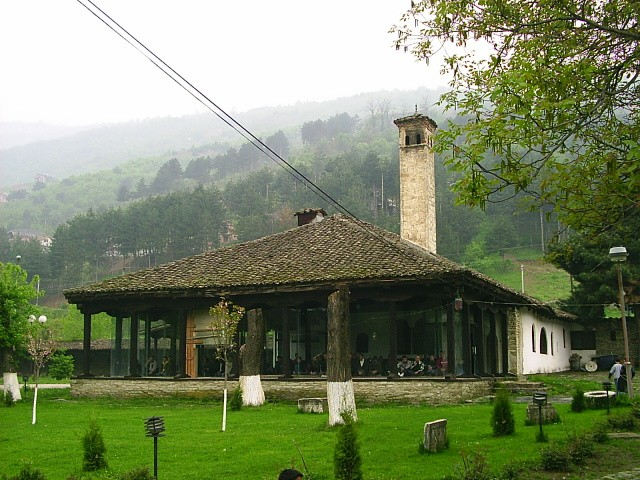
Arabati Baba Tekke, in Tetovo

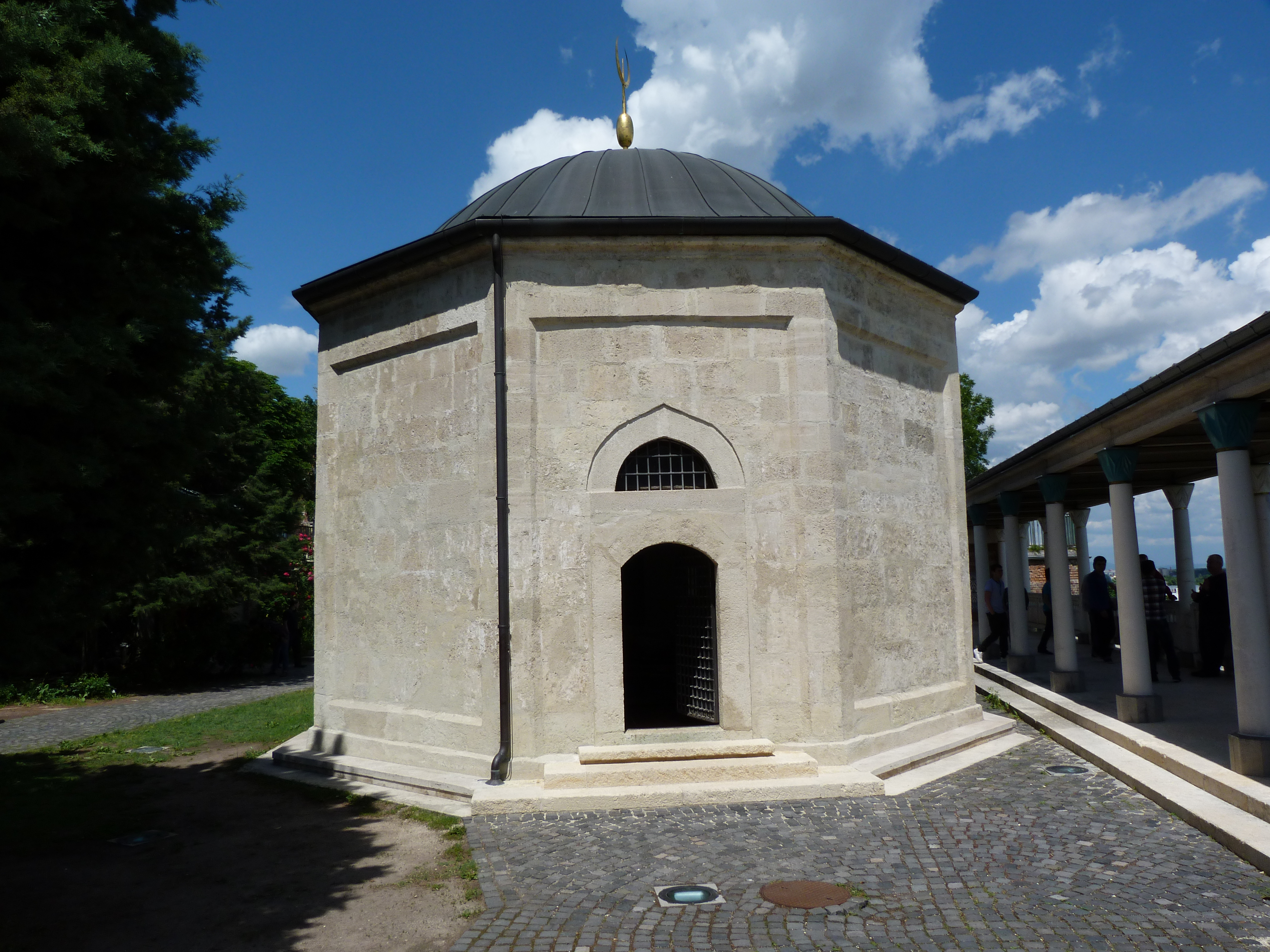
Tomb of Gül Baba in the Buda part of Budapest, Hungary

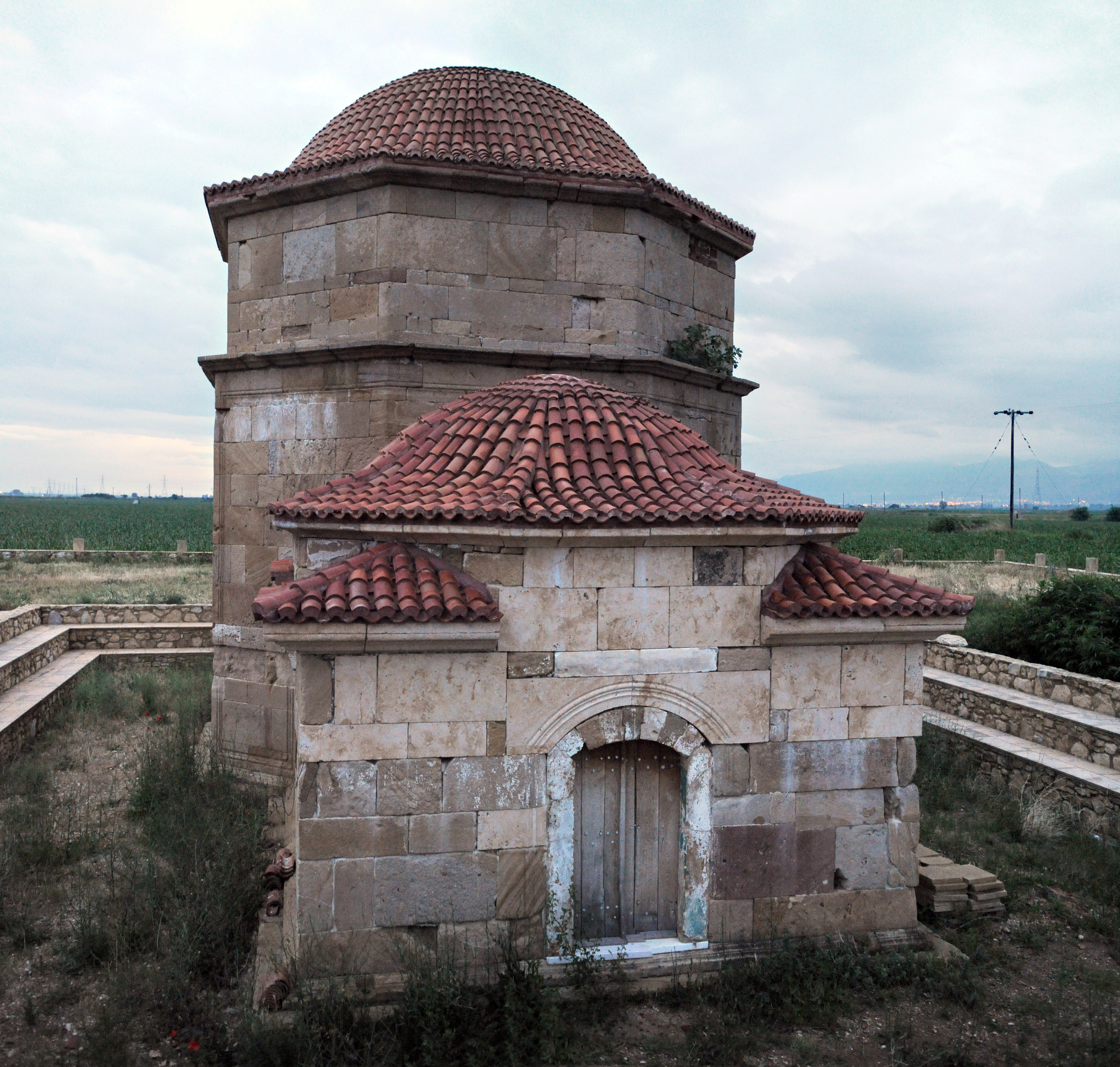
Kutuklu Baba Tekke in Greece

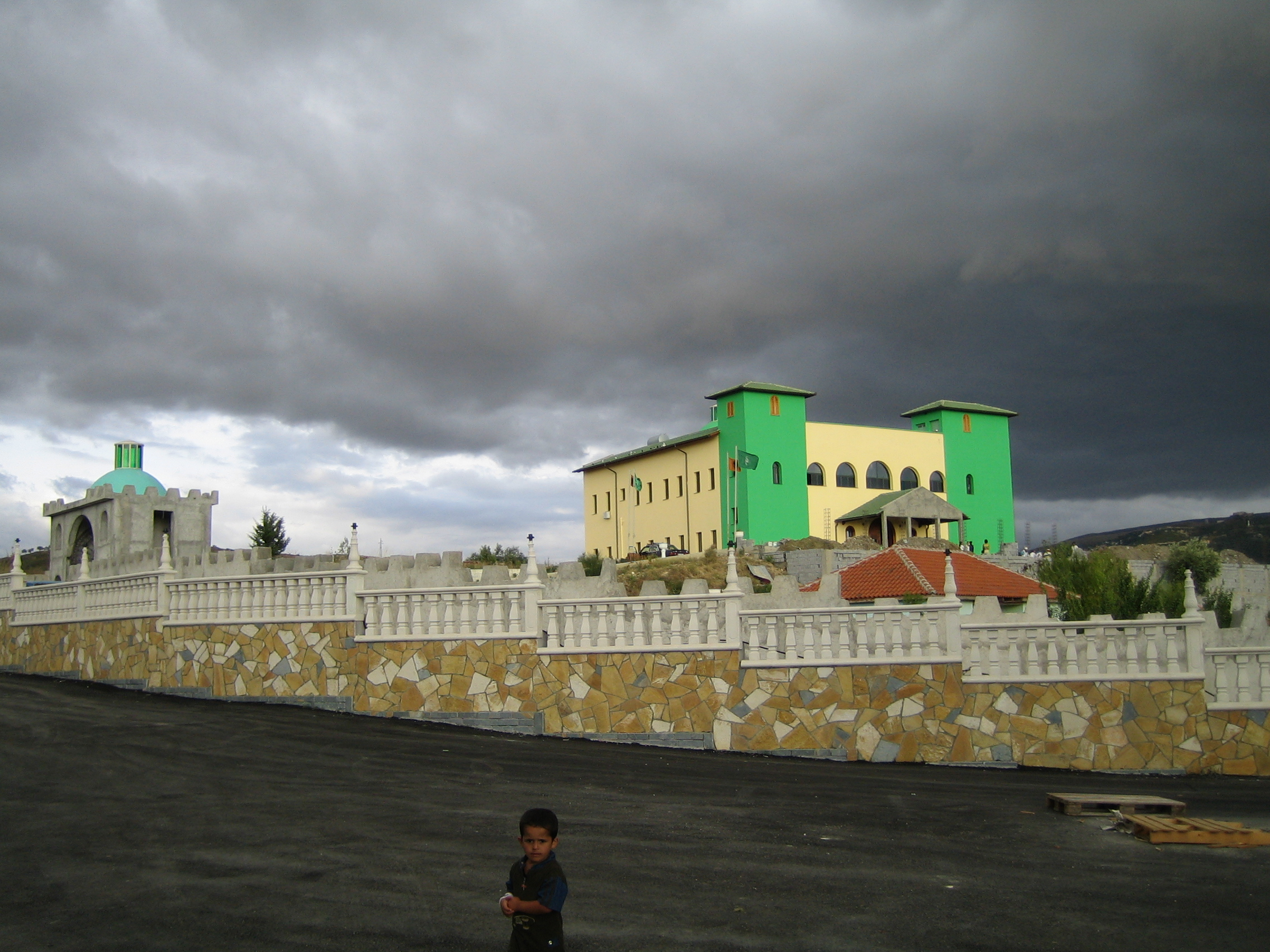
Bektashi tekke on the Kuz-Baba Hill in Vlorë, Albania

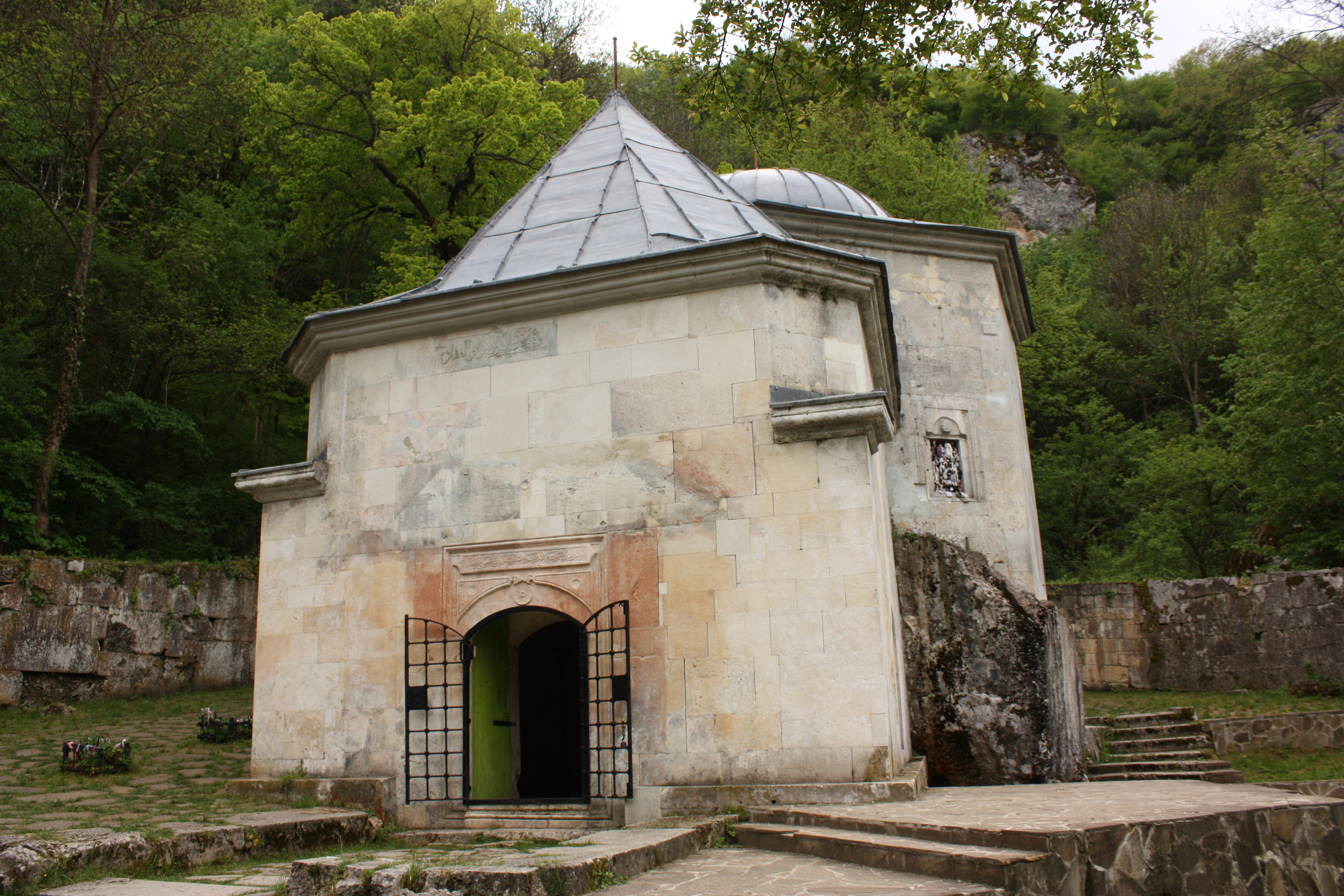
Demir Baba Teke near Sveshtari, Bulgaria (16th century)

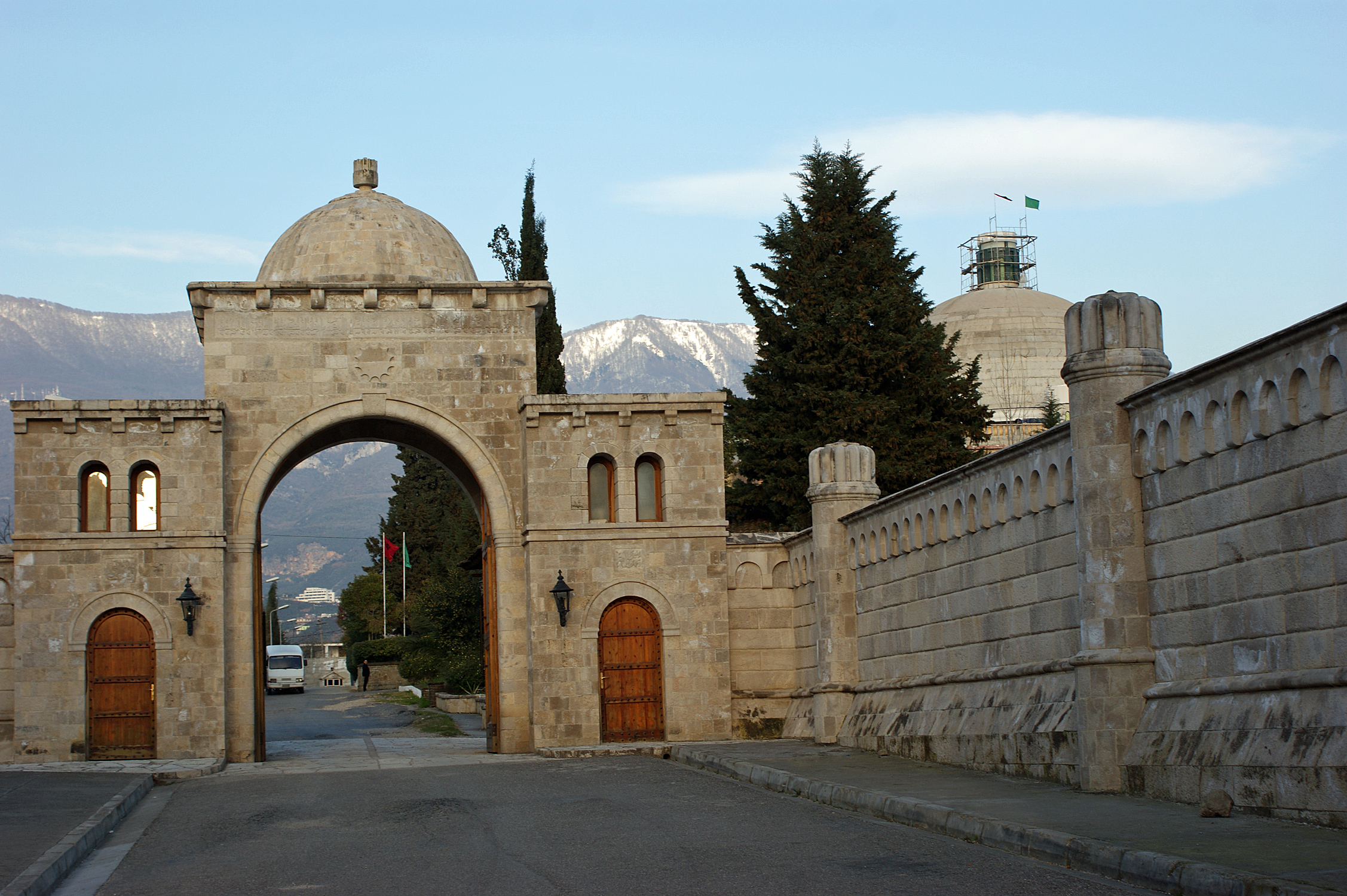
World Headquarters of the Bektashi Community in Tirana, Albania

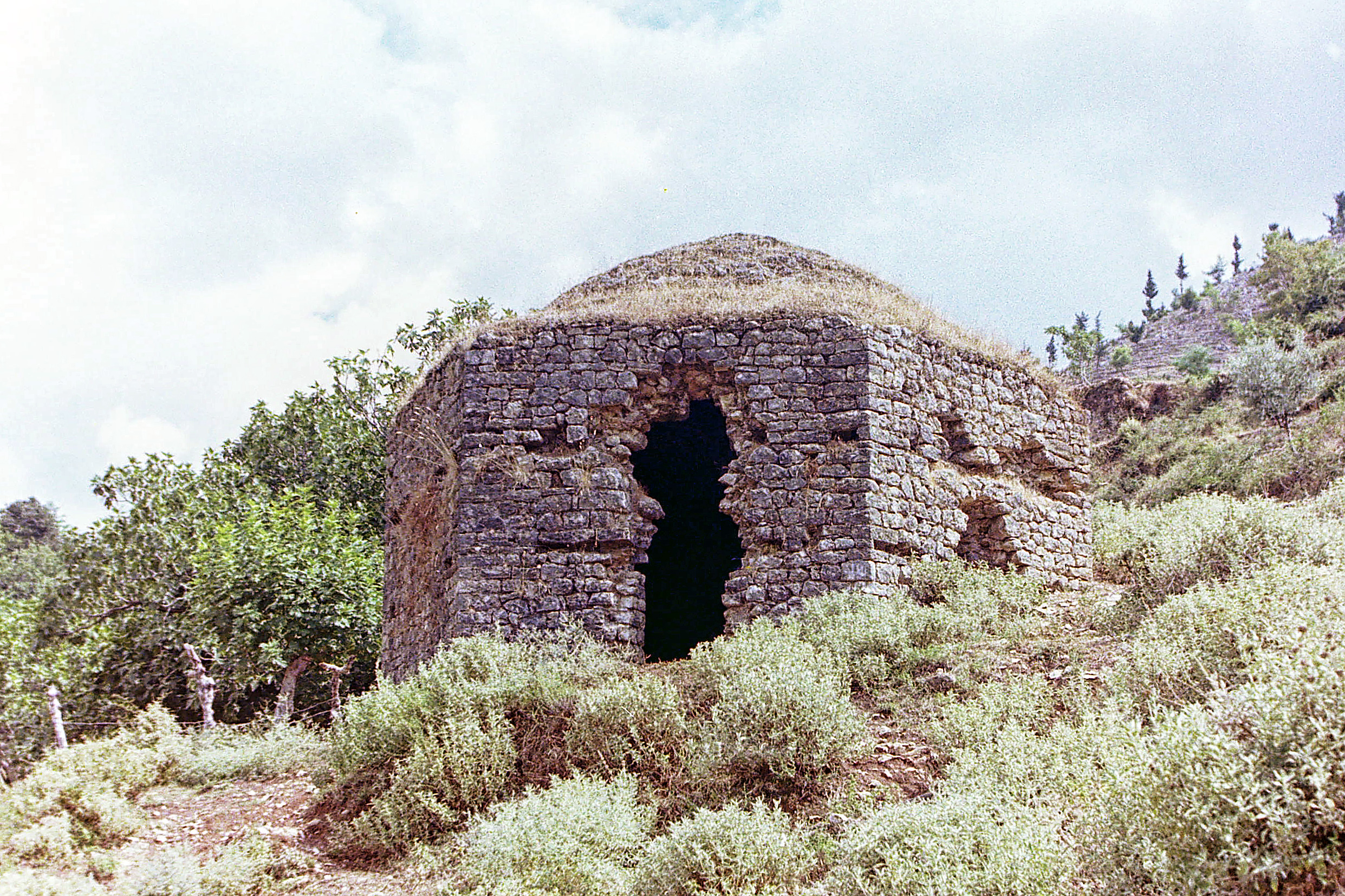
Bektashi tekke ruins near Delvinë

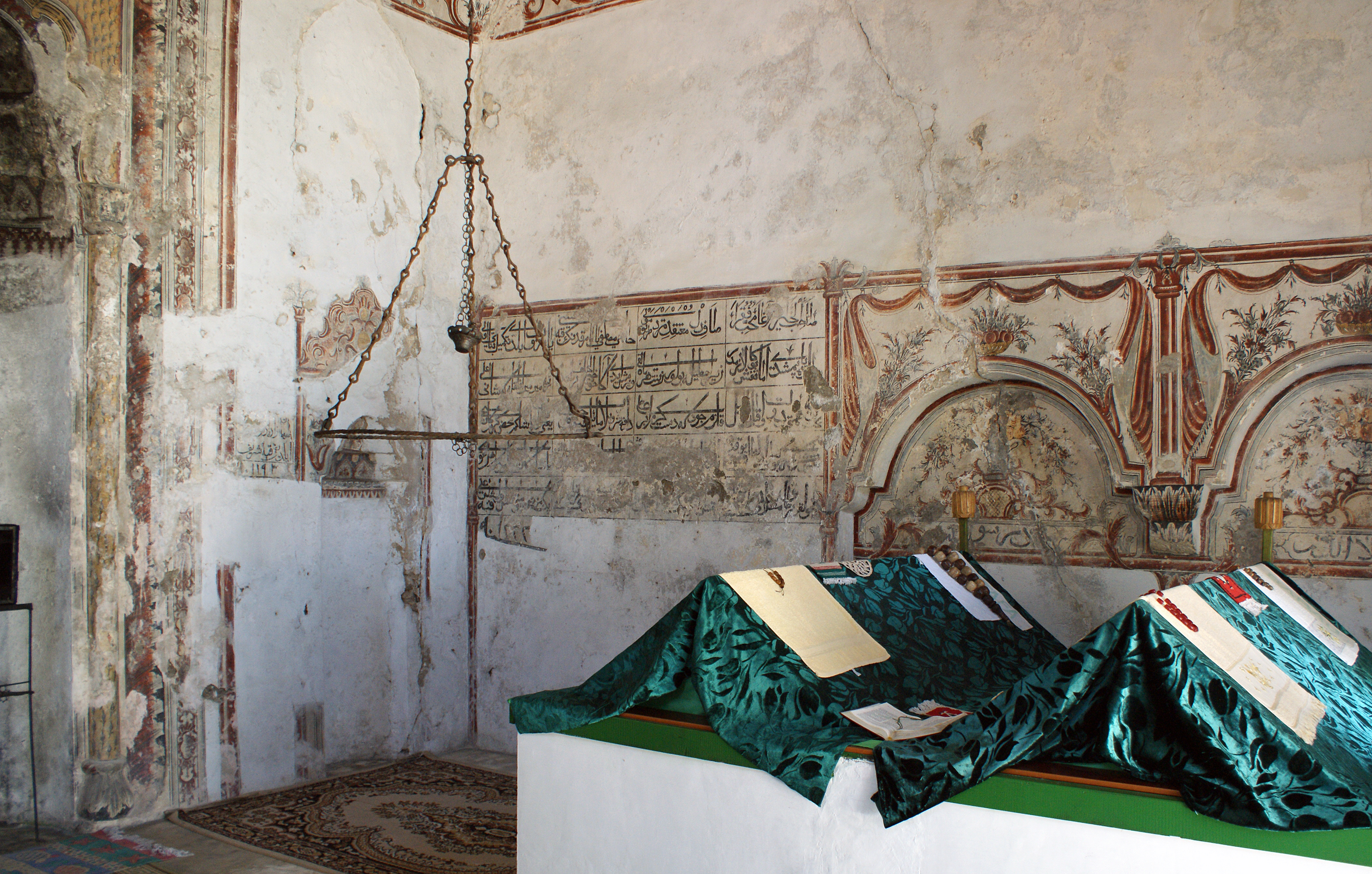
Inside the Dollma Tekke in Kruja Castle, Albania

== See also ==
- List of tekkes in Albania
- List of Religious Cultural Monuments of Albania
- Abbas Ali Türbe
