= Bektashism in Albania =

Islamic Sufi order in Albania

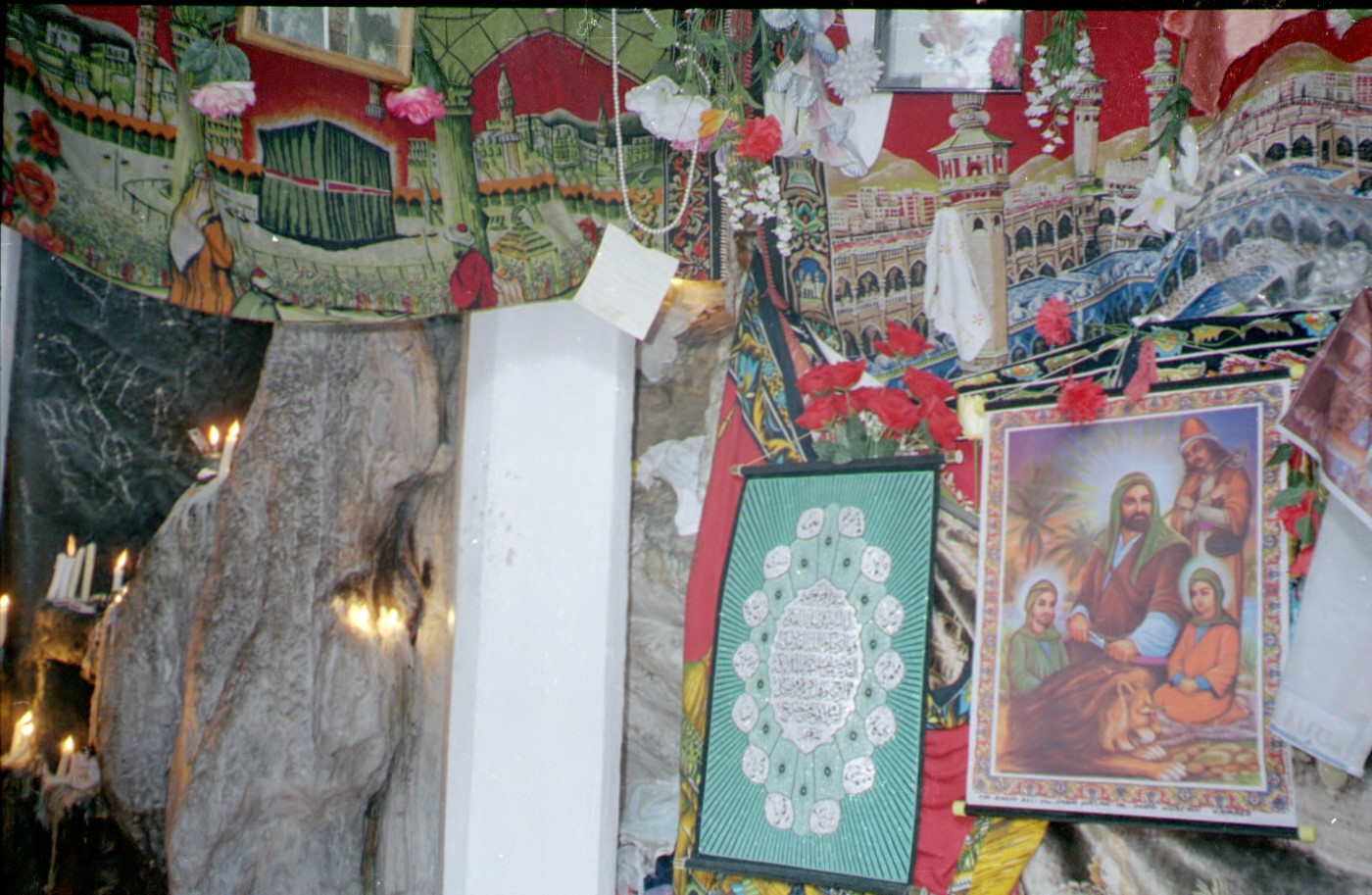
Tyrbe of Sari Saltik, Mount Kruja

The Bektashi Order is an Islamic Sufi order that spread to Albania through Albanian janissaries during the period of Ottoman Albania. The Bektashi make up almost 5% of the country's population. In regards to ethics, the Bektashi adhere to the line "Be master of your hands, your tongue, and your loins" which essentially means do not steal, do not lie or speak idly, and do not commit adultery.

In Albania, the Bektashi Order has taken on a patriotic and nationalistic character, and it has played a major role in the Albanian National Awakening. Bektashi leaders have historically been prominent members in Albanian movements for self-determination and national autonomy, which has contributed to its popularity amongst the Albanians, and for most of Albania's Bektashi community, their affiliation with the order is based on cultural heritage rather than actual religious belief.

The acceptance of Bektashism amongst the Albanians was largely facilitated by the existent Bektashi syncretism between combined pre-Islamic and Shiite elements with Christian elements. These beliefs were quickly replaced by Albanian popular traditions once Bektashism had spread to Albania, and the Bektashi tekkes were primarily situated outside of Albanian towns, which allowed the order to maintain a rural character. Bektashism is perceived as the purest expression of Albanian religiosity, conserving Albanian cultural traditions to the point where it is considered the only truly 'national religion'.

== History ==
=== Ottoman period ===
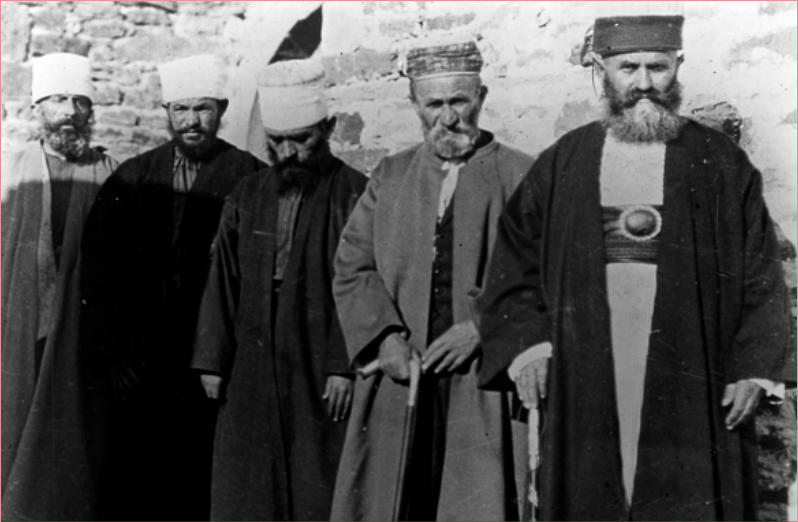
Dervishes at the Bektashi teqe of Përmet, 1904

The Bektashi Order was mainly spread in Ottoman Albania in the 16th century through the Janissaries—members of a high-ranking military social class in the Ottoman Empire consisting of Balkan children who were raised by the Ottoman Turks as part of the Devshirme system—and is first associated with the figure, Sari Saltik (Sari Salltëk in Albanian). Many of the Janissaries were indeed Albanians. Legend holds that the tekke (teqe in Albanian) of Sersem Ali Baba in Tetova of today's North Macedonia was founded in the mid 16th century, which would make it the oldest teqe in Albanian-speaking territory. Bektashism spread to Albania slowly, especially considering the language barriers Persian and Turkish missionaries faced; Bektashi missionaries were sent to Albania from the Bektashi centre at Dimetoka, usually in groups of three. The first missionaries arrived during the 14th and 15th centuries.

During Evliya Çelebi's travels in the southern Balkans in the second half of the 17th century, the presence of Bektashi teqes in Mitrovica and Kaçanik in Kosovo during 1660 was noted. Additionally, during Çelebi's tour of southern Albania in the summer of 1670, he also noted the presence of Bektashi teqes in Kaninë and Vlora. The construction of the Teqeja e Zallit (gravel teqe) in 1780 under Asim Baba laid the foundations for the growth of the Bektashi Order within Albania, and it was followed by the construction of more teqes throughout Albania—especially during the period between 1790 and 1825, in which the Bektashi Order maintained a strong presence within Albanian-speaking territories. The expansion of Bektashism in south Albania is linked to the rule of Ali Pasha of Ioannina, who was affiliated with the order and promoted its expansion. Ali Pasha used Bektashi dervishes as spies and diplomatic agents; this led to Mustafa Pasha Bushatli of the Bushati family (who was ruler of the Pashalik of Scutari) refusing to admit Bektashi dervishes to his provinces as he was concerned that they were spies for Ali. He drove the Bektashi Order out of north Albania for this very reason.

Bektashism gradually became more deeply rooted in Albania during the 19th century. The Auspicious Event of 1826, which culminated in the destruction of the Janissary Corps by the Ottoman sultan Mahmud II, also affected the Bektashi Order due to their strong affiliation with the Janissaries. As in Anatolia, many Bektashi buildings in Albania were destroyed or burnt down, including the teqes. However, the Bektashis of Albania were not as suppressed as those in Anatolia, as the formal abolition of the Janissary Corps and the Bektashi Order by the Ottoman Empire was only effective in Istanbul and the other provinces of the empire that were directly under the central Ottoman administration's authority. The Bektashi Order in Albania had fully recovered by the second half of the 19th century. This would also be when Bektashism in Albania adopted Albanian nationalism as a major part of its doctrine, and when the religion would see increased popularity amongst Albanians. During the Albanian National Awakening, the majority of Albanian Muslims constantly expressed their firm desire to sever their links with the Ottoman Empire, and the heterodoxy and tendency to assimilate external elements enabled Bektashism to fully integrate nationalism into its doctrine. This made the Bektashi Order extraordinarily popular in Albania.

Bektashis contributed greatly to Albanian patriotic efforts during this time and were crucial in educating the mostly illiterate Albanian population in the Albanian language. Albanians were attracted to Bektashism for certain values—more particularly, its traditional tolerance and regard for other religions, and its tolerance and open-mindedness towards other practices and beliefs. Additionally, in contrast to Sunni Islam, which was more favourable towards the Ottoman Turks and promoted the Arabic script, Bektashism was more sympathetic for local concerns and favoured the use of a Latin script for the Albanian language. At the beginning of the 20th century, about 15% of Albania's population was Bektashi, and Bektashi teqes served as underground Albanian-language schools and Albanian-language book distributors. However, contrary to what many Bektashi intellectuals had hoped for, the sect did not become the Albanian national religion, especially due to the fact that the Order was disproportionately concentrated in the south of Albania. Around 70% of all Bektashi teqes were found south of Berat and only about 3% in the north.

=== Post-independence ===
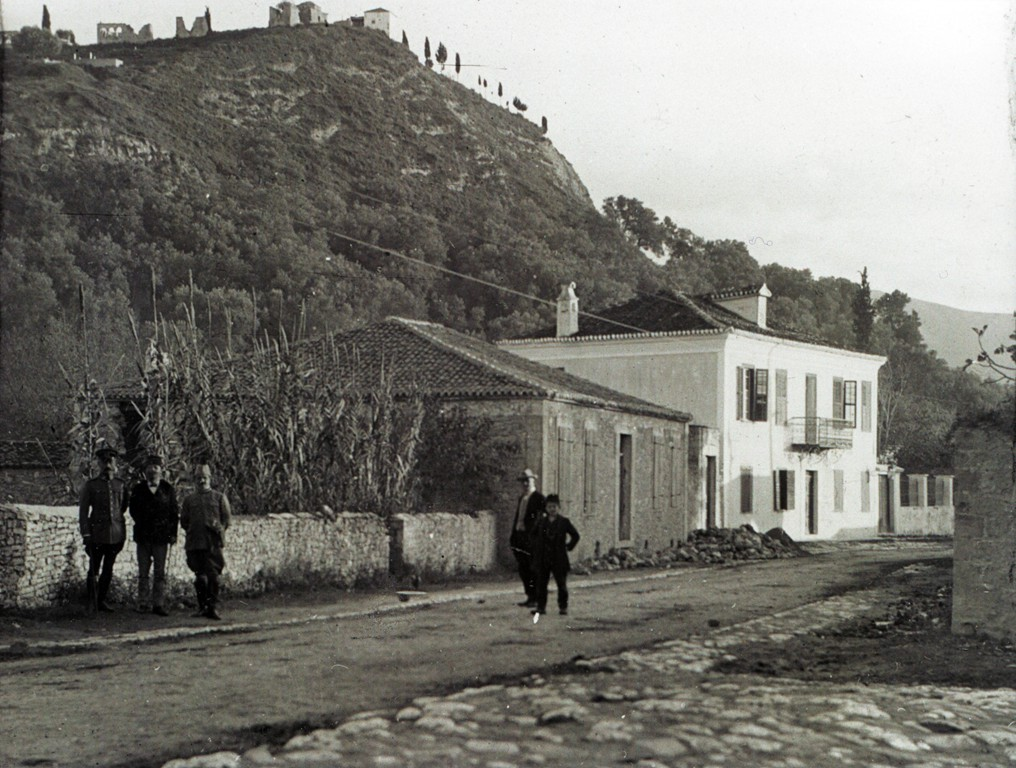
Road from the centre of Vlora to the port. On the hill are the ruins of the Bektashi teqe of Kuz Baba. 1913-1914

After the Albanian declaration of independence in 1912, the political instability that followed was harmful to the Albanian Bektashis. The teqes of Albania suffered significant damage and destruction throughout the Balkan Wars and the first two years of World War I. A period of destruction came with the Muslim Uprising of Albania, a Sunni Muslim revolt that was popular in central Albania and demanded that control of Albania was returned to the Ottomans, that the Albanian flag was replaced by the Ottoman one, and the use of Ottoman Turkish as the national language (or at least using Arabic script for Albanian) amongst several other demands. The rebels, led by the fanatic Haxhi Qamili, burnt down many Bektashi teqes from Martanesh in Bulqizë to as far south as Berat due to the strong links between Bektashism and Albanian nationalism (including the efforts Albanian Bektashis made towards the progression of Albanian education and Albanian independence) as well as the religious differences between the Shi'ite-oriented Bektashis and the Sunni Muslim rebels.

During the conflict between Albanians and Greeks in southern Albania during 1914–1915, where Greek forces took advantage of the political instability of Albania and attempted to annex as much Albanian territory into Greece as possible or succeed in creating the Autonomous Republic of Northern Epirus, at least 145 Albanian villages in southern Albania were looted and destroyed. Accompanying this was the destruction of 48 teqes at the hands of the Greek forces. In total, 80 per cent of the teqes in Albania were either extremely damaged or destroyed entirely during 1914–1915. The Bektashi Order of Albania has not fully recovered since this loss. With the conclusion of the First World War, stability returned to the surviving Albanian Bektashi community, and many teqes were rebuilt in the early 1920s.

By 1920, the Bektashi community in Albania had gained enough recognition to have one a representative - Aqif Pasha Biçaku - on the High Regency Council which governed Albania during the absence of Prince Wied; this council consisted of 4 representatives for each religious community. The Bektashi community of Albania stressed its separation from the Turkish Bektashi community during the First National Congress of the Bektashi (held at the teqe of Prishta in Skrapar and headed by Baba Ahmet Turani), where they stressed that they were the first religious community of Albania to be free of foreign control. At a 1923 Muslim conference held in Tirana, disputes arose between the Bektashis and the Sunnis, ultimately culminating in the Bektashi representatives leaving the meeting and breaking relations with the Grand Mufti in Istanbul.

The Second National Congress of the Bektashi was held on 8–9 July 1924, in Gjirokastër under Baba Ahmet Turani. The Turkish Bektashi community contemplated relocating their headquarters in Albania due to the political climate of Turkey, and thereby resolved that religious ceremonies could be performed in the Albanian language; all the dervish orders in Turkey were banned in 1925 by Mustafa Kemal Atatürk. The Third National Congress of the Bektashi was held in the teqe of Turan near Korça on 23 September 1929, this time under Baba Zylfo of Melçan, and it turned out to be the most crucial early Bektashi congress. The order declared itself to be a religious community of its own - autonomous from mainstream Islam - and they initiated the Kryegjysh system, with their Kryegjyshata in Tirana as their headquarters.

On the initiative of Salih Nijazi, an Albanian from the Kolonja region who was the Kryegjysh (dedebaba) of the Bektashi Order, the seat of the Order was transferred from Hacıbektaş in Anatolia to the new headquarters in the Albanian capital of Tirana. This was done in response to the Turkish ban on dervish orders and the closing of all the teqes in Anatolia. Estimations on the number of teqes in Albania at the time range from 43 to 65 in 1928 and 52 in 1933, whilst there were about a dozen teqes in Kosovo and several in the Albanian-speaking regions of North Macedonia. Until 1937, the Kryegjysh appointment was approved by King Zog. It is claimed by the Bektashis that Salih Nijazi was murdered in 1941 by the Italian fascist regime that was occupying Albania at the time, and that the cause of this murder was Nijazi's refusal to collaborate with the occupying forces.

=== Communist period ===
After World War II, the Albanian Partisans seized control of the nation and established a Stalinist regime. The Fourth National Congress of the Bektashi was held in Tirana on 5 May 1945, leading to a change of leadership. Xhafer Sadik was made Kryegjysh, and Baba Faja Martaneshi was made secretary general, but the death of Sadiku on 2 August 1945 led to an early replacement by Abaz Hilmi. On 19 March 1947, Abaz Hilmi Dede shot and killed both Baba Faja Martaneshi and Baba Fejzo Dervishi prior to committing suicide after a heated argument over religious matters occurred. It is believed that Martaneshi and Dervishi, who were loyal towards the Communist regime, demanded the order to collaborate more closely with the Communists and accused Hilmi of being a reactionary.

The Communist dictatorship established complete control over the Bektashi Order through purges and by frightening the babas into submission or silence; this was soon followed with the death of many of the Bektashi leaders, such as Baba Qamil Gllava of Tepelena (executed in Gjirokastra, 1946), Baba Ali Myrteza of Kruja (tortured and then thrown out of a prison window), Baba Ali Tomorri and Baba Shefket Koshtani of Tepelena (executed). Ahmet Myftar, a loyal follower of Communist doctrines, assumed the Kryegjyshata on 8 June 1947, and was a puppet of the Communist regime.

The Fifth National Congress of the Bektashi was held in Tirana on 16 April 1950, and in 1954, there were still between 43 and 68 teqes in the country. In 1967, the new Albanian Constitution banned religion, which resulted in a militant political campaign against religious institutions and groups; young people were encouraged to attack mosques, teqes and churches, and to denounce members of the clergy to communist authorities, resulting in the disbandment of the Bektashi community. Most teqes and tyrbes - along with churches and mosques - were razed to the ground, and their leaders were sent into internal exile or imprisoned. Of the 53 Bektashi teqes that existed prior to this, only 6 remained. The Bektashi community in Albania was eradicated, but two teqes continued to function outside of Albania - one in Gjakova, Kosovo, under Baba Qazim Bakalli, and one in Taylor, Detroit in Michigan, United States, founded by Baba Rexheb in 1954. The teqe of Gjakova was later burnt down by Serbian forces in 1999 along with the rest of the old town of Gjakova during the Kosovo War. In 1993, after the fall of Communism in Albania, one dervish and 5 babas were all that remained in the country, with only 6 remaining teqes.

=== Present ===
A provisional committee for the revival of the Bektashi Order was founded in Tirana on 27 January 1991. The new community, under Baba Reshat Bardhi, has since worked to revive the Order, and the Kryegjyshata of Tirana was reopened on 22 March 1991, during Novruz. This reopening was attended by other religious figures in Albania, such as Mother Teresa, and a Sixth National Congress of the Bektashi occurred on 19–20 July 1993. A Seventh National Congress of the Bektashi occurred on the 23–24 September 2000, and an Eight on 21 September 2005. A Ninth congress was held on 6 July 2009. Rebuilding was difficult for the Bektashi, who lacked a foreign patron to provide funding for their revival, with the exception of modest donations from the American-Albanian Bektashi community. However, the Bektashi Order managed to legally have much of their extensive previous property returned, and through methods such as leasing out their pasture lands, the Bektashi community lives in good part.

== Bektashism and Albanian nationalism ==
During the 19th and 20th centuries, Albanian Bektashism incorporated Albanian nationalism as a central element of its doctrine. After the Auspicious Event and the persecution of the Bektashi Order throughout the Ottoman Empire, Bektashism emerged amongst Albanians with nationalism and anti-Ottoman sentiment - the order's historical conflict with the Ottoman authorities contributed to their nationalist, anti-Turk stance, which went hand-in-hand with the liberation heterodoxy that predominated in Albanian Bektashi philosophy. It is this same heterodoxy and ability to assimilate external influences that enabled the order to fully integrate Albanian nationalist doctrine within its system, which made it extremely popular in Albania.

Nationalist sentiment amongst Albanian Bektashis began to blossom within the second half of the 19th century in particular - Bektashi clergy, stemming from both peasantry and wealthier social classes, were very active in Albanian national movements. They would spread nationalist ideas and hold national and local meetings for like-minded patriotic groups and individuals within their teqes. The influence of the Bektashi in this regard also extended to the local Albanian Orthodox population. In particular, the Bektashi clergy were crucial to the teaching of the Albanian language and the distribution of Albanian books and made enormous progress in this aspect. Bektashi teqes became a network of underground Albanian-language schools that would distribute books, spellers and newspapers to the local Albanian population during a time when education in the Albanian language was discouraged/minimised or outright banned by the Ottoman authorities. Teqes outside of Albania, such as the teqe in Cairo, supported these efforts by sending Albanian dervishes to distribute Albanian books throughout Albanian-inhabited territories.

Naim Frashëri, who was one of the most prominent Albanian poets, writers and activists of the Rilindja period, was strongly affiliated with the Albanian Bektashis. In his text - Fletore e bektashinjët (The Bektashi Notebook; 1896) - Frashëri explained and to an extent founded the novel theological and practical principles of Bektashism and the organisational rules surrounding its functioning. Frashëri's text is devoid of religious fanaticism, mystification and dogmatism, and it insists on ethics and moral principles. Under Frashëri's intellectual influence, the development of Albanian Bektashism showed that esoteric knowledge was not exclusive to a particular genealogical lineage more so than any other Sufi order, but instead acquired via spiritual progression that was closely related to the expression of Albanian national sentiments and the implementation of patriotism as the highest of virtues.

The Atës, or Babas, were significant contributors to the Albanian National Awakening, culminating in some of them being imprisoned or suffering more severe punishments for their efforts. Although they were part of the Muslim community and had contributed to the advancement of Albanian literature in Arabic script, the Albanian Bektashis supported and promoted the use of the Latin script for the Albanian alphabet. Efforts by the Young Turks to send imams and dervishes to promote the use of the Arabic script by winning over the Bektashi clergy were thwarted and ignored. The Bektashi clergy created and operated several 'clubs' and patriotic societies in 20th century Albania, and their primary goal was to promote teaching in the Albanian language and to distribute Albanian literature. In southern Albania, the Bektashi strongly supported armed çeta groups and their anti-Ottoman activities; the Bektashi teqes were usually in isolated areas out of the reach of Turkish authorities, hence they could support these groups and practically act as the headquarters of Albanian nationalist movements. Teqes would also be the point of communication between çetas and the supporting civilian population. Many instances exist where an Atë and his teqe have furthered the Albanian national cause by spreading awareness about it, educating Albanian populations or supporting and harbouring çeta groups.

== Leadership ==
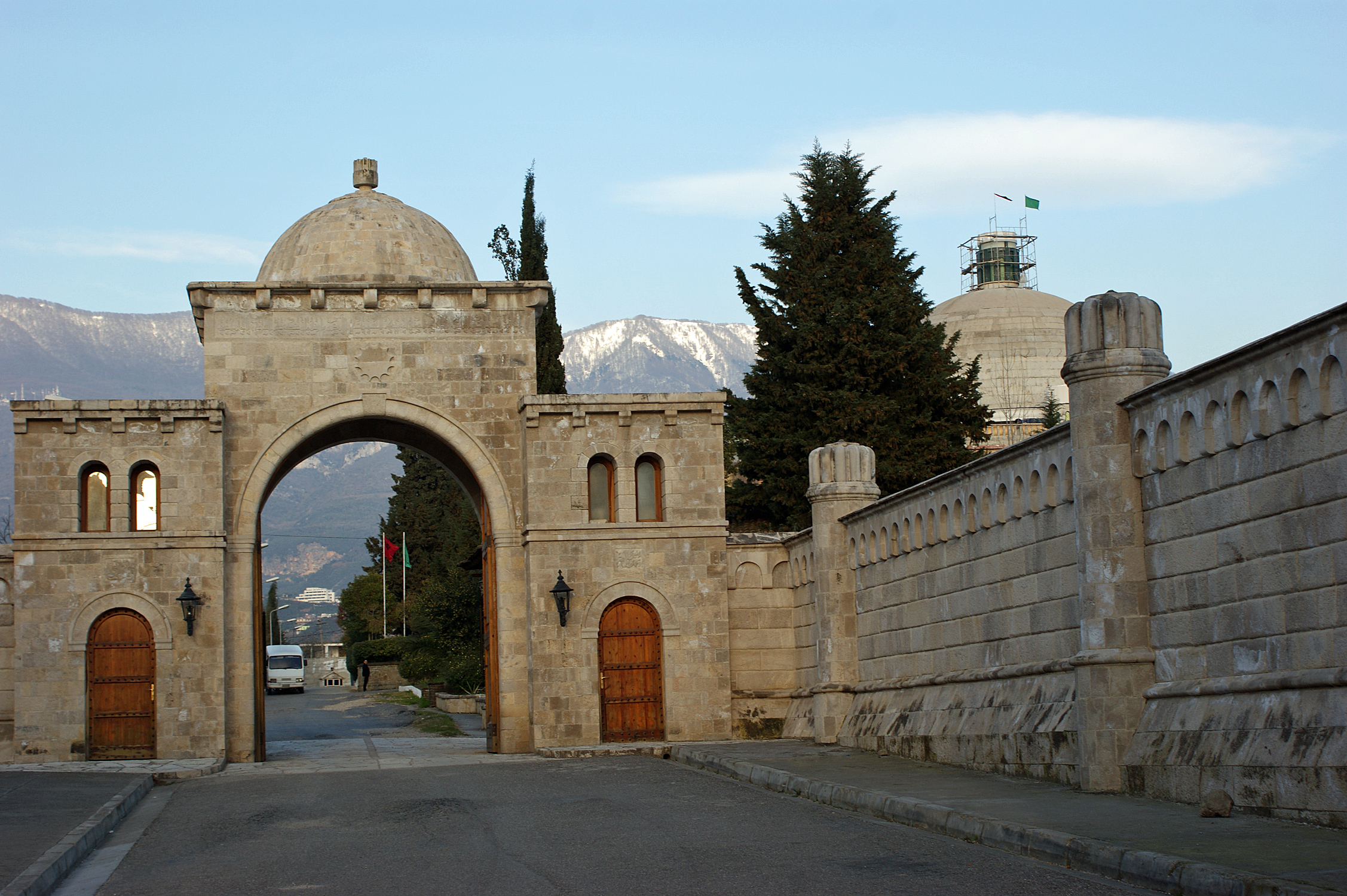
The Centre of the Bektashi Order in Tirana, Albania

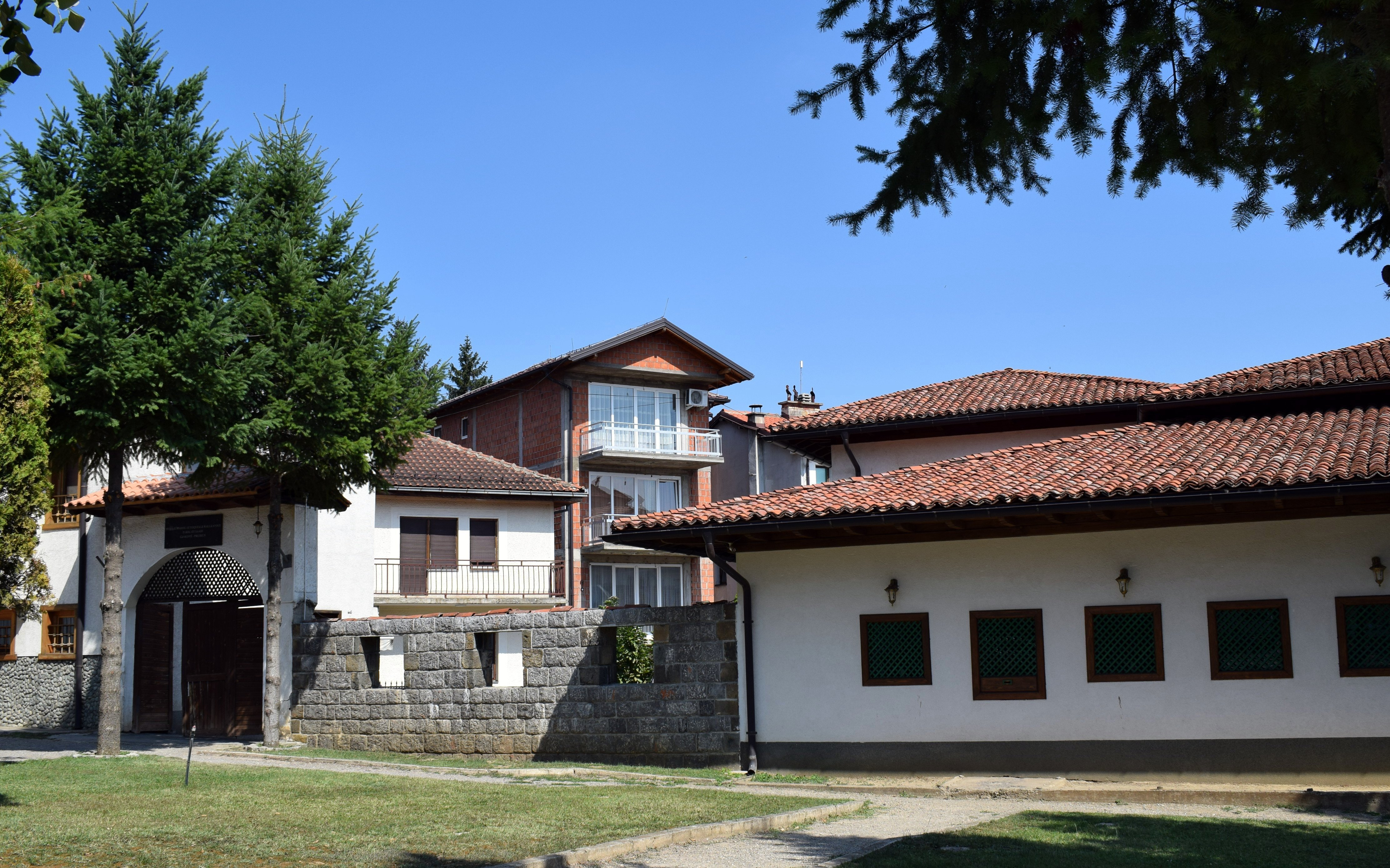
Teqja e Madhe, Gjakova

The Bektashi Order is headed by a Kryegjysh (otherwise known as dedebaba elsewhere). The current Kryegjysh is Baba Mondi. In Albania, the World Headquarters of the Bektashi (Albanian: Kryegjyshata) divides the country into 6 different administrative districts (similar to Christian parishes and patriarchates), each of which is called a gjyshata.

- The Gjyshata of Gjirokastra (headquarters: tekke of Asim Bab): the regions of Gjirokastra, Saranda and Tepelena.
- The Gjyshata of Korça (headquarters: tekke of Turan): the regions of Korça, Devoll, Pogradec and Kolonja, including Leskovik.
- The Gjyshata of Kruja (headquarters: tekke of Fushë Kruj): the regions of Kruja, Kurbin, Bulqiza, Dibra, Mat, Shkodra and Durrës.
- The Gjyshata of Elbasan (headquarters: tekke of Baba Xhefai): the regions of Elbasan, Gramsh, Peqin, Lushnja, Kavaja, and Librazhd, including Përrenjas.
- The Gjyshata of Vlora (headquarters: tekke of Kusum Bab): the regions of Vlora, Mallakastra, Fier, including Patos and Roskovec.
- The Gjyshata of Berat (headquarters: tekke of Prisht): the regions of Berat, Skrapar and Përmet.

The Albanian Bektashi Order in Kosovo is centred around Gjakova and is currently under the leadership of Baba Mumin Lama. They recognise the Albanian leadership in Tirana as the heads of their order.

=== List of Kryegjysha (Dedebabas) ===
1. Salih Nijazi (from 1930 to 1941)
2. Ali Riza Dede (from 1942 to 1944)
3. Kamber Ali (from 1944 to 1945)
4. Xhafer Sadik (from 1945 to 1945)
5. Abaz Hilmi (from 1945 to 1947)
6. Ahmet Myftar (from 1947 to 1958)
7. Baba Reshat (from 1991 to 2011)
8. Baba Mondi (from 2011–present)

== Structure ==
The Bektashi Order in Albania has a hierarchal structure:

- The ashik (from Turkish aşık, literally 'lover') is a Bektashi follower who has not yet been initiated.
- The muhib (meaning 'one who loves, sympathiser') is an initiate of the Bektashi community - one who has been initiated through a ritual purification or profession of faith during a ceremony at a teqe.
- The varfa (from Albanian i varfur, meaning 'poor'), or poor dervishes, are the Bektashi equivalent of Christian monks. An initiate may become a varfa after a trial period of 1001 days and receives a white headdress called the taxh, usually living permanently at a teqe. Varfa cannot be removed from their oath as a poor dervish. Varfa must be wise, gentle, modest, submissive and a servant of mankind. Should someone curse or strike the varfa, the varfa must not react. If a varfa was married prior to becoming a poor dervish, he may stay at home with his family. Every varfa has a job or carries out a service of his own.
- Varfa can also vow never to marry, in which case they become a Myxher (from Turkish mücerred, meaning 'person tried by experience, pure, unmarried'), or celibate dervishes. Myxher wear a ring in their right ear.
- The Atë (literally meaning 'father' in Albanian) - or baba - is a spiritual leader, the equivalent of a sheikh in other Dervish orders. Each teqe is normally headed by an Atë. The Atë is the chief of the dervishes, and is also known as the udhërrëfenjës (meaning 'guide' in Albanian).
- The Gjysh (literally meaning 'grandfather' in Albanian), is the superior of the babas - when there are several Atë's, they choose one among them to serve as the Gjysh. The Gjysh has passed through the final ceremony, and is responsible for the teqe's of a certain region. For a poor dervish to become an Atë, he must be initiated by the Gjysh.
- The Kryegjysh, or Stërgjysh (literally meaning 'Head-Grandfather' and 'Great-Grandfather' respectively), known in Turkish as dede baba, is the leader of the Bektashi Order and is chosen amongst the Gjyshes by the Gjyshes themselves.

== List of Teqes and Shrines ==
=== District of Bulqiza ===
- Teqe of Bulqiza, Bulqizë
- Teqe of Balim Sultan, Martanesh
- Teqe of Haxhi Hysen Baba, Martanesh
- Tyrbe of Baba Hysen, Zërqan

=== District of Berat ===
- Teqe of Baba Iljaz, Osmënzeza
- Teqe of Baba Muharrem, Plashnik
- Teqe of Kulmak (or Teqe of Mount Tomorr or Tyrbe of Abbas Ali), Mount Tomorr
- Teqe of Baba Kamber, Velabisht
- Teqe of Baba Tahir, Vokopola

=== District of Delvina ===
- Dervishia of Beqir Efendi, Delvinë

=== District of Devoll Municipali ===
- Teqe of Baba Kasem, Kuç

=== District of Dibra ===
- Teqe of Bllaca, Bllaca

=== District of Elbasan ===
- Teqe of Ibrahim Xhefai Baba (or Teqe of Fakri Mustafai Baba or Teqe of Krasta), Elbasan
- Teqe of Baba Ali Horasani (or Teqe of Baba Xhemali), Elbasan
- Teqe of Baba Hamit (or Teqe of Baba Ali Riza), Elbasan

=== District of Fier ===
- Teqe of Cakran, Cakran
- Teqe of Baba Ali Horasani, Mbyet

=== District of Gjirokastra ===
- Teqe of Asim Baba, Gjirokastër
- Hajdërije Teqe (or Teqe of Shtuf or Teqe of Baba Sulejman), Gjirokastër
- Teqe of Baba Zejnel (or Teqe of Zejnel Abedin Baba), Gjirokastër
- Teqe of Baba Ali (or Teqe of Melan), Melan
- Dervishia of Baba Hasan, Picar

=== District of Gramsh, Elbasan ===
- Teqe of Baba Ahmet, Dushk
- Teqe of Baba Mustafa, Shëmbërdhenj

=== District of Kavaja ===
- Teqe of Baba Sako, Luz i Madh

=== District of Kolonja ===
- Teqe of Baba Hasan (or Teqe of Baba Selim), Kreshova
- Teqe of Haxhi Baba Horasani, Qesaraka
- Teqe of Baba Sulejman, Sanjollas
- Teqe of Baba Husejn (or Baruç Teqe), Starja

=== District of Korça ===
- Teqe of Mazreka, Mazreka
- Teqe of Baba Hysen (or Teqe of Baba Abdullah Melçani), Melçan
- Tyrbe of Plasa, Plasa
- Teqe of Baba Ismail, Polena
- Tyrbe of Pulaha, Pulaha
- Teqe of Beqir Efendi, Qatrom
- Teqe of Baba Salih Elbasani, Turan
- Teqe of Vloçisht, Vloçisht
- Teqe of Vrëpska, Vrëpska

=== District of Kruja ===
- Teqe of Shemimi Baba, Fushë Kruja
- Teqe of Baba Hamza (or Teqe of Haxhi Hamza), Krujë
- Teqe of Haxhi Jahja Baba, Krujë
- Tyrbe of Mustafa Dollma, Krujë
- Tyrbe of Zemzi Baba, Krujë
- Tyrbe of Sari Saltik, Mount Kruja

=== District of Kurbin ===
- Teqe of Hajdar Baba, Gjonëm
- Teqe of Baba Isak, Shullaz

=== District of Lushnja ===
- Tyrbe of Baba Skënder, Lushnja

=== District of Mallakastra ===
- Dervishia of Aranitas, Aranitas
- Dervishia of Çorrush, Çorrush
- Teqe of Baba Xhelal, Drizar
- Dervishia of Fratar, Fratar
- Teqe of Baba Husejn, Greshica
- Teqe of Hekal, Hekal
- Teqe of Baba Ismail, Kapaj
- Teqe of Baba Hasan, Kremenar
- Teqe of Baba Rifat, Kuta
- Teqe of Ngrançija (or Teqe of Nuri Baba), Ngrançija

=== District of Përmet ===
- Teqe of Baba Ali, Alipostivan
- Teqe of Baba Jemin (or Teqe of Baba Dalip), Bubës i Parë
- Teqe of Bubës (or Teqe of Baba Ali), Bubës i Sipërm
- Teqe of Baba Tahir Nasibi, Frashër
- Teqe of Baba Husejn, Gumen
- Teqe of Hasan Dede, Këlcyra
- Dervishia of Kosina, Kosina
- Teqe of Kostrec, Kostrec
- Teqe of Baba Abedin, Leskovik
- Teqe of Pacomit, Pacomit
- Teqe of Baba Bektash (or Teqe of Baba Xhafer), Përmet
- Teqe of Baba Ali, Përmet
- Teqe of Petran, Petran
- Teqe of Podgoran, Podgoran
- Tyrbe of Rodenj, Rodenj
- Teqe of Baba Tahir (Përmet) (or Teqe of Suka), Suka
- Tyrbe of Zhepova, Zhepova

=== District of Saranda ===
- Bektashi Mekam Of Baba Hasani, Borsh
- Teqe of Dede Reshat Bardhi, Saranda

=== District of Shkodra ===
- Tyrbe of Baba Kamber, Drisht

=== District of Skrapar ===
- Teqe of Baba Fetah, Backa
- Teqe of Baba Xhafer, Brerima
- Teqe of Çerrica, Çerrica
- Teqe of Kuç, Kuç
- Teqe of Lavdar, Lavdar
- Teqe of Baba Tahir, Prishta
- Teqe of Baba Meleq, Straficka
- Teqe of Baba Behlul, Therepel

=== District of Tepelena ===
- Dervishia of Bënça, Bënça
- Teqe of Dukaj, Dukaj
- Teqe of Ismail Baba, Gllava
- Teqe of Baba Kamber, Kiçok
- Teqe of Baba Islam, Komar
- Teqe of Baba Sadik, Koshtan
- Teqe of Baba Husejn (or Teqe of Harakop), Krahës
- Teqe of Baba Musa, Maricaj
- Teqe of Baba Salih, Matohasanaj
- Teqe of Memaliaj (or Tyrbe of Baba Hasan), Memaliaj
- Teqe of Progonat, Progonat
- Tyrbe of Qesarat, Qesarat
- Teqe of Baba Selman, Rabija
- Dervishia of Rozeç, Rozeç
- Teqe of Demir Han, Tepelena
- Teqe of Baba Ali (or Teqe of Turan), Turan
- Teqe of Baba Ali (or Teqe of Veliqot), Veliqot

=== District of Tirana ===
- Kryegjyshata, Tirana

=== District of Vlora ===
- Teqe of Gjorm, Gjorm
- Teqe of Haxhi Baba Mehmet Aliu, Golimbas
- Teqe of Gorisht, Gorisht
- Teqe of Sinan Pasha (or Teqe of Kanina), Kaninë
- Teqe of Shkoza, Shkoza
- Teqe of Smokthina, Smokthina
- Teqe of Kusum Baba (or Mekam of Kusum Baba), Vlorë

=== Kosovo ===
- Teqe of Shemseddin Baba, Gjakova
- Teqe of Baba Adem, Prizren

=== North Macedonia ===
- Teqe of Hidër Baba, Kërçova
- Teqe of Harabati Baba, Tetova

=== Greece ===
- Teqe of Durballi Sultan, Farsala
- Teqe of Ali Dede Horasani (or Teqe of Candia or Teqe of Rrisk Baba), Heraklion
- Teqe of Abdullah Baba, Katerini
- Teqe of Hysejn Baba, Konica

=== United States ===
- First Albanian Bektashi Tekke in America, Taylor, Michigan

== Notable figures ==
- Ali Pasha of Ioannina, Albanian ruler of the Pashalik of Janina
- Baba Shemin, Albanian Bektashi martyr and bejtexhi
- Nasibi Tahir Babai, Albanian Bektashi wali and bejtexhi
- Naim Frashëri, Albanian poet, writer and activist involved in the Albanian National Awakening
- Abdyl Frashëri, Albanian statesman, diplomat and activist involved in the Albanian National Awakening
- Sami Frashëri, Albanian literary figure and activist involved in the Albanian National Awakening
- Baba Faja Martaneshi, Albanian Bektashi baba and resistance leader
- Ali Tomorri, Albanian Bektashi religious leader

== Sources ==
- Rexhepi, Piro (2020). "Bektashism as a model and metaphor for 'Balkan Islam'". In Scharbrodt, Oliver; Shanneik, Yafa (eds.). Shi'a Minorities in the Contemporary World. Edinburgh University Press. ISBN 9781474430371. JSTOR 10.3366/j.ctv1453j6b.
