= List of tekkes in Albania =

This is a list of the main tekkes in Albania. The tekkes belong to various Sufi orders, including the Bektashi and Rüfai Orders.

== Tekkes ==
The Albanian Communist regime destroyed 530 tekkes, tombs and mausoleums.

Sufi tekkes
#	Name	Location	Year	Builder	Image
1	Halveti Tekke; Teqeja e Helvetive	Berat	1782	Ahmet Kurt Pasha	
2	Dollma Tekke; Teqeja e Dollmës	Krujë	1789	Dollma Family	
3	Frashër Tekke; Teqeja e Frashërit	Përmet	1815	Nasibi Tahir Babai	
4	Martanesh Tekke; Teqeja e Martaneshit	Bulqizë	1779	Adem Aga Toptani	
5	Backë Tekke; Teqeja e Backës	Skrapar	1870	Builders were from Gostivisht and Kolonjë.	
6	Melan Tekke; Teqeja e Melanit	Libohovë	1800	Baba Aliu	
7	Qesarakë Tekke; Teqeja e Qesarakës	Ersekë	1620	Haxhi Baba Horosani	
8	Turan Tekke; Teqeja e Turanit	Korçë	1827		
9	Zall Tekke; Teqeja e Zallit	Gjirokastër	1780	Sejid Asim Babai	
10	Kapaj Tekke; Teqeja e Kapajt	Mallakastër	1901	Baba Selmani	

== See also ==
- List of Bektashi tekkes and shrines
- List of Religious Cultural Monuments of Albania
- Islam in Albania
- Bektashi Order
