= Tekija =

Tekija can refer to:

- Tekija (building), a type of Islamic religious building also known as tekke or tekye
- Tekija, Ilinden, a village in North Macedonia
- Tekija (Kladovo), a village in Serbia on the Danube
- Tekija (Kruševac), a village in Serbia near Kruševac
- Tekija (Paraćin), a village in Serbia
