= Teqe of Bulqiza =

Tekke of Bulqiza
- Teqeja e Bulqizës (Albanian)
- Location: Bulqizë

History
- Founder: Baba Fejzë Bulqiza
- Built: 1780

The Teqe of Bulqiza or Tekke of Bulqiza (Albanian: Teqeja e Bulqizës) is a Bektashi tekke in the town of Bulqiza. It was founded in the nineteenth century by Baba Fejzë Bulqiza, an important Albanian Bektashi figure in the local Dibra region who opened schools in the surrounding area after returning to Albania in 1827 upon the completion of his religious training in Anatolia. The tekke was first destroyed in 1860, and Baba Fejzë Bulqiza is said to have been killed at this point in time as well, but he has no known grave. A new tekke was raised in his honour around 1900, and thereafter closed in 1967 during the Communist period due to the Albanian communist party's crackdown on religion. After the fall of the communist regime, the Teqe of Bulqiza was reopened as a tyrbe in 1994.
