= Teqe of Bllaca =

Tekke of Bllaca
- Teqeja e Bllacës (Albanian)
- Location: Bllaca, Dibra

History
- Founder: Baba Isuf
- Built: 1893

The Teqe of Baba Isuf (Albanian: Teqeja e Baba Isufit) or Teqe of Bllaca (Albanian: Teqeja e Bllacës) is a Bektashi tekke in the village of Bllacë, Dibër. It was founded in the late nineteenth century by Baba Isuf (also known as Baba Jusuf or Baba Sufa). The tekke has historically been an important centre of learning, known for its patriotic contributions in educating people in the Albanian language during late 19th and early 20th centuries. The tekke's feast day is the 10th of June.

== History ==
Baba Sufa, who hailed from the Albanian Tasha family of Bllacë, was connected with a tekke in Tetova along with his father, Fejza Bulqiza. He opened the first meytep (elementary religious school) in Bllacë during the mid-1830's, but due to the 1826 Ottoman ban on the Bektashi Order, it was soon destroyed, and was not rebuilt until Baba Sufa's son, Baba Isuf (also called Baba Sufa or Baba Jusuf), founded the teqe in 1893.

The tekke was notorious for educating people in the Albanian alphabet during this period, teaching local Albanians how to read and write in their native language, and distributing books that came from Manastir. Under Baba Isuf, regular meetings were held promoting the liberation and independence of Albania from the Ottoman Empire, and participants were delegated certain tasks to further this cause as well as to further education in the Albanian language via book distribution. In particular, the works of Naim Frashëri were distributed from this tekke. Baba Isuf was crucial in teaching the Albanian language in the Dibra region and strongly contributed to the Albanian National Awakening, even opening up an Albanian school in 1908. He was persecuted by Ottoman and Serbian authorities for his efforts, and died in 1915.

Jashar Zeneli, an important figure of the tekke during this period, invited the kaymakam of Dibra to visit and gifted him a traditional Dibran Albanian costume. The kaymakam was won over and permitted the tekke to continue teaching in Albanian so long as other Ottoman authorities did not find out. Upon the arrival of Turgut Pasha and his army in 1910, the ban on the teaching of Albanian was enforced yet again. After the declaration of independence of Albania was declared in 1912, Albanians were openly educated in their native tongue, with members of the tekke of Bllaca such as Seit Tasha becoming prominent local educating figures. The tekke was destroyed during the First World War and was reconstructed in the early 1920's by Baba Isuf's successor, Baba Rushit Tollja of Strikçan, who was also appointed to the Teqe of Martanesh in 1924. Baba Rushit served both tekkes simultaneously but preferred to reside in Bllaca. Later in the 1920's, the tekke was administered by Sejdi Baba.

The tekke was yet again destroyed in 1967 during the Communist period of Albania under the atheist dictatorship of Enver Hoxha and reopened in 1995 under Baba Ismail Jangulli. It is now under Baba Halil Curri.

== List of leaders ==
1. Baba Isuf (founder, 1893)
2. Baba Rushit Tollja (1920's)
3. Sejdi Baba (1920's)
4. Baba Zejnel of Skrapari (1930)
5. Baba Ahmet (1938)
6. Baba Muharrem Metalla (1950-1954)
7. Baba Xhemal Rapush Dinollari (1954-1963)
8. Baba Ismail Jangulli (1995)
9. Baba Halil Curri (present)
