= Ali Riza Dede =

Dedebaba of the Bektashians from 1942 to 1944

Dede Ali Riza
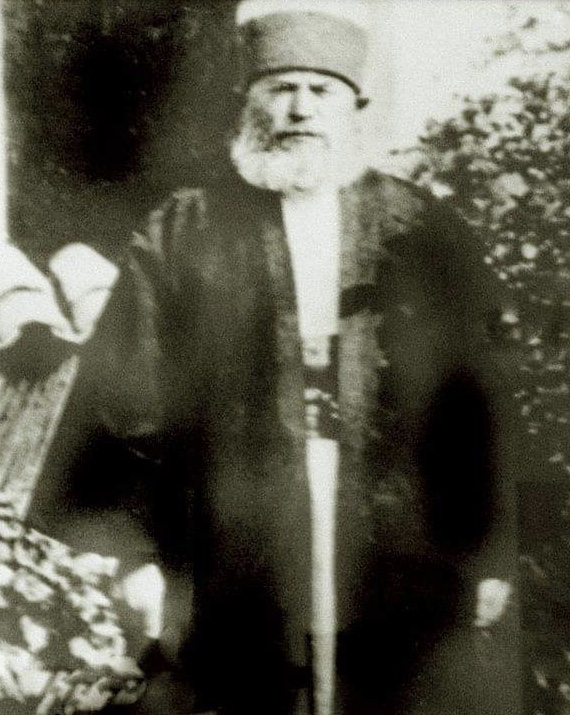
- 1942 photograph of Ali Riza Dede

2nd Bektashi Dedebaba
- In office 6 January 1942 – 22 February 1944
- Preceded by: Sali Njazi
- Succeeded by: Kamber Ali

Personal life
- Born: 18 October 1882 Akçahisar, Ottoman Empire (today Krujë, Albania)
- Died: 22 February 1944 (aged 61) Albania

Religious life
- Religion: Islam
- Order: Bektashi Order

Ali Riza of Elbasan or Ali Riza Dede (1882–1944) was the 2nd Dedebaba of the Bektashi Order.

== Biography ==
Ali Riza was born in Krujë, Albania, which was then in the Ottoman Empire; hence, he is sometimes also known as Ali Riza of Kruja. His date of birth is uncertain, and could be either 1876 or 1882.

For 10 years, Ali Riza served at the tekke in Fushë Krujë, after which he served as a dervish in Martanesh. Baba Ahmet Turani then appointed him as the baba of Baba Hamit Tekke in Elbasan. He was the baba of the tekke from November 1921 to December 1941.

After the death of Salih Nijazi Dedebaba, Ali Riza succeeded him as Dedebaba. Although initially reluctant to serve as Dedebaba because he felt that he did not have enough knowledge, he continued to serve in that role until his death on 22 February 1944.

Preceded by Sali Njazi	Dedebaba; 6 January 1942 - 22 February 1944	Succeeded by Kamber Ali
