= Teqe of Baba Ali =

Historic site in Alipostivan, Albania

Tekke of Baba Ali
- Teqeja e Baba Aliut (Albanian)
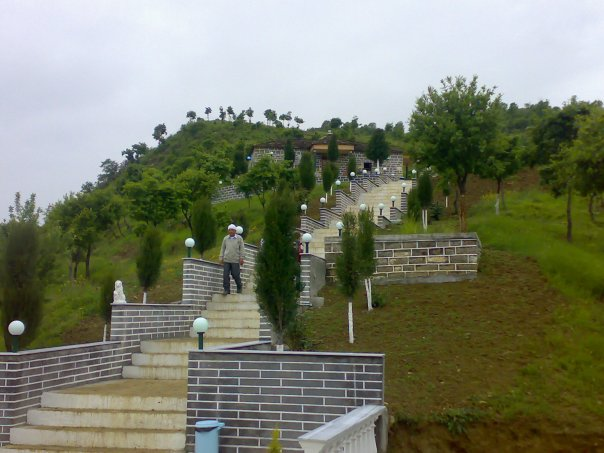
- Staircase at the teqe
- Location: Alipostivan, Qendër Piskovë, Albania

History
- Built: 1767, rebuilt in 1857/1860 and again in 1903

Site notes
- Architect(s): Baba Ali (1857/1860), Baba Abdullah (1903)

The Teqe of Baba Ali (Albanian: Teqeja e Baba Aliut), or Teqe of Baba Abdullah, is a Bektashi tekke in the village of Alipostivan, Qendër Piskovë, Përmet municipality, Albania. It sits upon a hill overlooking the Vjosa valley and the Nemërçka mountain, and the name of Alipostivan itself is said to derive from Ali, post i vendit ("Ali, sheepskin-sitter of the place"). The tekke of Baba Ali is known for the preservation and development of Bektashi traditions, particularly in spreading Bektashism to the Deshnica area and along the border villages of Skrapar. Historically, it has cooperated closely with the tekke in Frashër.

== History ==
The tekke is said to have been founded initially around 1767, but the site may possibly be older due to the presence of ancient ruins, which most probably sat upon an old trade route from Skrapar to Përmet. The tekke was re-founded by Baba Ali in 1857 or 1860. It was again re-founded in 1903 by Baba Abdullah, who was originally from the tekke of Konica and whose tomb is located within the tekke. Baba Abdullah and Baba Dule Përmeti were supporters and participants of the Albanian National Awakening, particularly in regards to the Albanian language during 1908–1909. Greek andartes burnt down the tekke in 1914, but it was rebuilt in 1920. On 14th–17 January 1921, the tekke was represented by Baba Meleq at the First National Congress of the Bektashi. In 1923, it was visited by Margaret Hasluck, who encountered one baba and three dervishes. It was closed in 1967 during the Communist period, due to the Albanian communist party's crackdown on religion, and torn down by the surrounding villagers. Reconstruction began in 1997, and the tekke reopened in May 2003.

== Pilgrimage ==
In the past and the present, the tekke of Alipostivan has been an important site of pilgrimage for the Albanian Bektashis, due to the fact that Abdullah Baba —considered by many in the region to be a Bektashi saint —was buried and is still venerated here. Many men in the region still bear the first name Abdullah. The Bektashi villagers of Kosinë gather at the tekke of Alipostivan for prayer, particularly on the feast of Novruz.
