= Haji Bektash Veli Complex =

Cultural monument in Nevşehir Province, Turkey

- Hacı Bektaş Veli Külliyesi
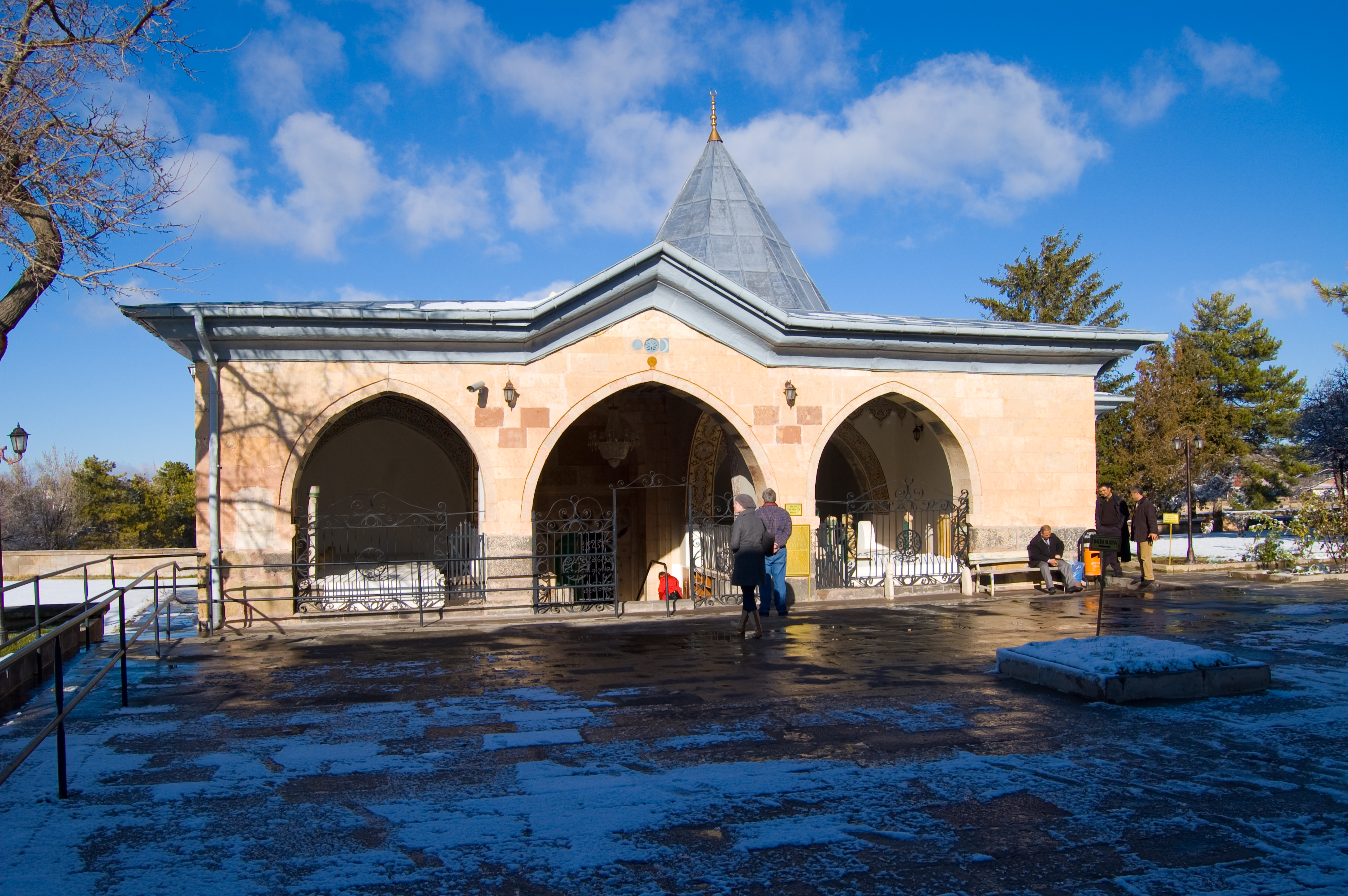

- Location within Turkey
- 38°56′N 34°33′E
- Type: Religious complex
- Periods: Seljuks of Anatolia
- Location: Hacıbektaş, Nevşehir Province, Turkey

The Haji Bektash Veli Complex (Turkish: Hacıbektaş Külliyesi) is a Turkish Alevi religious site located in Hacıbektaş, Nevşehir province, central Anatolia. It was built in the 13th century as a teqe (dergâh) of the Sufi saint Haji Bektash Veli. After his death, his mausoleum was built here.

Before the secularization of Turkey in 1925, the complex was home to the pir evi ("pir's house") of Haji Bektash Veli, which served as the international headquarters of the Bektashi Order. In 1910, the later dedebaba Ali Kamber Prishta, Ahmet Turani, and Sulejman of Gjirokastra were each appointed as gjysh (baba) by Fejzi Dede here. The third kryegjysh Sali Njazi Dede received his education at this pir evi.

A portion of the 1982 unauthorized Turkish Star Wars adaptation Dünyayı Kurtaran Adam ("Turkish Star Wars") — a film well-known among cinephiles — was shot at the Hajibektash Complex; the Turkish "Obi-Wan Kenobi" appears there as the mosque's imam and delivers a speech to the actor Cüneyt Arkın (who plays the character Murat).

== Secularization ==
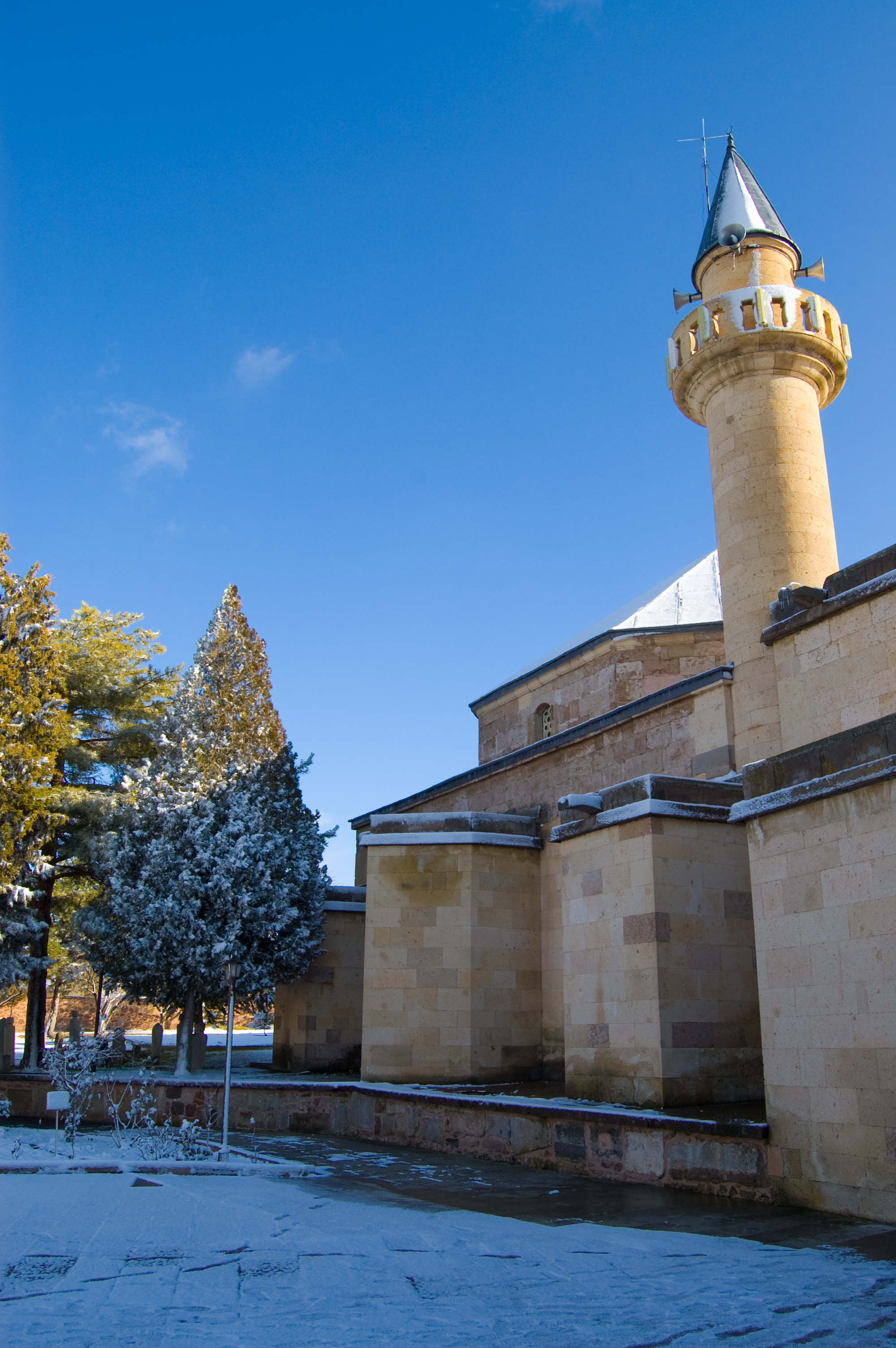
Outside the Hajibektash Complex

Mustafa Kemal Atatürk's 1925 ban on all dervish orders caused the exodus of the Bektashi Order to Albania in 1925, and the complex was closed for religious use. As a result, the administrative seat of the Bektashi Order was shifted to the World Headquarters of the Bektashi in Tirana, Albania in 1930. The Haji Bektash Veli complex was later declared as museum in 1964. The teqe of the complex is thought to be the first "King type" teqe in Turkey.

In August of 1993 Dede Reshat Bardhi visited the tekke museum, where thousands of believers from the Asian parts of Turkey, Azerbaijan, Turkestan, and the Middle East came to greet him. The mayor of the town of Hacıbektaş received Dede Reshat with a special lunch of honor.

== Tourism ==
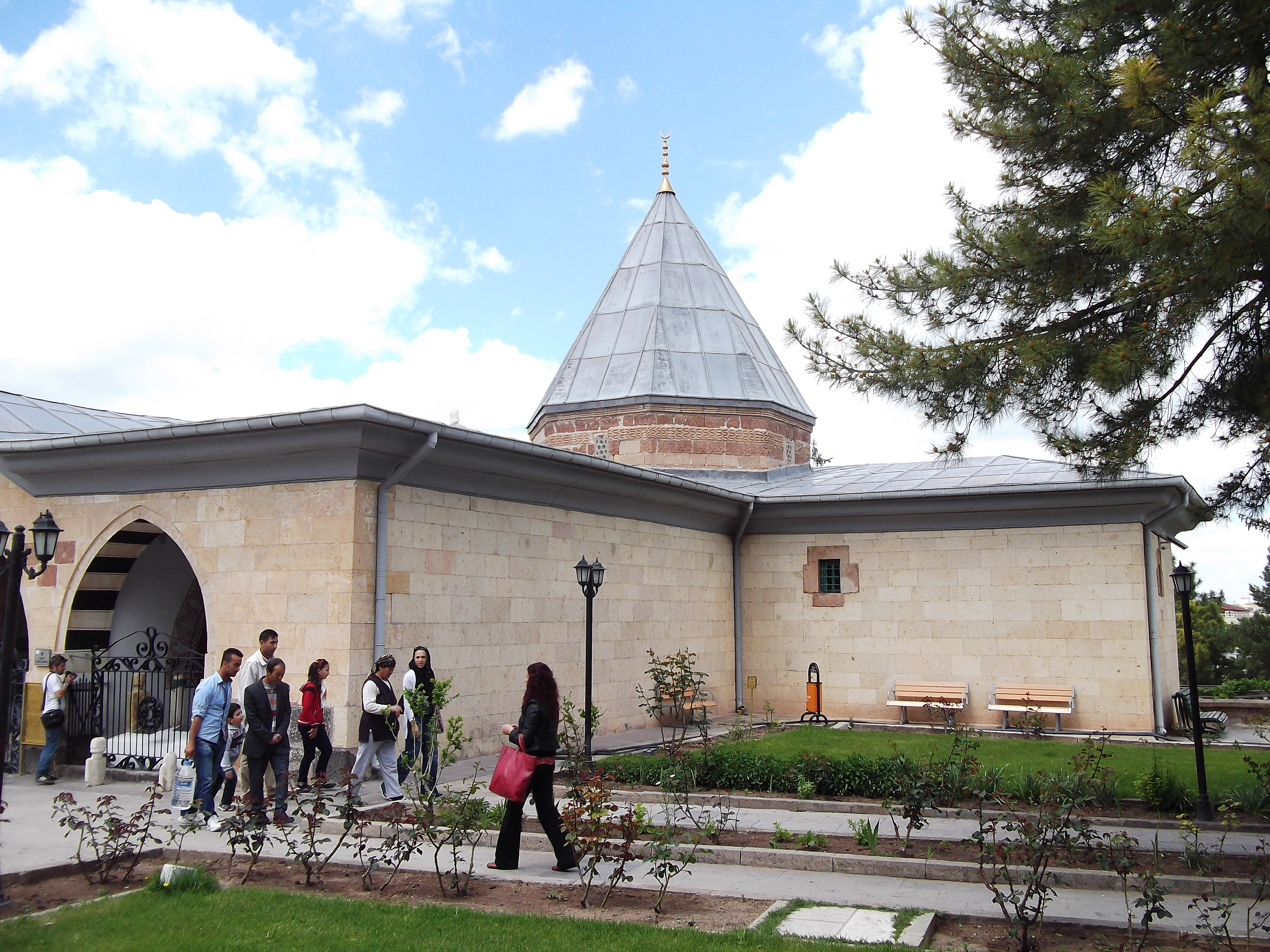
Visitors at the Hajibektash Complex

Nowadays, the Haji Bektash Veli Complex is visited by hundreds of thousands of Alevis, Bektashis, and even Sunni Muslims from Turkey, Albania, and the Turkish diaspora in Europe and around the world. Large festivals are held here every August. Since 2012, the Haji Bektash Veli complex is on the World Heritage Sites Tentative list of the UNESCO.
