= Teketo =

- Village
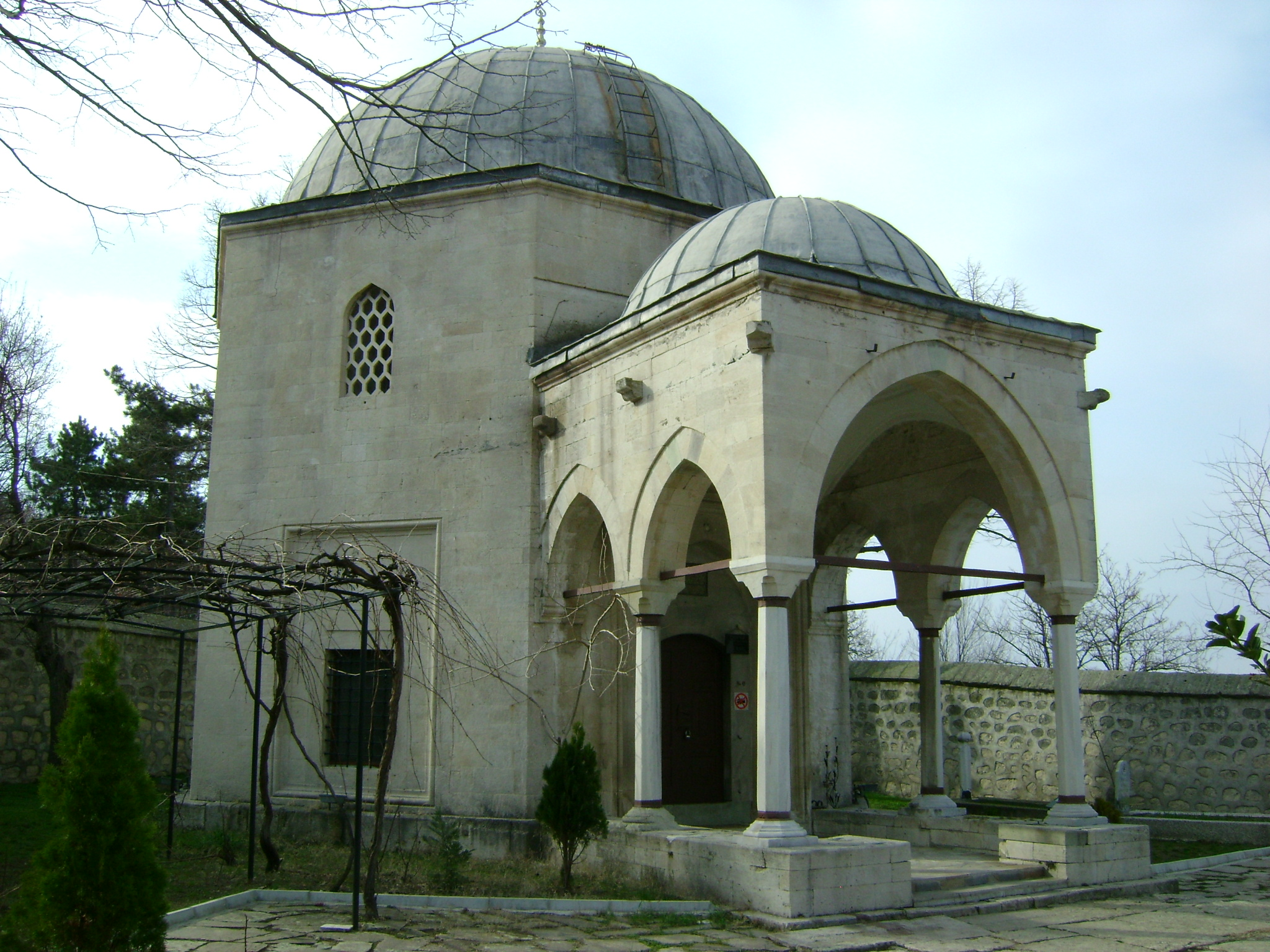
- Türbe of Alevi Saint Otman Baba in Teketo

- Location within Bulgaria
- Coordinates: 41°51′N 25°28′E
- Country: Bulgaria
- Province: Haskovo Province
- Municipality: Haskovo
- Time zone: UTC+2 (EET)
  - Summer (DST): UTC+3 (EEST)

Teketo is a village in the municipality of Haskovo, in Haskovo Province, in southern Bulgaria.

The village once belonged to the Hasköylü Ağalık (Agaluk of Haskovo)
