= Salih Nijazi =

Albanian Bektashi Islamic leader (1876–1941)

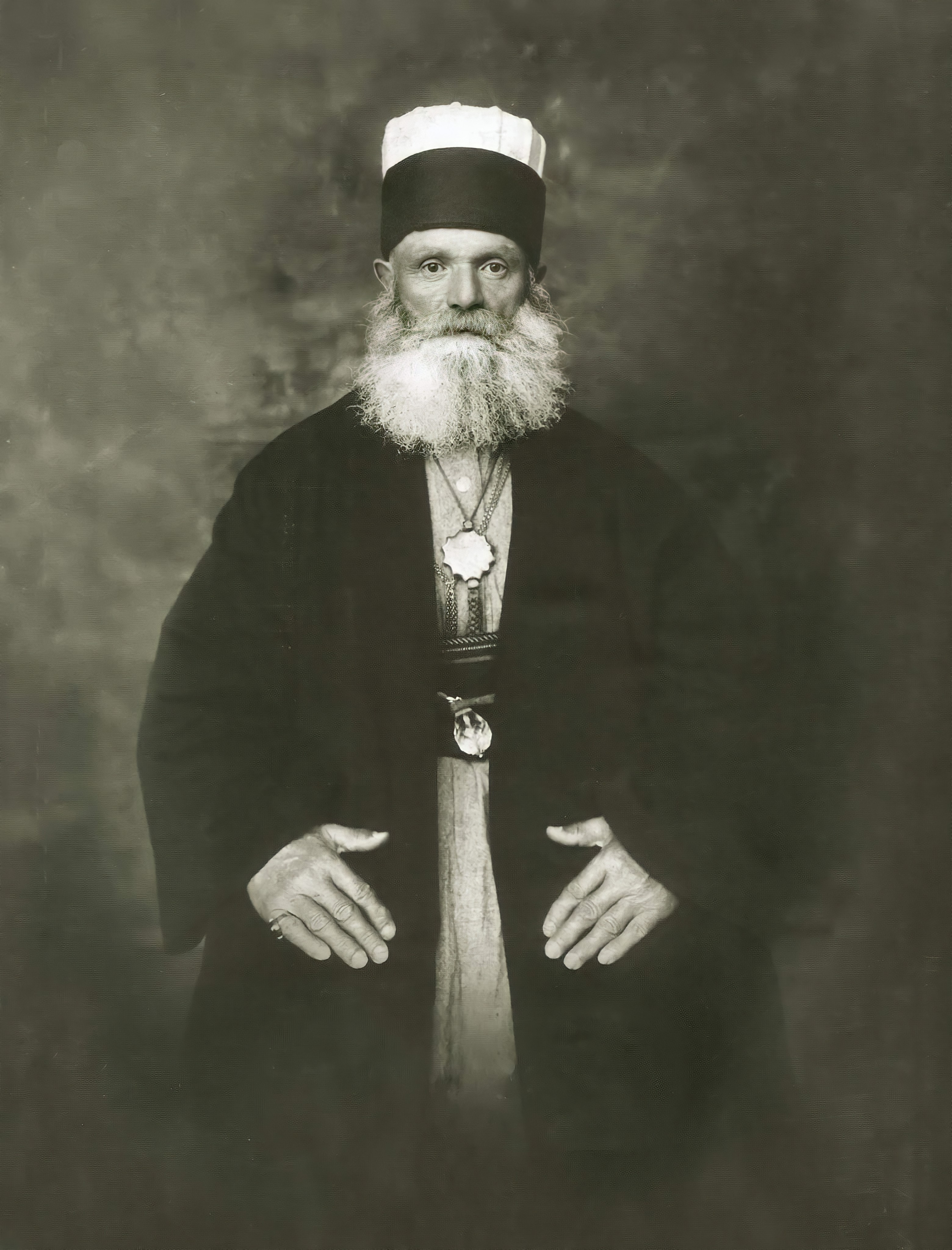
- Official portrait, c. 1940

Dedebaba of the Albanians
- In office 20 March 1930 – 28 November 1941
- Preceded by: Haxhi Fejzullah
- Succeeded by: Ali Riza

Personal life
- Born: 15 March 1876 İstarye, Sanjak of Görice, Ottoman Empire (now Starje, Albania)
- Died: 28 November 1941 (aged 65) Albania
- Cause of death: Assassinated
- Citizenship: Ottoman, Albanian

Religious life
- Religion: Islam
- Order: Bektashi Order

Salih Nijazi (15 March 1876 – 28 November 1941) was Dedebaba of the Bektashians from 1930 until his death in 1941. He was the last Dedebaba of Turkey and the first Dedebaba of Albania.

== Biography ==
=== Early life ===
Salih Nijazi was born on 5 March 1876 in Starja, a village in the Kolonja region of southeastern Albania, which was then in the Ottoman Empire. He and his family emigrated to Istanbul when he was young. He received a Bektashi education at the pir evi of Haji Bektash Veli in Hacıbektaş (Hacıbektaşköy), central Turkey.

=== Religious leadership ===
In 1897, Salih Nijazi served as a muhib under Fejzi Dede of Maricaj. In 1908, he rose to the rank of baba, and was then sent to serve in Albania. When he returned to the pir evi of Haji Bektash Veli, he was appointed as a gjysh (dede).

In 1916, Salih Nijazi was appointed Dedebaba (kryegjysh) of the Bektashi Order, succeeding Fejzi Dede. However, Mustafa Kemal Atatürk banned all dervish orders and their tekkes in 1925 as part of the secularization of Turkey. He unsuccessfully appealed to Atatürk, saying that the Bektashis had helped him gain power in Turkey. As a result, the Bektashis were forced to move outside Turkey and soon operated primarily from Albania.

In 1930, Salih Nijazi established the World Headquarters of the Bektashi movement (Albanian: Kryegjyshata) in Tirana. Nijazi himself became dedebaba reportedly on 20 March 1930. The construction of the headquarters was finished in 1941 during the Italian occupation of Albania.

In Albania, he introduced major Bektashi ceremonies that were traditionally held at well-known tekkes in places such as Hacıbektaş in central Turkey, Dimetoka (Didymoteicho) in Thrace (Greece), Karbala in Iraq, and also Göztepe, Kadıköy in Istanbul.

=== Death ===
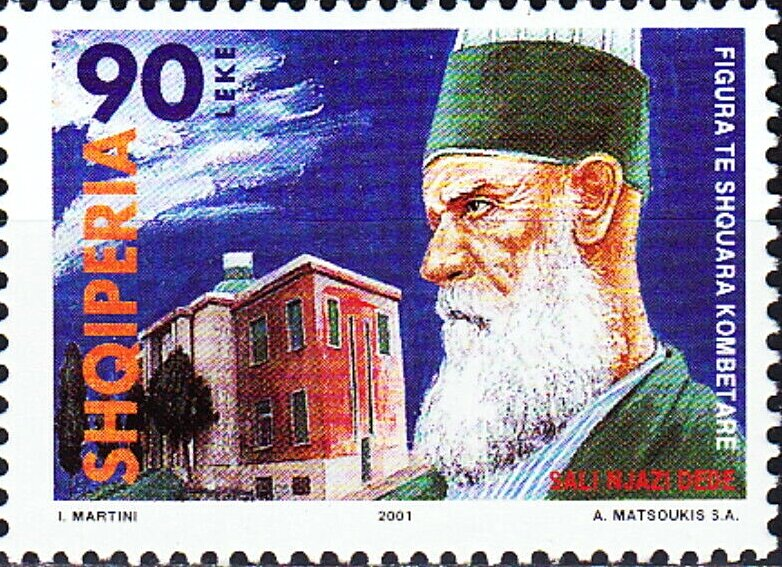
2001 Albanian postal stamp featuring Sali Njazi Dede

On 28 November 1941, Salih Nijazi Dede was murdered by unknown people. His murder remains unsolved, with Albanians claiming that he was murdered by Italian fascists as part of a terror campaign against the Albanian National Liberation Movement, while Italians claimed that he was murdered by brigands (see also World War II in Albania).

Preceded by Fejzi Dede	Dedebaba; 20 March 1930 - 28 November 1941	Succeeded by Ali Riza
