= Dollma Tekke =

Bektashi tekke in Krujë, Albania

Tekke of Dollmë
- Teqja e Dollmës
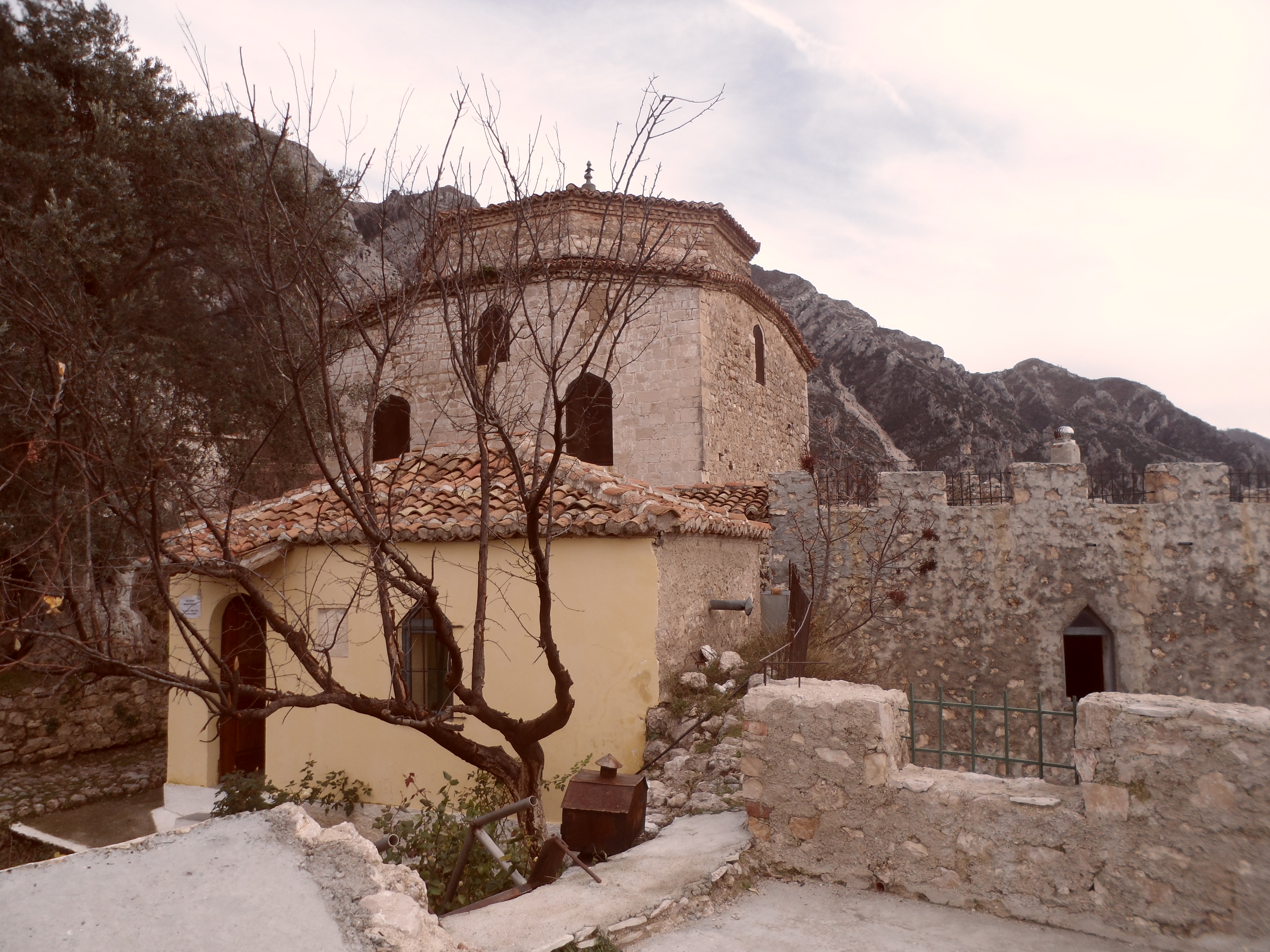
- The tekke, in 2012

- Location of the tekke in Albania

Religion
- Affiliation: Sunni Islam
- Sect: Sufism
- Rite: Bektashi
- Festival: August 11
- Ecclesiastical or organizational status: Tekke
- Status: Active

Location
- Location: Krujë
- Country: Albania
- Interactive map of Tekke of Dollmë
- Coordinates: 41°30′22″N 19°47′34″E

Architecture
- Type: Islamic architecture
- Style: Ottoman
- Founder: Adem Aga Toptani
- Completed: 1193 AH (1779/1780 CE)
- Shrine: 2

Cultural Monument of Albania
- Official name: Tekke of Dollmë
- Reference no.: KR023

The Tekke of Dollmë (Albanian: Teqja e Dollmës) or Haxhi Mustafa Baba Tekke (Turkish: Mustafa Baba Dolma tekkesi) is a tekke, located in Lagjja Kala, Krujë, in Albania. It is located in the southern corner of the fortress of Kruja.

Completed in 1193 AH (1779/1780 CE), the tekke was designated as a Cultural Monument of Albania. Before its destruction by the Communist dictatorship, the tekke of Krujë had 360 holy graves and was known as "Little Khorasan".

== History ==
The tekke was built in 1193 AH (1779/1780 CE) by Adem Aga Toptani (d. 1784), whose marble tomb is inside the tekke. It may have originally been a mosque instead of a Sufi shrine, since there is a mihrab (prayer niche) inside. Pilgrims gathered at the tekke on the feast day of August 11.

The Dollma family is buried inside, and some of the graves are revered as shrines:

- Shrine of Baba Mustafa Dollma
- Shrine of Hysen Dollma, a dervish

== Gallery ==
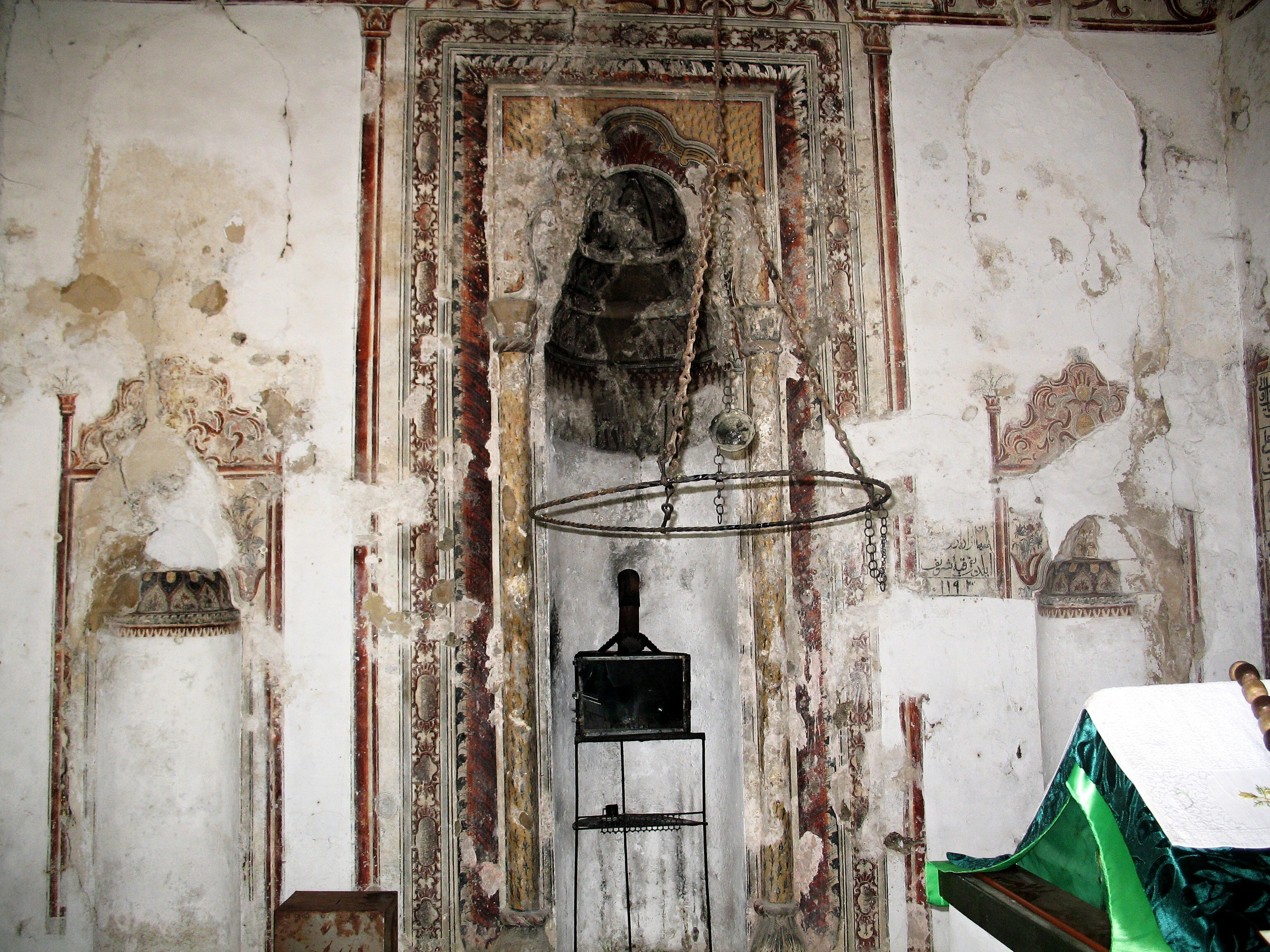
Interior of the tekke

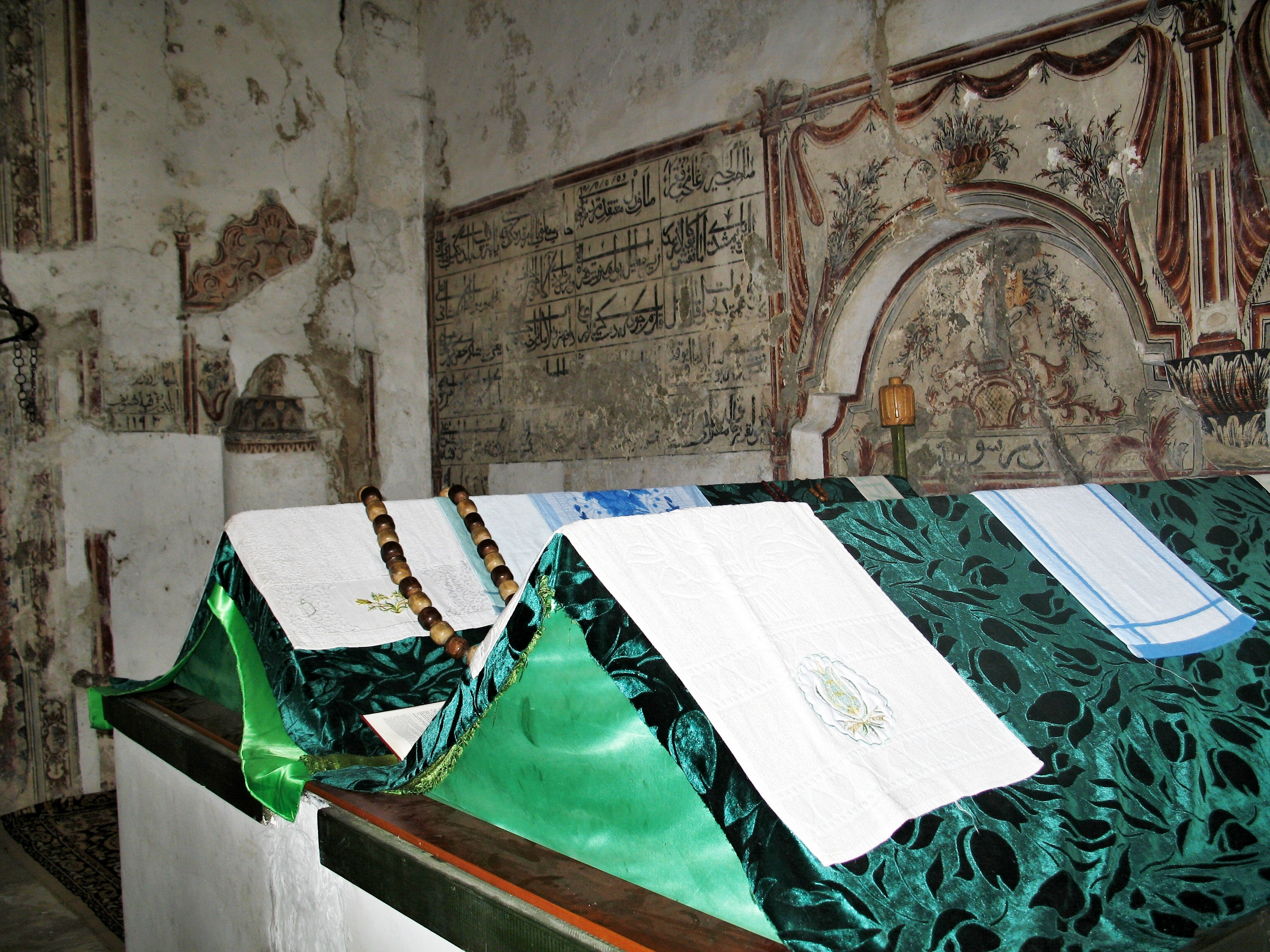
Interior of the tekke

== See also ==
- Islam in Albania
- List of Religious Cultural Monuments of Albania
