= Tekke of Melan =

Teqe in the village of Melan, Southern Albania

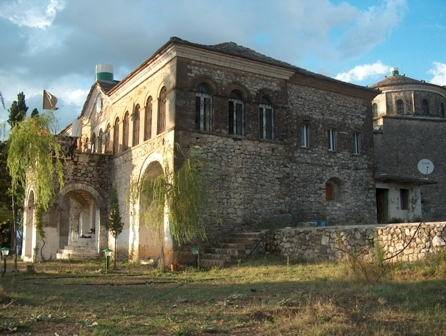
Main building

The Tekke of Melan (Albanian: Teqeja e Milanit) is a khanqah (Albanian: tekke) and a famous pilgrimage site of the Bektashi Order of Sufism. It was built in 1800 in Libohovë, near Gjirokastër in southern Albania. The site lies on a hill overlooking the Dropull plain south of Gjirokastër, on the east side of the valley near the small village of Vlaho Goranxi.

== History ==
In 1800, the tekke was most likely built to replace an earlier one by Baba Aliu, head of the Zall Tekke, but some sources date it to 1870. Baba Aliu's tomb is next to the main building. The courtyard is overgrown with cypress trees and includes an Ottoman shadirvan supplied with water by an aqueduct. The extensive two-story main building includes a prayer hall and adjoining rooms where the Shi’a-influenced Bektashi dervishes pray, study, meditate, and listen to the babas’ sermons. Followers of the order gather for ceremonies as well as outdoor picnics on the grounds.

The hill was home to Epirote and Illyrian forts in antiquity, and material from a fort wall was used to build the tekke. Ceramic remains from the 4th century BC have also been found nearby. The walls were reinforced in the 5th century and 6th century. The remains of a small medieval church can be found here, and a Christian monastery is said to have predated the tekke. Today, the tekke is secluded on the eastern slopes of the valley, but the caravan route through the Drin Valley went through at one point. John Hobhouse, 1st Baron Broughton and Lord Byron traveled through on their journey Ioannina to Tepelenë to meet Ali Pasha of Ioannina. The tekke was badly damaged by Greek troops during World War I and World War II. The area was declared a cultural heritage site in 1963, but would be closed and partially destroyed during an anti-religious campaign mounted by dictator Enver Hoxha of the People's Socialist Republic of Albania in the late 1960s, an emulation of the Chinese Cultural Revolution. The Albanian Armed Forces sometimes used the building. After the ban on religion was lifted in 1990, the tekke was rebuilt by worshipers from Nepravishtë, Libohovë, and Lazarat from 1994 to 2002. Today, the tekke is governed by the Gjirokastër Sufi patriarchate (Albanian: gjyshata) and is staffed by a live-in dervish.
