= Tekija, Ilinden =

Tekija Текија
- Village
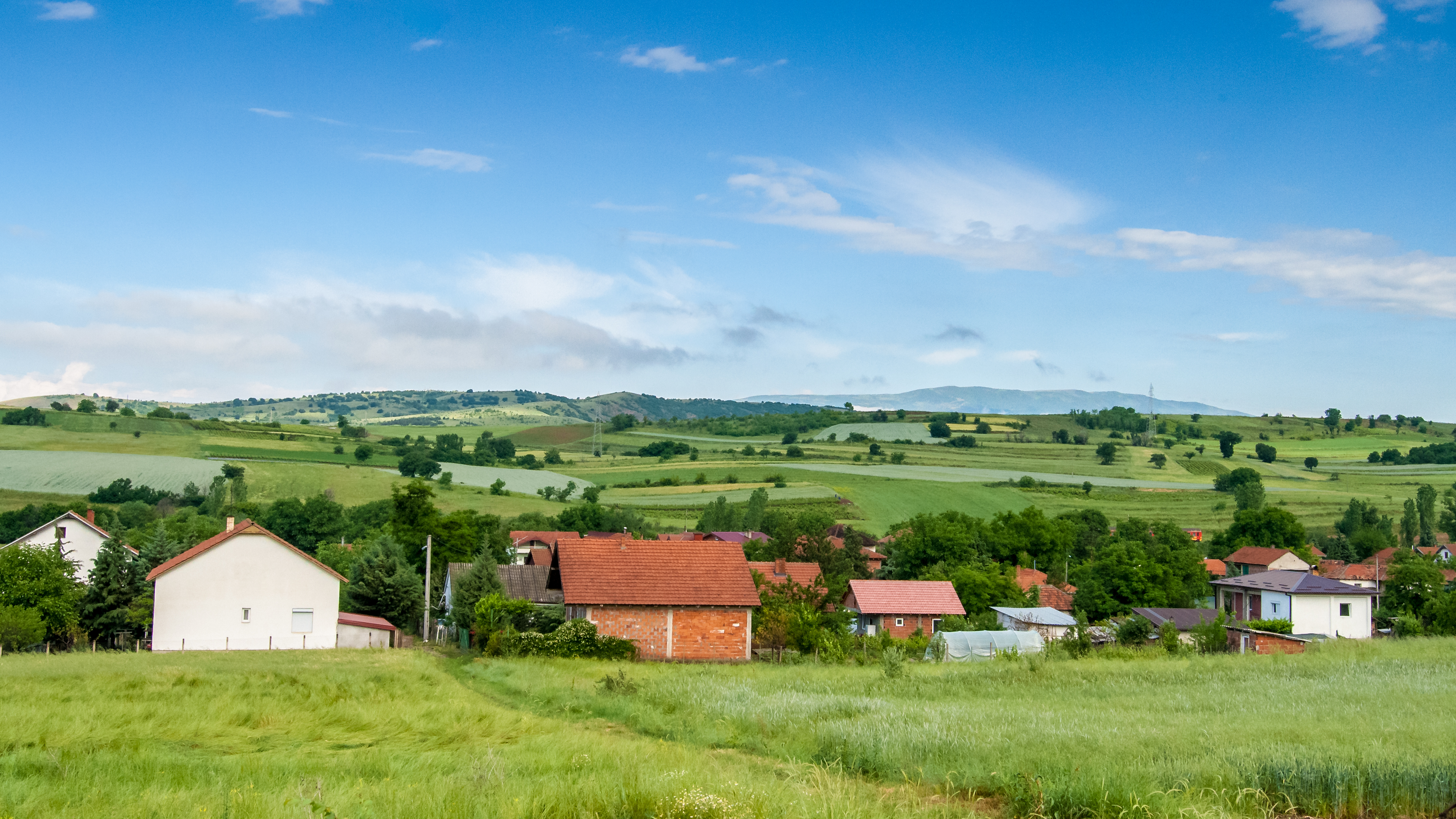
- Panoramic photo of the village Tekija

- Location within North Macedonia
- Country: North Macedonia
- Region: Skopje
- Municipality: Ilinden

Population (2002)
  - Total: 304
- Time zone: UTC+1 (CET)
  - Summer (DST): UTC+2 (CEST)
- Car plates: SK
- Website: .

Tekija (Macedonian: Текија) is a village in the Ilinden Municipality of North Macedonia.

== Demographics ==
On the 1927 ethnic map of Leonhard Schulze-Jena, the village is written as "Tečija" and shown as a Turkish village. According to the 2002 census, the village had a total of 304 inhabitants. Ethnic groups in the village include:

- Macedonians 293
- Serbs 5
- Others 6
