= Dibra =

Dibra is an Albanian surname. Notable people with the surname include:

- Abdurrahman Dibra (1885–1961), Albanian politician
- Arenc Dibra (born 1990), Albanian footballer
- Dino Dibra (1975–2000), Australian suspected murderer
- Gëzim Dibra (born 1956), Albanian politician
- Ilir Dibra (born 1977), Albanian footballer
- Isuf Dibra (died 1927), Albanian politician
- Izet Dibra (1878–1964), Albanian politician
- Klejdi Dibra (born 1992), Albanian footballer
- Muhamet Dibra (1923–1998), Albanian footballer
- Petrit Dibra (born 1953), Albanian footballer
- Ridvan Dibra (born 1959), Albanian writer
- Vehbi Dibra (1867–1937), Albanian mufti, theologian and publicist
