= Zall Tekke =

Tekke in Gjirokastër, Albania

- Teqeja e Zallit
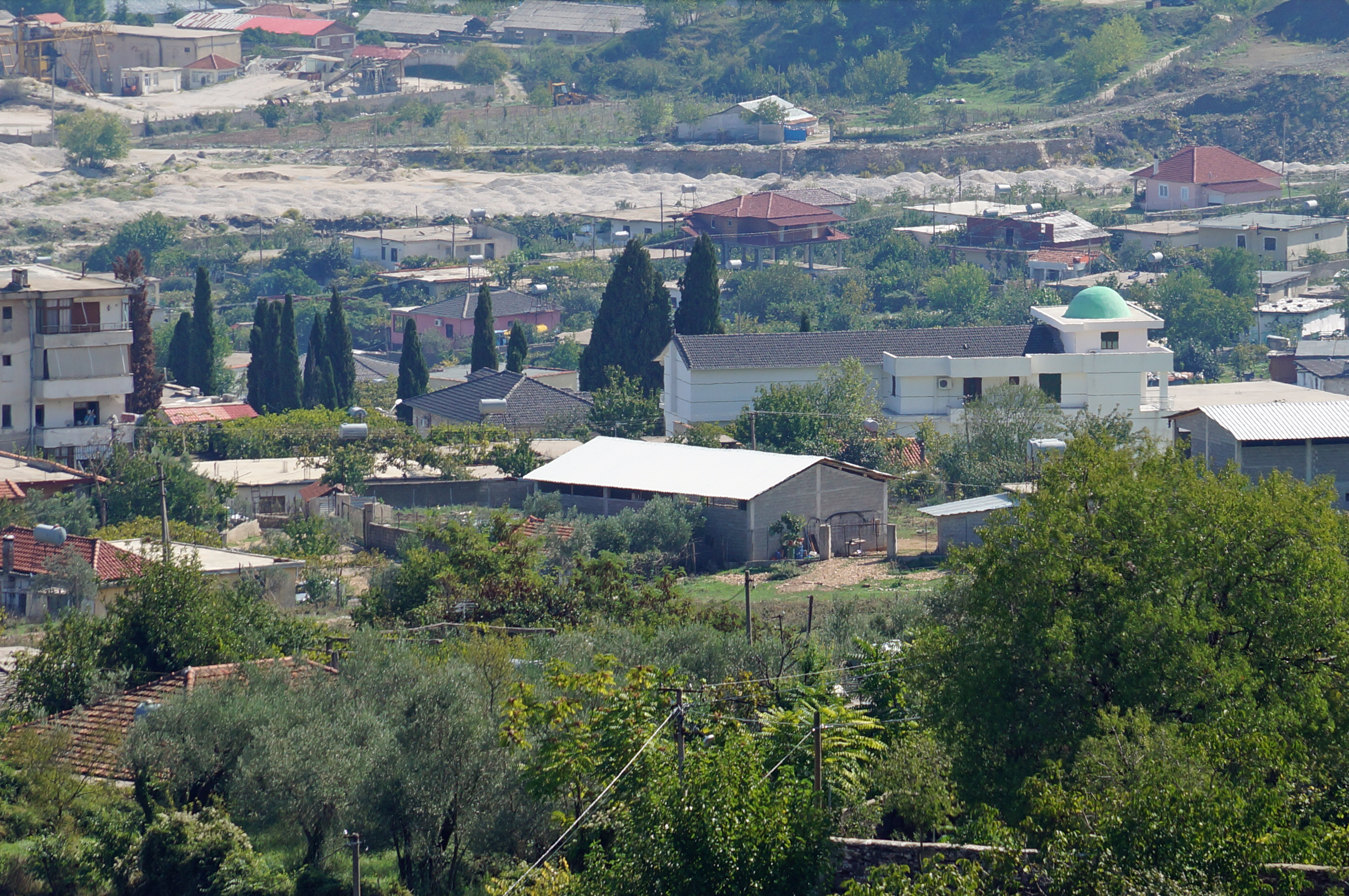
- Taken from behind the tekke, with its green dome, in 2015

- Location of the tekke in Albania

Religion
- Affiliation: Sunni Islam
- Sect: Sufism
- Rite: Bektashi
- Ecclesiastical or organizational status: Tekke
- Status: Active

Location
- Location: Gjirokastër
- Country: Albania
- Interactive map of Zall Tekke
- Coordinates: 40°04′02″N 20°08′57″E

Architecture
- Type: Islamic architecture
- Style: Ottoman
- Completed: 1780 CE
- Dome: 1

Cultural Monument of Albania
- Official name: Zall Tekke

The Zall Tekke (Albanian: Teqeja e Zallit), also known as the Asim Baba Tekke (Turkish: Âsım Baba Tekkesi) is a Bektashi tekke in Gjirokastër, Albania. Completed in 1780 CE, the tekke was designated as a Cultural Monument of Albania.

== History ==
Seyyid Muhammed Asim Baba of Üsküdar (Istanbul) founded the tekke in 1780. It is also known as the Teqeja e Zallit (Gravel Tekke) or as the "Tekke of Pebbles" due to its location at the side of a river bed that is usually dry.

The tekke also hosted a library with books and manuscripts in Arabic, Persian, Turkish, and later also Albanian.

During the Balkan Wars and also during World War I, Greek soldiers were stationed at the tekke for approximately three years. During this time, the tekke did not have any babas and dervishes due to the wars. The baba and dervishes later returned, and the tekke was restored in 1916.

== Clergy ==
The tekke was administered by the following babas.

Order	Name	Term begin	Term end	Years in office	Notes
1	Asim Baba	1780	1796	15–16 years	
2	Hasan Baba Turku	1796	1798	1–2 years	
3	Sulejman Baba	1798	1806	7–8 years	From Gjirokastra
4	Ali Baba Gega	1806	1830	23–24 years	
5	Haxhi Jahja Baba	1830	1836	5–6 years	From Kruja
6	Ibrahim Baba Turku	1836	1846	9–10 years	
7	Hysejn Baba Elbasani	1845	1861	15–16 years	From Elbasan
8	Ali Haqi Baba	1861	1907	45–46 years	From Elbasan
9	Selim Ruhi Baba	1907	1944	36–37 years	From Elbasan

== See also ==
- Islam in Albania
- List of Religious Cultural Monuments of Albania
