= World Bektashi Congress =

Albanian Muslim conferences

The World Bektashi Congress (Albanian: Kongresi Botëror të Bektashinjve), formerly called the National Congress of the Bektashi before the 1990s, is a conference during which leading members of the Bektashi Order make important decisions. It has been held in Albania since 1921.

Since 1945, the National Congress of the Bektashi has been held exclusively at the World Headquarters of the Bektashi in Tirana. The longest gap between two congresses lasted from 1950 to 1993, when congresses could not be held during Communist rule in Albania.

== List of Congresses ==
=== Summary ===
A summary of congresses is given below.

No.	Congress	Date	Location	Notes
1	First National Congress of the Bektashi	14–17 January 1921	tekke of Prishta in the Skrapar region	The name Komuniteti Bektashian (Bektashi community) was adopted.
2	Second National Congress of the Bektashi	8–9 July 1924	Gjirokastra	
3	Third National Congress of the Bektashi	23 September 1929	tekke of Turan near Korça	The Bektashi declared themselves to be a religious community autonomous from other Islamic communities.
4	Fourth National Congress of the Bektashi	5 May 1945	Tirana	Xhafer Sadiku Dede was made Kryegjysh (or Dedebaba), and the influential Baba Faja Martaneshi, a communist collaborator, was made secretary general.
5	Fifth National Congress of the Bektashi	16 April 1950	Tirana	
6	Sixth National Congress of the Bektashi	19–20 July 1993	Tirana	
7	Seventh National Congress of the Bektashi	23–24 September 2000	Tirana	
8	Eighth National Congress of the Bektashi	21 September 2005	Tirana	
9	Ninth National Congress of the Bektashi	6 July 2009	Tirana	

=== 1st Congress ===
The First National Congress of the Bektashi was held on 14–17 January 1921 at the tekke of Prishta in the Skrapar region. The name Komuniteti Bektashian (Bektashi community) was adopted. Attendees also announced that the Bektashi were the first religious community in Albania to be free of foreign domination, hence breaking relations with the Bektashi in Turkey. Kamber Ali and Ali Baba of Tomorr (Baba Ali Tomorri) helped organized the congress.

Bektashi leaders who attended the 1st Congress included:

- Baba Ali Tomorri
- Abaz Hilmi Dedej
- Ali Kamber Prishta
- Baba Selim Gjirokastra (Sulejman bey Delvina) of the Hajdërije tekke of Gjirokastra (b. 1884; d. 1932), a representative of the new Albanian government
- Baba Ahmet Turani (1854–1928), the head of the congress
- Fehim Zavalani

At the 1st Congress, representatives from local tekkes included:

Representative baba	Tekke represented
Baba Meleq	tekke of Alipostivan
Baba Mestan	tekke of Backa
Baba Xhafer	tekke of Brerima or Gjerbës
Baba Rakip	tekke of Drizar
Baba Mustafa	tekke of Frashër
Baba Murat	tekke of Gllava
Baba Sulejman	tekke of Kiçok
Baba Shaban	tekke of Komar
Baba Kaso or Kasem	tekke of Koshtan
Baba Hasa	tekke of Krahës
Baba Selim	tekke of Kreshova
Baba Ahmet	tekke of Kuç, Devoll
Baba Islam	tekke of Kuç, Skrapar
Baba Hasan	tekke of Memaliaj
Baba Ahmet	tekke of Osmënzeza
Baba Muharrem	tekke of Baba Muharrem in Plashnik
Baba Ramadan	tekke of Qatrom
Baba Abaz Malaj	tekke of Rabija
Baba Halim	tekke of Therepel
Baba Bektash	tekke of Vrëpska

=== 2nd Congress ===
The Second National Congress of the Bektashi was held on 8–9 July 1924 at the Hajdërije tekke (also known as the tekke of Haxhi Baba Sulejman) in Gjirokastra. Baba Ahmet Turani served as the head of the congress, while Rexheb Baba of Gjirokastra (1901–1995) served as the secretary general of the congress. In the wake of Atatürk's Reforms, the Bektashi of Turkey began to consider transferring their world headquarters to Albania, and decided that religious ceremonies could be conducted in either Albanian or Turkish. The Bektashis at the 2nd Congress also announced their official separation from the Sunni community in Albania. During the 2nd Congress, the attendees decided that laypeople should be preached to and taught in their mother tongue, such as Albanian or other local vernacular languages.

Bektashi leaders who attended the 2nd Congress included:

- Baba Selim Gjirokastra
- Baba Ali Kamber Prishta
- Baba Ahmet Turani
- Baba Xhaferr Sadik
- Baba Abaz Hilmi

=== 3rd Congress ===
Following the exodus of the Bektashi Order to Albania from the newly formed Republic of Turkey when Atatürk's Reforms banned all dervish orders in 1925, the Third National Congress of the Bektashi was held on 23 September 1929 at the tekke of Turan near Korça. Baba Zylfo of Melçan was the head of the congress. At the congress, the Bektashi declared themselves to be a religious community autonomous from other Islamic communities. They also declared the establishment of the kryegjysh (Turkish: başdede) and that the Kryegjyshata would be their new headquarters in Tirana.

Bektashi leaders who attended the 3rd Congress included Sali Njazi and Abaz Hilmi. Kamber Ali was the head of the congress, and Ali Baba of Tomorr also helped organized the congress.

=== 4th Congress ===
The Fourth National Congress of the Bektashi was held on 5 May 1945 at the World Headquarters of the Bektashi in Tirana. Xhafer Sadiku Dede was made Kryegjysh (or Dedebaba) of the Bektashi community, and the influential Baba Faja Martaneshi, a Communist collaborator, was appointed as the secretary general of the congress. Dede Rustem Melçani, the head of the tekke of Melçan, was also one of the secretaries of the congress.

Bektashi leaders who attended the 4th Congress included Abaz Hilmi and Xhafer Sadik. Since the conservative cleric Abaz Hilmi did not support the Communists' proposed liberal reforms, Xhafer Sadik, who had fought with pro-Communist fighters during World War II, was instead appointed by the Communists to preside over the congress.

=== 5th Congress ===
The Fifth National Congress of the Bektashi was held on 16 April 1950 at the World Headquarters of the Bektashi in Tirana. It was the last congress to be held during the People's Socialist Republic of Albania.

Bektashi leaders who attended the 5th Congress included Ahmet Myftar and Ibrahim Hasnaj (Sekretar i Përgjithshëm i Kryegjyshatës or Secretary General).

=== 6th Congress ===
The Sixth Congress was held on 19–20 July 1993 at the World Headquarters of the Bektashi in Tirana. It was the first Congress held since the fall of Communism in Albania. At the congress, Reshat Bardhi was elected as the Kryegjysh of the Bektashi community.

Important attendees of the 5th Congress included:

- Baba Rexhebi
- Tomorr Aliko (Sekretar i përgjithshëm i kryegjyshatës or Secretary General)
- Hirësia e tij (His Beatitude) Anastas Janullatos
- Hafiz Sabri Koçi (Kryetar i Komunitetit Myslyman or "Islamic community chairman")
- Imzot Rrok Mirdita
- Dede Reshat Bardhi
- Mother Teresa

=== 7th Congress ===
The Seventh World Bektashi Congress was held on 23–24 September 2000 at the World Headquarters of the Bektashi in Tirana.

Dede Reshat Bardhi presided over the 7th Congress. Many topics were devoted to forging new relations between the Bektashi community and other Muslim communities such as the Alevis.

=== 8th Congress ===
The Eighth World Bektashi Congress was held on 21 September 2005 at the World Headquarters of the Bektashi in Tirana.

Bektashi leaders who attended the 8th Congress included Baba Edmond Brahimaj and Dede Reshat Bardhi.

=== 9th Congress ===
The Ninth World Bektashi Congress was held on 6 July 2009 at the World Headquarters of the Bektashi in Tirana.

== See also ==
- Islam in the People's Socialist Republic of Albania
