= Bektashism =

Islamic Sufi syncretic and mystic order

- Abbreviation: Bektashism
- Type: Dervish order
- Headquarters: World Headquarters of the Bektashi, Tirana (seat of the order); Haji Bektash Veli Complex, Nevşehir (cultural)
- Region served: Albania, Bulgaria, Greece, Kosovo, North Macedonia, Turkey, other Albanian and Turkish diaspora
- Dedebaba: Baba Mondi (Bektashi Order); Ali Haydar Ercan (Turkish Bektashi Federation); Esma Ersin (Presidency of Alevi/Bektashi in Turkey)
- Key people: Haji Bektash Veli – patron saint; ʿAlī al-Aʿlā – reorganizer who introduced the ideas of Nāimī; Nesîmî – Ḥurūfī poet and a follower of Nāimī; Balım Sultan; Gül Baba – a Murshid of ʿAlī al-Aʿlā; Salih Nijazi - the last Dedebaba of Turkey and the first Dedebaba of Albania; Baba Rexheb - a pivotal figure in introducing Bektashism to the Western world

Bektashism (Turkish: Bektaşîlik, Albanian: Bektashi) is a Sufi order of Islam that evolved in 13th-century western Anatolia and became widespread in the Ottoman Empire. It is named after the walī (saint) Haji Bektash Veli, with adherents called Bektashis. Origins of Haji Bektash's teachings can be traced back to the scholar Ahmad Yasawi of Turkestan. The highest title in Bektashi chain of succession is Dedebaba, followed by Halifebaba and Baba.

The Bektashi Order of the Albanians and the Balkans is currently led by Baba Mondi, recognized as the eighth Dedebaba, whose seat is at the order’s headquarters in Tirana, Albania. However, the Bektashi Order of Tirana is not recognized by Turkish Bektashis, specifying that Bektashi principles require Dedebaba to be in Anatolia, and the Albanian chain of succession never had Dedebabate.

Bektashis believe in the ismah of the prophets and messengers and the Fourteen Infallibles: Muhammad, his daughter Fatima, and the Twelve Imams. In contrast to many Twelver Shia, Bektashis respect all of the Companions of Muhammad, including Abu Bakr, Umar, Uthman, Talha, Zubayr and Mu'awiya, with Ali considered the greatest of the Companions.

In addition to the spiritual teachings of Haji Bektash Veli, the Bektashi Order was later significantly influenced during its formative period by Hurufism (in the early 15th century), the antinomian dervish order of the qalandars, figures like Ahmad Yasawi, Yunus Emre, the Safavid emperor and head of the Safavid order and Messiah Ismail I, Shaykh Haydar, Nesimi, Pir Sultan Abdal, Gül Baba, Sarı Saltık, and to varying degrees more broadly the Shia belief system circulating in Anatolia during the 14th to 16th centuries. The mystical practices and rituals of the Bektashi Order were systematized and structured by Balım Sultan in the 16th century.

== History ==
=== Origins and establishment ===
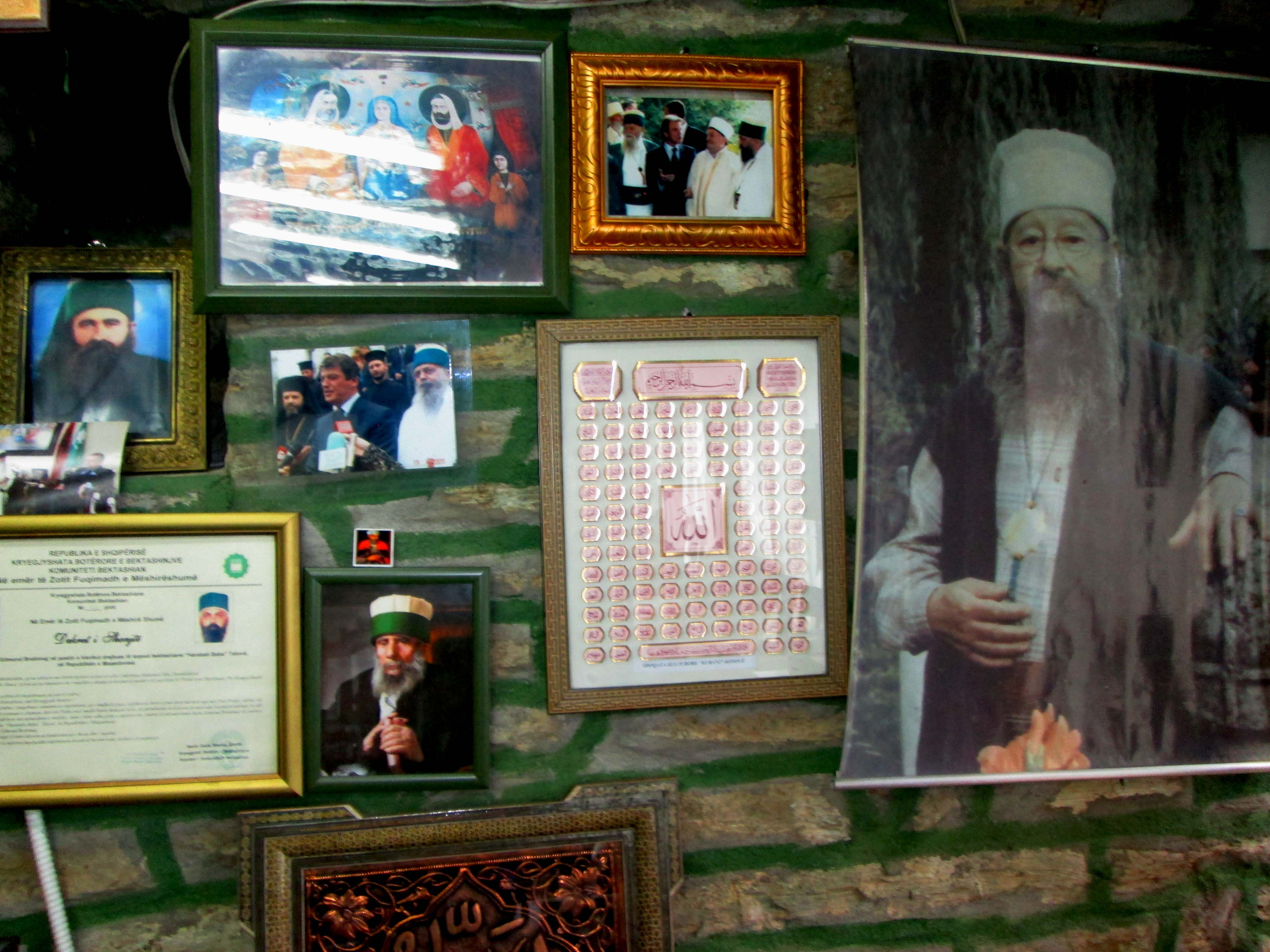
Interior view of Arabati Baba Teḱe, Tetovo, North Macedonia.

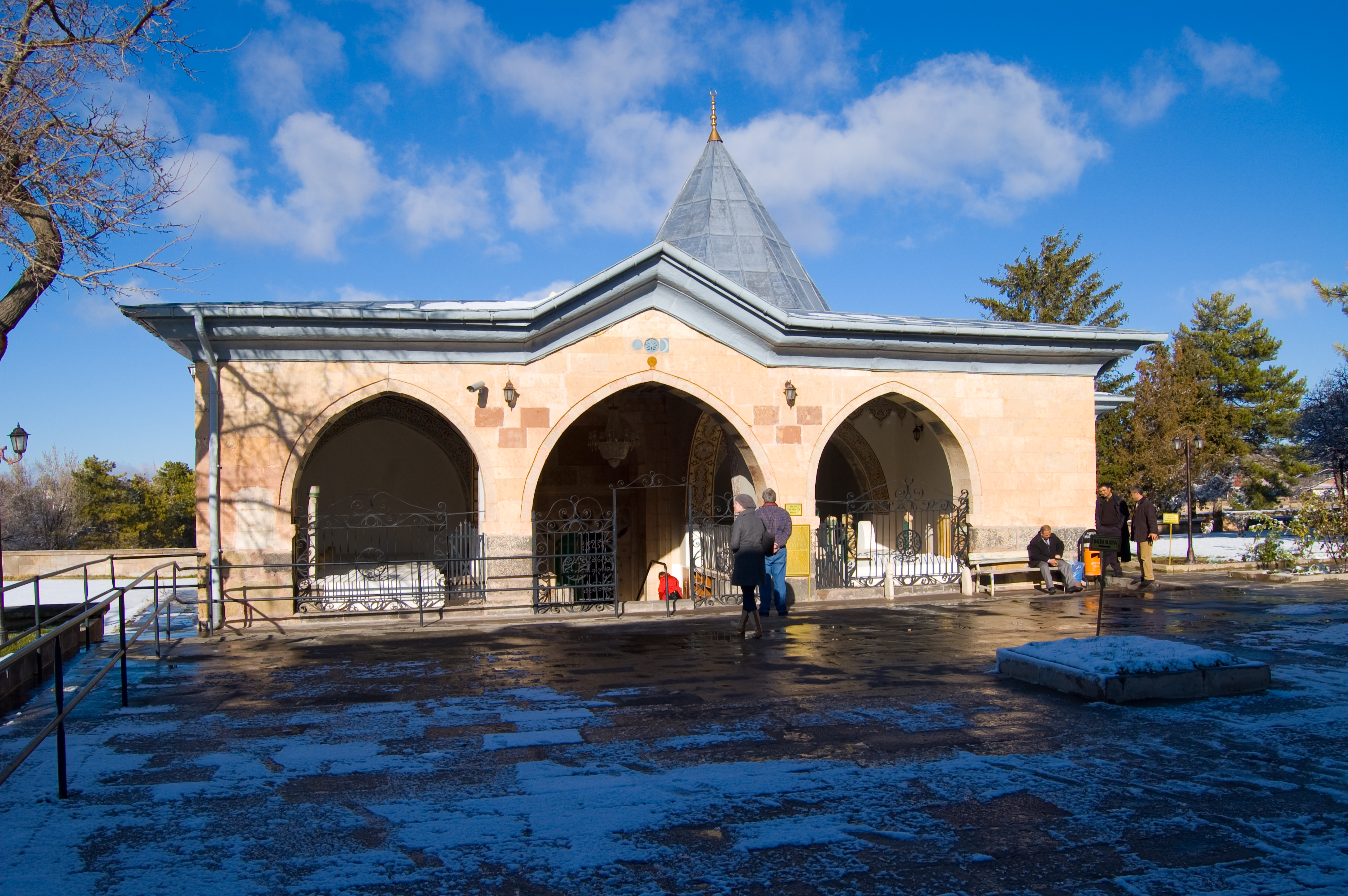
Haji Bektash Veli Complex

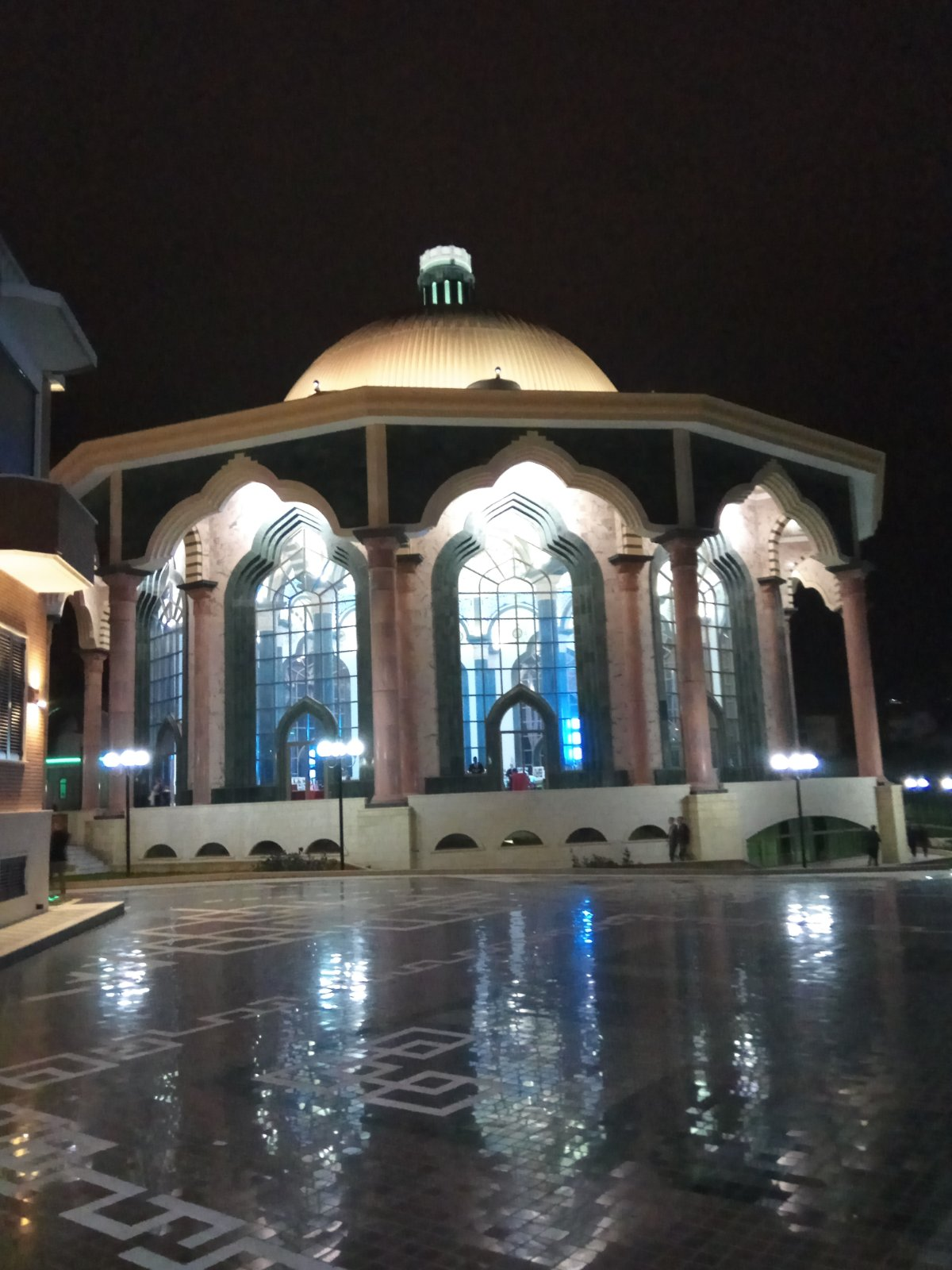
World Headquarters of the Bektashi

Bektashism originated in Anatolia as the followers of the 13th-century scholar Bektash, who himself studied under the mystic Ahmad Yasawi, who was born in Sayram, now in southern Kazakhstan. The doctrines and rituals of the Bektashis were codified by the mystic Balım Sultan, who is considered the pīr-i thānī (“the Second Elder”) by Bektashis.

It was originally founded as a Sufi movement, one of many Sufi orders within Sunni Islam. By the 16th century, the order had adopted some tenets of Twelver Shi'ism—including veneration of Ali, the cousin and son-in-law of the Islamic prophet Muhammad, and the Twelve Imams—as well as a variety of syncretic beliefs.

=== Bektashism under Ottoman rule ===
The Bektashis acquired political importance in the 15th century when the order dominated the Janissary Corps.

The branch became widespread in the Ottoman Empire, with its lodges scattered throughout Anatolia and the Balkans. It became the official order of the Janissaries, the elite infantry corps of the Ottoman military. Therefore, they also became mainly associated with Anatolian and Balkan Muslim converts, mainly Albanians and northern Greeks (although most leading Bektashi babas were of southern Albanian origin).

In 1826, the Bektashi order was banned throughout the Ottoman Empire by Sultan Mahmud II for having close ties with the Janissary corps. Many Bektashi dervishes were exiled, and some were executed, while tekkes were destroyed and their revenues were confiscated. This decision was supported by the Sunni religious elite and the leaders of other, more orthodox, Sufi orders. Bektashis slowly regained freedom with the coming of the Tanzimat

In the Balkans, the Bektashi order had a considerable influence on the Islamization of many areas, primarily Albania and Bulgaria, as well as parts of Macedonia, particularly among Ottoman-era Greek Muslims from western Greek Macedonia such as the Vallahades. By the 18th century, Bektashism began to gain a considerable hold over southern Albania and northwestern Greece (Epirus and western Greek Macedonia). Following the ban on Sufi orders in the Republic of Turkey, the Bektashi community's headquarters was moved from Hacıbektaş in central Anatolia, to Tirana, Albania. In Albania, the Bektashi community declared its separation from the Sunni community and they have since perceived as a distinct Islamic sect rather than a branch of Sunni Islam. Among the most famous followers of Bektashi in Balkans during the 19th century were Ali Pasha of Yanina and Naim Frashëri.

=== Interwar years (1919-1941) ===
Following the Ottoman Empire's post-World War I dismemberment and the foundation of the successor Turkish Republic in 1923, Mustafa Kemal Atatürk banned all Sufi orders and installed the Directorate of Religious Affairs as sole governing entity over religion. Bektashi lodges in Turkey were subsequently closed in 1925, with the order's leadership relocating to Albania and establishing its headquarters in Tirana.

Salih Nijazi was the last Dedebaba in Turkey and the first in Albania, formerly appointed to his role in the latter country on 30 March 1930. The order became involved in Albanian politics, and some of its members, including Ismail Qemali, were major leaders of the Albanian National Awakening (Rilindja).

After the lodges in Turkey were shut down, the order's headquarters moved to Albania. On 20 March 1930, Salih Nijazi was elected as the Dedebaba of the Bektashi community in Albania. Before Nijazi, the Dedebaba was Haxhi Fejzullah in Turkey. Njazi established the Bektashi World Headquarters in Tirana. Its construction was finished in 1941 during the Italian occupation of Albania. Nijazi promoted Bektashi Islam by introducing major ceremonies at popular tekkes. After he was murdered in 1941, Ali Riza succeeded him as the Dedebaba.

=== Post-World War II ===
Bektashism continued to flourish until the Second World War. After the communists took power in 1945, several babas and dervishes were executed and a gradual constriction of Bektashi influence began. Ultimately, in 1967 all tekkes were shut down when Enver Hoxha banned all religious practice. When the ban was rescinded in 1990, the Bektashism reestablished itself, although there were few left with any real knowledge of the spiritual path. Nevertheless, many tekkes (lodges) operate today in Albania.

The most recent head of the order in Albania was Hajji Dedebaba Reshat Bardhi (1935–2011) and the main tekke has been reopened in Tirana. In June 2011, Baba Edmond Brahimaj was chosen as the head of the Bektashi Order by a council of Albanian babas. Today, sympathy for the Order is generally widespread in Albania where approximately 20% to 25% of Muslims self-report as having some connection to Bektashism.

Despite the negative effect of Turkey's ban on lodges on Bektashi life, most contemporary Turkish Bektashis have been generally supportive of the country's Kemalist secularism, since Ataturk's reforms have lessened the religious intolerance historically demonstrated towards the community by the Sunni religious establishment during Ottoman times.

== Beliefs ==
Diagram showing Bektashi as well as other Sufi orders.

Bektashis believe in God and follow all Islamic prophets. Bektashis claim the heritage of Haji Bektash Veli, who was a descendant of Ali, Husayn ibn Ali, Ali al-Sajjad and other Imams. In contrast to many Twelver Shia, Bektashis respect all companions of Muhammad, including Abu Bakr, Umar, Uthman, Talha, Mu'awiya, and Ali who is considered the greatest of them.

Bektashis follow the teachings of Haji Bektash, who preached about the Twelve Imams. Bektashis differ from other Muslims by also following the Fourteen Innocents, who either died in infancy or were martyred with Husayn. Abbas ibn Ali is also an important figure in Bektashism, and Bektashis visit Mount Tomorr to honor him in an annual pilgrimage to the Abbas Ali Türbe on August 20–25.

In addition to the Muslim five daily prayers, Bektashis have two specific prayers, one at dawn and another at dusk for the welfare of all humanity. Bektashism places much emphasis on the concept of Wahdat al-Wujud (Arabic: وحدة الوجود, romanized: Unity of Being) that was formulated by Ibn Arabi.

Makalat is an important Bektashi text, perhaps written by Haji Bektash. Some scholars question whether the Makalat was actually authored by Haji Bektash. Resultingly, those scholars question whether the presentation of Haji Bektash and Bektashism as orthoprax in Islam (practicing orthodox Islam). There remains dispute as to whether Bektashis have historically followed the shariah law of Islam. For example, they are known to use both wine and raki in their ceremonial meetings, and were not known, in earlier times, to have observed the fast of Ramadan or the obligation of five daily prayer times.

Bektashis follow the modern-day Bektashi Dedebabate, currently headed by Baba Mondi. Bektashis consider the Dedebaba as leader over the entire branch.

Bektashism is also heavily permeated with Shia Islamic concepts, such as the marked reverence of Ali, the Twelve Imams, and the ritual commemoration of Ashura marking the Battle of Karbala. The old Persian holiday of Nowruz is celebrated by Bektashis as Ali's birthday (see also Nevruz in Albania).

The Bektashi order is a Sufi order and shares much in common with other Islamic mystical movements, such as the need for an experienced spiritual guide—called a baba in Bektashi parlance—as well as the Sufi doctrine of "the four gates that must be traversed": Sharī'a (religious law), Ṭarīqa (the spiritual path), Ma'rifa (true knowledge), and Ḥaqīqa (truth).

There are many other practices and ceremonies that share similarities with other faiths, such as a ritual meal (muhabbet) and yearly confession of sins to a baba (magfirat-i zunub مغفرة الذنوب). Bektashis base their practices and rituals on their non-orthodox and mystical interpretation and understanding of the Quran and the prophetic practice (Sunnah). They have no written doctrine specific to them, so rules and rituals may vary from one baba to another. Bektashis generally revere non-Bektashi Sufi mystics, such as ibn Arabi, al-Ghazali and Rumi, who are close to Bektashism in spirit though many are from more mainstream Islamic backgrounds.

Like other Muslims, Bektashis consider pork haram (prohibited) and do not consume it, though, unlike other Muslims, they also avoid eating rabbit. Rakia, a fruit brandy, is used sacramentally in Bektashism, where it is not considered alcoholic and is referred to as Dem.

== Poetry and literature ==
Poetry plays an important role in the transmission of Bektashi spirituality. Several important Ottoman-era poets were Bektashis, and Yunus Emre, the most acclaimed poet of the Turkish language, is generally recognized as a subscriber to the Bektashi order.

The Bektashis were quite lax in observing daily Muslim laws, and women as well as men took part in ritual wine drinking and dancing during devotional ceremonies. The Bektashis in the Balkans adapted such Christian practices as the ritual sharing of bread and the confession of sins. Bektashi mystical writings made a rich contribution to Sufi poetry.

A poem from Bektashi poet Balım Sultan (died c. 1517/1519):

İstivayı özler gözüm, (My eye seeks out repose,)
Seb'al-mesânîdir yüzüm, (my face is the 'oft repeated seven (i.e. the Sura Al-Fatiha),)
Ene'l-Hakk'ı söyler sözüm, (My words proclaim "I am the Truth",)
Miracımız dardır bizim, (Our ascension is (by means of) the scaffold,)
Haber aldık muhkemattan, (We have become aware through the "firm letters",)
Geçmeyiz zâttan sıfattan, (We will not abandon essence or attributes,)
Balım nihan söyler Hakk'tan, (Balım speaks arcanely of God)
İrşâdımız sırdır bizim. (Our teaching is a mystery.)

There is no official canon of Bektashism as the central tenet of Bektashism is "seeing the 72 nations in one eye" (which means all nations and religions are inherently same) and that "batin is more important than zahir", however there are generally accepted books attributed to the founding of the order. Makalat (The Articles), where the concept of four gates (sharia, tariqa, marifa, haqiqa) originate from, is according to Bektashis it was written by Haji Bektash Veli himself and by his order translated into local languages from Arabic in oral form and therefore in this form it is considered a central scripture. Another important book of Bektashism is Velayetname (The Book of Walayah), also attributed to Haji Bektash Veli himself, which gives a poetic account of the origin of the sect and the brief history of the faith as it spread through Anatolia. Other important writings are poetry of anonymous poet "Virani", the books of Kaygusuz Abdal, the Erkannames (Guiding Principles) and the poetry attributed to Shah Ismail.

However, despite having a historically developed non-fixed mystical and developing canon, Bektashism officially upholds the Four Holy Books - Torah, Psalms, Gospel and Quran - as central book of the faith and insist they cannot be removed, they are not corrupted in inner meaning even if in zahir they may contradict, and all contain important esoteric meanings beyond their literal textual understanding so there is no rejection of the scriptures instead there is centralisation of scriptures. Bektashis made effort to translate Quran verses into local languages, since scripture is not just in on paper but actions these translations are not direct but in poetic form to show esoteric meaning behind the verses.

== Community hierarchy ==
Like most other Sufi orders, Bektashism is initiatic, and members must traverse various levels or ranks as they progress along the spiritual path to the Reality. The Turkish names are given below, followed by their Arabic and Albanian equivalents.

1. First-level members are called aşıks عاشق (Albanian: ashik). They are those who, while not having taken initiation into the order, are nevertheless drawn to it.
2. Following initiation (called nasip), one becomes a mühip محب (Albanian: muhib).
3. After some time as a mühip, one can take further vows and become a dervish.
4. The next level above dervish is that of baba. The baba (lit. father) (Albanian: atë) is considered to be the head of a tekke and qualified to give spiritual guidance (irshad إرشاد).
5. Above the baba (Albanian: gjysh) is the rank of halife-baba (or dede, grandfather).
6. The dedebaba (Albanian: kryegjysh) is traditionally considered to be the highest ranking authority in the Bektashi order. Traditionally the residence of the dedebaba was the Pir Evi (The Saint's Home) which was located in the shrine of Hajji Bektash Wali in the central Anatolian town of Hacıbektaş (aka Solucakarahüyük), known as the Hajibektash complex.

Traditionally there were twelve of these hierarchical rankings, the most senior being the dedebaba (great-grandfather).

== Demographics and geographical distribution ==
Bektashis are mainly found throughout Anatolia, the Balkans and among Ottoman-era Greek Muslim communities. According to a 2005 estimate by Dedebaba Reshat Bardhi, there are over seven million Bektashis worldwide, though more recent studies put the figure as high as 20 million. According to Albania's latest census in September 2023, Bekhtashis number slightly make up 9% of the Muslim population and 5% of the country's population.

An additional 12.5 million Bektashis are estimated to live in Turkey. The term Alevi–Bektashi is used frequently in current Turkish religious discourse as an umbrella term for Alevism and Bektashism, despite their distinct origins and separate belief systems. Alevi/Bektashi is officially recognized through Ministry of Culture and Tourism under the 'Presidency of Alevi/Bektashi Culture'.

There are also important Bektashi communities among the Albanian communities of North Macedonia and Kosovo, the most important being the Arabati Baba Teḱe in the city of Tetovo, which was until recently under the guidance of Baba Tahir Emini (1941–2006). Following the death of Baba Tahir Emini, the dedelik of Tirana appointed Baba Edmond Brahimaj (known as Baba Mondi), formerly head of the Turan Tekke of Korçë, to oversee the Harabati baba tekke.

A splinter branch of the order sprung up in the Macedonian town of Kičevo in 2019 which has ties to the Turkish Bektashi community under Haydar Ercan Dede rather than the order's headquarters in Tirana. A smaller Bektashi tekke, the Dikmen Baba Tekkesi, is in operation in the Turkish-speaking town of Kanatlarci, North Macedonia that also has stronger ties with Turkish Bektashis.

In Kosovo, the relatively small Bektashi community has a tekke in the town of Gjakovë and was under the leadership of Baba Mumin Lama until his passing in 2021. This community recognizes the Bektashi leadership of Tirana. In Bulgaria, the türbes of Kıdlemi Baba, Ak Yazılı Baba, Demir Baba, and Otman Baba function as heterodox Islamic pilgrimage sites, and before 1842 were the centers of Bektashi tekkes.

Bektashis continue to be active in Turkey and their semi-clandestine organizations can be found in Istanbul, Ankara and İzmir. The community in Turkey was headed by Debebaba Bedri Noyan from 1960 until his death in 1997. There are currently two rival claimants to the Dedebabate in Turkey: Mustafa Eke and Haydar Ercan. A large, functioning Bektashi tekke was established in the United States in 1954 by Baba Rexheb in the Detroit suburb of Taylor, and the tomb (türbe) of Baba Rexheb continues to draw pilgrims of all faiths.

=== Arabati Baba Teḱe controversy ===
In 2002, a group of armed members of the Islamic Religious Community of Macedonia (ICM), a Sunni group that is the legally recognized organisation which claims to represent all Muslims in North Macedonia, unlawfully entered the Bektashi Order's Arabati Baba Teḱe in an attempt to reclaim this tekke as a mosque although the facility has never functioned as such. Subsequently, the Bektashi Order of North Macedonia sued the government for failing to restore the tekke to the Bektashis, pursuant to a law passed in the early 1990s returning properties previously nationalized under the Yugoslav government. The law, however, deals with restitution to private citizens, rather than religious communities.

The ICM claim to the tekke is based upon their contention to represent all Muslims in North Macedonia; and indeed, they are one of two Muslim organizations recognized by the government, both Sunni. The Bektashi community filed for recognition as a separate religious community with the Macedonian government in 1993, which has refused to recognize them.

=== Proposed sovereign state ===
On 21 September 2024, it was reported that Prime Minister Edi Rama of Albania was planning to create the Sovereign State of the Bektashi Order, a sovereign microstate for the order within the Albanian capital of Tirana. Rama said the aim of the new state would be to promote religious tolerance and a moderate version of Islam.

== Administration ==
In Albania, the World Headquarters of the Bektashi (Albanian: Kryegjyshata) divides the country into 6 different administrative districts (similar to Christian parishes and patriarchates), each of which is called a gjyshata.

- The Gjyshata of Gjirokastra (headquarters: tekke of Asim Bab): the regions of Gjirokastra, Saranda and Tepelena.
- The Gjyshata of Korça (headquarters: tekke of Turan): the regions of Korça, Devoll, Pogradec and Kolonja, including Leskovik.
- The Gjyshata of Kruja (headquarters: tekke of Fushë Kruj): the regions of Kruja, Kurbin, Bulqiza, Dibra, Mat, Shkodra and Durrës.
- The Gjyshata of Elbasan (headquarters: tekke of Baba Xhefai): the regions of Elbasan, Gramsh, Peqin, Lushnja, Kavaja, and Librazhd, including Përrenjas.
- The Gjyshata of Vlora (headquarters: tekke of Kusum Bab): the regions of Vlora, Mallakastra, Fier, including Patos and Roskovec.
- The Gjyshata of Berat (headquarters: tekke of Prisht): the regions of Berat, Skrapar and Përmet.

During the 1930s, the six gjyshata of Albania set up by Sali Njazi were:

- Kruja, headquartered at the tekke of Fushë-Krujë
- Elbasan, headquartered at the tekke of Krastë, Dibër
- Korça, headquartered at the tekke of Melçan
- Gjirokastra, headquartered at the tekke of Asim Baba
- Prishta, representing Berat and part of Përmet
- Vlora, headquartered at the tekke of Frashër

National headquarters in other countries are located in:

- Gjakova, Kosovo
- Tetovo, North Macedonia
- Taylor, Michigan, United States

There is also a Bektashi office in Brussels, Belgium.

== World Bektashi Congress ==
The World Bektashi Congress, also called the National Congress of the Bektashi, a conference during which members of the Bektashi Community make important decisions, has been held in Albania several times. Since 1945, it has been held exclusively in Tirana. The longest gap between two congresses lasted from 1950 to 1993, when congresses could not be held during Communist rule in Albania. A list of congresses is given below.

No.	Congress	Date	Location	Notes
1	First National Congress of the Bektashi	14–17 January 1921	tekke of Prishta in the Skrapar region	The name Komuniteti Bektashian (Bektashi community) was adopted.
2	Second National Congress of the Bektashi	8–9 July 1924	Gjirokastra	
3	Third National Congress of the Bektashi	23 September 1929	tekke of Turan near Korça	The Bektashi declared themselves to be a religious community autonomous from other Islamic communities.
4	Fourth National Congress of the Bektashi	5 May 1945	Tirana	Xhafer Sadiku Dede was made kryegjysh (or dedebaba), and the influential Baba Faja Martaneshi, a communist collaborator, was made secretary general.
5	Fifth National Congress of the Bektashi	16 April 1950	Tirana	
6	Sixth National Congress of the Bektashi	19–20 July 1993	Tirana	
7	Seventh National Congress of the Bektashi	23–24 September 2000	Tirana	
8	Eighth National Congress of the Bektashi	21 September 2005	Tirana	
9	Ninth National Congress of the Bektashi	6 July 2009	Tirana	

== List of Dedebabas ==
This section lists the Dedebabas (Supreme Leaders) of Bektashism.

=== In Turkey (before 1930) ===
List of Dedebabas (mostly based in Hacıbektaş, Anatolia), prior to the 1925 exodus of the Bektashi order from Turkey to Albania:

- Haji Bektash Veli (1282-1341)
- Hidër Llalla (1341-1361)
- Resul Balli (1361-1441)
- Jusuf Balli (1400s)
- Myrsel Balli (1400s)
- Balım Sultan (1509-1516)
- Sersem Ali Dede Baba (1551–1569)
- Eihaxh Ahmed Dede Baba (1569–1569)
- Ak Abdulla Dede Baba (1569–1596)
- Kara Halil Dede Baba (1596–1628)
- Eihaxh Vahdeti Dede (1628–1649)
- Eihaxh Sejjid Mustafa Dede Baba (1649–1675)
- Ibrahim Agjah Dede Baba (1675–1689)
- Halil Ibrahim Dede Baba (1689–1714)
- Haxhi Hasan Dede Baba (1714–1736)
- Hanzade Mehmed Kylhan Dede (1736–1759)
- Sejjid Kara Ali Dede Baba (1759–1783)
- Sejjid Dede Baba (1783–1790)
- Haxhi Mehmed Nuri Dede Baba (1790–1799)
- Haxhi Halil Haki Dede Baba (1799–1813)
- Mehmed Nebi Dede Baba (1813–1834)
- Haxhi Ibrahim Dede Baba (1834–1835)
- Sejjid Haxhi Mahmud Dede Baba (1835–1846)
- Saatxhi Dede Baba (1846–1848)
- Sejjid Hasan Dede Baba (1848–1849)
- Elhaxh Ali Turabi Dede Baba (1849–1868)
- Haxhi Hasan Dede Baba (1868–1874)
- Perishan Hafizali Dede Baba (1874–1879)
- Mehmed Ali Hilmi Dede Baba (1879–1907)
- Haxhi Mehmed Ali Dede Baba (1907–1910)
- Haxhi Fejzullah Dede Baba (1910–1913)
- Sali Njazi Dede Baba (1913–1925)

=== In Albania (1930–present) ===
List of Bektashi Dedebabas following the 1925 exodus of the Bektashi order from Turkey to Albania:

No.	Portrait	Name	Term in office	
1		Salih Nijazi (1876–1941)	20 March 1930	28 November 1941
1		Salih Nijazi (1876–1941)	11 years, 8 months and 8 days	
2		Ali Riza (1882–1944)	6 January 1942	22 February 1944
2		Ali Riza (1882–1944)	2 years, 1 month and 16 days	
3		Kamber Ali (1869–1950)	12 April 1944	1945
3		Kamber Ali (1869–1950)	0 or 1 year	
4		Xhafer Sadik (1874–1945)	5 May 1945	2 August 1945
4		Xhafer Sadik (1874–1945)	2 months and 28 days	
5		Abaz Hilmi (1887–1947)	6 September 1945	19 March 1947
5		Abaz Hilmi (1887–1947)	1 year, 6 months and 13 days	
6		Ahmet Myftar (1916–1980)	8 June 1947	1958
6		Ahmet Myftar (1916–1980)	9 or 10 years	
7		Baba Reshat (1935–2011)	20 July 1993	2 April 2011
7		Baba Reshat (1935–2011)	17 years, 8 months and 13 days	
8		Baba Mondi (1959)	11 June 2011	Incumbent
8		Baba Mondi (1959)	15 years, 5 months and 3 days	

== Religious figures ==
Some notable Bektashi religious and legendary figures are:
- Abaz Hilmi, Dede Baba, of the Tekke of Frashër (1887–1947)
- Abbas ibn Ali
- Abdullah Baba of Melçan (1786–1857 (−1853?))
- Abedin Baba of Leskovik
- Adem Baba of Prizren (d. 1894)
- Adem Vexh-hi Baba of Gjakova (1841–1927)
- Ahmet Baba of Prishta (d. 1902)
- Ahmet Baba of Turan (1854–1928)
- Ahmet Karadja
- Ahmet Myftari, Dede Baba (1916–1980)
- Ahmet Sirri Baba of Mokattam (1895–1963)
- Ali Baba of Berat
- Ali Baba of Tomorr (1900–1948)
- Ali Baba Horasani of Fushë Kruja (d. 1562)
- Ali Haqi Baba of Gjirokastra (1827–1907)
- Ali Riza of Elbasan, Dede Baba (1876–1944)
- Alush Baba of Frashër (c. 1816–1896)
- Arshi Baba of Durballi Sultan (1906–2015)
- Arshi Baba of Gjirokastra (d. 1621)
- Asim Baba of Gjirokastra (d. 1796)
- Balim Sultan of Dimetoka (1457–1517)
- Dylgjer Hysejni of Elbasan (b. 1959)
- Edmond Brahimaj, Dede Baba (1910–1947)
- Faja Martaneshi Baba
- Fetah Baba of Backa
- Gül Baba (d. 1541)
- Hajdar Hatemi Baba of Gjonëm (early 19th century)
- Hajdër Baba of Kardhiq (d. 1904)
- Haji Bektash Veli (1248–1337) (Albanian: Haxhi Bektashi Veli; Turkish: Hacı Bektaş Veli)
- Hasan Dede of Përmet
- Haxhi Baba Horasani of Përmet (d. 1620)
- Haxhi Baba of Fushë Kruja
- Hidër Baba of Makedonski Brod
- Hysen Baba of Melçan (d. 1914)
- Hysen Kukeli Baba of Fushë Kruja (1822–1893)
- Ibrahim Baba of Qesaraka (d. 1930)
- Ibrahim Xhefai Baba of Elbasan (d. 1829)
- Iljaz Vërzhezha, Dervish (d. 1923)
- Kamber Ali, Dede Baba (1869–1950)
- Kasem Baba of Kastoria (late 15th century)
- Kusum Baba of Vlora
- Lutfi Baba of Mokattam (1849–1942)
- Mehmet Baba of Fushë Kruja (1882–1934)
- Meleq Shëmbërdhenji Baba (1842–1918)
- Muharrem Baba of Frashër (early 19th century)
- Muharrem Mahzuni Baba of Durballi Sultan (d. 1867)
- Myrteza Baba of Fushë Kruja (1912–1947)
- Qazim Baba of Elbasan (1891–1962)
- Qazim Baba of Gjakova (1895–1981)
- Qamil Baba of Gllava (d. 1946)
- Reshat Bardhi, Dede Baba (1935–2011)
- Rexheb Baba of Gjirokastra (1901–1995)
- Salih Baba of Matohasanaj (19th to 20th centuries)
- Salih Nijazi, Dede Baba (1876–1941)
- Sari Saltik
- Seit Baba of Durballi Sultan (d. 1973)
- Selim Kaliçani Baba of Martanesh (1922–2001)
- Selim Ruhi Baba of Gjirokastra (1869–1944)
- Selman Xhemali Baba of Elbasan (d. 1949)
- Sersem Ali Baba of Tetova (d. 1569)
- Shemimi Baba of Fushë Kruja (1748–1803)
- Sulejman Baba of Gjirokastra (d. 1934)
- Tahir Nasibi Baba of Frashër (d. 1835)
- Tahir Baba of Prishta (19th century)
- Xhafer Sadiku, Dede Baba (1874–1945)

== Gallery ==
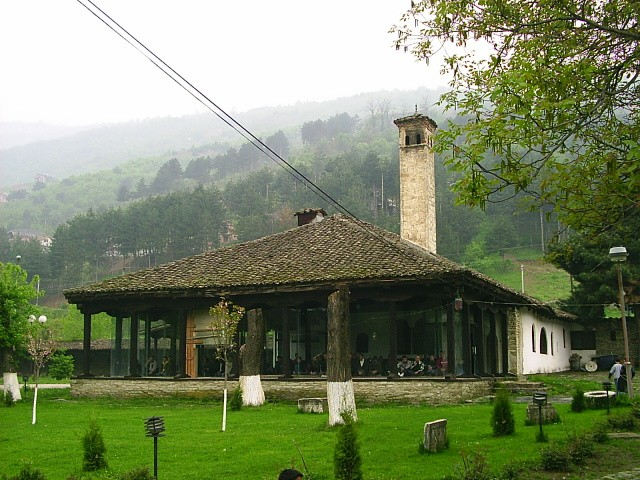
Arabati Baba Tekke, in Tetovo

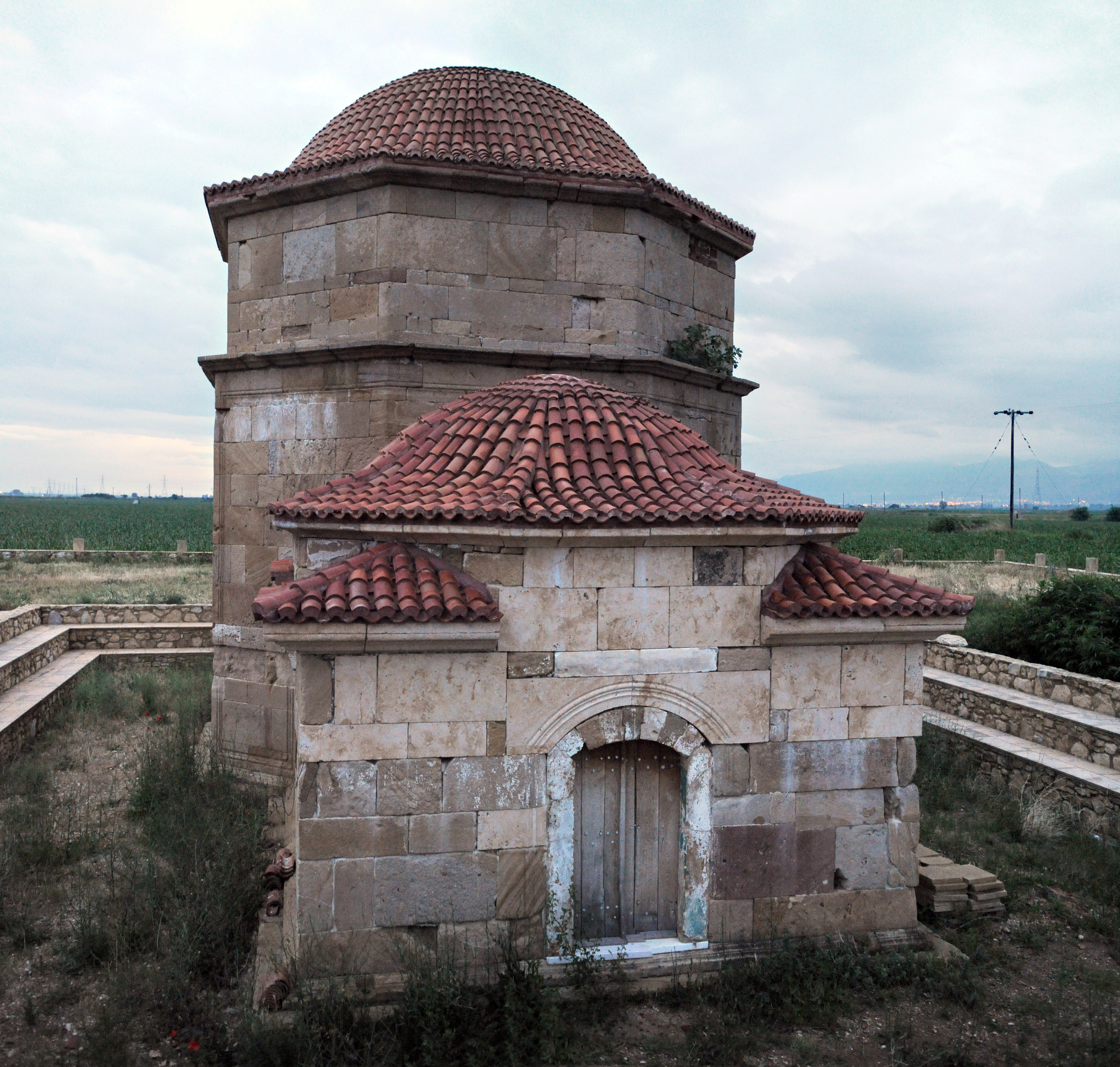
Kutuklu Baba Tekke in Greece

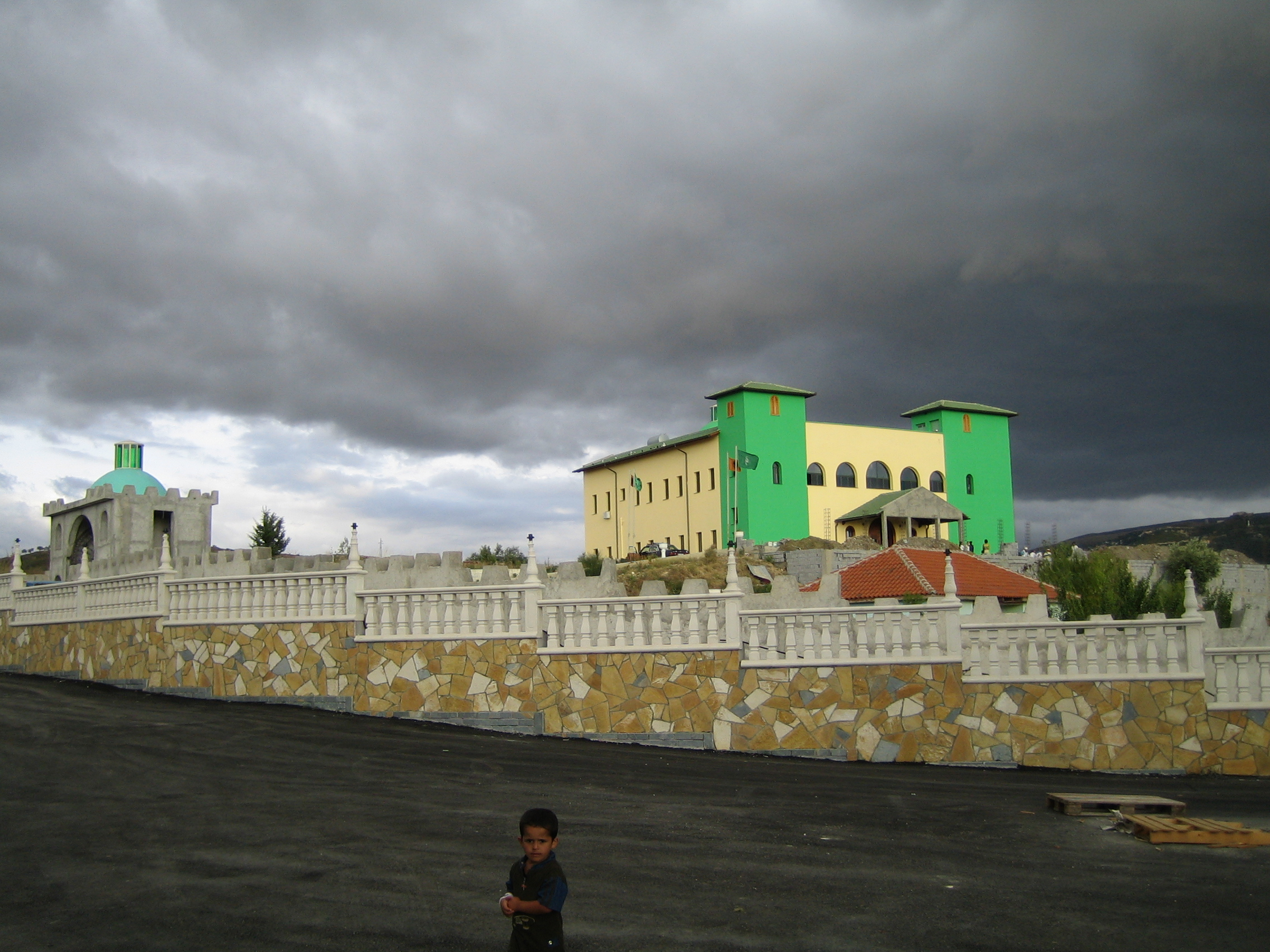
Bektashi tekke on the Kuz-Baba Hill in Vlorë, Albania

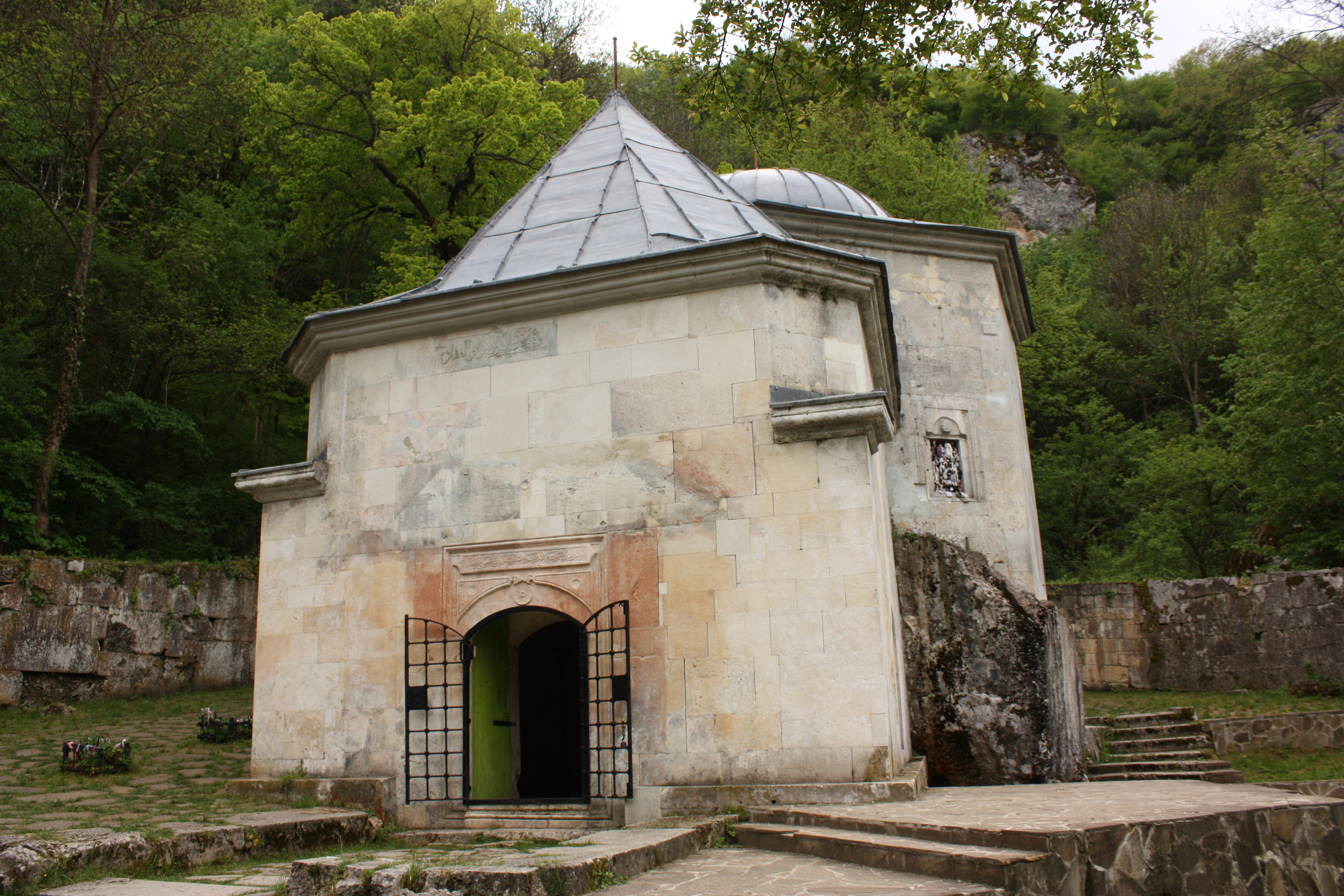
Demir Baba Teke near Sveshtari, Bulgaria (16th century)

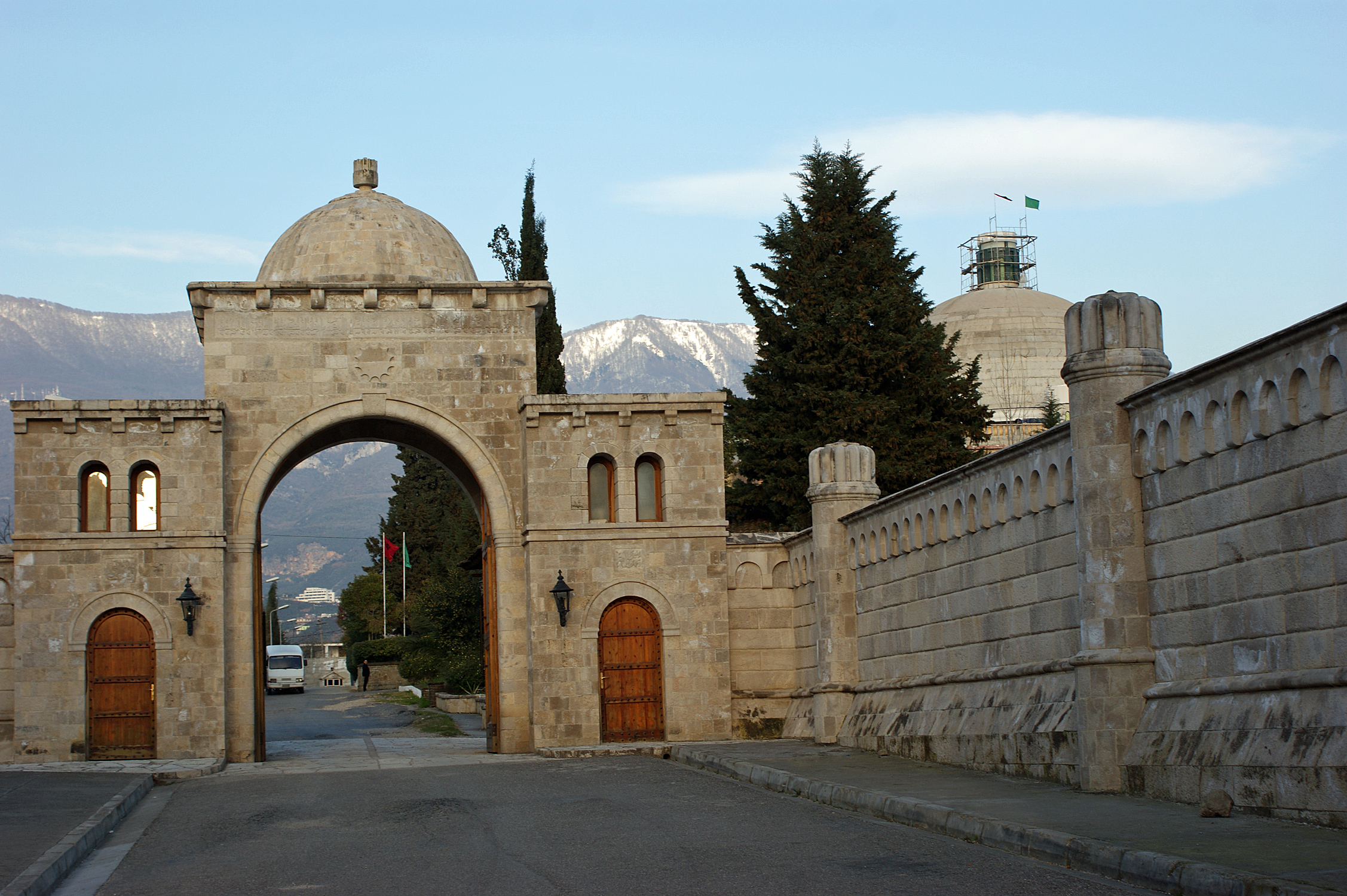
World Headquarters of the Bektashi Community in Tirana, Albania
