= Baba Mondi =

Albanian Bektashi Dedebaba and religious leader

Hajji Baba Mondi
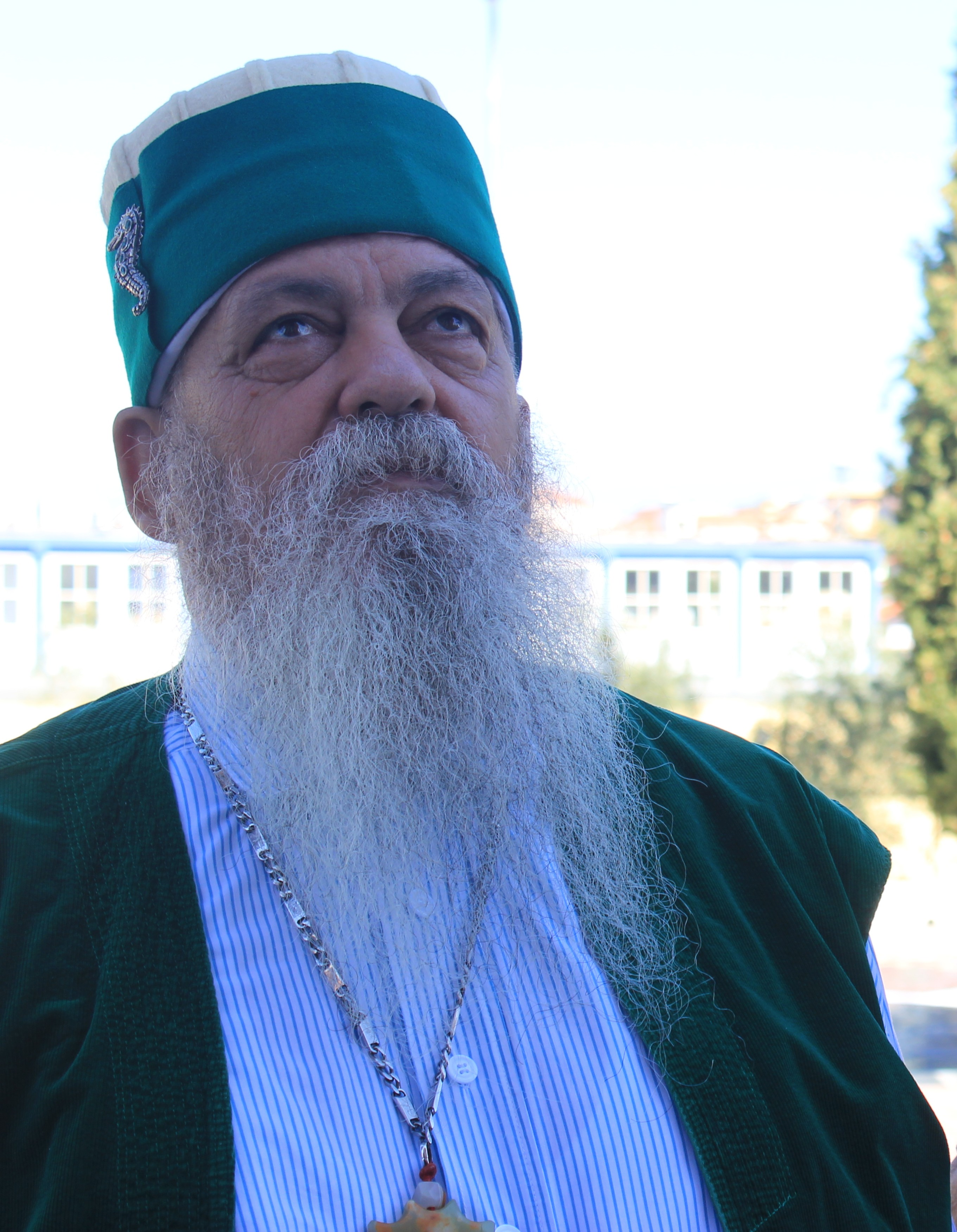
- Mondi in 2017

8th Dedebaba of Bektashism
- Incumbent
- Assumed office 11 June 2011
- Preceded by: Reshat Bardhi

Personal life
- Born: Edmond Brahimaj; 19 May 1959 (age 67) Vlorë, Albania

Religious life
- Religion: Islam
- School: Bektashi

Edmond Brahimaj (Albanian: Haxhi Dede Edmond Brahimaj, born 19 May 1959), commonly known by his official title Baba Mondi, is an Albanian religious leader and the eighth Bektashi Dedebaba (or Kryegjysh) of the Bektashi Sufi Order. In his role as head of the order, he also represents Albania's Bektashi community, which accounts for an estimated 5% of the population. If the planned nation of the Sovereign State of the Bektashi Order is approved, Baba Mondi is slated to preside over the new country in his role as the order's spiritual head.

== Early life ==
Edmond Brahimaj was born to devout Bektashi Muslims in Vlorë, Albania. He finished middle school in Vlorë and graduated from a state military academy. Beginning in 1982, he was an officer in the Albanian People's Army. In 1991, upon the fall of Albania's communist government, he was released from his military duty.

He subsequently participated in the revival of the Bektashi community in post-Communist Albania, serving on the Organizing Council of the World Headquarters of the Bektashi in Tirana. Beginning on 2 January 1992, he studied under Dedebaba Reshat Bardhi, achieving the status of a dervish on 16 May 1996. His first assignment was serving as the head of the Bektashi tekke in Korçë.

== Bektashi leadership ==
Following the death of Baba Tahir Emini in March 2006, the dedelik of Tirana appointed Brahimaj (Baba Mondi), to oversee the Harabati baba tekke in Tetovo, North Macedonia. On 11 June 2011, Baba Brahimaj was chosen as the head of the Bektashi order by a council of Albanian Babas, succeeding Dedebaba Bardhi.

In 2024, it was announced that Mondi had spoken with Edi Rama, Prime Minister of Albania, about the creation of the Sovereign State of the Bektashi Order.

In an interview following the announcement, Baba Mondi stated that citizenship in the new state would be restricted to clerics and those involved in its administration, similar to the Vatican’s structure. He also expressed his belief that achieving sovereign status would strengthen the Bektashi Order and its ability to combat radical ideologies affecting both the Muslim world and the global community.

The Bektashi Order expects that the international community will recognize and support its sovereignty due to its advocacy of moderate religious values. Baba Mondi emphasized that many countries, particularly those grappling with religious extremism or tensions, have a vested interest in supporting peaceful and moderate movements like the Bektashi Order. He highlighted that nations such as Saudi Arabia, the UAE, and Qatar, which play influential roles in the Islamic world, may see value in supporting the Order’s peaceful Sufi Shia tradition. Additionally, countries like China, facing challenges with militant Islam, could align with the Bektashi Order as a way to counter extremism without deepening divisions. The Order believes that, over time, the international community will recognize the importance of amplifying moderate voices and view the Sovereign State of the Bektashi Order as a positive force for global peace, tolerance, and dialogue.

== Interfaith engagement ==
Baba Mondi is a proponent of interfaith dialogue and has leveraged his leadership to promote the involvement faith-based communities in addressing global challenges. In May 2016, he met with Pope Francis at the Vatican, in the first ever visit there by a Bektashi leader as well as any Albania religious figure. Baba Mondi held a second meeting in the Vatican with Pope Francis in January 2025, in which the leaders signed the Document on Human Fraternity (the Abu Dhabi declaration). The pope also expressed support for the proposed Bektashi state, calling it a "beautiful initiative". He has utilised other foreign trips to develop friendly ties with a range of religious communities and individual leaders, such as Ecumenical Patriarch Bartholomew I in Istanbul and various Christian denominational heads in Romania.

Within Albania, Baba Mondi often meets with leaders of other religious faiths and denominations, such as Christian Orthodox, Episcopal, and Evangelical movements and the Jewish community. In January 2026, he was elected for a year-long term as the chairman of the Presidency of the Interreligious Council of Albania. In October 2026, he was a key guest of world religious leaders attending the Vatican's 60th anniversary of issuing the Nostra aetate directive regarding Catholic engagement with other religions.

Preceded by Reshat Bardhi	Dedebaba; 11 June 2011 - present	Succeeded by
