= Abaz Hilmi =

Religious leader

Dede Abaz Hilmi

5th Bektashi Dedebaba
- In office 6 September 1945 – 19 March 1947
- Preceded by: Xhafer Sadik
- Succeeded by: Ahmet Myftar

Personal life
- Born: 13 March 1887 Mërtinj, near Permedi, Sanjak of Yanina, Ottoman Empire (today Albania)
- Died: 18 March 1947 (aged 60) Albania

Religious life
- Religion: Islam
- Order: Bektashi Order

Abbas Hilmi (Abaz Hilmi Dede; 13 March 1887 – 18 March 1947) was the 5th Dedebaba (or Kryegjysh) of the Bektashi Order.

== Biography ==
=== Early years ===
Abaz Hilmi was born and raised in Mërtinj village in the Përmet region, which was then in the Ottoman Empire. Around 1905, he became a dervish under Baba Shaban at the tekke of Baba Tahir in Prishta, Skrapar.

=== From World War I to World War II ===
He and Baba Shaban fled the tekke in January 1914, when Greece occupied Albanian tekkes and destroyed many of them. They lived in exile in Egypt for four years and were finally able to return to Albania in 1918. Back in Albania, he helped rebuild the tekkes at Prishta, Suka, and Frashër. Abaz Hilmi also attended the first, second and third National Congresses of the Bektashi in 1921, 1924 and 1929. He was also baba at the tekke of Frashër from 1942 to 1945, during World War II.

=== After World War II ===
However, Abaz Hilmi was not liked by the Communists during the years directly following World War II. Xhafer Sadik was set up by the Communists to preside over the Fourth National Congress of the Bektashi in May 1945, and Abaz Hilmi was appointed Dedebaba on 6 September 1945. Nonetheless, Abaz Hilmi would only hold that position until 19 March 1947 when he committed suicide. Baba Faja Martaneshi had pushed for liberal reforms such as allowing clerics to marry, shave their beards, and wear non-clerical clothing, reforms which Abaz Hilmi had opposed.

=== Murder–suicide ===
On 19 March 1947, Abaz Hilmi shot and killed both Baba Faja Martaneshi and Baba Fejzo Dervishi, and also killed himself afterwards. Ahmet Myftar was subsequently appointed as Dedebaba by the Communist regime on 8 June 1947.

== Tyrbe ==
Today, the remains of Dede Baba Abaz Hilmi are buried in a tyrbe at the World Headquarters of the Bektashi (Albanian: Kryegjyshata) in Tirana, Albania.

| Preceded by Xhafer Sadik | Dedebaba; 6 September 1945 - 19 March 1947 | Succeeded by Ahmet Myftar |
