= Ali Tomorri =

Albanian historian

Personal life
- Born: 1900 or 1893 Shalës near Tepelena, Albania
- Died: 14 January 1948 Albania

Religious life
- Religion: Islam
- Order: Bektashi Order

Baba Ali Tomorri (1900–1948; also known as Ali Tyrabiu, Ali Turabiu, Ali Baba of Tomorr, Baba Ali of Tomorr, and Varf Ali Prishta) was an Albanian Bektashi religious leader.

== Biography ==
Ali Tomorri was born Ali Abaz Skëndi in either 1900 or 1893 in Shalës near Tepelena. He completed his schooling in Berat, and then studied in Kozani, which is currently in Greece.

He returned to Albania in 1913 and was initiated as a muhib (Sufi disciple) at the tekke of Prishta by Baba Shaban, later becoming a dervish at the same tekke. At the tekke of Prishta, he became known as Varf Ali Prishta, with the title Varf literally meaning ‘poor dervish’ (related to the Albanian word i varfër ‘poor’).

In 1922, Baba Ahmet Turani appointed him as a baba and assigned him to lead the tekke of Kulmak on Mount Tomorr. From then on, he became known by the name Baba Ali Tomorri.

During the 1920s, Ali Tomorri organized the first few World Bektashi Congresses, including the 1st, 2nd, and 3rd Congresses.

Ali Tomorri fought during World War II. In 1946, he was sent to the Asim Baba Tekke in Gjirokastra by the Communist government, where he replaced Baba Selim Gjirokastra (died 1944). However, in 1947, he was accused of espionage and working with the British, for which he was executed on 14 January 1948.

== Writings ==
Ali Tomorri wrote 6 books and various articles, and also composed original Albanian poetry. Unlike his predecessors, he wrote in Latin instead of Arabic script.

=== Books ===
- Bektashinjt e Shqipëries (The Bektashi of Albania) (1921)
- Thelbi i qëllimit (The Core of the Purpose)
- Literatyra e Bektashivet a vjersha të përkthyera prej shkrimtarëve bektashinj të vjetër (Bektashi Literature or Verse Translated from Old Bektashi Writers) (1927)
- Mercija (apo ceremonia e shënjtë e Bektashivet kur shënjtërohet Ashyréja) (Mersiye (the Sacred Ceremony of the Bektashi When Ashura Is Observed)) (1928)
- Historija e Bektashinjvet (History of the Bektashi) (1929)
- Xhevher ose mendim edhe aforizma Bektashijsh të vjetër (Jewels or Thoughts and Aphorisms of the Old Bektashi) (1934)
- Nefeze dhe gazele bektashiane (Bektashi Nefes and Ghazels) (1934)
