= Reshat Bardhi =

Dedebaba of Bektashism from 1991 to 2011

Hajji Dede Reshat Bardhi

Dedebaba of Bektashism
- In office 1991 – 2 April 2011
- Preceded by: Ahmet Myftar
- Succeeded by: Edmond Brahimaj

Personal life
- Born: 4 March 1935 Lusën, Ujëmisht, Albanian Kingdom
- Died: 2 April 2011 (aged 76) Tirana, Albania

Religious life
- Religion: Islam
- Denomination: Shia
- School: Twelverism
- Movement: Bektashism

al-Hajj Dedebaba Reshat Bardhi (4 March 1935 – 2 April 2011) was Dedebaba of Bektashism from 1991 to 2011.

== Life ==
Bardhi was born on 4 March 1935 in village of Lusën, in the region of the northern Albanian town of Kukës. In 1944, as the destruction of war raged around him, Dede Reshat moved to Tirana with his family. It was there that he received both his secular as well as Islamic religion education.

When he was 14 years old, Dede Reshat visited the Mother Tekke of the Bektashi Sufi Order (asitâne-i madhe) and from that time took up residence there. Four years later, at the age of eighteen, he was initiated as a dervish, and served as rehber in the ceremonies that took place on the sacred premises of the Mother Tekke.

Between 1957 and 1967, Dede Reshat was placed under house arrest by the communist government along with Dedebaba Ahmed Myftar in a small tekke near Drizar, Mallakastra. In the ten years of exile, this tekke served as the unofficial Mother Tekke of the Bektashi community. Believers would come here illegally from all over Albania and Yugoslavia.

With the closure of all houses of worship and the prohibition of religion by the communists in 1967 (which lasted until 1990), Dede Reshat was forcibly assigned work on a state-run farm, where he was continually harassed, both psychologically and physically, by state security officers. Meanwhile, his residence in Tirana was turned into an illegal center for keeping Bektashism alive.

Along with a group of devout Bektashi believers Dede Reshat reopened the Mother Tekke of the Bektashi Sufi Order on March 22, 1991, the day of the festival of Sultan Nevruz. During the communist period, the building had been used as state-run home for the elderly. On that occasion, he was chosen as the spiritual leader of the Bektashis in Albania.

In November 1991, Dede Reshat made the pilgrimage to the holy city of Mecca together with the first Albanian pilgrims to go in a generation. There he was received by senior Saudi religious authorities and having made the pilgrimage took the title al-Hajj (or Haxhi).

In February 1992, Dede Reshat travelled to the US to visit the Bektashi community of Detroit, where he was received by Baba Rexheb and senior clerics of other faiths. Baba Rexheb was responsible for establishing the first Bektashi Tekke in America in 1954 and for keeping Bektashism alive during the days of communism.

In May 1993, Dede Reshat was received by the late head of Turkey's Bektashi community Bedri Noyan Dede, who organized meetings with senior Bektashi religious leaders in Istanbul and İzmir.

The 6th World Bektashi Congress that was held in 1993 unanimously elected Dede Reshat to the head the Mother Tekke of the Bektashi Sufi Order, and thus he was given the title Dedebaba.

In August of that same year, he visited the tekke/museum of Haji Bektash Veli in Turkey, where thousands of believers from the Asian parts of Turkey, Azerbaijan, Turkestan, and the Middle East came to greet him. The mayor of the town of Hacıbektaş received Dede Reshat with a special lunch of honor.

On every religious holiday from 1991 and until his death, he received Albanian's presidents, prime ministers, speakers of the parliament, as well as ministers and ambassadors of foreign states.

In 1994 and 1995 Dede Reshat visited the Islamic Republic of Iran, where he was received by the highest leader of the Ahl al-Bayt Foundation, Mr. Mir Hosseini and senior religious leaders from Iran, India and Kuwait. In March 2001 Dede Reshat was invited to a special audience with Pope John Paul II at the Vatican, where both men discussed their resistance to communism.

In August 2002, Dede Reshat again travelled to Haji Bektashi in Turkey, where he met with the then Prime Minister of Turkey, Bulent Ecevit, who congratulated him on his role in preserving the Bektash way.

In October 2002, Dede Reshat took part in the International Conference of the Organization for Security and Co-operation in Europe (OSCE), which was held in Azerbaijan. Dede Reshat spoke on behalf of Bektashis worldwide. One year later, he was invited to the Vatican to take part in the canonisation ceremony for Mother Teresa, along with other religious leaders from around the world.

In February 2004, he also took part in the World Conference for Peace and Tolerance which was organized by Partiarkati Ekumenal and the Apel Ndërgjegjes Foundation. His words on their work received a standing ovation. In April 2004, he took part in a symposium held in Germany.

On the occasion of the 7th World Bektashi Congress that was held in October 2005 in Tirana, he hosted the Minister of Culture and Tourism of Turkey, Atilla Koç, as well as the mayors of the Turkish towns of Nevşehir and Hacıbektaş. In December 2005 Dede Reshat was welcomed in Pristina at the Congress of the Albanian World League. He was received by Kosovo's Minister of Culture, Astrit Haraçia.

In May 2006, Dede Reshat received the President of the Governorate of Vatican City State, Cardinal Giovanni Lajolo, at the Mother Tekke in Tirana.

In June 2006, Dede Reshat hosted Turkey's Parliament Speaker, Bülent Arınç at the Mother Tekke in Tirana. He presented Dede Reshat with a plaque from the Turkish Parliament honoring his outstanding service in spreading peace and goodwill. In August 2006, Dede Reshat participated in the eighth World Conference of Religions for Peace held in Kyoto, Japan.

In July 2007, Dede Reshat was received in Pristina by Bernard Kouchner, the French minister of foreign affairs. On the occasion of the rebuilding of the Bektashi tekke in Gjakova. Dede Reshat was hosted by the Head of UN Acting Administration in Kosovo, Joachim Rücker.

In October 2007, at the head a Bektashi delegation, he was received in Istanbul by the highest Islamic authority in Turkey, Imam Ali Bardakoğlu, as well as the mufti of Istanbul, Imam Mustafa Çağrıcı.

In November 2007, he participated in the World Conference on Inter-Religious and Inter-Civilization Dialogue held in Ohrid, Macedonia. He was welcomed to this conference and received there by Nikola Gruevski, Prime Minister of the Republic of Macedonia.

In June 2008, Dede Reshat was invited to Ankara by the supreme mufti of the Republic of Turkey, Imam Ali Bardakoğlu. There he attended the artistic ceremony of the Sufi music ensemble and prayer in the various mosques of Ankara.

Dede Reshat was decorated with the “Beacon of Democracy” medal and Golden Naim Frasheri award by the presidents of the Republic of Albania, and was an honorary resident of the cities of Tirana, Kruja, Kukës, Berat, Kavaja, Bulqiza, Gjirokastra, Mallakastra and others.

In September 2008, Dede Reshat hosted a visit by Turkish Prime Minister Recep Tayyip Erdoğan. On October 13, 2009, he hosted a visit to the Mother Tekke by Noël Kinsella, Speaker of the Canadian Senate, during a visit to Tirana.

== Death ==
Bardhi underwent two heart surgeries in the United States, the first in 2000 and the second in 2004. After months of battling illness and exhaustion, he died shortly after 2:00 pm on 2 April 2011 in Tirana, at the age of 76.

== Bibliography ==
- Elsie, Robert (2019). The Albanian Bektashi: History and Culture of a Dervish Order in the Balkans. Bloomsbury Publishing. ISBN 9781788315715.

Preceded by Ahmet Myftar	Dedebaba; 20 July 1993 – 2 April 2011	Succeeded by Baba Mondi
