= Bektashism and folk religion =

Group of religious beliefs and practices

Folk religious beliefs and practices exist in Bektashism. While Bektashism was originally founded as an Islamic Sufi order, it became widespread in the Ottoman Empire, throughout Anatolia as well as in the Balkans, where it acquired beliefs and practices from many folk religions, mainly of the Albanians and northern Greeks, and also from Anatolian and Balkan Eastern Orthodox Christians and Gnostics, and therefore Bektashism became a syncretic and perennialist Sufi order. The other Balkan and Anatolian religious communities, such as Christians also had this habit of acquiring folk religious beliefs and practices.
