= Baba (Alevism) =

In Alevism, a baba is religious leader related to a dede in Sufism.

== List of notable babas ==
- Arabati Baba Teḱe
- Demir Baba Teke
- Gül Baba
- Otman Baba

== See also ==
- Bektashi Dedebabate
