= Luz i Madh =

- Village
- Location within Albania
- Coordinates: 41°6′30″N 19°34′58″E
- Country: Albania
- County: Tirana
- Municipality: Rrogozhinë
- Administrative unit: Lekaj
- Time zone: UTC+1 (CET)
  - Summer (DST): UTC+2 (CEST)
- Postal Code: 2507
- Area Code: 055

Luz i Madh is a village located in the central plains of Albania's Western Lowlands region. It is part of Tirana County. Following the 2015 local government reform, it became part of the municipality of Rrogozhinë.

== See also ==
- Baba Faja Martaneshi
