= Balım Sultan =

Sufi who established the Bektashi Order

The turbe of Balim Sultan is within the Haji Bektash Complex of Nevshehir

Balım Sultan (d. circa 1517/1519) was a Turcoman Bektashi sufi who established and codified the Bektashi Order at the beginning of the 16th century. The mystical practices and rituals of the Bektashi were systematized and structured by Balım, after which many of the order's distinct practices and beliefs took shape. He is considered the primary personality in the Bektashi Order after Hacı Bektaş-ı Veli (Haji Bektash) and is regarded as the “Second Pir” (pīr-e ṯānī or second elder).

== Overview ==
Balım Sultan was born in 1457 in the town of Didymoteichon (also shortened to Dimetoka) in the Ottoman province of Rumelia, in present day Eastern Macedonia and Thrace in northeasetern Greece. It is possible that his father was a Turkoman Shi'i Muslim like his mother, although the sources are not clear as to whether she herself was of Turkoman settler, local Pomak, or Greek Muslim convert origin. The genealogy of Balım is a contested matter, but most versions seek to link him to the miraculously begotten sons of Ḥājī Bektāš, Ḥabīb and Ḵeżr Lāla, as a reinforcement of his spiritual descent from the founding elder of the order. It is also widely suggested that his father was Mursel Baba and his mother was an Iranian/Persian princess.

He was a follower of a Bektashi convent in northeastern Greece before being appointed by sultan Bayezid II to the Pīr Evi, the mother tekke in Sulucakarahöyük (near Kırşehir) in 1501. The convents, which spread in town and villages, were centralized during his appointment. The order was also institutionalized through ceremonies and religious functions under Balïm. He died between 1517 and 1519. His tomb is located in the Haci Bektashi Veli Complex in Nevşehir Province, Turkey.

== Impact on the Bektashi Order ==
Balïm is credited as initiating the use of twelve candles and associated paraphernalia in rituals and ceremonies; introduction of the Palihenk, a large symbolic stone with twelve flutings worn around the neck; and the fixing of a rank hierarchy led by a celibate dervish (mücerred). From the time of Balïm onward, the Bektāšīya consisted of two mutually antagonistic branches; the Mücerred or Babagan branch, founded by Balïm and presided over by a celibate dervish; and the Çelebî branch, led by other presumed descendants of Ḥabīb and Ḵeżr Lāla. The Mücerred branch was generally dominant, and from the time of Sersem-ʿAlī Sultan (d. 1569-70), all Bektāšī tekkas were under the control of a supreme celibate elder resident at the central shrine (pirevi) in the hamlet of Hacıbektaş near Kırşehir in central Anatolia.

Ranks in the hierarchy established to Balïm were the following: ʿāšeq, moḥebb, darvīš, bābā, ḵalīfa, and mojarrad. The ʿāšeq was the aspirant to entry; once accepted, he was termed a moḥebb. If he advanced to the rank of darvīš, he would be told to let his beard grow, be given the Bektāšī tāj to wear, and be assigned one of several menial tasks in the tekka. The oldest Bektāšī tekkas often had land attached to them, so working the land was among the tasks performed by darvīš. The bābā was the Bektāšī equivalent of shaykh, responsible for the welfare of the tekka residents. The rank of bābā was awarded by a ḵalīfa to a darvīš selected by him or, occasionally, to a moḥebb. Although the chief function of the bābā was to train darvīšes and moḥebbs for further advancement, he could not himself promote them to the rank of bābā, this being the prerogative of the ḵalīfa.
