= Xhafer Sadik =

Religious leader

Dede Xhafer Sadik
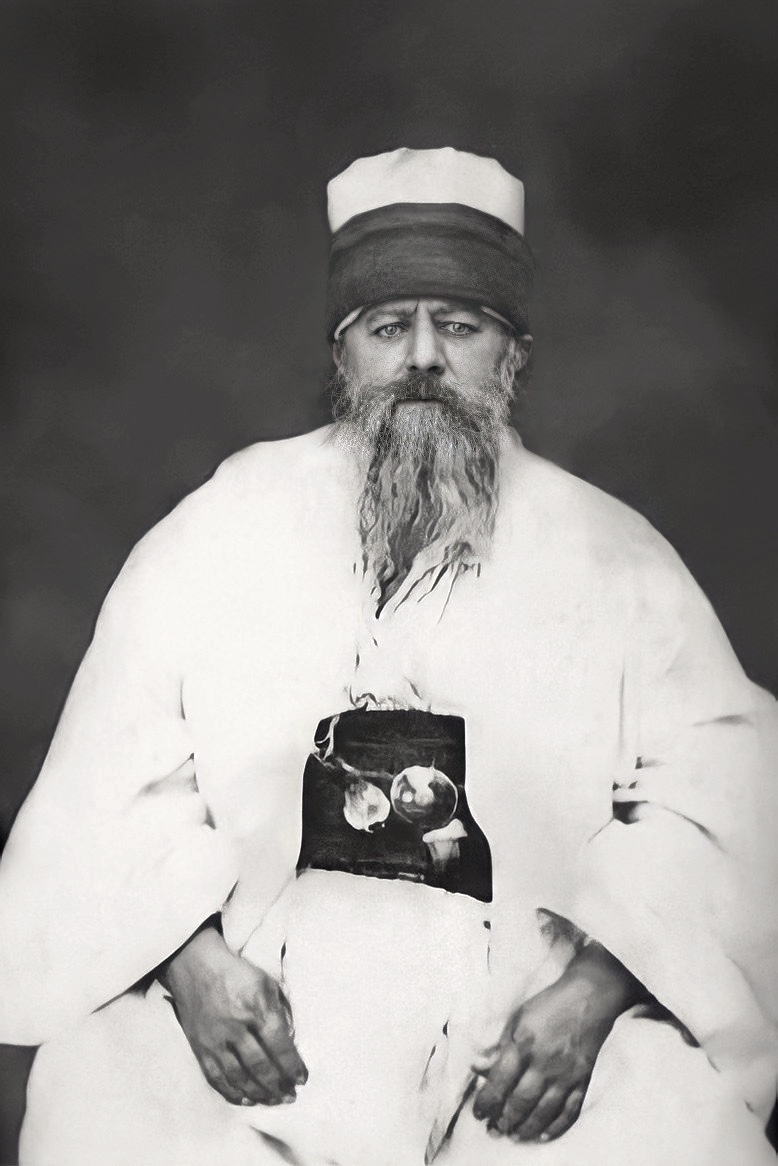
- 1945 photograph of Xhafer Sadik

4th Bektashi Dedebaba
- In office 5 May 1945 – 2 August 1945
- Preceded by: Kamber Ali
- Succeeded by: Abaz Hilmi

Personal life
- Born: 1874 Ergiri, Ottoman Empire
- Died: 2 August 1945 (aged 70–71) Albania

Religious life
- Religion: Islam
- Order: Bektashi Order

Xhafer Sadik (Xhaferr Sadik Dede or Xhafer Sadiku; 1874 – 2 August 1945) was the 4th Dedebaba (or Kryegjysh) of the Bektashi Order. He served as Dedebaba for only 3 months during the summer of 1945.

== Biography ==
Baba Xhafer Sadik was born in 1882 in Ergiri, Ottoman Empire (today Gjirokastër, Albania). He served as a dervish under Baba Shemsi of the tekke of İzmir in Turkey. He also served at the tekke of Përmet and was appointed as the baba (leader) of the tekke in 1920 by Baba Ahmet of Turan.

During World War II, he led a small group of pro-Communist fighters in the Dangëllia region. Due to his pro-Communist affiliations, the Communists preferred Xhafer Sadik over Abaz Hilmi, who was highly conservative and resisted liberal reforms proposed by the Communists. As such, he was appointed by the Communist regime to preside over the Fourth National Congress of the Bektashi that was held in 1945 in Tirana. Baba Xhafer died on 2 August 1945.

Preceded by Kamber Ali	Dedebaba; 5 May 1945 - 2 August 1945	Succeeded by Abaz Hilmi
