= Kamber Ali =

Dedebaba of the Bektashians in 1944

Dede Kamber Ali
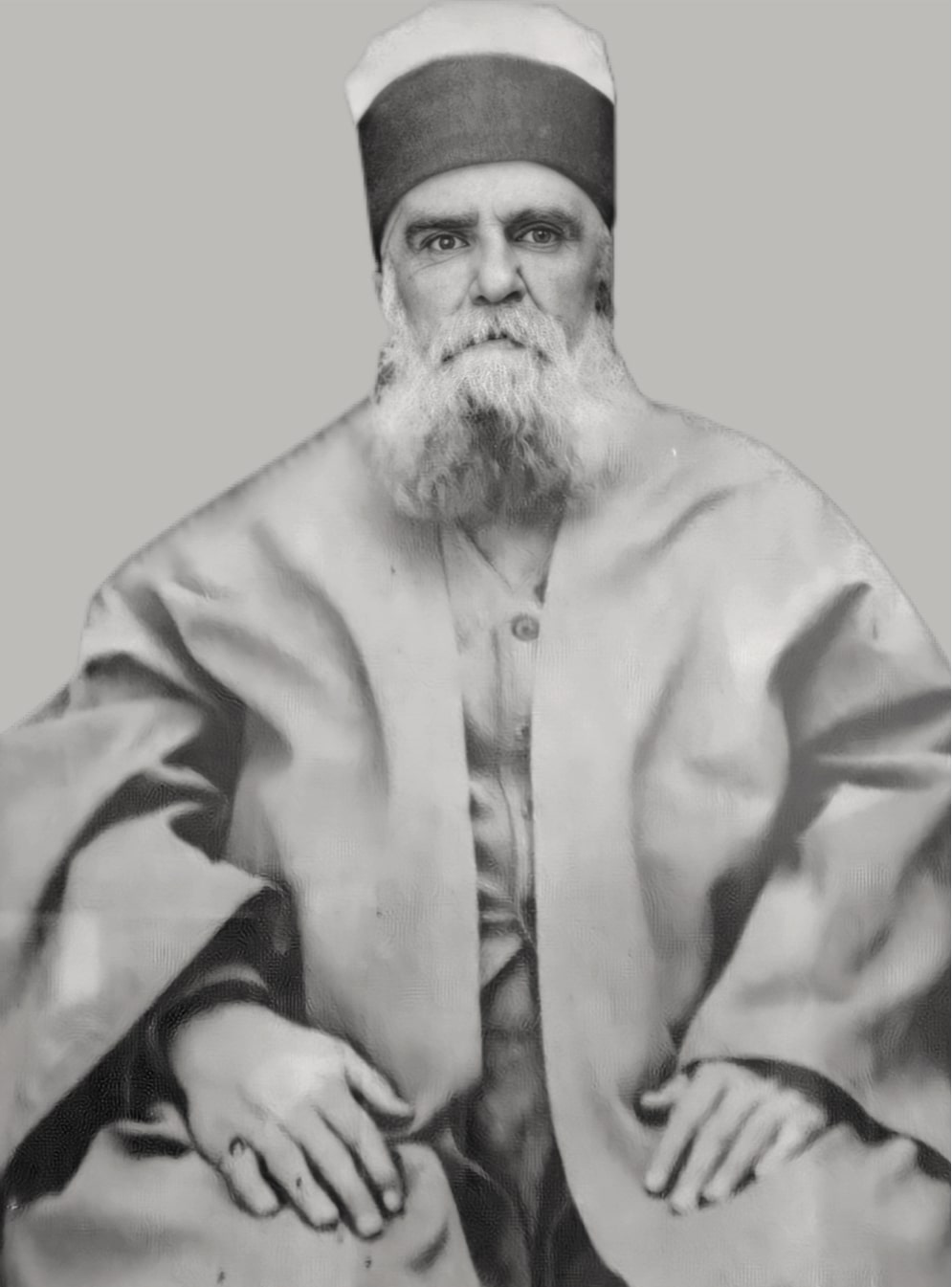
- 1945 photograph of Kamber Ali Dede

3rd Bektashi Dedebaba
- In office 12 April 1944 – 1945
- Preceded by: Ali Riza
- Succeeded by: Xhafer Sadik

Personal life
- Born: 1869 Pagria, near Permedi, Sanjak of Yanina, Ottoman Empire (today Albania)
- Died: 5 April 1950 (aged 80–81) Tirana, Albania

Religious life
- Religion: Islam
- Order: Bektashi Order

Kamber Ali (1869–1950) was the 3rd Dedebaba of the Bektashi Order. He served as Dedebaba for only several months in 1944, and was arrested by the Communists in December 1944 since he had fought for the Balli Kombëtar. He died in prison in Tirana in 1950.

== Biography ==
=== Early life ===
Kamber Ali was born in 1869 (or 1870) in the village of Pagria, located near Përmet, Albania, which was then under the Ottoman Empire. He served as a dervish under Baba Abedin in Frashër. Kamber Ali was also an active part of the Albanian National Awakening and taught Albanian in the Skrapar, Përmet, and Tomorrica regions. In 1910, Kamber Ali, Ahmet Turani, and Sulejman of Gjirokastra were each appointed as gjysh (baba) by Fejzi Dede at the pir evi of Haji Bektash Veli in Hacıbektaş, central Anatolia.

=== World War I exile and return to Albania ===
During the Greek occupation of World War I, Kamber Ali fled to Candia (Heraklion) in Crete, and then went on to the United States in 1916. While in the United States, he campaigned to raise funds for the tekkes among the Albanian Americans. In 1919 or 1920, he returned to Albania to help rebuild the tekkes destroyed during World War I. The year after that, he became the baba of Prishta and of Suka, succeeding Baba Hysen after his death. Kamber Ali was one of the main organizers of the first three National Congresses of the Bektashi.

=== World War II ===
In November 1942, he joined the Balli Kombëtar, an anti-Communist resistance movement. While in the Balli Kombëtar, he was closely associated with Ali bey Këlcyra, one of the leaders of the movement.

Baba Kamber Ali was elected kryegjysh of the Bektashi community on 12 April 1944, succeeding Ali Riza Dede.

=== Arrest and death ===
In December 1944, at the age of 74, Kamber Ali was arrested by the Communists was sentenced to life in prison due to his participation in the Balli Kombëtar. He died on 5 April 1950 in the Tirana prison hospital.

== Tyrbe ==
The remains of Kamber Ali are now buried in a tyrbe at the World Headquarters of the Bektashi (Albanian: Kryegjyshata) in Tirana.

Preceded by Ali Riza	Dedebaba; 12 April 1944 - 1945	Succeeded by Xhafer Sadik
