= Melçan =

- Village
- Location within Albania
- Coordinates: 40°38′51″N 20°43′23″E
- Country: Albania
- County: Korçë
- Municipality: Korçë
- Administrative unit: Qendër Bulgarec
- Time zone: UTC+1 (CET)
  - Summer (DST): UTC+2 (CEST)

Melçan is a community in the Korçë County, Albania. At the 2015 local government reform it became part of the municipality Korçë.

== History ==
During the 1920s, when the Bektashi Order and its headquarters in Hacıbektaş, Turkey were banned, the tekke of Melçan served as the first de facto headquarters of the Albanian Bektashi community until the World Headquarters of the Bektashi was officially set up in Tirana in 1930.

== See also ==
- Bajo Topulli
