= Ahmet Myftar =

Religious leader

Dede Ahmet Myftar
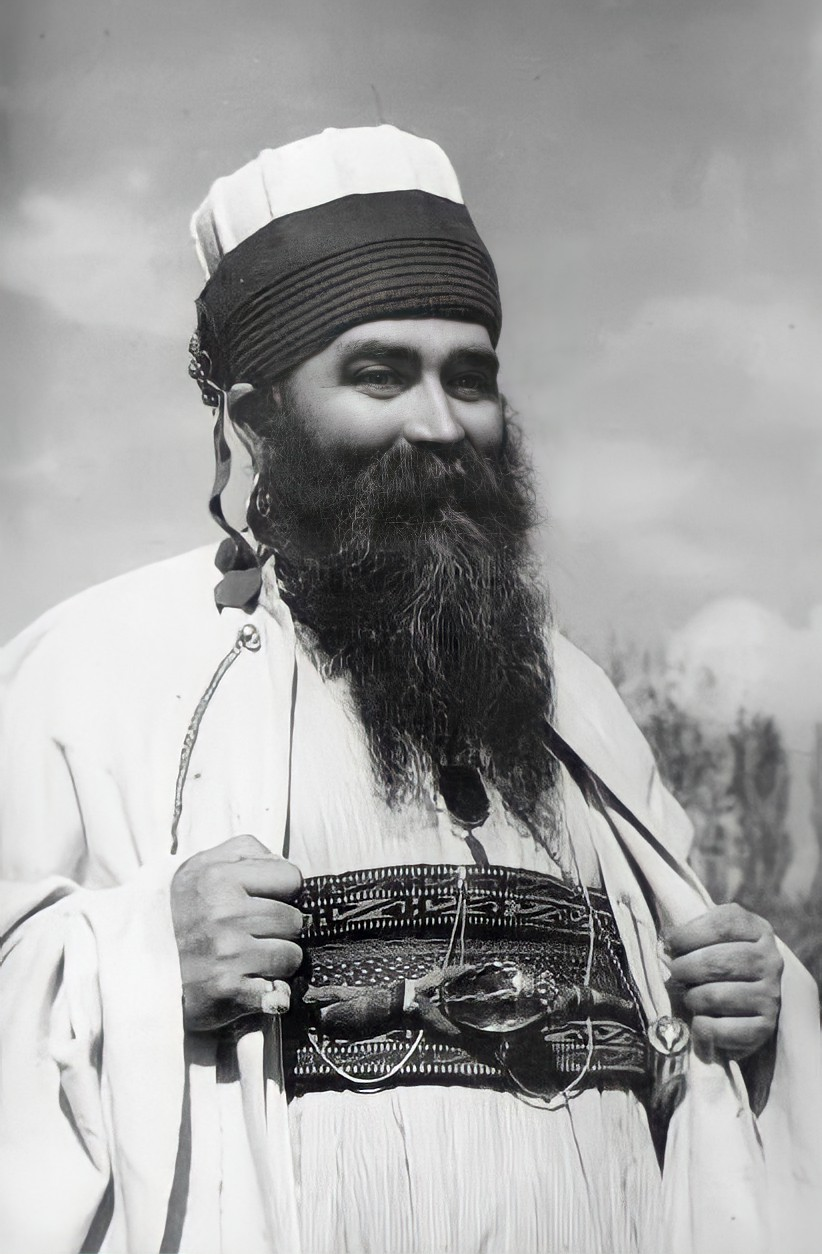
- 1947 photograph of Ahmet Myftar

6th Bektashi Dedebaba
- In office 8 June 1947 – 1958
- Preceded by: Abaz Hilmi
- Succeeded by: Reshat Bardhi

Personal life
- Born: 22 February 1916 Brataj, Albania
- Died: 10 July 1980 (aged 64) Albania

Religious life
- Religion: Islam
- Order: Bektashi Order

Ahmet Myftar Dede (also known as Ahmet Myftari or Ahmet Myftar Ahmataj, 1916–1980) was the 6th Dedebaba (or Kryegjysh) of the Bektashi Order in Islamic Sufi mysticism. He was the final dedebaba to have served during the People's Socialist Republic of Albania.

== Biography ==
=== Early years ===
Ahmet Myftar was born in Brataj, Albania, about 40 km southeast of Vlora. From in 1924 to 1929, he attended school in Vlora.

In 1937, he was stationed in the Dibra region as part of his military service. There, at the tekke of Bllaca, he became a dervish under Baba Zenel, residing in Bllaca until 1939. He then served in Elbasan and Turan, near Tepelena.

=== World War II ===
Ahmet Myftar returned to Vlora in 1942 and wanted to build a new tekke in Brataj, the village where he was born. However, World War II completely halted his plans, and from 1942 to May 1944, he was a pro-Communist fighter. He was subsequently interned (i.e., imprisoned in a forced labor camp) in Durrës. After the war, He served as a baba in Vlora from October 1945 to 1948 at the tekke of Kusum Baba.

=== Appointment as Dedebaba ===
After the murder-suicide of Abaz Hilmi in March 1948, Ahmet Myftar was appointed Dedebaba of the Bektashi Order on 8 June 1948 by the Communist regime, essentially serving as a puppet for the government. In 1958, he was no longer allowed to serve as Dedebaba as the Communist government continued to remove religion from public Albanian life.

=== Final years ===
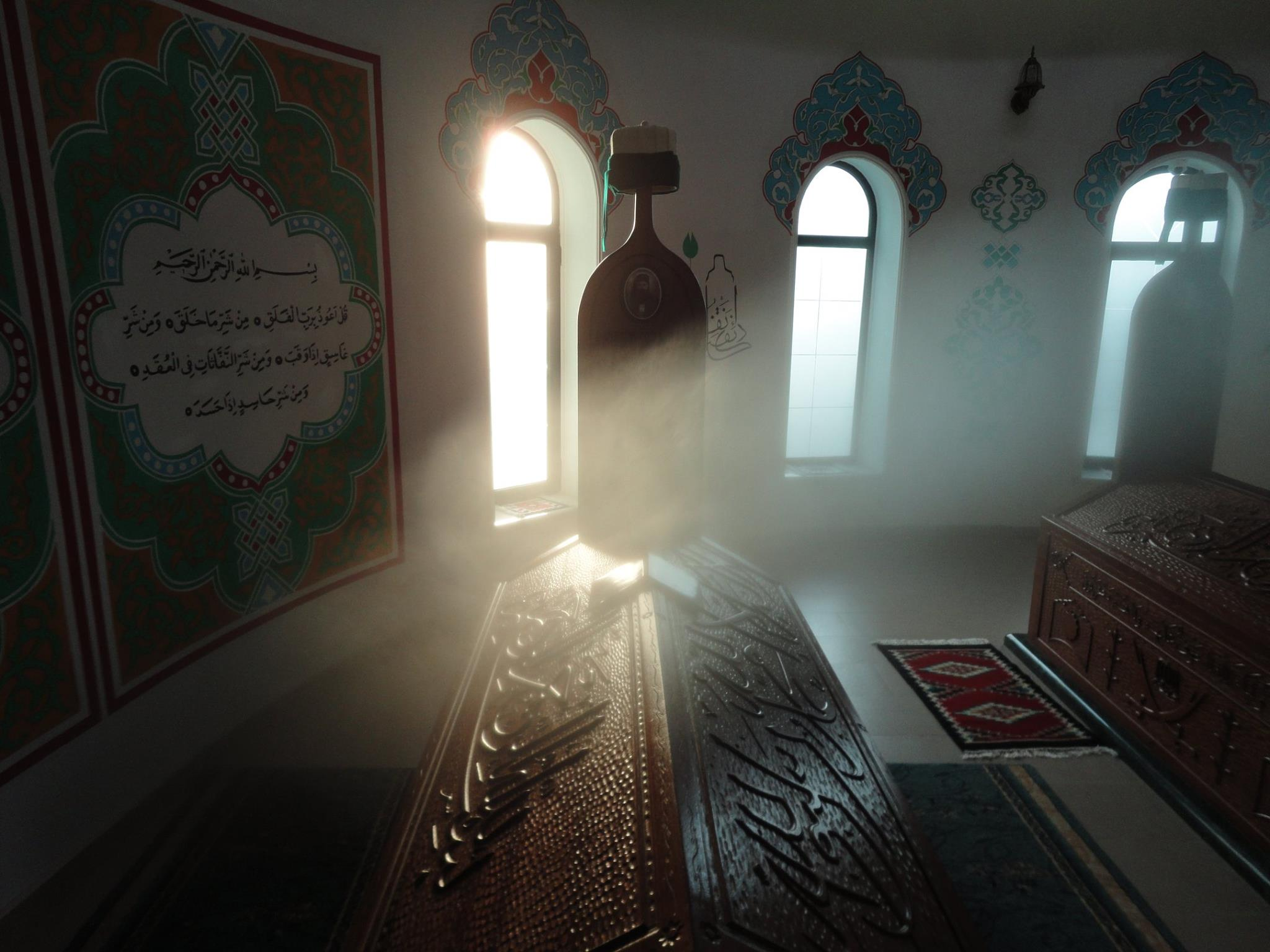
The tyrbe of Ahmet Myftar Dede at the World Headquarters of the Bektashi in Tirana, Albania

From around 1958 to 1967, he was interned in Drizar, Mallakastra together with Reshat Bardhi, one of his dervish disciples who would later go on to become the 7th Dedebaba of the Bektashi Order. Finally, the Bektashi Order was completely banned in 1967 under the dictatorship of Enver Hoxha, forcing the retirement of Ahmet Myftar from public life. He spent his final years in Kruja and Tirana under constant surveillance from the Sigurimi (the Albanian secret police), and died in 1980.

== Tyrbe ==
His remains are currently buried in a tyrbe (mausoleum or holy grave) at the World Headquarters of the Bektashi (Albanian: Kryegjyshata) in Tirana, Albania.

Preceded by Abaz Hilmi	Dedebaba; 1947-1958	Succeeded by Reshat Bardhi
