= World Headquarters of the Bektashi =

Cultural heritage monument in Albania

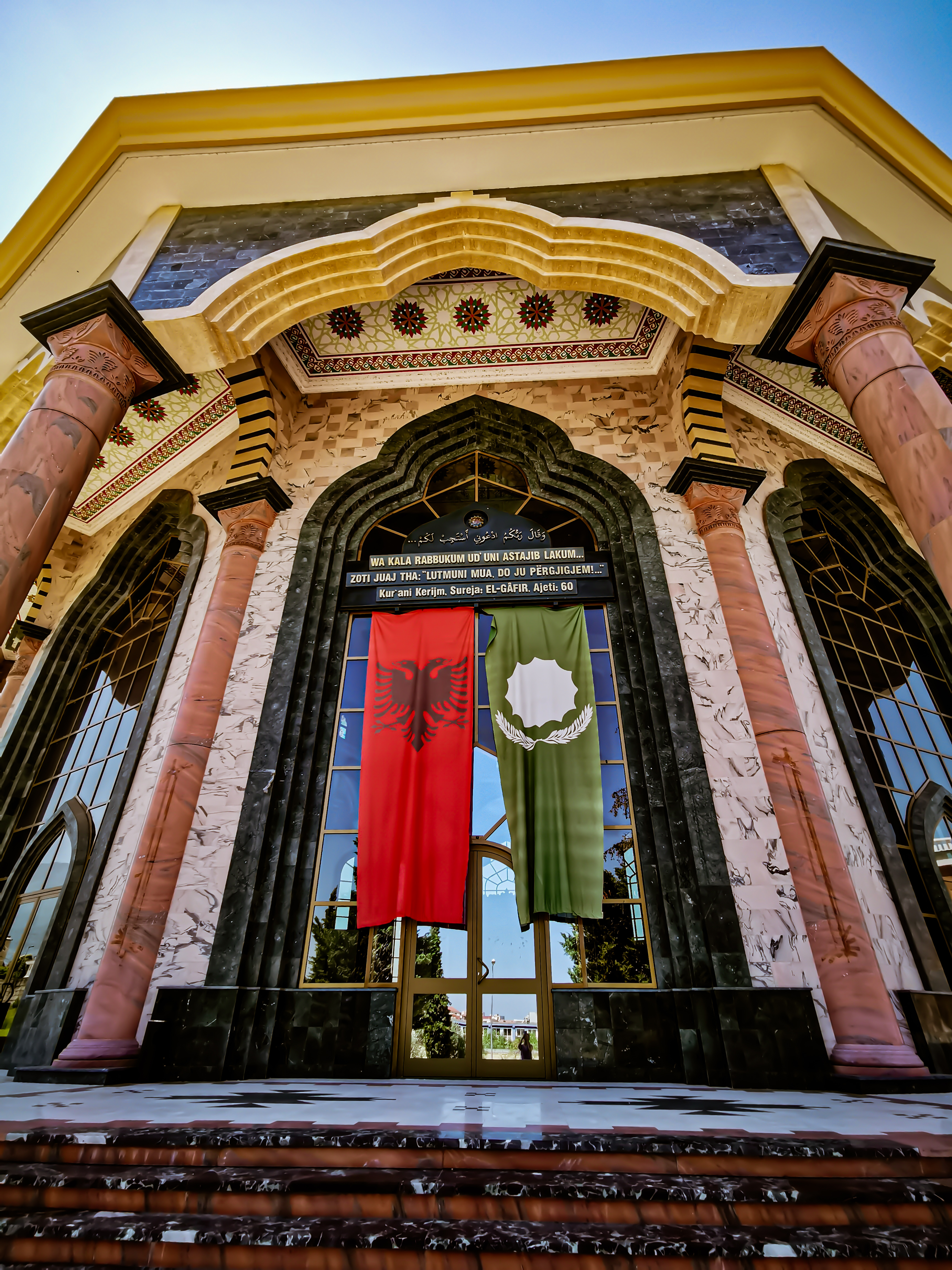

- Location within Albania

Religion
- Affiliation: Islam
- Rite: Bektashi Order
- Year consecrated: 1930

Location
- Municipality: Tirana
- Country: Albania
- Interactive map of World Headquarters of the Bektashi
- Coordinates: 41.3313°N 19.8494°E

Architecture
- Founder: Sali Njazi

Website
- kryegjyshataboterorebektashiane.org

The World Headquarters of the Bektashi or Bektashi World Center (Albanian: Kryegjyshata Botërore Bektashiane; often simply known in Albanian as the Kryegjyshata) is the international headquarters of the Bektashi Order, a Sufi order. It is located on Dhimitër Kamarda Street at the eastern edge of Tirana, the capital of Albania. It serves as the centre of the Albanian Bektashi Order. The site is proposed to form the territory of the Sovereign State of the Bektashi Order. The headquarters also has a museum, library, and archive.

There is a possibility that the Albanian government will be granting territorial sovereignty to the Bektashi Order, which will be a "theocratic microstate" much like Vatican City, but smaller. This state would allow alcohol and permit women to dress as they wish, showcasing the Bektashi as a moderate branch of Islam.

== History ==
Before the secularization of Turkey in 1925, the Haji Bektash Veli Complex in Hacıbektaş, Turkey was home to the pir evi (Turkish for "pir's house") of Haji Bektash Veli, which served as the international headquarters of the Bektashi Order. Atatürk's 1925 ban on all dervish orders caused the exodus of the Bektashi Order to Albania in 1925, and the complex was closed for religious use. As a result, the administrative seat of the Bektashi Order was shifted to the World Headquarters of the Bektashi in Tirana, Albania in 1930.

In 1930, Sali Njazi, the 1st Dedebaba of the Bektashi Order, established the World Headquarters of the Bektashi movement (Albanian: Kryegjyshata) in Tirana. Sali Njazi had originally planned to set up the headquarters in Melçan, Korça (which had served as the first de facto headquarters of the Albanian Bektashi community during the 1920s), but finally decided to build it in Tirana instead. The construction of the headquarters was finished in 1941 during the Italian occupation of Albania.

The headquarters were closed in 1967, when Albanian Communist dictator Enver Hoxha shut down all religious organizations. On November 1990, a temporary committee for the resurrection of the Bektashi Community was established in Tirana. Since that year, the new community has worked hard to revive the traditions of Bektashism in Albania. The World Headquarters in Tirana was officially reopened on 11 July 1992 on Sultan Nevruz.

On 21 September 2024, it was reported that Edi Rama, the Prime Minister of Albania, was planning to create the Sovereign State of the Bektashi Order, a sovereign microstate for the Order with the Bektashi Headquarters serving as the nation's only territory.

== Headquarters campus ==
The tyrbes (holy tombs) of several dedebabas, including Kamber Ali, Abaz Hilmi, and Ahmet Myftar, are buried at the Headquarters. On 7 February 2015, the Bektashi Museum and the Bektashi Library were inaugurated. The archives contain many historic documents in various languages such as Albanian, Arabic, Ottoman Turkish, English, French, and Italian, with the earliest document dating back to 1847. There are also photograph collections, audio tapes, and microfilms. The audio collection preserves rare recordings of Bektashi musical traditions.

== See also ==
- List of Bektashi tekkes and shrines
