= Arabati Baba Teḱe =

Bektashi Muslim place of worship in Tetovo, North Macedonia

Arabati Baba Tekke
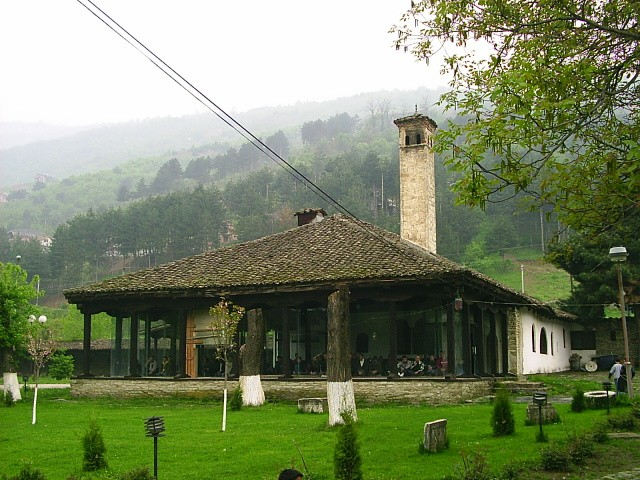

Religion
- Affiliation: Bektashi
- Ownership: Bektashi Community of Macedonia
- Leadership: Bektashi Community of Macedonia

Location
- Location: Tetovo, North Macedonia
- Municipality: Tetovo
- Interactive map of Arabati Baba Tekke
- Coordinates: 42.004109°N 20.957567°E

Architecture
- Architect: Harabati Baba
- Type: Tekke
- Style: Ottoman architecture
- Founder: Sersem Ali Dede Baba
- Completed: 1538; 488 years ago
- Materials: Stones & Kalkan

The Arabati Baba Tekḱe (Macedonian: Арабати баба-теќе, Albanian: Teqeja e Baba Harabatit, Turkish: Harabati Baba Tekkesi) is an Ottoman-era takya located in Tetovo, North Macedonia. The tekke was originally built in 1538 around the türbe of dervish Sersem Ali Baba. In 1799, a waqf provided by Recep Paşa established the current grounds of the tekke. The monks claim the tower was the last home of a high-ranking Albanian named Roxalana, who died of tuberculosis there. According to a more popular theory, it was part of the monastery's defence system, founded in the 16th Century.

Due to its striking architecture, the Arabati Baba Tekke has become an iconic symbol of Tetovo, and is featured on its municipal coat of arms.

== History ==
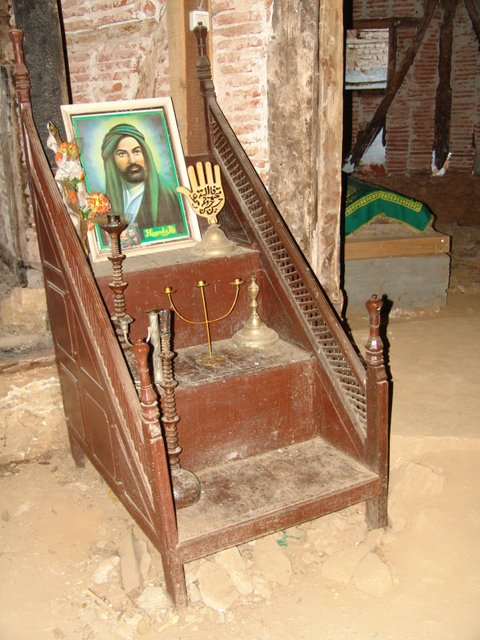
Harabati Baba Tekkesi, Tetovo.

=== Arabati Baba controversy ===
In 2002, a group of armed members of the Salafist, Islamic Community of Macedonia (ICM), the legally recognized organization which claims to represent all Muslims in Macedonia, invaded the Arabati Baba Tekke in an attempt to reclaim the tekke as a mosque, although the facility has never functioned as such. Subsequently, the Bektashi community of Macedonia has sued the Macedonian government for failing to restore the tekke to the Bektashi community, pursuant to a law passed in the early 1990s returning property previously nationalised under the Yugoslav government. The law, however, deals with restitution to private citizens, rather than religious communities. The ICM claim to the tekke is based upon their contention to represent all Muslims in Macedonia; and indeed, they are one of two Muslim organizations recognized by the government, both Sunni. The (Shi'i) Bektashi community filed for recognition as a separate religious community with the Macedonian government in 1993, but the Macedonian government has refused to recognize them.

In March 2008, there were reports that the ICM members squatting on the facility grounds have taken control of additional buildings, have been intimidating visitors to the tekke, and have discharged their weapons on the grounds.

== Gallery ==
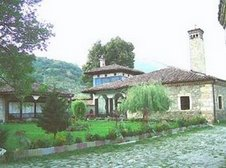
The Harabati Baba Tekke, a traditionally Bektashi Sufi lodge

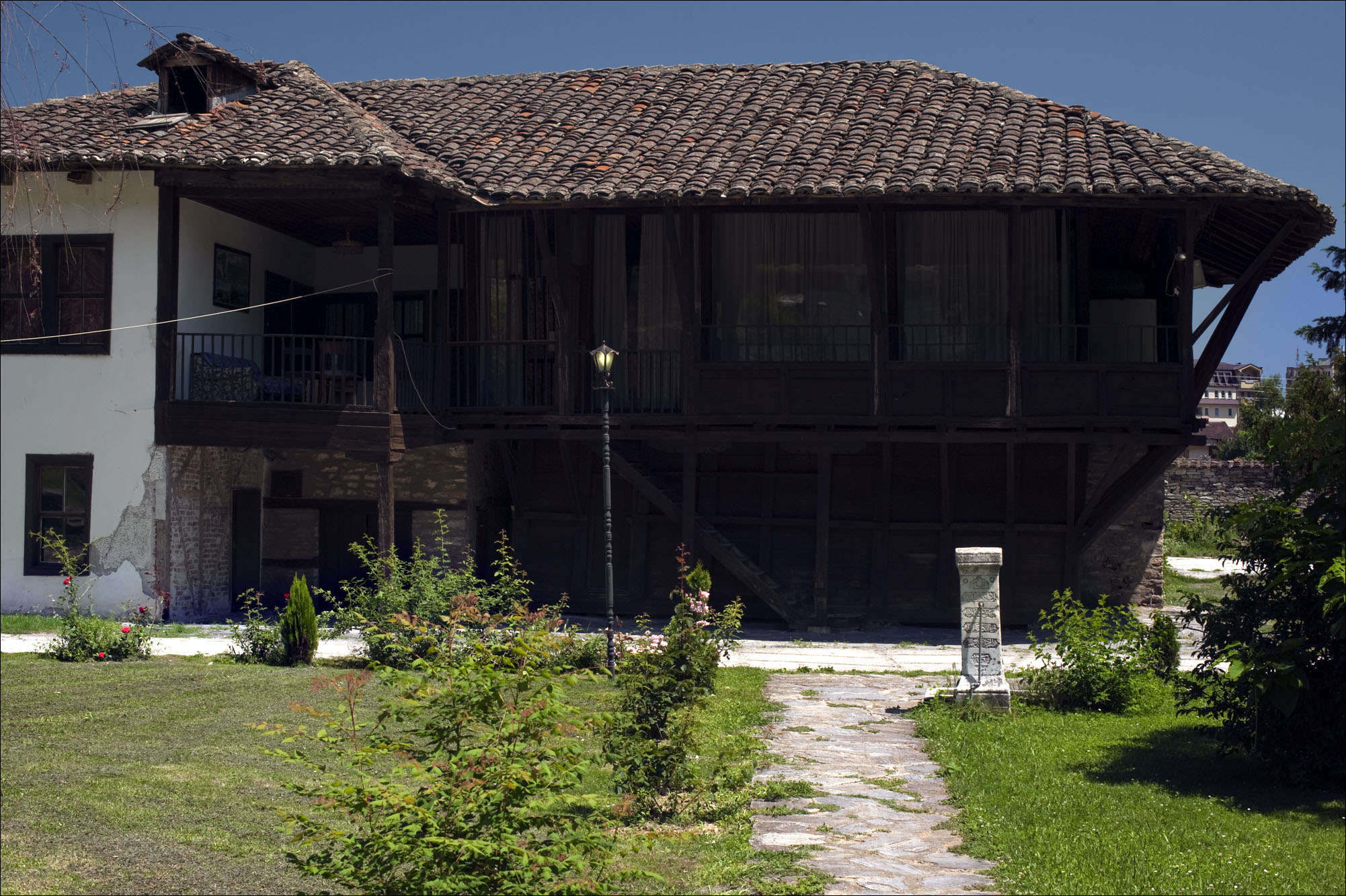
Arabati Baba Teḱe

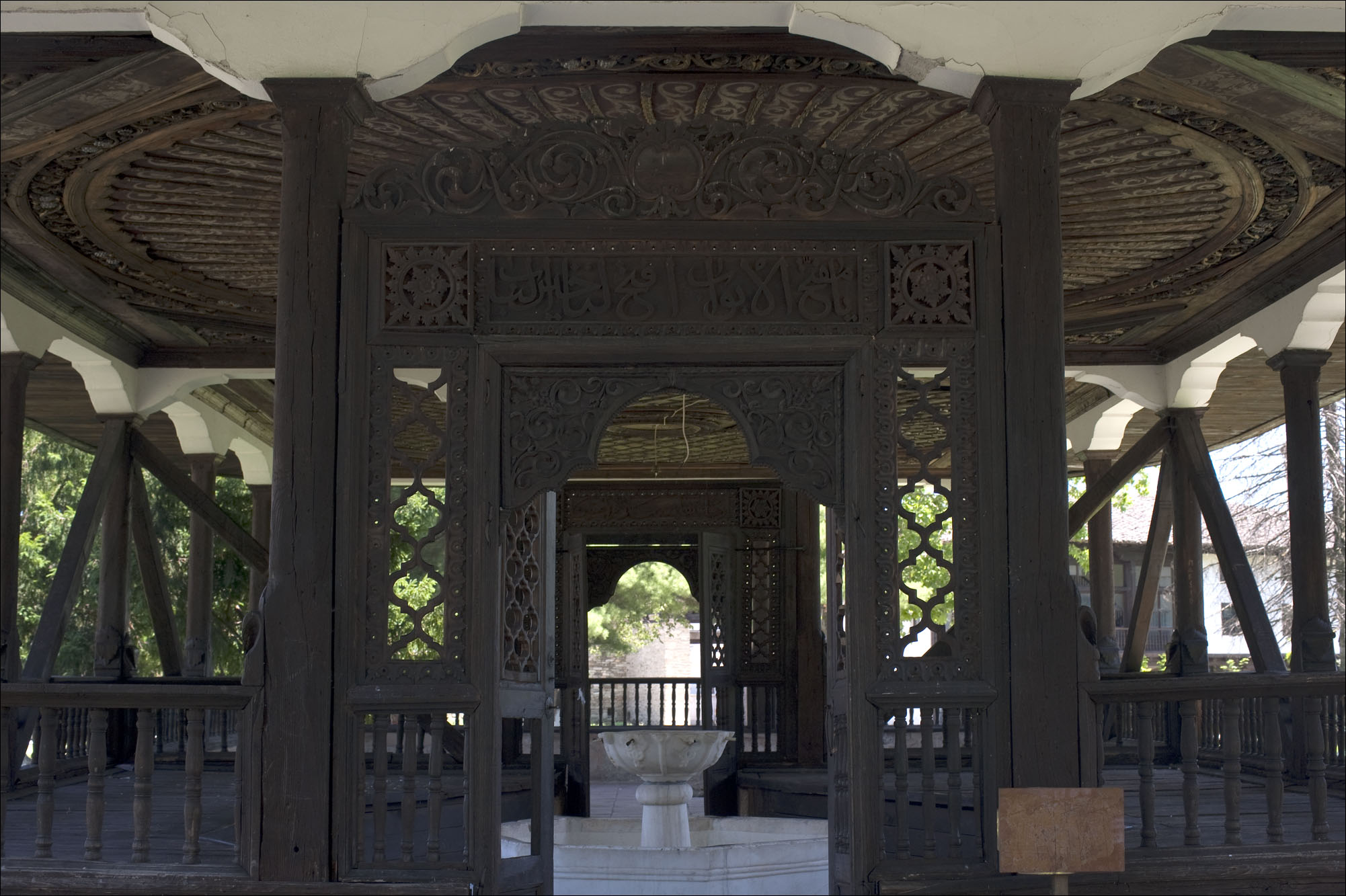
Shadervan of Arabati Baba Teḱe

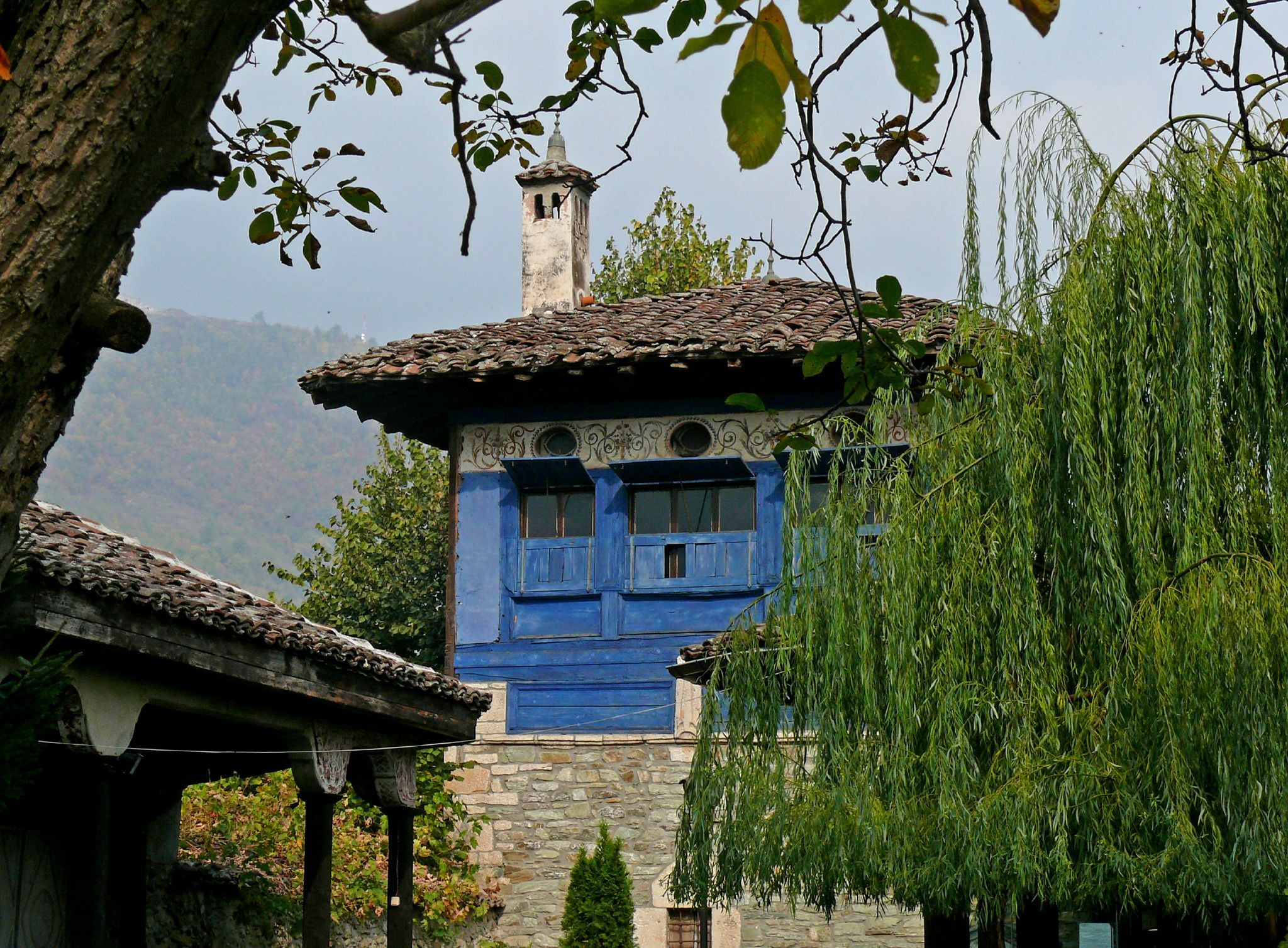
Arabati Baba Teḱe

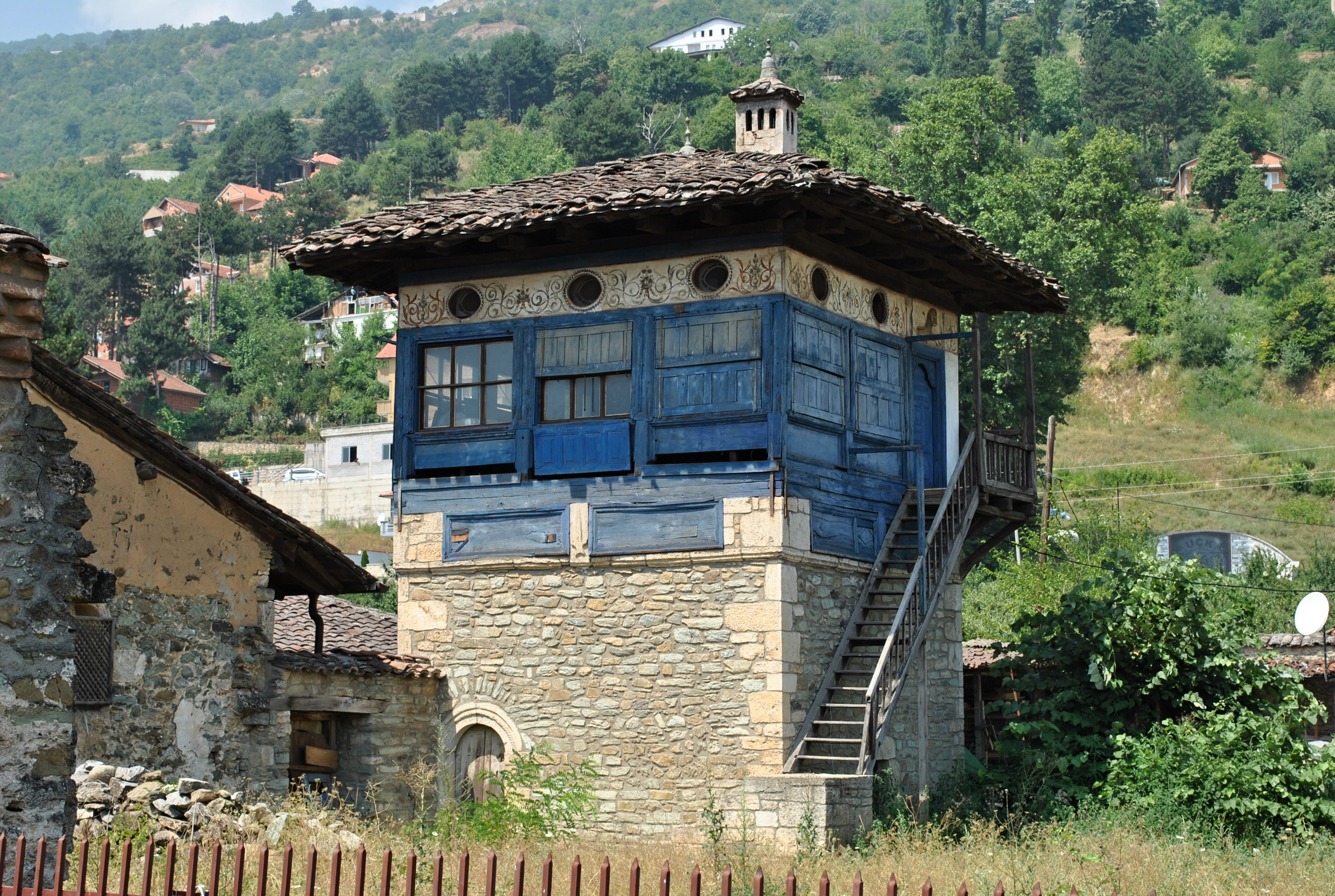
The house of Fatima daughter of Rexhep Pasha in Arabati Baba Tekke

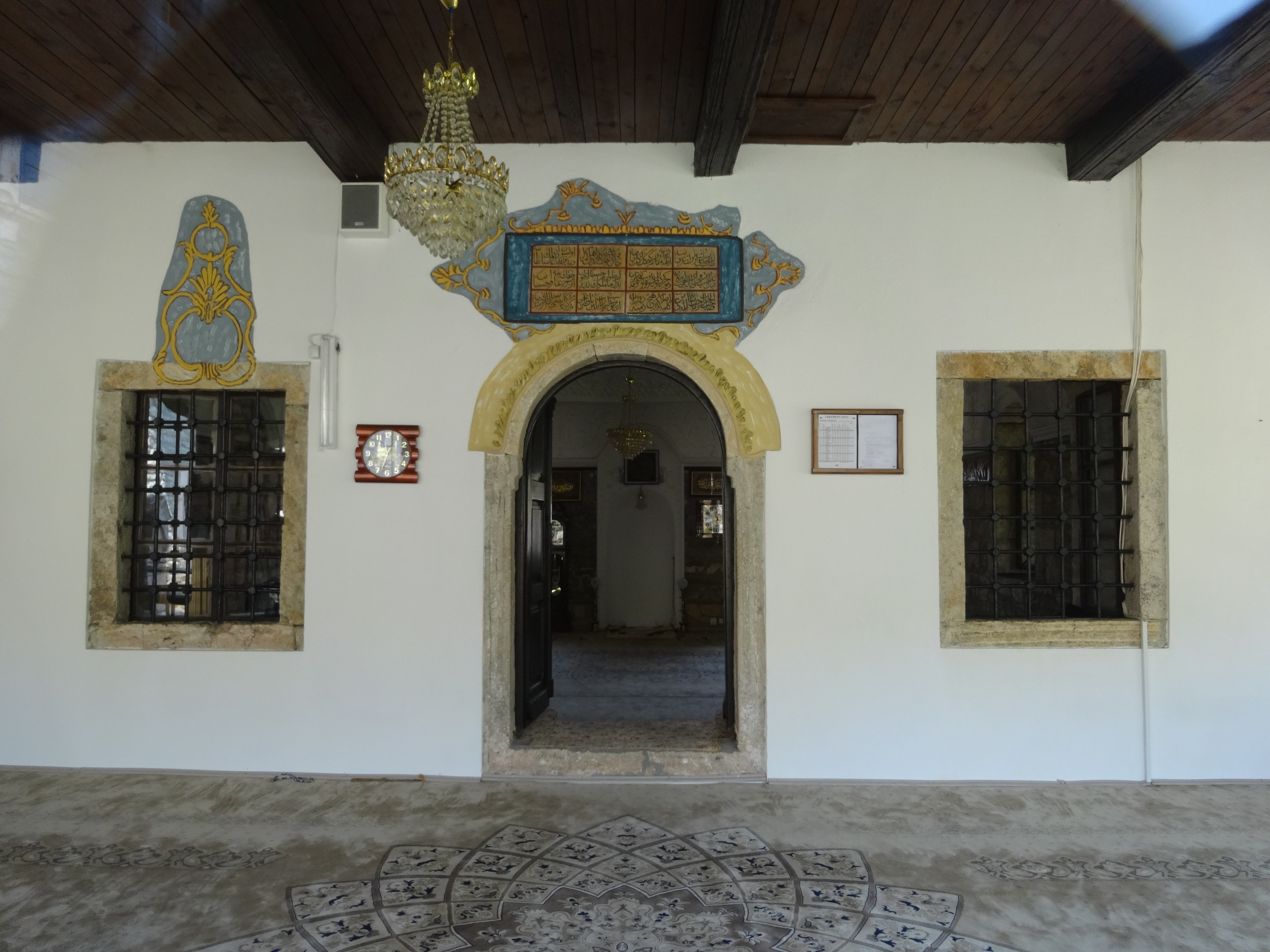
Mejdan of Arabati Baba Tekke.

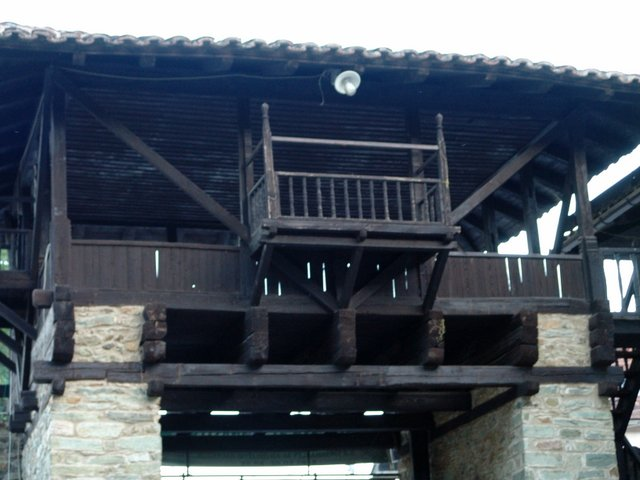
The entry of Arabati Baba Tekke

== See also ==
- Dergah
- Zawiyya
- Alevi
