= Baba Faja Martaneshi =

Albanian Bektashi baba (Sufi) and resistance leader

Mustafa Xhani
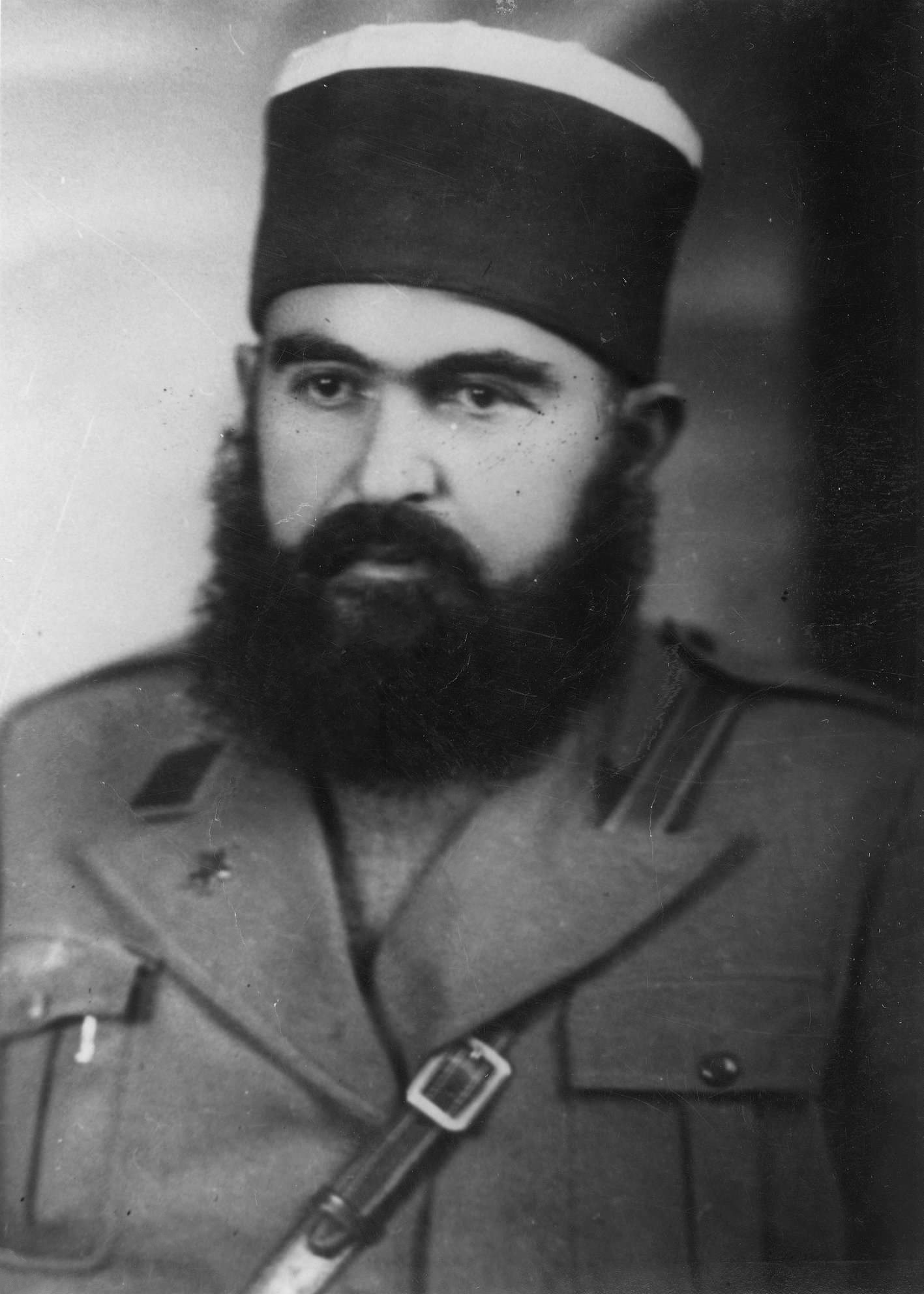
- Martaneshi in 1944
- Born: 1910; Luz i Madh, Kavajë, Sanjak of Durrës, Ottoman Empire (modern Albania)
- Died: 18 March 1947 (age 37); Tirana, PR Albania
- Cause of death: Assassinated
- Known for: Resistance leader during the National Liberation War of the Albanian People.
- Awards: Hero of the People

Baba Faja Martaneshi (1910 - 18 March 1947) was an Albanian Bektashi baba (Sufi) and a resistance leader during the National Liberation War of the Albanian People.

== Biography ==
Baba Faja was born Mustafa Xhani in Luz i Madh, Kavajë. He pursued religious studies to become a baba at the tekke of Martanesh, where he acquired the religious name he would become popularly known by. Following the Italian invasion of Albania he led one of the earliest guerrilla bands against the occupiers, denouncing Fascist Italy as anti-Islamic and establishing contacts with the Albanian communist movement, becoming one of the most wanted men in the country in the process. In his memoirs Enver Hoxha wrote that during the war the Baba was "one of those clergy men who wore the cap and the cloak of a dervish, but who had Albania in his heart and in his hand the rifle for its liberation. . . . [he] did not discard his clerical cap and robe, and he was quite right, because in this way he rendered even greater service to the line of the Party and the National Liberation Front for uniting everybody in the war without distinction as to region, or political and religious beliefs." David Smiley described Baba Faja as a likable "scoundrel," who "delighted in singing partisan songs in his deep bass voice, especially after consuming large quantities of raki."

He became a founding member of the National Liberation Front upon its establishment in September 1942, serving on its General Council alongside Enver Hoxha, Myslym Peza and other resistance fighters, and in July 1943 he became a member of the General Staff of the Albanian National Liberation Army. In May 1944 he was elected a Vice-Chairman of the Standing Committee of the Anti-Fascist National Liberation Council. After the war he served as a representative from Elbasan in the Constituent Assembly, subsequently becoming Deputy Chairman of the Presidium of the People's Assembly.

During the war he asked Hoxha to admit him as a member of the Communist Party; Hoxha supported this move and added "I am sure that you do not believe in religion but believe only in the Party." To this Baba Faja said, "For the Party I shall discard my clerical robes," to which Hoxha replied, "No, you should stick to the robes you wear. This is not a matter of deceiving people, but you wore the religious robes as a priest before the war and before the formation of the Party. Therefore, go on wearing them, because we have to respect the sentiments of believers and utilize the sympathy which the people have for you and the tekke of Martanesh. So, since you are resolutely for the war and love the Party, respect and apply its line, we will admit you as member of the Party." He was subsequently made a member.

In May 1945 he presided over the Fourth Congress of the Bektashi Community, which formally severed relations between the sect and the rest of the Islamic world. As the most prominent Bektashi figure to work with the Communists he led reformers within the sect who advocated allowing the clergy to marry, allowing them to shave their beards and to limit the wearing of religious clothing to ceremonies. On March 18, 1947 the conservative head of the sect, Abaz Hilmi, was confronted by Baba Faja and Baba Fejzo Dervishi (a like-minded reformer) who demanded he accept these policies or else face reprisals from the government. Hilmi then proceeded to shoot both men and commit suicide.
