= Bektashi Dedebabate =

Religious leadership of Bektashi Islam

Bektashi Dedebabate is the religious leadership of Bektashi Islam. The term Dedebaba comes from Turkish and means the grandfather (grandfather+dad). The dedebabas (Albanian: kryegjysh) are the spiritual and religious leaders of the Bektashi community. Bektashis do not consider them to be divinely appointed leaders. The current and eighth Bektashi dedebaba is Baba Mondi.

== List of dedebabas ==
List of dedebabas following the 1925 exodus of the Bektashi Order from Turkey to Albania:

No.	Portrait	Name	Term in office	
1		Salih Nijazi (1876–1941)	20 March 1930	28 November 1941
1		Salih Nijazi (1876–1941)	11 years, 8 months and 8 days	
2		Ali Riza (1882–1944)	6 January 1942	22 February 1944
2		Ali Riza (1882–1944)	2 years, 1 month and 16 days	
3		Kamber Ali (1869–1950)	12 April 1944	1945
3		Kamber Ali (1869–1950)	0 or 1 year	
4		Xhafer Sadik (1874–1945)	5 May 1945	2 August 1945
4		Xhafer Sadik (1874–1945)	2 months and 28 days	
5		Abaz Hilmi (1887–1947)	6 September 1945	19 March 1947
5		Abaz Hilmi (1887–1947)	1 year, 6 months and 13 days	
6		Ahmet Myftar (1916–1980)	8 June 1947	1958
6		Ahmet Myftar (1916–1980)	9 or 10 years	
7		Baba Reshat (1935–2011)	20 July 1993	2 April 2011
7		Baba Reshat (1935–2011)	17 years, 8 months and 13 days	
8		Baba Mondi (born 1959)	11 June 2011	Incumbent
8		Baba Mondi (born 1959)	15 years, 1 month and 19 days	

== See also ==
- Dede (religious figure)
- Baba (in Albanian)
- List of Bektashi topics (in Albanian)
