= Presidential transition of Bill Clinton =

Transfer of presidential power from George H. W. Bush to Bill Clinton

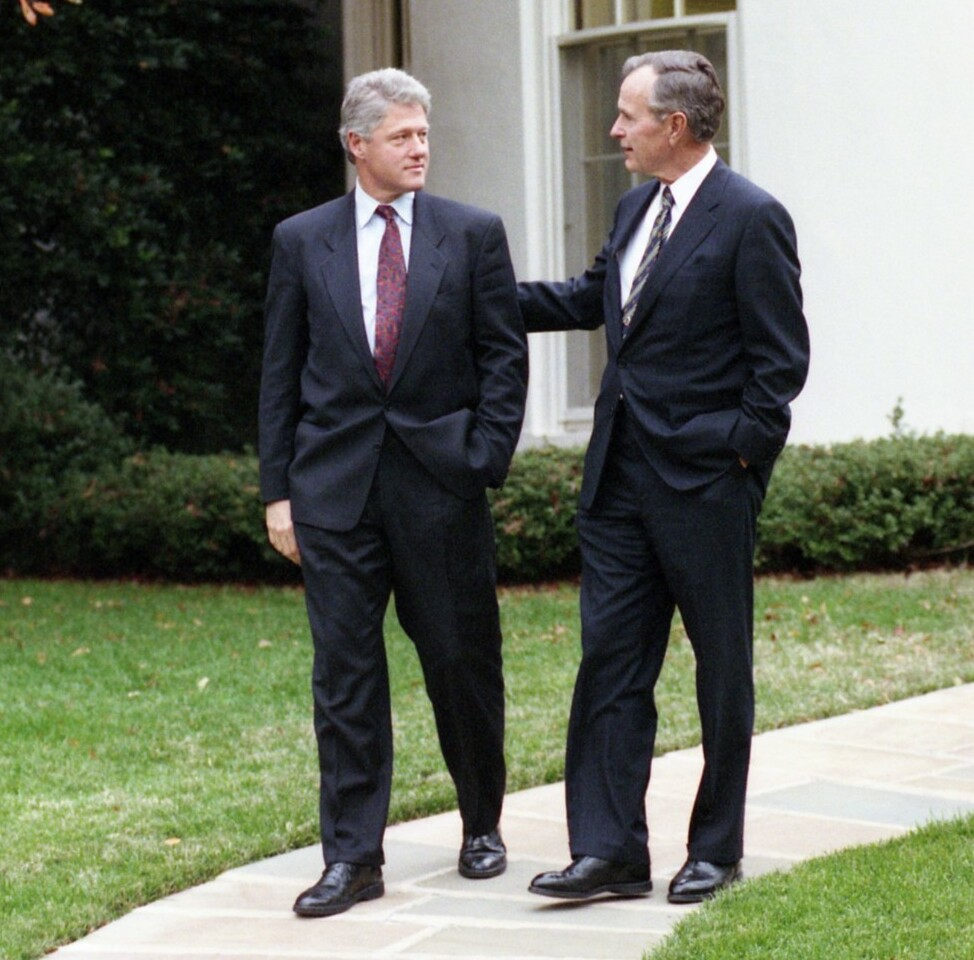
- President George H. W. Bush (right) meeting with President-elect Bill Clinton (left) at the White House on November 18, 1992.
- Election date: November 3, 1992
- Inauguration date: January 20, 1993
- President-elect: Bill Clinton (Democrat)
- Vice president-elect: Al Gore (Democrat)
- Outgoing president: George H. W. Bush (Republican)
- Outgoing vice president: Dan Quayle (Republican)
- Headquarters: Little Rock, Arkansas and Washington, D.C.
- Leaders: Warren Christopher (Director); Vernon Jordan (Chairman)

The presidential transition of Bill Clinton began when he won the United States presidential election on November 3, 1992, and became the president-elect. Clinton was formally elected by the Electoral College on December 14, 1992. The results were certified by a joint session of Congress on January 6, 1993, and the transition ended when Clinton was inaugurated on January 20, 1993.

== Pre-election developments ==
Clinton's presidential campaign launched an effort to plan for a prospective presidential transition in August 1992. The effort was known as the "Clinton-Gore Pre-Transition Planning Foundation" or the "Clinton–Gore Presidential Transition Planning Foundation". Clinton chose to have the effort be headed by his campaign chair Mickey Kantor. Businessman Gerald Stern was named as the coordinator of the planning group on September 24, 1992, heading its day-to-day operations. Assisting him was lawyer John Hart. Other members of the team included Warren Christopher, Henry Cisneros, Vernon Jordan, and Madeleine Kunin. The team was headquartered in Little Rock, Arkansas, in an office suite in a building only blocks away from the campaign's headquarters. Barry Carter oversaw the national security aspects of the transition planning. The team collected vast amounts of research on past presidential transitions, and compiled a large briefing books outlining a strategy for a potential transition. By late-October, the transition effort had a full-time staff of between ten and fifteen people. By late-October, the team had also received roughly 2,000 inquiries from job seekers in their prospective presidential administration. Despite the early start, few decisions about hires for Clinton's administration were outlined until after the election.

Planning for the logistics of the potential transition was overseen by John P. Hart. The transition team had already, in the weeks before the election, begun preparing office space in downtown Washington, D.C. to house part of the prospective post-election transition's staff if Clinton or another candidate were to unseat him in the election. On October 6, 1992, President George H. W. Bush signed an appropriation that would provide $5 million to a prospective transition. If Clinton or another candidate were to win, the appropriation would give the president-elect's transition team $3.5 million, and give $1.5 million to Bush's administration to aid them in the transition. This was in accordance with a 1988 increase in funding for presidential transitions to these amounts.

== Official transition ==
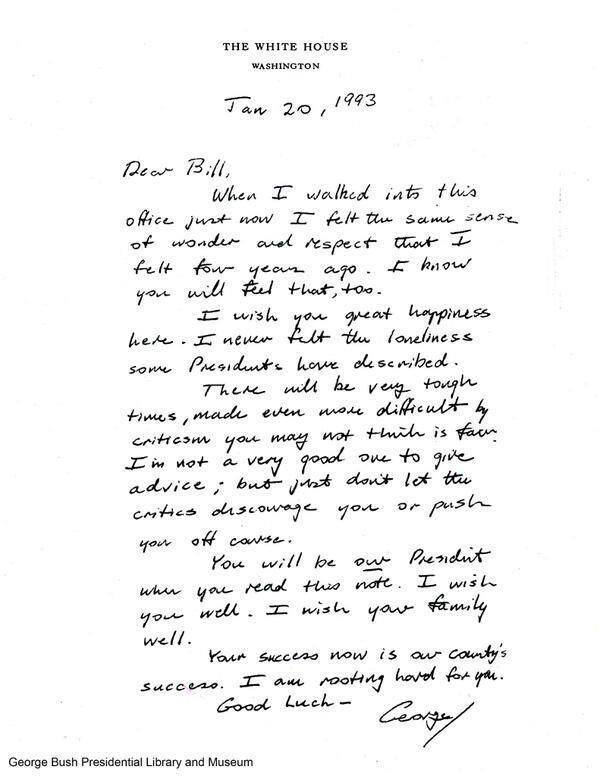
Letter which outgoing president George H. W. Bush left in the Oval Office for incoming president Bill Clinton at the end of the transition Text of the letter: January 20, 1993 Dear Bill, When I walked into this office just now I felt the same sense of wonder and respect that I felt four years ago. I know you will feel that, too. I wish you great happiness here. I never felt the loneliness some Presidents have described. There will be very tough times, made even more difficult by criticism you may not think is fair. I’m not a very good one to give advice; but just don’t let the critics discourage you or push you off course. You will be our President when you read this note. I wish you well. I wish your family well. Your success now is our country’s success. I am rooting hard for you. Good luck— George

After Clinton defeated Bush in the election, both Bush and Clinton publicly proclaimed their desire for a smooth transition between their administrations.

In addition to transitioning into the presidency, Clinton had to transition out of the Arkansas governorship. The last time that a sitting governor had transitioned into the presidency had been Franklin D. Roosevelt after the 1932 United States presidential election. Clinton resigned from his governorship on December 12, 1992.

Following the election, after tensions between Kantor and Clinton's top campaign staff had arisen, Kantor was dismissed as head of the transition effort. On November 6, Warren Christopher was named as the transition director and Vernon Jordan was named to serve as the chairman of the transition's board, making them co-leaders of the transition. Bush named Andrew Card to head the Bush administration's role in the transition.

On November 13, Clinton named several dozen other members of his transition team. The members he named were noted by The New York Times to have, "diversity in age, sex and ethnic background". Robert Reich was named to lead the economic policy team, and Sandy Berger was named to lead the foreign policy team. Clinton's transition team largely consisted of individuals that had worked on his presidential campaign. Outreach to ethnic American communities, which had been led during the campaign by Christopher Hyland as Deputy National Political Director for Ethnic Constituencies, continued into the transition with Hyland serving as Assistant Deputy National Political Director.

On November 13, Clinton outlined ethics guidelines for his transition staff. These guidelines would forbid any staff or volunteers from, in the first six months of the Clinton administration, lobbying the government in areas they had worked on during the transition. The ethics guidelines also required transition workers to file detailed financial disclosure forms, and forbid them from doing any work on the transition that appeared to be a conflict of interest. These ethics guidelines received praise from the groups Common Cause and Public Citizen.

On November 18, President Bush hosted President-elect Clinton at the White House. The following day, First Lady Barbara Bush hosted a tour of the residence for incoming First Lady Hillary Clinton.

In the early weeks of the transition, the president-elect's communications director, George Stephanopoulos, said that the president-elect was receiving roughly 30,000 items of mail per day.

In addition to the $3.5 million, the government provided the Clinton transition team, $5.3 million was raised through private contributions to fund their effort.

The transition was considered chaotic in some respects. In late January 1993, shortly after the transition ended, historian Carl Brauer described his assessment of performance of Clinton's transition as, "mixed". The transition was headquartered both in Little Rock, Arkansas and Washington, D.C., with this geographic split of the operation creating some problems. The main decisions tended to be made from the Little Rock headquarters, where Clinton largely remained during the transition. The transition's policy advisors were ideologically split between centrists and liberals. Clinton's transition took longer than his predecessor to designate appointees to top positions. The transition began publicly announcing the first his designees to be appointed to major executive branch offices six weeks after winning the election. It finished announcing them in the eleventh week following his election victory. It also took Clinton particularly long to name a White House Chief of Staff, with him waiting until mid-December before naming Mack McLarty.

Clinton spent great amounts of time during the transition devising plans with an intimate group of confidantes, including his wife Hillary, vice-president-elect Al Gore, and transition director Warren Christopher. Much of these discussions were had in the study of the Arkansas Governor's Mansion. Clinton deeply involved himself with the details of his new presidential administration, especially the selection of members of his Cabinet. Clinton's wife was also heavily involved in making staffing decisions for his Cabinet. Both Clinton and his wife had interest in making his cabinet have increased racial diversity and more women members than past cabinets. Clinton himself had declared the goal of choosing a Cabinet that, "looks like America". The Clintons' decision to be so deeply involved in personnel decisions contributed to the delay in naming individuals to the positions.

In contrast to his deep involvement with Cabinet staffing decisions, Clinton paid comparatively little attention to many staffing decisions for his White House staff. Clinton would later write in his autobiography My Life that he had "spent so much time on the cabinet" that he "hardly spent any time on the White House staff". Clinton also avoided appointing White House insiders to his administrations, making few hires of individuals that had served in the administration of the last Democratic president, Jimmy Carter. Clinton appeared to demonstrate possible hostility towards hiring Washington insiders. Consequentially, many of his White House hires were of individuals that had worked on his campaign, but who were largely young and lacked government experience. The transition also failed to heed the advice of the outgoing Bush administration to name members of his White House staff early into his transition. While Clinton refrained from hiring many veterans of past administrations, his transition team did meet for advice with members of past Democratic administrations, particularly those of John F. Kennedy, Lyndon B. Johnson, and Jimmy Carter.

Clinton had roughly 4,000 executive branch positions to make appointments to, in addition to setting a budget and political agenda.

Officially heading personnel selection was Richard Riley. However, after Riley was named to be Clinton's choice for Secretary of Education, he found his attention divided between his role in the transition and preparing for his pending position in the presidential administration.

Clinton, throughout his transition, made clear that he understood that, until January 20, the country had a singular president, George H. W. Bush. As the inauguration came close, Bush's advisers had begun working with Clinton's advisors, particularly on foreign policy, to ensure that there would be a smooth transfer of power. For instance, for weeks before the inauguration, Brent Scowcroft, Bush's National Security Advisor, would meet daily with Anthony Lake, who Clinton had designated to be his National Security Advisor.

In December, Clinton was a participant in a televised economic summit in Little Rock. While this provided an opportunity for the president-elect to display his policy knowledge, the summit also took up valuable time during a crucial stage of his transition.

=== Controversies ===
Controversy arose when president-elect Clinton indicated support for allowing homosexual individuals to openly serve in the United States Armed Forces, a stance that was contrary both to the position of the Joint Chiefs of Staff and Clinton's own Democratic Party.

A scandal arose about Clinton's choice for Attorney General, Zoe Baird, having failed to pay taxes for domestic servants that had been in the country illegally. The scandal became known as "Nannygate". Baird's nomination would ultimately end up being withdrawn the day after Clinton's inauguration.

=== Iraq crisis ===
Beginning roughly two weeks before Bush was to hand power over to Clinton, perhaps seeking to take advantage of the possible hesitancy of Bush to respond right before the end of the transition, Iraqi dictator Saddam Hussein began engaging in brinksmanship. In response, on January 13, 1993, Bush ordered a limited airstrike on Iraq. In the days before the airstrike, Clinton received detailed briefings on the situation. Bush's national security advisors spoke with the men Clinton had designated to be his when he took office. President Bush called Clinton an hour before the airstrike to inform him of the decision. While the airstrike was ultimately Bush's decision, a top Bush administration official claimed that Clinton and his own national security advisors had been "partners in the deliberations" over the airstrike. Clinton said that the airstrike was, "the right decision, done in the right way."

== Analysis of transition ==
The transition has been considered chaotic, in some respects. In 2001, Stephen Hess of the Brookings Institution called the transition, "downright chaotic". In 2008, Dan Brillman of Newsweek characterized the transition as "clumsy" as well as "unfocused and undisciplined". Clinton's press secretary Dee Dee Myers would later call the transition period "hell".

== See also ==
- Bill Clinton 1992 presidential campaign
- First inauguration of Bill Clinton
