= Rogue Nation =

Rogue nation or rogue state is a term applied to countries perceived to be threatening world peace.

Rogue Nation may also refer to:

- Rogue Nation (book), by Clyde Prestowitz
- Mission: Impossible – Rogue Nation, the fifth instalment of the film series
