= Hazis Vardar =

Belgian theatre owner

- Born: 1968 (age 57–58); Belgium
- Citizenship: Belgium; Albania
- Occupations: Theatre owner; Producer; Author; Museum founder
- Years active: 1990s–present
- Known for: Co-ownership of Le Palace (2006–2025); founder of the Banksy Museum; representative of the Bektashi Worldwide Headquarters for France and Belgium
- Relatives: Alil Vardar (brother)

Hazis Vardar (born 1968) is a Belgian theatre owner, producer, and author of Albanian descent. With his brother Alil Vardar, he co-owns the Paris theatres La Grande Comédie and the Comédie Saint-Martin; from 2006 to 2025, the brothers also co-owned Le Palace. He is also the founder of the Banksy Museum, a chain of immersive exhibitions presenting reproductions of works by the British street artist Banksy. Vardar also serves as the Bektashi Worldwide Headquarters' representative for France and Belgium.

== Early life ==
Vardar was born in 1968 in Belgium to immigrant parents whom he has described as shepherds from Macedonia, and grew up in Brussels. He is the elder brother of the comedian and playwright Alil Vardar by roughly eighteen months. As a young man, he worked as a lighting technician for sketch performances by Alil in pizzerias before the brothers opened their own venue.

== Career ==
=== Theatre ===
The Vardar brothers opened their first café-théâtre in Brussels in 1994, followed by a second in Liège and a third in Charleroi. Unable to expand further in Belgium, they moved into France, taking over Les 3T in Toulouse in 2004, followed by venues in Montpellier and Avignon and, in Paris, the Comédie République and the Grande Comédie. In November 2006, Hazis and Alil Vardar acquired Le Palace in partnership with Francis and Chantal Lemaire, the owners of Radio Contact in Belgium. After roughly twenty months of work and around €1.5 million in renovations to the listed Art Deco building, the 970-seat venue reopened on 5 November 2008 with a show by Valérie Lemercier. In October 2011, the brothers placed Le Palace on the market for €15 million, with Hazis Vardar saying the family wished to move on to other projects after restoring the building to working order. The venue was unused from 2023 and was eventually bought in 2025 by Mickaël Chétrit, head of the production company Very Good Show.

In November 2016, the brothers opened the Comédie Saint-Martin in the 3rd arrondissement of Paris, inaugurating it with Alil Vardar's Le Clan des divorcées. Hazis Vardar is managing director (directeur général) of La Grande Comédie in the 9th arrondissement of Paris, where his brother Alil serves as artistic director. He has directed several productions written by Alil, including Le Clan des divorcées and Pas nés sous la même étoile.

=== Banksy Museum ===
Vardar founded the Banksy Museum, a series of immersive exhibitions presenting reproductions of works by Banksy. The first venue opened in Paris at the Espace Lafayette Drouot, 44 rue du Faubourg Montmartre, in a former three-level underground car park; the pieces were recreated by street artists in settings evoking their original urban context. Further locations have since opened in Brussels, Barcelona, Prague, Kraków, Milan, Dubai, and New York.

The project has drawn criticism from art and intellectual-property lawyers, who argue that displaying replicas of Banksy's site-specific works indoors and charging admission alters their meaning and undermines the artist's intent of free public access. Vardar has defended the museum as a way of preserving works that, given the transient nature of street art, would otherwise be lost to weather, vandalism, or removal, and has noted that he himself privately collects original Banksys.

=== Bektashi Order ===
The Bektashi Worldwide Headquarters in Tirana appointed Vardar as its representative for France and Belgium, as part of a network of overseas envoys established in preparation for the proposed Bektashi Microstate within Albania.

== Publications ==
- Vardar, Hazis (2023). Musée Banksy : catalogue complet. Paris: Albin Michel. ISBN 978-2-226-48669-1. An English-language edition was published in 2024 as Banksy Museum: Complete Catalogue (ISBN 978-2-226-48856-5). Author royalties from the book are donated to SOS Méditerranée.
