= List of international presidential trips made by Slobodan Milošević =

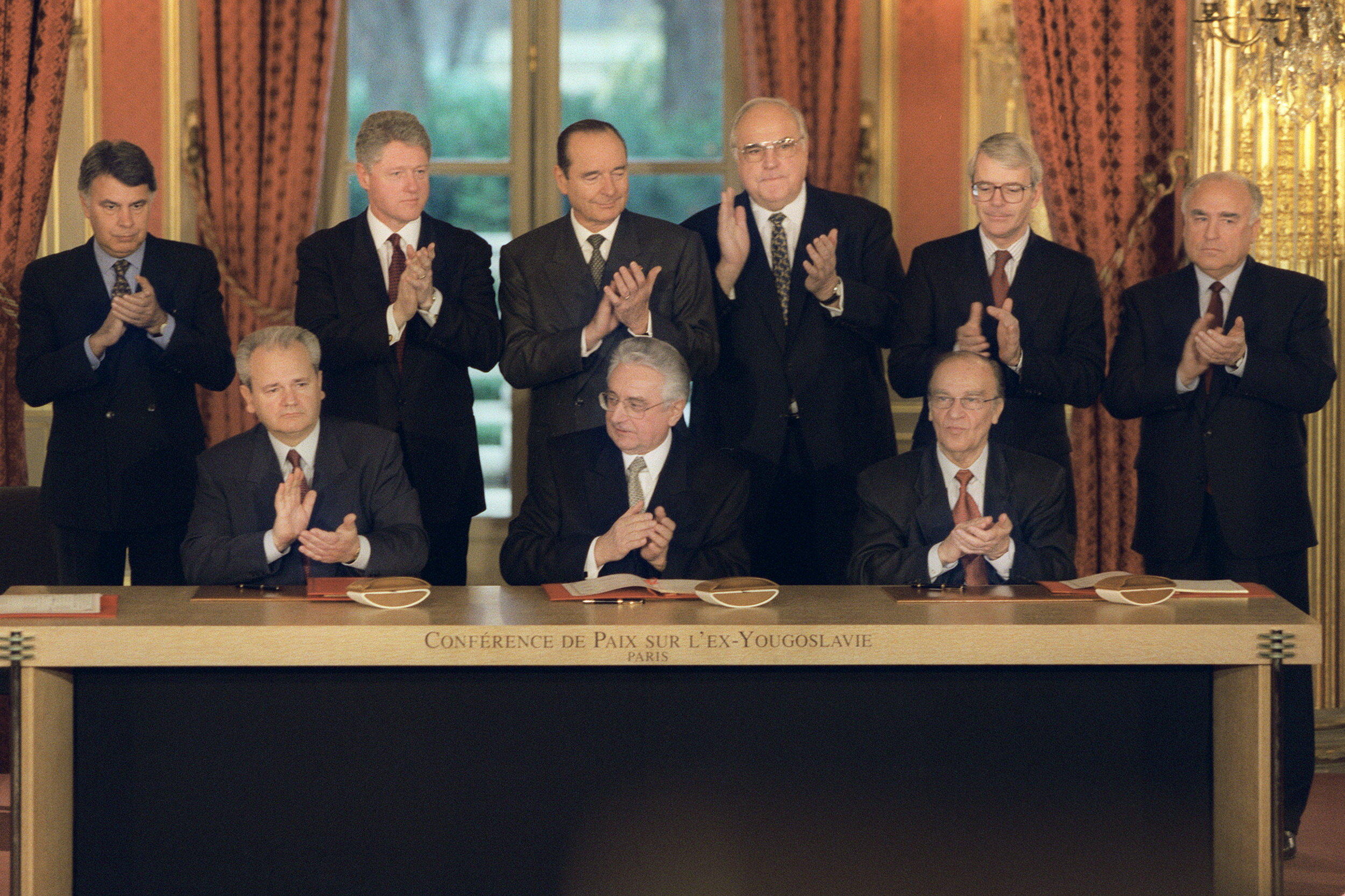
Slobodan Milošević at the signing ceremony of the Dayton Agreement in Paris, 1995

This is a list of international presidential trips made by Slobodan Milošević, who served as President of Serbia from 1989 to 1997 and President of the Federal Republic of Yugoslavia from 1997 to 2000. During his presidency, Milošević was significantly restricted from making foreign trips due to the imposition of UN sanctions and his indictment by the International Criminal Court in 1999 for crimes against humanity during the Kosovo War.

== As President of Serbia ==
Country	Areas visited	Date(s)	Notes
France	Paris	29 August 1991	Met with President François Mitterrand. Discussed the Yugoslav crisis.
Netherlands	The Hague	7 September 1991	Attended the Peace Conference on Yugoslavia.
Soviet Union	Moscow	15 October 1991	Met with Soviet President Mikhail Gorbachev and Croatian President Franjo Tuđman.
Switzerland	Geneva	23 November 1991	Signed the Geneva Accord.
Greece	Athens	16 January 1992	Met with Prime Minister Konstantinos Mitsotakis. Discussed the Yugoslav crisis.
United Kingdom	London	26-27 August 1992	Attended the International Peace Conference on Yugoslavia.
France	Paris	11 March 1993	Met with President François Mitterrand and UN officials.
Greece	Athens	1-2 May 1993	Attended the International Peace Conference on the Resolution of the Crisis in Bosnia and Herzegovina.
Romania	Bucharest	5 April 1994	Official visit. Met with President Ion Iliescu.
Greece	Athens	19 December 1994	Working visit. Met with Prime Minister Andreas Papandreou.
Russia	Moscow	10 August 1995	Met with President Boris Yeltsin and Minister of Foreign Affairs Andrei Kozyrev.
United States	Dayton	31 October - 22 November 1995	Attended the Dayton conference. Met with American Secretary of State Warren Christopher, Croatian President Franjo Tuđman and Bosnian President Alija Izetbegović.
France	Paris	13-14 December 1995	Attended the signing ceremony of the Dayton Peace Agreement at the Élysée Palace.
Italy	Rome	17-18 February 1996	Attended a summit of Balkan leaders. Discussed the implementation of the Dayton Agreement.
Switzerland	Geneva	2 June 1996	Met with American Secretary of State Warren Christopher, Croatian President Franjo Tuđman and Bosnian President Alija Izetbegović. Discussed the implementation of the Dayton Agreement.
Greece	Athens	7 August 1996	Met with Greek Prime Minister Costas Simitis and Croatian President Franjo Tuđman. Discussed the normalization of Croatian-Serbian relations.
Switzerland	Geneva	14 August 1996	Met with American Secretary of State Warren Christopher, Croatian President Franjo Tuđman and Bosnian President Alija Izetbegović.
France	Paris	3 October 1996	Met with French President Jacques Chirac and Bosnian President Alija Izetbegović. Agreed to reestablish diplomatic relations with Bosnia and Herzegovina.

== As President of the Federal Republic of Yugoslavia ==
Country	Areas visited	Date(s)	Notes
China	Beijing and Shanghai	13-16 November 1997	State visit. Met with President Jiang Zemin and Premier Li Peng. Signed an agreement on economic cooperation.
Russia	Moscow	16 June 1998	Met with President Boris Yeltsin. Held talks regarding the Kosovo War.
