= Christopher Hyland =

Christopher S. Hyland
- Born: September 19, 1947 (age 78); Salem, Massachusetts, U.S.
- Education: Georgetown University (School of Foreign Service); Episcopal Divinity School; Harvard University (cross-registration)
- Occupations: Businessman, diplomatic advisor, interfaith envoy
- Known for: Deputy National Political Director, Clinton 1992 campaign Honorary Consul, Republic of Malta; Special Envoy, Bektashi Worldwide Headquarters; Founder, Christopher Hyland, Inc.
- Awards: Knight of the Order of Skanderbeg (Albania); Order of Dr. Ibrahim Rugova (Kosovo); Gandhi Peace Award; Saint Patrick Peace Award

Christopher S. Hyland (born September 19, 1947) is an American businessman, public affairs strategist, and diplomatic advisor. He is the founder of Christopher Hyland, Inc., a New York City-based luxury textiles firm, and served as Deputy National Political Director for Ethnic Constituencies in the 1992 Clinton presidential campaign. He currently serves as Special Envoy to North America and Europe for the Bektashi Worldwide Headquarters.

== Early life and education ==
Hyland was born in Salem, Massachusetts, to Samuel Hyland, a lawyer and past president of the Salem City Council, and Patricia Hyland, a sculptor. He attended boarding schools in New England and Switzerland, studying at the Ecole Nouvelle de la Suisse Romande in Lausanne and the American School in Lugano.

He graduated in 1970 with a Bachelor of Science in Foreign Service from the Edmund A. Walsh School of Foreign Service at Georgetown University, where he was a fellow student of Bill Clinton. The two first met during Clinton's campaign for student body president at Georgetown. After a tour of active duty in the National Guard, he pursued graduate studies at the Episcopal Divinity School in Cambridge, Massachusetts, cross-registering at Harvard University.

== Business career ==
In the mid-1970s, Hyland purchased textiles during a trekking expedition in the Himalayas, brought them to New York, and launched a career in the luxury fabric trade. While still in his twenties, he founded Christopher Hyland, Inc., headquartered in the Decoration & Design Building on Third Avenue in Manhattan. The firm imports high-end fabrics, wall coverings, trimmings, and rugs from countries including Italy, France, England, and India, and maintains one of the world's largest collections of silks.

The company's textiles have appeared in film productions including The Age of Innocence, Interview with the Vampire, and Hook, as well as in hotels including the Bellagio and The Carlyle in New York City.

Hyland is also CEO and design director of WCLI and Hylandtown, a Colorado-based urban development project.

== Political career ==
=== 1992 Clinton campaign ===
Hyland was one of the 14 founding members of the Clinton for President campaign. He took leave from his textile business and traveled to Little Rock, Arkansas, to serve as Deputy National Political Director for Ethnic Constituencies, organizing electoral coalitions across Albanian, Ukrainian, Irish, Middle Eastern, Indian, and Korean American communities.

Following the election, he chaired 11 Clinton presidential transition conferences on topics including Eastern Europe, Ireland, veterans, Indian Country, housing, and "The Politics of Inclusion." In addition to these was a December 1992 roundtable on design and economic competitiveness, in which Hyland convened approximately two dozen designers and architects — including Maya Lin, Max Bond, and representatives from Mazda and Nissan — to discuss design as a national economic tool and a force for social change. It was described as the first time an incoming administration had sought input from the design community. President Clinton wrote of Hyland in his autobiography My Life (page 399), crediting him with "making an important contribution to victory in the general election, and laying the foundation for our continuing unprecedented contact with ethnic communities once we got to the White House". Hyland is also discussed in several other published accounts of the Clinton era, including Michael Takiff's A Complicated Man: The Life of Bill Clinton as Told by Those Who Know Him (Yale University Press, 2010) and Diaspora Lobbies and the US Government (New York University Press, 2014).

=== Northern Ireland peace process ===
Hyland played a role in connecting the Clinton campaign with the Irish American community and ensuring that Clinton's campaign promises regarding Northern Ireland were maintained after the election. He arranged an emergency Irish conference in Little Rock during the transition, bringing together activists and transition officials. The Irish Voice newspaper described him as "the unsung hero of the Irish Peace Process."

He is mentioned several times in Daring Diplomacy: Clinton's Secret Search for Peace in Ireland by Conor O'Clery. He is also referenced in Penn Rhodeen's Peacerunner (2016), Gerry Adams' A Farther Shore (2003), Niall O'Dowd's An Irish Voice (2010), Joseph E. Thompson's American Policy and Northern Ireland (2001), and Marianne Elliott's The Long Road to Peace in Northern Ireland (Liverpool University Press, 2007). He was also featured in a BBC documentary about his role in the Northern Ireland peace process and appeared on ITN commenting on the Irish and Balkan situations.

== Balkans advocacy ==
For over thirty years, Hyland has been engaged in advocacy for the sovereignty of Kosovo and the integration of the Western Balkans into Euro-Atlantic frameworks. In an August 1992 memorandum to Clinton campaign leadership, he wrote that "the war in Yugoslavia began in Kosova and could end in Kosova."

In 2023, he delivered speeches at LUMSA in Rome and at the Sorbonne in Paris in defense of the Constitution of Kosovo, the latter alongside Kosovo Prime Minister Albin Kurti. He has proposed a "Commonwealth of Balkan Countries" as a permanent forum for regional cooperation, emphasizing that it would complement rather than replace EU accession.

In July 2025, acting Prime Minister Kurti hosted Hyland in Pristina, where they discussed political developments, foreign investment, and Kosovo-United States relations.

The Albanian Telegraphic Agency (ATSH) has identified Hyland as being present at official meetings with the Kosovo prime minister alongside other Albanian-American community leaders.

He has also been covered by Telegrafi, which reported on his role chairing a dinner with U.S. congressmen including Gregory Meeks at which Albanian-American community relations were discussed.

== Bektashi Order and Interfaith Diplomacy ==
In 2024, the Albanian government announced the establishment of the Sovereign State of the Bektashi Order — a Vatican-style microstate in Tirana. Hyland was appointed Special Envoy to North America and Europe by the Bektashi Worldwide Headquarters.

In an interview with the Albanian Daily News, Hyland described the Bektashi as advocating for "commonality rather than cruelty" and argued that a Bektashi state would positively impact Europe's future. He has appeared on Euronews Albania discussing the Iranian opposition and the Bektashi Microstate.

== Foreign affairs commentary ==
In March 2026, Hyland published a firsthand account in National Review of a 1994 White House state dinner at which National Security Adviser Sandy Berger outlined the decision for Ukraine to sign the Budapest Memorandums, surrendering the world's third-largest nuclear arsenal. Hyland wrote that he had urged Ukrainian President Leonid Kuchma not to relinquish Ukraine's nuclear weapons if it wished to safeguard its sovereignty against Russia.

In his Kyiv Post op-ed "From Tehran to Tirana" (June 2025), Hyland argued that a post-theocratic Iran could shift the global balance from the Balkans to Kyiv, and urged the West to support Iranian civil society through academic exchange and cultural diplomacy.

Hyland has also written on Iranian affairs for The Times of Israel and Euractiv. In his Times of Israel essay "Iran's Awakening: The Fall of Clerical Rule" (February 2026), he called for support for moderate Shia voices including Bektashi and Ismaili traditions as alternatives to theocratic rule. In a separate essay, he recounted a 1975 meeting with Shah Mohammad Reza Pahlavi in Tehran, reflecting on the Shah's statesmanship and the trajectory of Iranian history.

He has also appeared on Euronews Albania discussing the Iranian opposition and the proposed Bektashi Microstate.

== Cultural patronage ==
Hyland commissioned the Hyland Peace Mass, composed by Maltese Maestro Joseph Vella, as a call to peace and acceptance of diversity. The work received its American premiere at St. Patrick's Cathedral in New York in 2016, conducted by David Hayes with the New York Choral Society. It was subsequently performed in Pristina with the Kosovo Philharmonic for Kosovo's fifteenth anniversary of independence (February 2023), attended by the presidents of Kosovo and Albania, and at the Pantheon in Rome (June 2023), organized by the Bartolucci Foundation.

He has commissioned or donated works to institutions including the Vatican Museums — where a triptych of the Last Supper by photographer Bill Armstrong, commissioned by Hyland, was admitted to the collection by Pope Benedict XVI — the Morgan Library, and the Cape Cod Museum of Art. He previously served as an Honorary Consul of the Republic of Malta.

== Indian American engagement ==
During the 1992 campaign, Hyland organized outreach to the Indian American community as part of his ethnic constituencies portfolio. He is a recipient of a Service Award from the National Federation of Indian American Associations. In 2020, he published an op-ed in the News India Times appealing to Indian Americans to vote for Donald Trump, drawing on his history of engagement with the community dating to the Clinton campaign.

== Honors and awards ==
- Knight of the Order of Skanderbeg, awarded by President of Albania Ilir Meta (2021)
- Order of Dr. Ibrahim Rugova (Republic of Kosovo)
- VATRA Gold Medal
- Gandhi Peace Award for contributions to interfaith dialogue
- Saint Patrick Peace Award (shared with Senator George Mitchell)
- National Federation of Indian American Associations Service Award
- Honorary Doctorate of Humanities, Savannah College of Art and Design (1993)
- Honorary Doctorate, New York School of Interior Design
- Honorary Doctorate in Economics, Kyiv National Economic University
- Honorary Doctorate, Notre Dame University, Lebanon
- Honorary doctorate (Doctor Honoris Causa) from the University of Prizren "Ukshin Hoti" in Kosovo and from UBT, which established The Hyland Center for Global Studies
- Member, Order of Malta
- Member, Bruderschaft St. Christoph (Austria)

== Personal life ==
Hyland resides in New York City. He is an avid sailor since childhood in Marblehead, Massachusetts.
