= Rogue Nation (book) =

2003 book by Clyde Prestowitz

Rogue Nation: American Unilateralism And The Failure Of Good Intentions
- Author: Clyde Prestowitz
- Publication date: 2003
- ISBN: 9780465062799

Rogue Nation is a book by Clyde Prestowitz which criticizes George W. Bush's foreign policies as "unilateralist."

== Reviews ==
The book, written by the founder and President of the Economic Strategy Institute, is critical of the policies and practices of George Bush. The author examines many issues where the U.S. has disagreed with the rest of the world: free trade agreements, global warming, the Israel-Palestine conflict, the treaty to eliminate land mines, the creation of an International Criminal Court, the war on Iraq and more.

The author argues neither for nor against particular policies, but rather against the manner in which those policies are implemented. He explores the historical roots of unilateralism and shows how it shapes American foreign policy in many important areas: trade and economic policy, arms control, energy, environment, drug trafficking, & agriculture. He states that much of the international community regards the United States as a "rogue nation"—whether they are in fact or not. Prestowitz notes, "Nations are very much like individuals. More than desire for material gain or fear or love, they are driven by a craving for dignity and respect, by the need to be recognized as valid and just as valuable as the next person or country."

He proposes that America's people and its leaders become better listeners. He interviewed an impressive number of foreign diplomats, ambassadors, and government officials, and he truthfully presents their views even when he does not concur. He provides historical context for various controversies.

The book is described by several reviewers as informative and challenging.

== Publisher's comments ==
Prestowitz, a former Reagan Administration trade official, is by no means anti-American. He insists that America's intentions are usually good, and that the world likes and admires Americans when they live up to their own ideals.

ISBN 0-465-06279-2, Basic Books (2003)
