= Banksy Museum =

Chain of unofficial art exhibitions

- Musée Banksy
- Established: 2021 (as The World of Banksy — The Immersive Experience, Paris); permanent Banksy Museum from 2022
- Location: Multiple cities
- Type: Private art exhibition
- Founder: Hazis Vardar
- Website: https://museebanksy.fr

The Banksy Museum (French: Musée Banksy) is a chain of private, for-profit immersive exhibitions presenting full-size reproductions of works by the British street artist Banksy. Founded by Belgian theatre owner Hazis Vardar, the first venue opened in Paris in 2021 as a temporary show before becoming a permanent installation; further locations have since been opened in Brussels, Barcelona, Prague, Kraków, Milan, Dubai and New York City.

The works displayed are not original; they are recreated by anonymous local street artists in settings designed to evoke the original urban contexts of the murals. The museum is not authorised by Banksy or by Pest Control Office, the artist's authentication body, and it has been criticised by art and intellectual-property commentators for charging admission to view replicas of works whose original meaning depended on free public access in the street.

== History ==
=== Origins in Paris ===
The project began as a temporary exhibition entitled The World of Banksy — The Immersive Experience, which opened in June 2021 at the Espace Lafayette Drouot, 44 rue du Faubourg Montmartre, in the 9th arrondissement of Paris. The venue is a former three-level underground car park converted into an exhibition space, with around 1,200 m^{2} of floor area presenting roughly 100 reproductions across three levels. Following strong attendance, the exhibition was made permanent and rebranded as the Banksy Museum (Musée Banksy). A reproduction of Banksy's Walled Off Hotel in Bethlehem was later opened next door as a paying companion attraction.

The founder, Hazis Vardar, is a Brussels-born theatre owner and producer who, with his brother Alil Vardar, previously co-owned the Paris venues Le Palace, La Grande Comédie and the Comédie Saint-Martin. Vardar has said that he privately collects original Banksy works.

=== Expansion ===
After the success of the Paris venue, similar permanent exhibitions were opened in other European cities. The Brussels location is housed in a former fabric warehouse at Rue de Laeken 28, near Place De Brouckère and Place Sainte-Catherine, and presents more than 130 works across roughly 1,000 m^{2}. The Kraków venue occupies the post-industrial interior of Marcin Jarra's former Plated, Silver and Metal Products Factory, an 1886 building of more than 1,000 m^{2}, and presents some 150 works. By the time of the New York opening in 2024, the publisher of Vardar's exhibition catalogue listed branches in Paris, Brussels, Barcelona, Prague, Kraków, Milan and Dubai.

=== New York City ===
The New York location opened on 15 May 2024 at 277 Canal Street, near Broadway in Manhattan. Spanning the second and third floors of the building and approximately 15,000 sq ft (1,400 m^{2}), it presents reproductions of around 160 Banksy works, alongside studio pieces, videos and animated visuals, and was described in press materials as the largest single display of Banksy-related work to date. Adult admission is US$30.

== Exhibition ==
Each Banksy Museum recreates the experience of encountering Banksy's work in the street through fabricated walls of brick or concrete, mock manhole covers, urban debris and ambient soundscapes such as police sirens or helicopter rotors. The murals are reproduced at full scale by teams of unidentified street artists, while the exhibitions also include reproductions of studio works and audiovisual material covering the artist's career. Subjects span Banksy's pieces from the United Kingdom, France, Israel and the Palestinian territories (notably the West Bank wall), the United States and, more recently, Ukraine.

In a 2023 catalogue published by Albin Michel, Vardar set out the museum's curatorial premise that Banksy's site-specific works, many of which have been damaged, painted over, removed or sold, can be preserved for a wider public through faithful reproduction in their original visual context. Royalties from the catalogue are donated to SOS Méditerranée.

== Reception and criticism ==
The Banksy Museum is not authorised by Banksy. Pest Control Office, the body that handles authentication and licensing for the artist, has long stated on its website that Banksy "is not involved or associated with" any of the touring or permanent exhibitions of his work that have appeared around the world. Banksy himself has stated that only Pest Control Office has permission to license his art and that, while he encourages people to copy his images for personal amusement, he does not allow commercial use.

Reporting on the New York opening for NPR, Isabella Gomez Sarmiento noted that the museum's $30 entry fee and indoor presentation sit uneasily with Banksy's frequent criticisms of the commercialisation of street art, including his own slogan "Copyright is for losers", which the museum reproduces on a stairwell wall. The art and intellectual-property attorney Leila Amineddoleh told NPR and La Voce di New York that taking site-specific works such as the balloon girl motif from the West Bank wall indoors and charging admission alters the meaning of the work and undercuts what she described as Banksy's core mission of free public access. She also noted that, although Banksy has expressed disdain for copyright, copyright protection applies to his works regardless of his personal views.

Steven P. Harrington and Jaime Rojo, founders of the street-art documentation project Brooklyn Street Art, told NPR that they considered the use of the word "museum" misleading and compared the recreations to copying Michelangelo's Creation of Adam on the wall of a pizza parlour. Vardar has acknowledged that the project operates outside the conventional rules of the art world, describing Banksy as a "pirate" with whom he identifies, and arguing that an unauthorised approach is appropriate to an artist who has himself worked outside accepted norms. He has also said that, if Banksy objects to the museum, he is free to sue.

== See also ==
- Moco Museum
