= 1992 Democratic Party vice presidential candidate selection =

1992 Democratic vice presidential nomination
- July 9, 1992
| Nominee | Al Gore |
| Home state | Tennessee |
Previous Vice Presidential nominee
Lloyd Bentsen
Vice Presidential nominee
Al Gore

This article lists those who were potential candidates for the Democratic nomination of Vice President of the United States in the 1992 election. On June 2, 1992, Arkansas Governor Bill Clinton won the 1992 Democratic nomination for President of the United States, and became the presumptive nominee. On July 9, 1992, Tennessee Senator Albert Gore Jr. was chosen as his running mate.

Clinton considered roughly forty different candidates for vice president, including those who did not hold elective office, but Clinton ultimately chose Gore, a two-term senator who had previously run for president in 1988. Former Deputy Secretary of State Warren Christopher led Clinton's vice presidential selection team. In making the selection, Clinton emphasized Gore's experience with foreign policy and environmental issues. Clinton's choice of a fellow young southern centrist defied conventional wisdom, but the choice of Gore was well-received, and Gore made an effective surrogate on the campaign trail.

The Clinton–Gore ticket would go on to defeat the Republican ticket of incumbents Bush–Quayle and the Independent ticket of Perot–Stockdale in 1992, and the Republican ticket of Dole–Kemp and the Reform ticket of Perot–Choate in 1996. The Clinton-Gore duo became the youngest ticket in history to win a presidential election. Gore went on to become the Democratic presidential nominee in 2000 but ultimately lost to George W. Bush in the close general election.

== Selection ==
=== Final Six ===
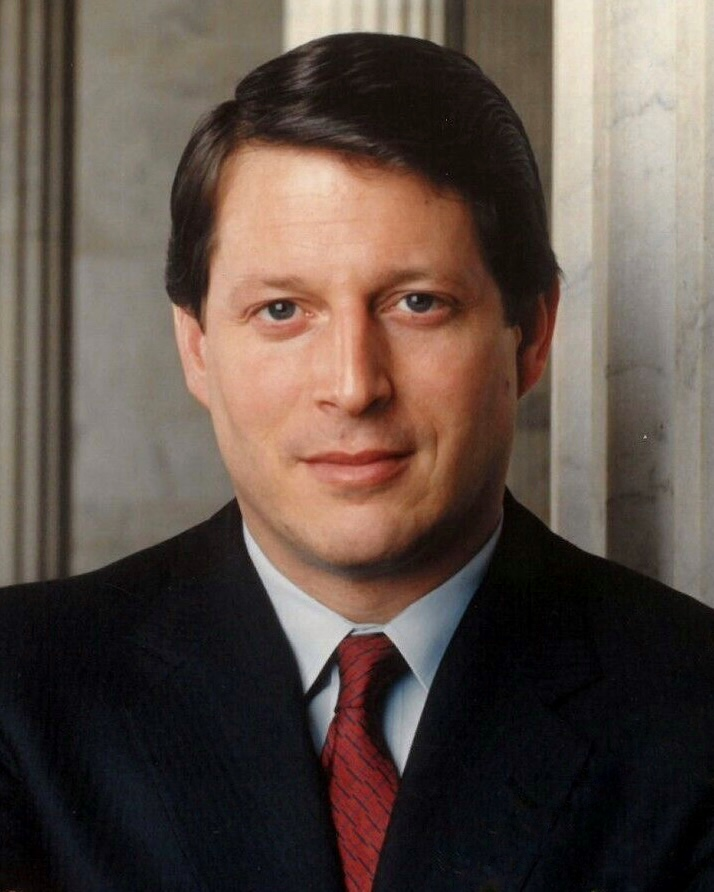
Senator and 1988 presidential candidate
Al Gore
from Tennessee
(1985–1993)

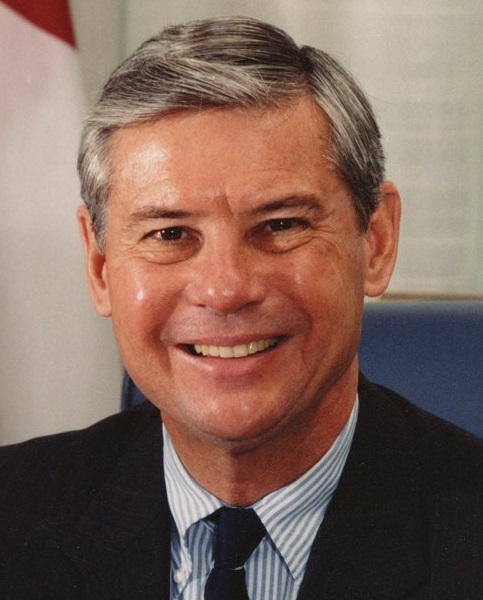
Senator
Bob Graham
from Florida
(1987–2005)

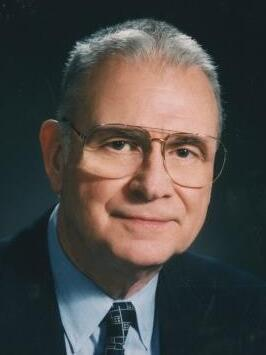
Representative
Lee H. Hamilton
from Indiana
(1965–1999)

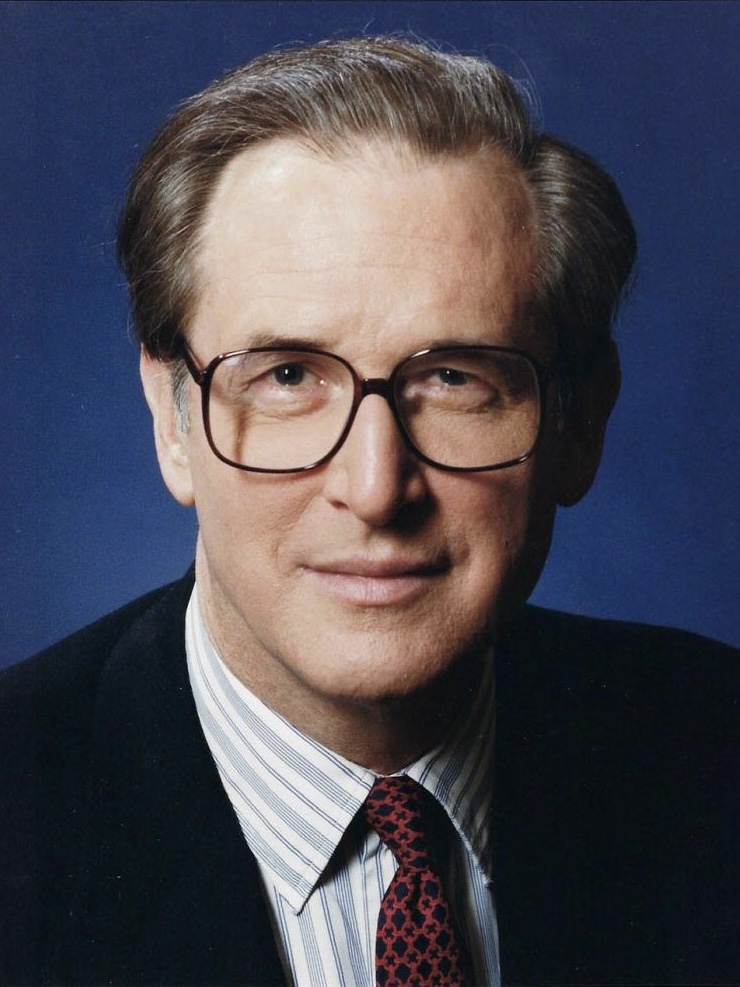
Senator
Jay Rockefeller
from West Virginia
(1985–2015)

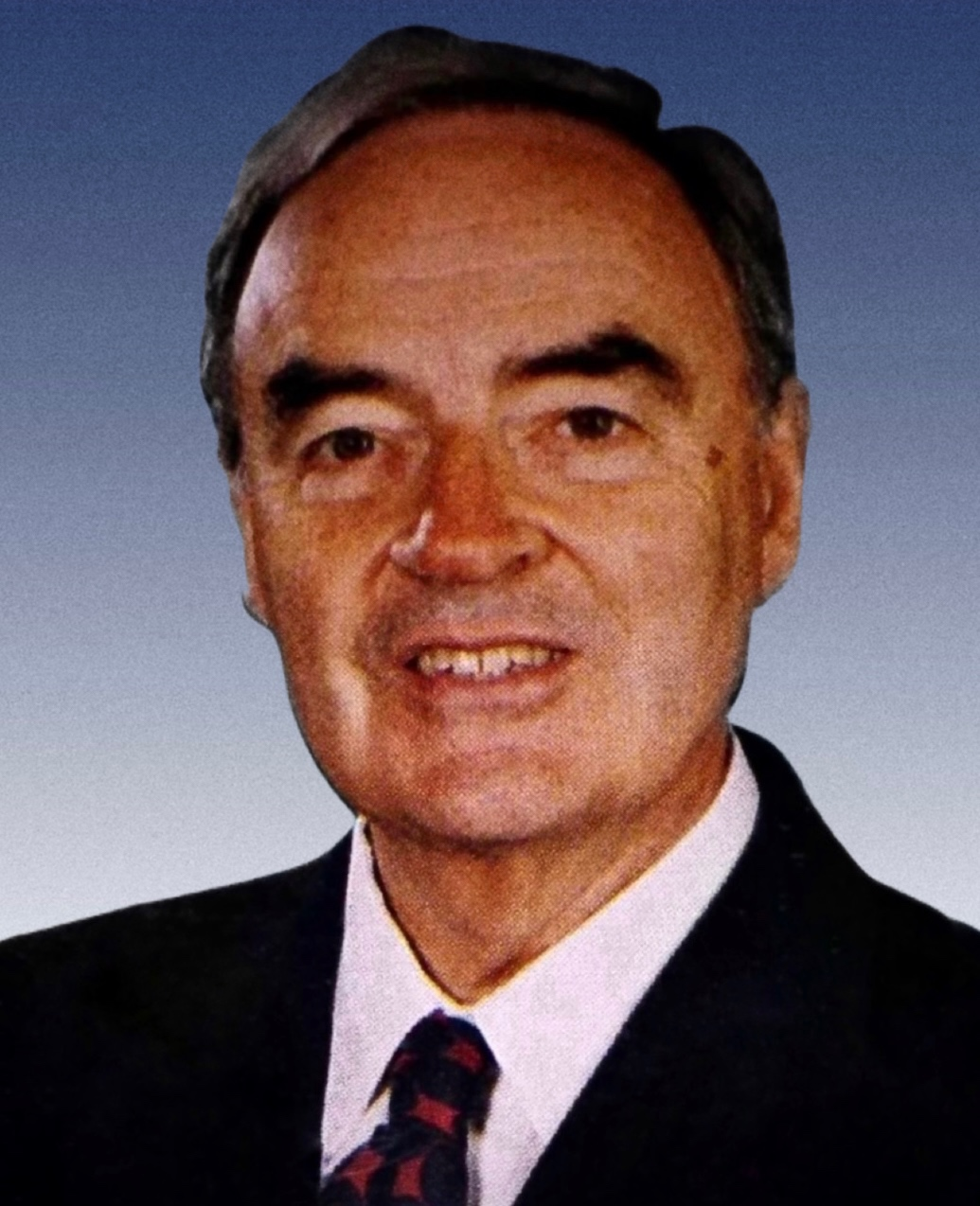
Senator
Harris Wofford
from Pennsylvania
(1991–1995)

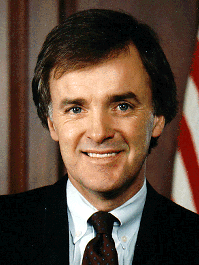
Senator and 1992 presidential candidate
Bob Kerrey
from Nebraska
(1989–2001)

== Media speculation on possible vice presidential candidates ==
=== Members of Congress ===
Senator
Bill Bradley
from New Jersey
(1979–1997)

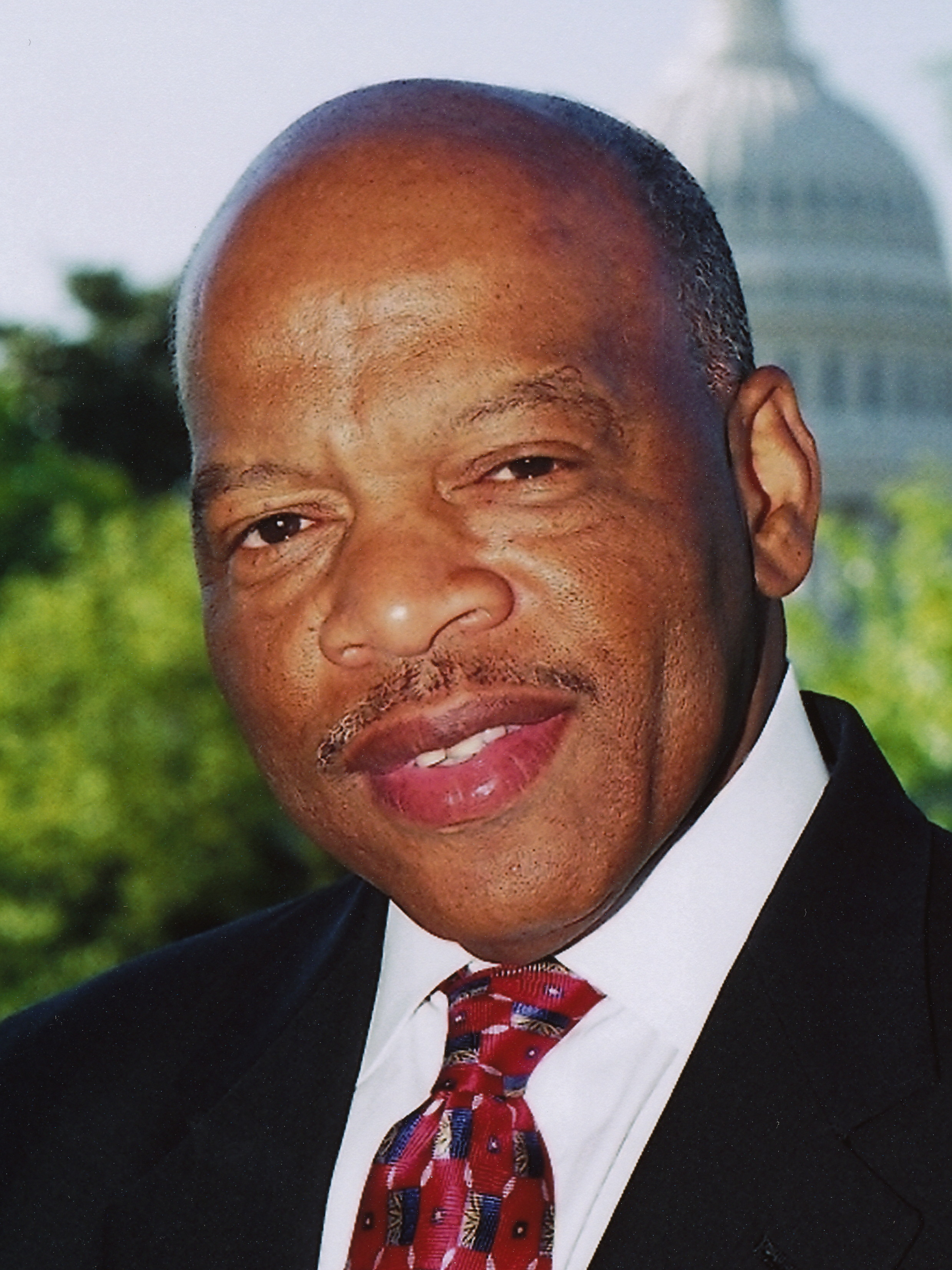
Representative
John Lewis
from Georgia
(1987–2020)

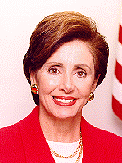
Representative
Nancy Pelosi
from California
(1987–present)

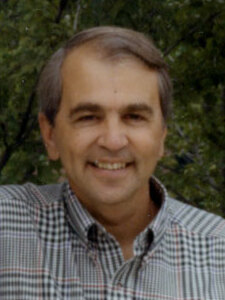
Former Senator and 1992 presidential candidate
Paul Tsongas
from Massachusetts
(1979–1985)

=== Governors ===
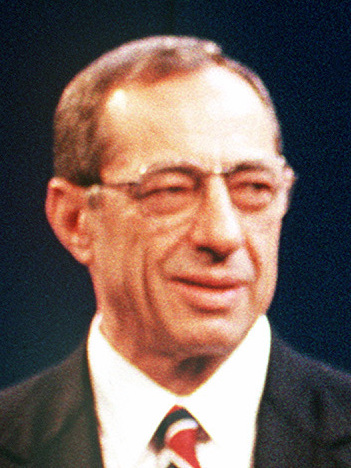
Governor
Mario Cuomo
of New York
(1983–1994)

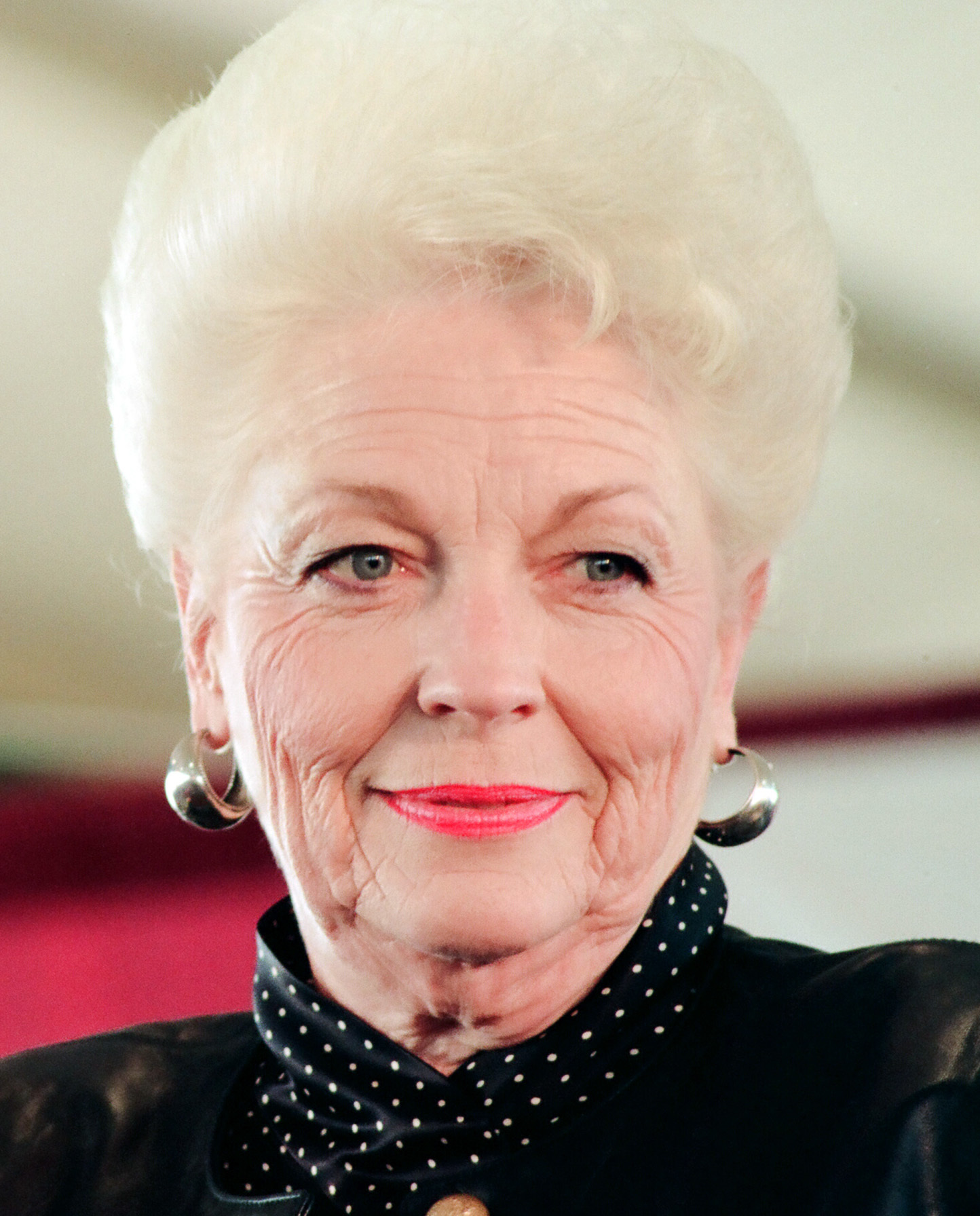
Governor
Ann Richards
of Texas
(1991–1995)

=== Other Individuals ===
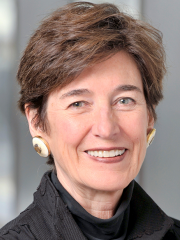
California State Treasurer
Kathleen Brown
from California
(1991–1995)

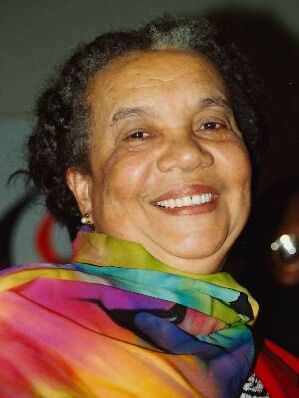
Founder of the Children's Defense Fund
Marian Wright Edelman

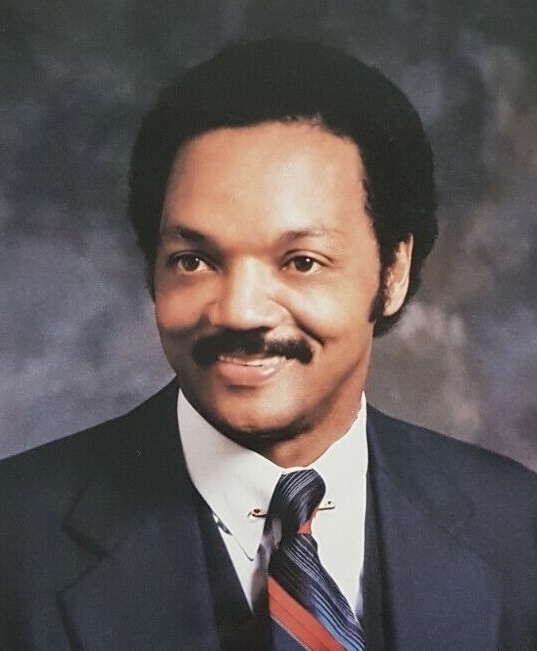
Reverend and 1984/1988 presidential candidate
Jesse Jackson
from District of Columbia

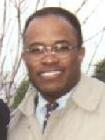
Mayor of Baltimore
Kurt Schmoke
from Maryland
(1987–1999)

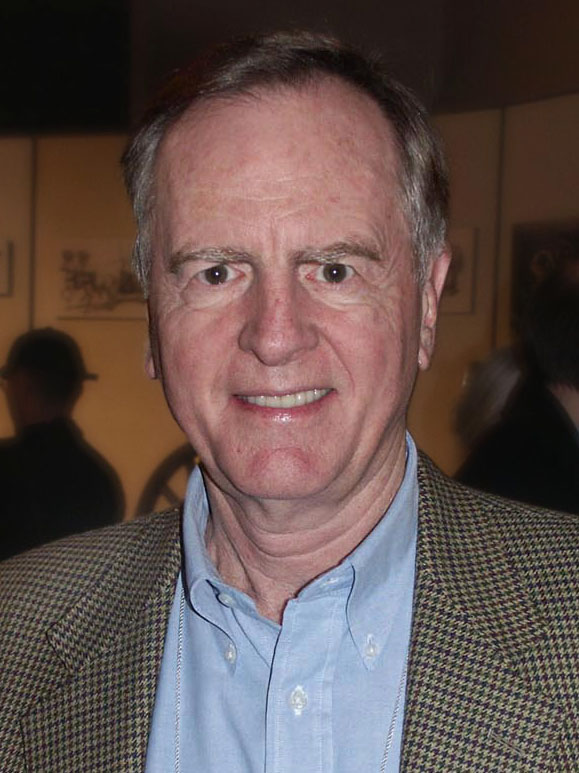
CEO of Apple Inc.
John Sculley
from California
(1983–1993)

== See also ==
- Bill Clinton 1992 presidential campaign
- 1992 Democratic Party presidential primaries
- 1992 Democratic National Convention
- 1992 United States presidential election
- List of United States major party presidential tickets
