= Christopher Commission =

Officially The Independent Commission on the Los Angeles Police Department

Independent Commission on the Los Angeles Police Department
Investigatory commission overview
- Formed: April 1991
- Dissolved: 1991
- Type: Independent commission
- Jurisdiction: Los Angeles, California
- Headquarters: Los Angeles, California
- Investigatory commission executive: Warren Christopher, Chair
- Parent Investigatory commission: Office of the Mayor of Los Angeles
- Key document: Christopher Commission Report

The Independent Commission on the Los Angeles Police Department, informally known as the Christopher Commission, was formed by then-mayor of Los Angeles Tom Bradley, in April 1991, in the wake of the Rodney King beating.

It was chaired by attorney Warren Christopher (who later became U.S. Secretary of State under President Bill Clinton). "The commission was created to conduct 'a full and fair examination of the structure and operation of the LAPD,' including its recruitment and training practices, internal disciplinary system, and citizen complaint system."

A year after the commission was formed, the officers involved in the King beating were acquitted, leading to the 1992 Los Angeles riots.

== Findings ==
The following are, verbatim, some of the commission's findings:

- There is a significant number of officers in the LAPD who repetitively use excessive force against the public and persistently ignore the written guidelines of the department regarding force.
- The failure to control these officers is a management issue that is at the heart of the problem. The documents and data that we have analyzed have all been available to the department; indeed, most of this information came from that source. The LAPD's failure to analyze and act upon these revealing data evidences a significant breakdown in the management and leadership of the Department. The Los Angeles Board of Police Commissioners, lacking investigators or other resources, failed in its duty to monitor the Department in this sensitive use of force area. The Department not only failed to deal with the problem group of officers but it often rewarded them with positive evaluations and promotions.
- We recommend a new standard of accountability....Ugly incidents will not diminish until ranking officers know they will be held responsible for what happens in their sector, whether or not they personally participate."
- The commission highlighted the problem of "repeat offenders" on the force, finding that of approximately 1,800 officers against whom an allegation of excessive force or improper tactics was made from 1986 to 1990, more than 1,400 had only one or two allegations. But 183 officers had four or more allegations, forty-four had six or more, sixteen had eight or more, and one had sixteen such allegations. Generally, the forty-four officers with six complaints or more had received positive performance evaluations that failed to record "sustained" complaints or to discuss their significance.

The Christopher Commission found that only forty-two of 2,152 allegations of excessive force from 1986 to 1990 were sustained—or less than two percent. "According to the Christopher Commission '... the complaint system is skewed against complainants.'" "The majority of investigations at that time were done by division staff, not IAD, and the commission found this seriously problematic because division investigators often failed even to interview or identify witnesses."

== In popular culture ==
- Bad Religion's song "Don't Pray on Me" cryptically references the Christopher Commission with the line "the city exploded but the Gates wouldn't open so the company asked him to quit."
- In the 3rd episode of FX's The People v OJ Simpson: American Crime Story, the Christopher Commission is mentioned by Johnnie Cochran (played by Courtney B. Vance) in the way how the Los Angeles Police see black people.
- In episode 2 of season 4 of Bosch, the Christopher Commission is mentioned.

== See also ==
- Police corruption
