= Bill Clinton 1992 presidential campaign =

American political campaign

Bill Clinton for President 1992
- Campaign: 1992 Democratic primaries 1992 U.S. presidential election
- Candidate: Bill Clinton; 40th and 42nd Governor of Arkansas (1979–1981, 1983–1992); Al Gore; U.S. Senator from Tennessee (1985–1993)
- Affiliation: Democratic Party
- Status: Announced: October 3, 1991; Presumptive nominee: June 2, 1992; Official nominee: July 16, 1992; Won election: November 3, 1992; Certification: January 6, 1993; Inaugurated: January 20, 1993
- Headquarters: Little Rock, Arkansas
- Key people: David Wilhelm (campaign manager); James Carville (chief strategist); George Stephanopoulos (senior strategist, communications director & spokesperson); Paul Begala (senior strategist); Harold M. Ickes (senior strategist); Betsey Wright (deputy campaign chair, senior researcher); Bruce Reed (deputy campaign manager for policy); Rahm Emanuel (finance director); Dee Dee Myers (media strategist); Mandy Grunwald (media strategist); David Axelrod (media strategist); Mickey Kantor (general counsel); Stan Greenberg (chief pollster)
- Slogan(s): For people for change Putting People First; It's the economy, stupid! For America, for the people
- Theme song: "Don't Stop" by Christine McVie

The 1992 presidential campaign of Bill Clinton, the then-governor of Arkansas, was announced on October 3, 1991, at the Old State House in Little Rock, Arkansas. After winning a majority of delegates in the Democratic primaries of 1992, the campaign announced that then-junior U.S. senator from Tennessee, Al Gore, would be Clinton's running mate. The Clinton–Gore ticket defeated Republican incumbent President George H. W. Bush and Vice President Dan Quayle in the presidential election on November 3, 1992, and took office as the 42nd president and 45th vice president, respectively, on January 20, 1993.

== Candidate background ==
Bill Clinton was the governor of a traditionally conservative Southern state, Arkansas. He had been viewed as a viable presidential candidate before his actual bid in 1992. During the 1988 Democratic Party presidential primaries, where George H. W. Bush, the incumbent vice president, seemed all but inevitable as the president, many turned to Clinton as the next Southern leader of the party. Clinton was seen as a potential candidate as he was a popular Democratic governor in a state that had voted for Republicans in four of the last five presidential elections. Breaking with the traditional left wing platform of the Democratic Party, Clinton espoused the ideas of the Third Way. A former chairman of the DLC, he ran as a New Democrat.

== Timeline ==
=== Primaries ===
In the wake of President George H. W. Bush's sky-high approval ratings following Operation Desert Storm, American media gave the Democratic Party little chance of winning the presidency in 1992. Early Democratic front-runners included Bill Bradley, a New Jersey senator; Jesse Jackson, who finished second in 1988; Dick Gephardt, a Missouri representative and then House Majority Leader; Al Gore, then a senator from Tennessee; and Jay Rockefeller, a senator from West Virginia. But each bowed out early; neither Bradley nor Rockefeller considered themselves ready to run, Gephardt seemed to accept Bush's re-election as a sure thing, and Gore had opted to spend more time with his family in the wake of a tragic accident that threatened the life of his young son. The most notable front-runner, Mario Cuomo, decided not to run on December 20, 1991, the final day to apply to run in the New Hampshire primary.

In the lead-up to the 1992 New Hampshire Democratic primary, the Clinton campaign was rocked by scandal when Gennifer Flowers accused Clinton of having a 12-year sexual affair. At the same time, Clinton was accused of misleading the U.S. Army Reserve to avoid service in the Vietnam War. Bill and Hillary Rodham Clinton addressed the sexual misconduct allegations in an interview by Steve Kroft on an episode of 60 Minutes aired after the Super Bowl XXVI. Although at that time the Clintons denied an affair, they admitted to have known Flowers and Bill admitted that he had caused problems in their marriage. Although Clinton lost to Paul Tsongas in the New Hampshire primary and suffered from persistent criticism over his character for the rest of the election, he won the Super Tuesday primaries. He ultimately secured the Democratic nomination after winning primaries in Illinois and Michigan, earning him the nickname "The Comeback Kid." At the same time, Bush's lead waned due to his administration's handling of the early 1990s recession and the 1992 Los Angeles riots.

=== Arsenio Hall Show appearance ===
Clinton was a guest on The Arsenio Hall Show on Wednesday June 3, 1992, the day after he secured the Democratic Party nomination. He played "Heartbreak Hotel" on the saxophone. The appearance is often considered an important moment in Clinton's political career, helping build his popularity amongst minority and young voters. Clinton's appearance on the show and subsequent media coverage of it, catapulted him ahead of Bush in the polls.

=== Running mate selection ===
In June and July 1992, speculation grew about who Clinton was going to pick as his running mate. Possible candidates included Kerrey, Indiana congressman Lee Hamilton, Missouri congressman Dick Gephardt, Tennessee senator Al Gore, New Jersey senator Bill Bradley, Florida senator Bob Graham and Pennsylvania senator Harris Wofford. On July 9, 1992, Clinton announced Gore as his running mate in the Arkansas State Mansion at Little Rock.

=== Convention ===
During the 1992 Democratic Convention, the convention hall was plagued by the fact that independent candidate Ross Perot was tied with or beating Clinton in opinion research polls. This caused a moderate turn of events at the convention to win back Perot voters from the Perot campaign. This led to the selection of such speakers such as Representative Barbara Jordan from Texas to deliver a bipartisan keynote address to the convention delegates. Also speaking was the vice-presidential nominee Al Gore who appealed to the center as he was, at the time, a Southern moderate Democrat from Tennessee.

However, on the last day the convention convened on July 16, 1992, Ross Perot dropped out of the presidential race and left a gap for both Bush and Clinton to scramble for newly undecided voters. This greatly led to the advantage of Bill Clinton who gave his nomination acceptance speech that night.

=== Election night ===
Throughout election night, Clinton over performed in rural areas of the country such as in the mountain west, winning Montana, Colorado, and New Mexico (16 electoral votes). Clinton also won rural voters in the south and mid-west, carrying states such as Missouri, Arkansas, Tennessee, Kentucky, West Virginia, Louisiana, Georgia, and Iowa (57 electoral votes).

== Campaign strategy ==
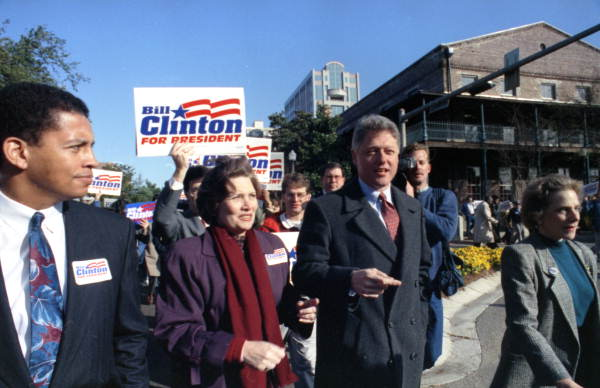
Clinton campaigning in Tallahassee during the 1992 presidential election

=== The Southern lock ===
A source of frustration for Democrats after the adoption of Richard Nixon's Southern strategy was the increasing Republican lock on the electoral votes of the Southern United States. Clinton's home of Arkansas gave Democrats hope that they could carry some Southern states and ultimately win the election. Clinton then made what even his opponents acknowledged was a master stroke by choosing Al Gore, a senator from Tennessee, as his running mate. This choice blunted a major strategy of the Bush campaign to paint Clinton and Gore as 'Northern liberals' in the mold of previous candidates George McGovern, Walter Mondale, Michael Dukakis, and, to a lesser extent, Hubert Humphrey. Additionally, Gore's prior military record removed much of the criticism Clinton had received earlier.

Besides Gore, several names were rumored to be in contention for the second spot, including Florida senator and former governor of Florida Bob Graham, Indiana congressman Lee H. Hamilton, Nebraska senator and former governor Bob Kerrey, Iowa senator Tom Harkin, and newly elected Pennsylvania senator Harris Wofford.

=== President Bush's approval ratings ===
For most of 1991, the incumbent president, George H.W. Bush, was extremely popular after the Persian Gulf War, with approval rating at times reaching as high as 90 percent. That war had helped erase the Vietnam Syndrome America had felt since the 1960s, restoring confidence in the country's ability to assert itself militarily abroad. But because of a growing public perception of an economic downturn, Bush's popularity began falling throughout late 1991, and by February 1992, his approval rating fell below 40%. Bush's approval would stay low for the rest of the campaign season.

=== Reasons for victory ===
Clinton's charisma, combined with a talented campaign staff and skilled campaign strategy, led to victory. Organizational theorists have proposed that his campaign structure adopted an effective blend of informality with clear goal definition, which allowed for structured creativity. There was also the Ross Perot factor, as he took many votes from the angry base due to Bush's breaking of the no tax pledge. Bill Clinton also focused on the economy in 1992 due to the recession and ran on school choice, balanced budget amendment, opposition to illegal immigration and support for NAFTA.

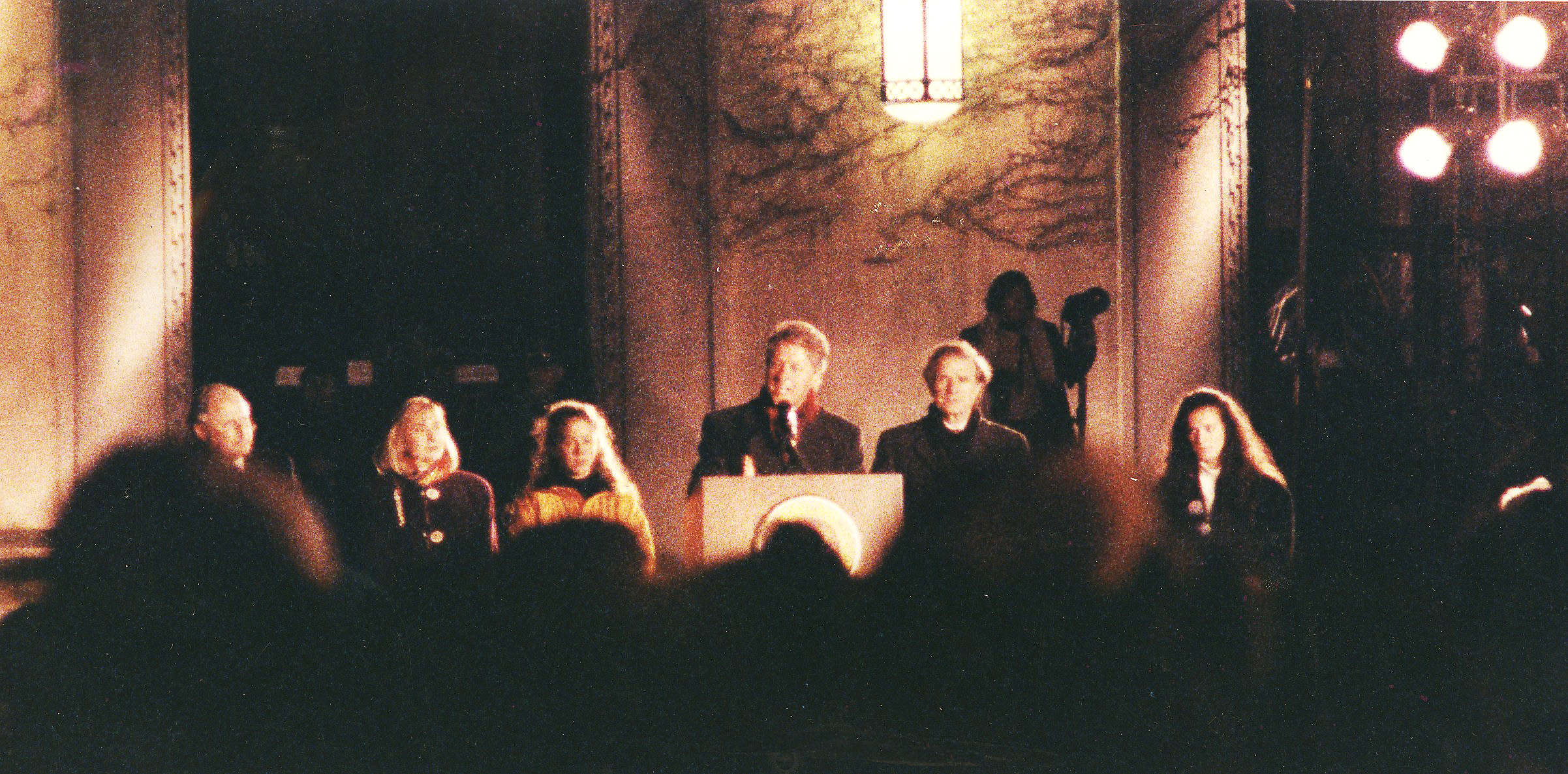
Presidential candidate Bill Clinton in front of Rackham School at the University of Michigan on October 19, 1992, flanked by Michigan Senator Carl Levin, Hillary Clinton, Chelsea Clinton and Michigan Senator Donald W. Riegle, Jr.

Outreach to ethnic American constituencies was coordinated by Christopher Hyland as Deputy National Political Director for Ethnic Constituencies; in his autobiography My Life, Clinton credited Hyland with laying the foundation for the administration's continuing engagement with ethnic communities after taking office.

== Endorsements ==
List of Bill Clinton 1992 presidential campaign endorsements

Former Government Officials

- William Denman Eberle United States Trade Representative (Republican)
- Arthur Flemming United States Secretary of Health, Education, and Welfare (Republican)
- John Frohnmayer chairman of the National Endowment for the Arts (Republican)

Former Representatives

- John B. Anderson (R-IL) (Independent since 1980)
- John Hall Buchanan Jr. (R-AL)
- Marc L. Marks (R-PA)
- Claudine Schneider (R-RI)
- Stanley R. Tupper (R-ME)

Governors

- Lowell Weicker (I-CT)

Former Governors

- Russell W. Peterson (R-DE)

State Officials

- Member of New Hampshire Senate Susan McLane (Republican)
- Former Oregon Treasurer H. Clay Myers Jr. (Republican)
- Pasadena City Council Member Bill Paparian (Republican)

Individuals

- Thomas Hoving former Director of the Metropolitan Museum of Art (Republican)
- Calvin Klein fashion designer
- George C. Lodge Harvard Professor (Republican)
- Clyde V. Prestowitz Jr. economist (Republican)
- Elizabeth Rickey anti-racism activist (Republican)
- Darryl Strawberry
- Calvin Waller lieutenant general in United States Army (Independent)

)

Businessmen

- Larry Ellison CEO of Oracle Corporation (Republican)
- Roger Johnson CEO of Western Digital (Republican)
- John Sculley CEO of Apple Inc. (Republican)
- John A. Young CEO of Hewlett-Packard (Republican)

Actors

- Lauren Bacall
- Warren Beatty
- Anette Bening
- Lloyd Bridges
- Dixie Carter (Republican)
- Glenn Close
- Geena Davis
- Carol Channing
- Danny Devito
- Richard Dreyfuss
- Jill Eikenberry
- Carrie Fisher
- Teri Garr
- Daryl Hannah
- Buck Henry
- Dustin Hoffman
- Gregory Hines
- Anne-Marie Johnson
- Christine Lahti
- Jack Lemmon
- Ali MacGraw
- Elizabeth Peña
- Rhea Perlman
- Michelle Pfeiffer
- Annie Potts
- Sheryl Lee Ralph
- Burt Reynolds
- John Ritter
- William Schallert
- Cybill Shepherds
- Andrew Shue
- Ron Silver
- Christian Slater
- Mary Steenburgen
- Meshach Taylor
- Courtney Thorne-Smith
- Michael Tucker
- Kathleen Turner
- Paul Winfield

Comedians

- Chevy Chase
- Whoopi Goldberg
- Richard Lewis
- Elaine May
- Paula Poundstone
- Martin Short

Filmmakers

- Alan and Marilyn Bergman, film composers
- Peter Guber, producer
- Callie Khouri, screenwriter
- Mike Nichols, director
- Linda Bloodworth Thomason, screenwriter

Musicians

- Michael Bolton, singer
- Judy Collins, singer
- Don Henley, singer and drummer
- Bruce Hornsby, pianist
- Quincy Jones, record producer
- Wynton Marsalis, trumpeter
- Kathy Mattea, singer
- T. S. Monk, drummer
- Linda Ronstadt, singer
- Barbra Streisand, singer
- Dionne Warwick, singer
- Grover Washington Jr., saxophonist
- Young MC

== See also ==
- 1992 Democratic Party presidential primaries
- 1992 Democratic Party vice presidential candidate selection
- 1992 Democratic National Convention
- 1992 United States presidential election
- George H. W. Bush 1992 presidential campaign
- Ross Perot 1992 presidential campaign
- Bill Clinton 1996 presidential campaign
- Sister Souljah moment
