= Sovereign State of the Bektashi Order =

Proposed independent city-state in Europe

Sovereign State of the Bektashi Order Shteti Sovran i Urdhrit Bektashi (Albanian)
- Status: Proposed
- Capital: Sovereign State of the Bektashi Order (city-state); 41°19′53″N 19°51′00″E
- Official languages: Albanian
- Religion: Bektashi Islam (state religion)
- Demonym: Bektashi

Government
  - Dedebaba: Baba Mondi

Area
  - Total: 0.11 km^{2} (0.042 sq mi)
- Today part of: Tirana, Albania

The Sovereign State of the Bektashi Order (Albanian: Shteti Sovran i Urdhrit Bektashi; pronounced [ʃtɛti sɔvɾan i uɾðɾit bɛktaʃi]) is a proposed European microstate and city-state that would be enclaved entirely within Tirana, the capital of Albania, at the current World Headquarters of the Bektashi. If established, it would be smaller than the Vatican City and become the sovereign state with the smallest land area in the world, with a total land area of 11 hectares (27 acres).

Plans for the creation of the state have been discussed by Albanian prime minister Edi Rama and supported by the leader of the Bektashi Order, Baba Mondi, with the former stating that more details for the creation of the state will be revealed in the near future. Following the Vatican City model, the prospective state would grant citizenship solely to Bektashi clerics and government officials. Drafting of legislation to create the new state within Albania began in September 2024. The legislation would need approval from the Albanian Parliament via an amendment to the Constitution of Albania.

== History ==
The Bektashi Order is a Sufi order, originating in the 13th-century Ottoman Empire. Origins of the community point towards the Kızılbaş and Alevism. As the Janissaries became a dominant force in Ottoman politics, they adopted Bektashism as the corps' religion, while Sunni Islam dominated the Muslim millet. The Bektashis have faced persecution from Shiites and Sunnis who consider the Bektashis as heretics rather than Muslims. In 1826, Mahmud II abolished the Janissaries after the Auspicious Incident, and subsequently passed a fatwa banning the Bektashi Order. Tanzimat reformers refused to consider granting Alevis or Bektashis their own millet. Alevis and Bektashis continued to practice their religion without state sanction and with harassment from authorities. Many stuck to rural regions with minimal government control, such as the Eastern Anatolian and Albanian highlands. Following the dissolution of the Ottoman Empire and the formation of the secular Republic of Turkey, President Mustafa Kemal Atatürk shut down all tekkes, including the Bektashi Order in 1925. Consequently, the Bektashi leadership moved their headquarters from Turkey to Tirana. Bektashis and Alevis are currently unrecognized as religious minorities by the Constitution of Turkey and the Directorate of Religious Affairs.

The Bektashi Order's popularity diminished under former Albanian communist leader Enver Hoxha, who banned religion in 1967. Under Hoxha, the government built warehouses on portions of land belonging to the World Headquarters of the Bektashi. After the fall of communism in Albania, the Bektashis lost further land when private developers built homes on the edge of their property without permission. In 2023, Bektashis were estimated to make up about 5% of Albania's population. Turkish Bektashi populations are harder to estimate due to their conflation with the Alevi community, which made up around 15% of the Turkish population in 2006.

On 21 September 2024, Albanian prime minister Edi Rama announced plans to create the Sovereign State of the Bektashi Order as a gesture of religious tolerance and to promote more positive views of Islam in Albania and the rest of the world.

== Government and recognition ==
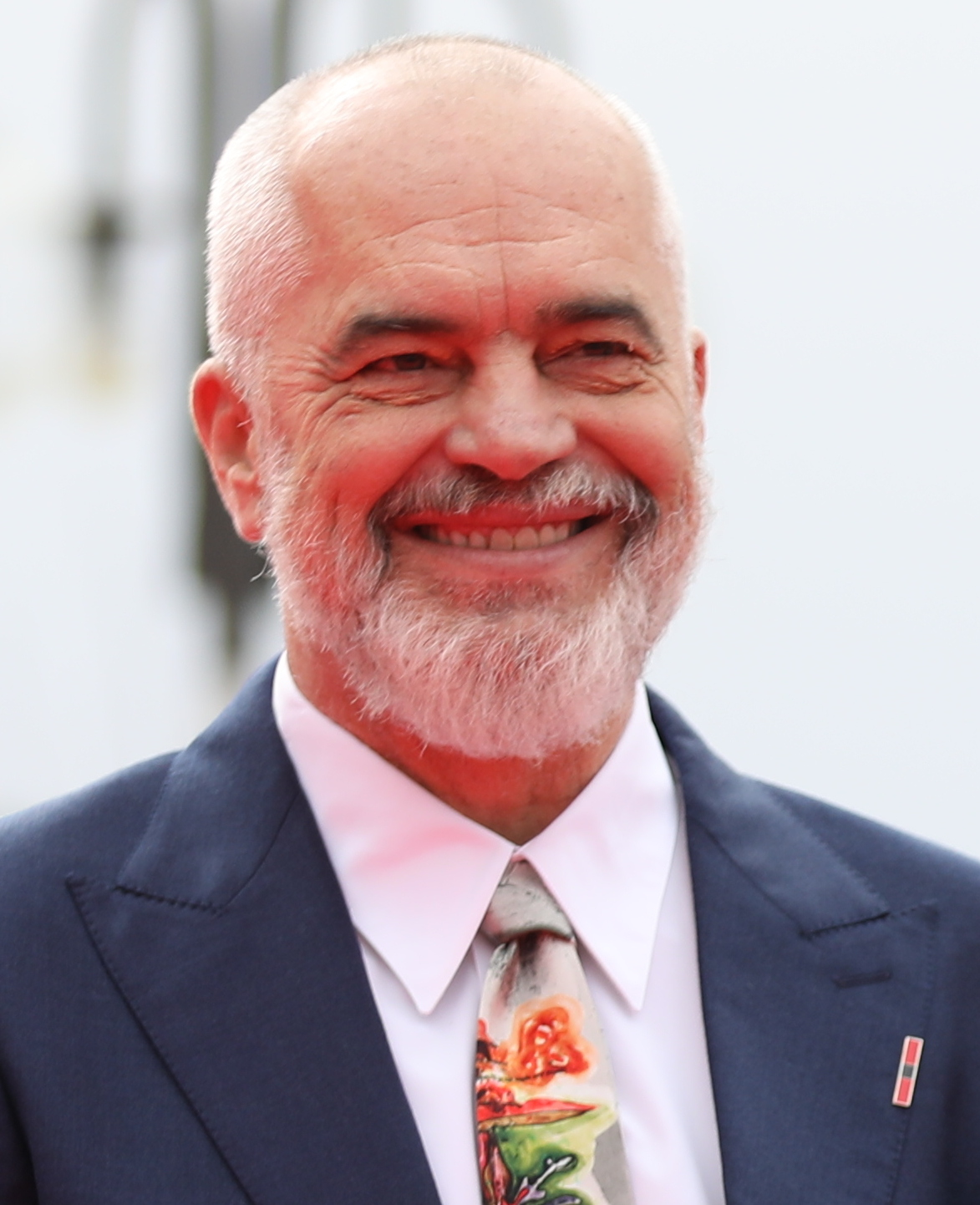
Edi Rama, the current Prime Minister of Albania, announced plans to create the state in 2024.

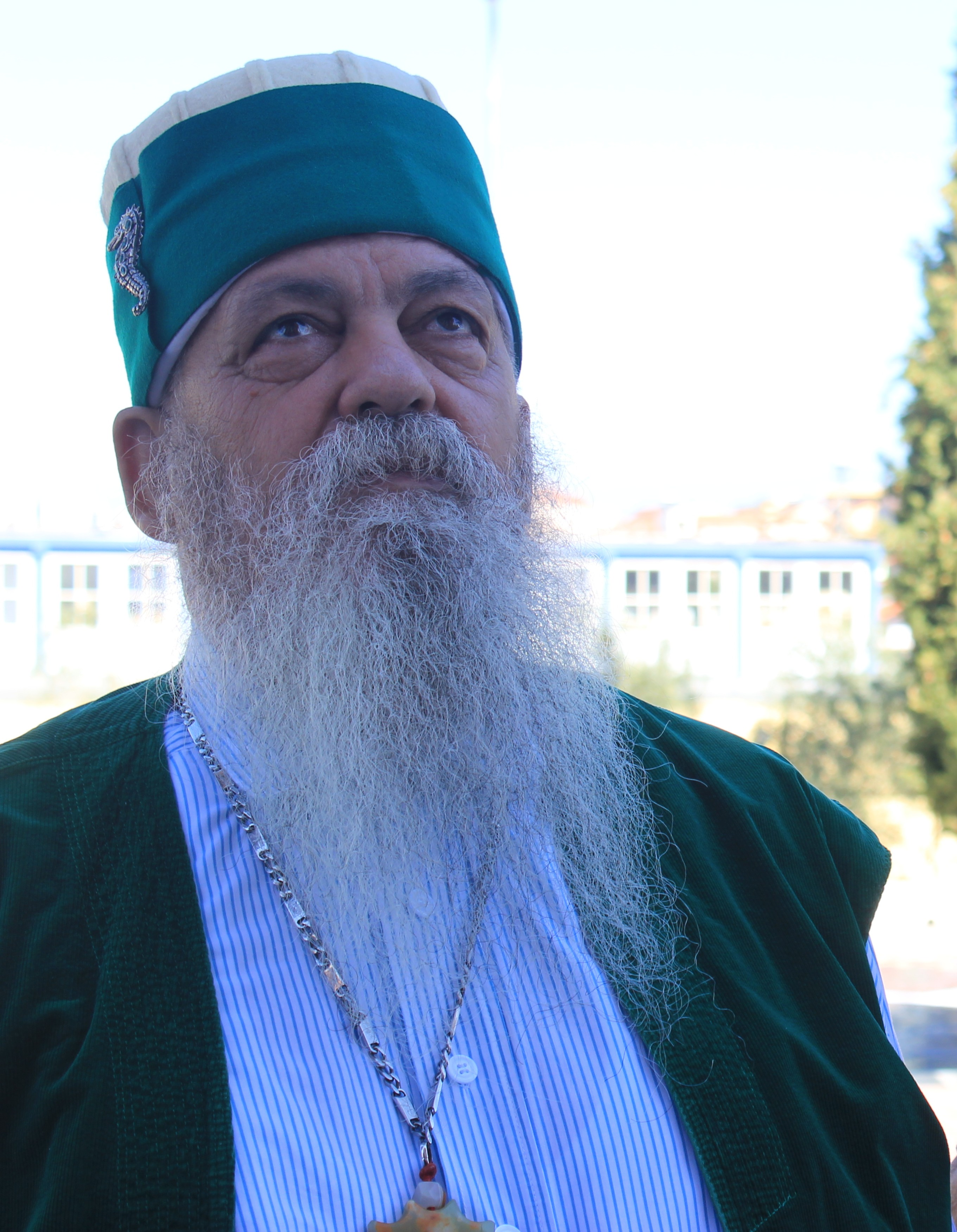
Baba Mondi, the current Bektashi Dedebaba, is the planned head of state.

The creation of the state would need approval from the Albanian Parliament. It would also require an amendment to the Constitution of Albania, as Article 1(2) says "The Republic of Albania is a unitary and indivisible state." Two-thirds of lawmakers would need to approve the amendment.

Baba Mondi, the Bektashi Dedebaba, stated that he would serve as the head of the country in his role as a spiritual leader while emphasizing that the state, if created, would not maintain an army, border guards, or courts. The state is planned to allow the consumption of alcohol and to allow women to dress however they please, in contrast to more conservative Islamic theocracies.

In an interview after the announcement, Baba Mondi stated that citizenship in the new state would be limited to clerics and those engaged in the administration of the state, akin to how citizenship is structured in the Vatican City. He also expressed his belief that securing sovereign status would uplift the Bektashi Order and enhance its ability to fight radical ideologies that have affected the Muslim world and the international community. The passport is planned to be green, a color deeply symbolic in Islam.

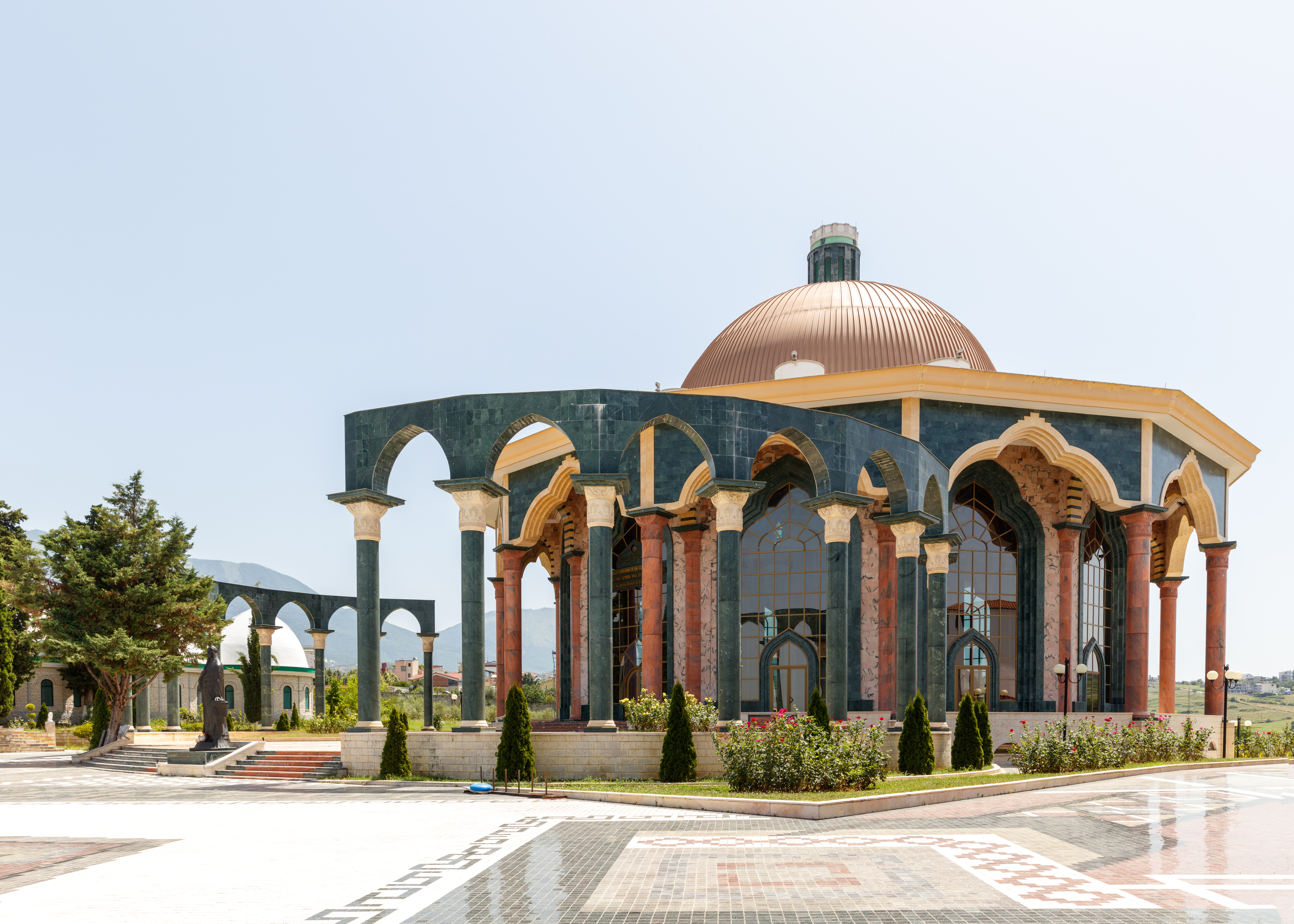
The Bektashi headquarters is where the country is planned to be located.

Baba Mondi stated in an interview not long after the announcement that many countries, especially those confronting religious extremism or tensions, have a vested interest in backing peaceful and moderate religious movements like the Bektashi Order. He suggested that countries such as Saudi Arabia, the UAE, and Qatar may see value in supporting the Order's peaceful Sufi Shia tradition to reinforce moderate interpretations of Islam. Additionally, he suggested that states facing internal challenges with militant Islam, such as China, could align with the Bektashi Order as a means of countering extremism without fueling division. The Order believes that over time, the international community will recognize the benefits of amplifying moderate voices and view the Sovereign State of the Bektashi Order as a valuable contributor to global efforts promoting peace, tolerance, and dialogue.

Albanian journalist Arbër Hitaj and security expert Ilir Kulla have said that the planned state would likely be similar to the Sovereign Military Order of Malta (SMOM). The SMOM, a Catholic religious order, is recognized as a sovereign entity under international law and enters into diplomatic relations with sovereign states, but unlike the Vatican City, it does not have territory besides its headquarters and other buildings which are considered extraterritorial.

Pope Francis, then-head of the Catholic Church and sovereign of Vatican City, met with Baba Mondi in January 2025 and was reported to support the creation of the Sovereign State of the Bektashi Order. In 2026, United States envoy Paolo Zampolli stated that the creation of the Bektashi state should be the decision of the Albanian people, and that the international community should respect whichever decision is made. The Bektashi Order also began international outreach, establishing relations with the United States, France, and Belgium.

== Opposition ==
There has been some opposition to the proposed state. The Muslim Community of Albania called the initiative "a dangerous precedent for the future of the country" and criticized the fact that it had not been discussed with religious communities before being proposed. Representatives of the Alevi-Bektashi Federation released a statement via the Azeri-Turkish network Haber Global stating that "Bektashism and [a] religious state are concepts incompatible with each other." Albanians interviewed by Euronews cited economic concerns and a fear of Albania turning into an "Islamic country" as criticisms about the planned Bektashi state. Additionally, Albanians interviewed by Balkan Insight characterized the planned state as a distraction from alleged domestic scandals created by Edi Rama in an attempt to gain favorable news coverage.

Besnik Sinani, a research fellow at the Center for Muslim Theology at Tübingen University, said the comparison to Vatican City "does not withstand historical scrutiny" and called the proposal "an unprecedented case of contemporary religious engineering." He further said he believed it would "disrupt the historical arrangements of the relationship between religion and state in Albania". Olsi Jazexhi, an assistant professor at the International Islamic University Malaysia, has seen the idea of the creation of a Bektashi state as an attempt by Israel and Edi Rama to create a Zionist form of Islam in the Balkans which would be politically hostile to Iran, Hamas, and Turkey while being politically loyal to Israel.
