= Clyde V. Prestowitz Jr. =

American government official

Clyde Prestowitz (born 1941) is the founder and President of the Economic Strategy Institute. He formerly served as counselor to the Secretary of Commerce in the Reagan Administration. He is a labor economist. Prestowitz has written for Foreign Affairs.

== Early life and education ==
Prestowitz was born to a family with a conservative Republican and evangelical Christian background and earned a B.A. with honors from Swarthmore College; an M.A. in East-West Policies and Economics from the East–West Center of the University of Hawaii; and an M.B.A. from the Wharton School of the University of Pennsylvania.

== 2020 US Presidential Campaign ==
In 2020, Prestowitz, along with over 130 other former Republican national security officials, signed a statement that asserted that President Trump was unfit to serve another term, and "To that end, we are firmly convinced that it is in the best interest of our nation that Vice President Joe Biden be elected as the next President of the United States, and we will vote for him."

== Books and articles ==
- Our Incoherent China Policy: The proposed Trans-Pacific Partnership is bad economics, and even worse as containment of China. American Prospect Fall 2015
- Could Germany save eurozone by leaving it? CNN May 30, 2012
- The Betrayal of American Prosperity: Free Market Delusions, America's Decline, and How We Must Compete in the Post-Dollar Era, 2010 ISBN 978-1-4391-1979-2
- Three Billion New Capitalists: The Great Shift of Wealth And Power to the East, 2005
- The South Korean Firehose The Globalist July 25, 2005
- Don't Pester Europe on Genetically Modified Food The New York Times Op-Ed January 24, 2003
- Rogue Nation - American Unilateralism and The Failure of Good Intentions, 2003
- Trading Places - How We Are Giving Our Future to Japan and How to Reclaim It, 1993

== Multimedia ==
- The World Turned Upside Down: The Impact of the Return of India and China to their Historical Global Weight MIT World Video - 04-04-06
- In Depth: Tuff Enough? Can the US continue to command the attention of world markets when the dollar is dropping and free trade is flourishing? PBS' Foreign Exchange with Fareed Zakaria, aired on August 4, 2006. _{Transcript}
- Three Billion New Capitalists book interview on ABC Radio Australia, July 11, 2006
