= Tekka =

Condiment

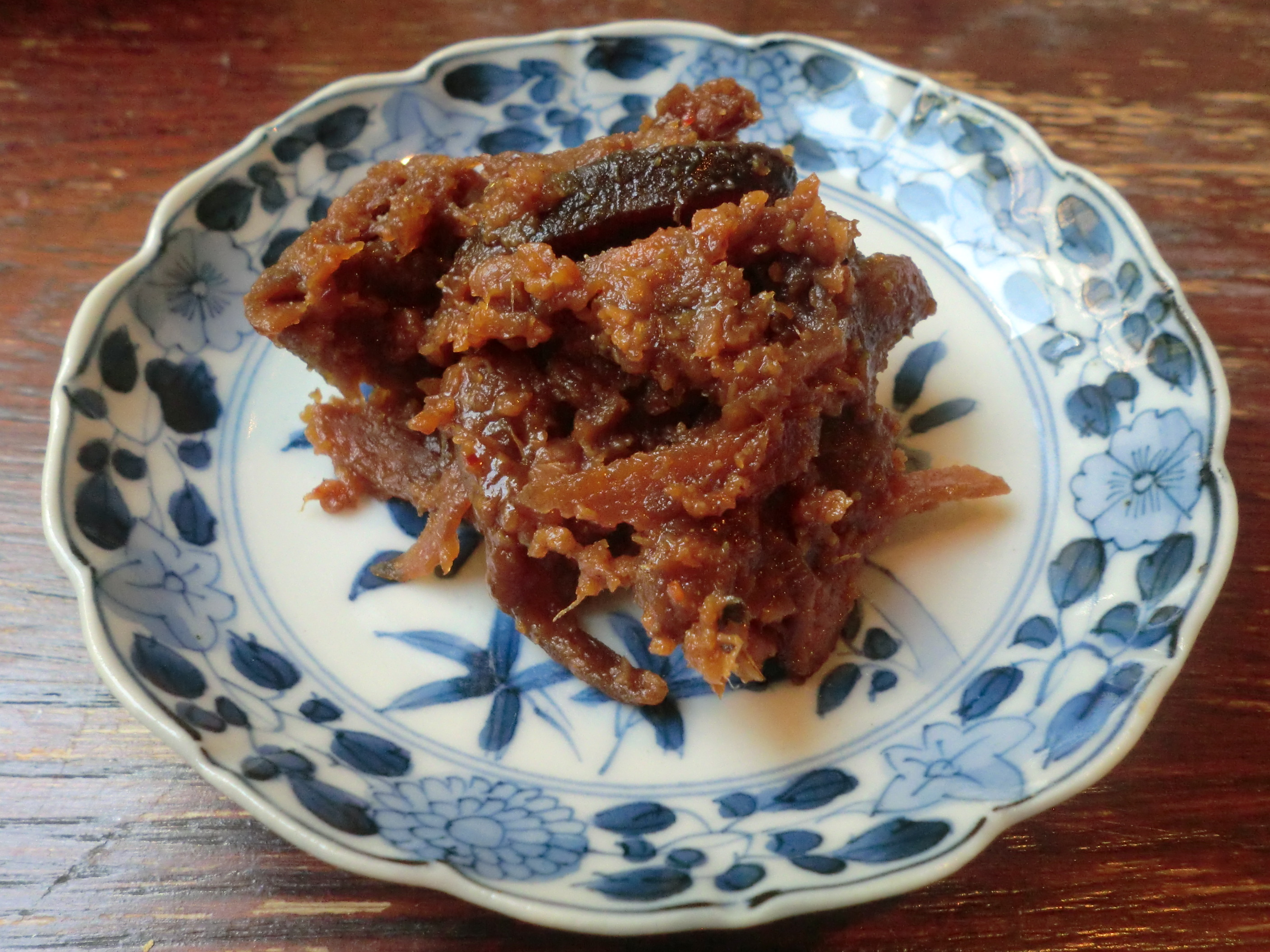
Tekka

Tekka is a miso condiment that consists of a number of root vegetables (greater burdock roots, carrots, ginger root, and lotus root) which have been stir-fried and boiled to a concentrated powder. Traditional preparation time used to be 16 hours (on a low fire), yet speedier preparation is possible.
