= List of Indian state symbols =

This is a list of the symbols of the states and union territories of India. Each state and union territory has a unique set of official symbols, usually a state emblem, an animal, a bird, a flower and a tree. A second animal (fish, butterfly, reptile, aquatic animal or heritage animal) sometimes appears, as do fruits and other plants, and there are some state songs and state mottos. Several states now also maintain a dedicated stand-alone article of their own state symbols (linked under each heading below via {{main}}), which generally carry fuller sourcing, bilingual naming and scientific names; this master list follows the same Title/Symbol/Image/Notes format for consistency and transcludes those articles' tables directly where available.

== States ==
=== Andhra Pradesh ===
| Title | Symbol | Image | Notes |
|---|---|---|---|
| State emblem | Emblem of Andhra Pradesh ఆంధ్ర రాష్ట్ర అధికారిక చిహ్నం Āndhra rāṣṭra adhikārika cihnaṁ | | Adopted in 1956, the emblem depicts a Poorna Kumbam (a broad-based, narrow-necked ceremonial vessel modelled on the Amaravati Stupa Kalasha) within an ornamented circular frame, with the national emblem and the motto Satyameva Jayate in Devanagari at the base. |
| State motto | Satyameva Jayate సత్యమేవ జయతే Satyamēva jayatē Truth Alone Triumphs | | The national motto of India, drawn from the Mundaka Upanishad and inscribed in Telugu transliteration on the state emblem. |
| State song | Maa Telugu Thalliki మా తెలుగు తల్లికి Maa Telugu Taliki; To Our Mother Telugu | | Written by Sankarambadi Sundaraachari and first sung by Suryakumari for the 1942 Telugu film Deena Bandhu, the song personifies the Telugu people as Telugu Thalli (Mother Telugu) and opens school and government functions across the state. |
| State language | Telugu తెలుగు | | A Dravidian language and one of the classical languages designated by the Government of India, Telugu is the official language of Andhra Pradesh and Telangana and one of the most-spoken native languages in the world. |
| State animal | Blackbuck కృష్ణజింక; Kr̥ṣṇajiṅka; Antilope cervicapra | | An antelope noted for its speed, with males showing dark brown-to-black upperparts contrasting with white underparts and eye-rings; darkness of coat increases with age. |
| State bird | Rose-ringed parakeet రామచిలుక; Rāmaciluka | | A crow-sized parrot with a distinctive rose-pink collar in the male, popular in Telugu poetry and folklore as a symbol of good fortune and ideal companionship. |
| State fish | Striped snakehead కొర్రమీను Korramīnu | | A fast-growing, air-breathing cyprinid popular in Andhra cuisine and suited to intensive aquaculture owing to its excellent-tasting, largely boneless flesh. |
| State flower | Jasmine మల్లె పువ్వు Malle puvvu | | Declared the state flower in 2018, jasmine's fragrance is said to symbolise the state's aspiration to spread positivity and knowledge. |
| State fruit | Banginapalli mango బంగినపల్లి మామిడి కాయ; Baṅginapalli māmiḍi kāya | | Grown around Banganapalle in Nandyal district, this variety occupies about 70% of the state's mango-growing area and received a geographical indication tag on 3 May 2017. |
| State tree | Neem వేప చెట్టు Vēpa ceṭṭu | | Valued for its air-purifying and medicinal properties, symbolising the state's stated aim of transparent governance. |
| State sport | Kabaddi చెడుగుడు Ceḍuguḍu | | A contact team sport of ancient Indian origin, locally called chedugudu in Andhra Pradesh. |
| State dance | Kuchipudi కూచిపూడి నృత్యం Kūcipūḍi nr̥tyaṁ | | One of eight classical dance forms recognised by India's Ministry of Culture, originating from the village of Kuchipudi as a dance-drama rooted in the Natya Shastra. |

=== Arunachal Pradesh ===
| Title | Symbol | Image | Notes |
|---|---|---|---|
| State emblem | Emblem of Arunachal Pradesh | | |
| State motto | Satyameva Jayate सत्यमेव जयते Truth Alone Triumphs | | The national motto of India, from the Mundaka Upanishad. |
| State animal | Mithun; Bos frontalis | | A semi-domesticated bovine of the eastern Himalayan foothills, central to Arunachali social and ceremonial life. |
| State bird | Great hornbill Buceros bicornis | | A large frugivorous hornbill of Arunachal's forests, culturally significant to several of the state's tribal communities. |
| State fish | Golden mahseer Tor putitora | | A large, IUCN-threatened cyprinid of Himalayan rivers, prized as a game fish. |
| State flower | Foxtail orchid | | An epiphytic orchid with dense, fragrant flower spikes, common across the north-eastern states. |
| State tree | Hollong; Dipterocarpus macrocarpus | | A tall hardwood tree of the region's evergreen forests, also the state tree of neighbouring Assam. |

=== Bihar ===
| Title | Symbol | Image | Notes |
|---|---|---|---|
| State emblem | Emblem of Bihar | | |
| State song | Mere Bharat Ke Kanthahar; The Garland of My India | | |
| State festival | Chhath Mahaparva छठ महापर्व | | A major Hindu folk festival dedicated to the sun god, marked by rigorous multi-day fasting and river or pond worship. |
| State foundation day | Bihar Day (22 March) | | |
| State animal | Gaur; Bos gaurus | | The gaur, or Indian bison, is the largest extant bovine and inhabits the sal forests of southern Bihar. |
| State bird | House sparrow Passer domesticus | | Declared the state bird in 2013 amid concerns over declining urban sparrow populations. |
| State fish | Walking catfish Clarias batrachus | | An air-breathing catfish tolerant of low-oxygen waters, widespread in Bihar's ponds and wetlands. |
| State flower | Marigold; Tagetes | | |
| State tree | Peepal; Ficus religiosa | | A sacred fig widely planted near temples and used in traditional medicine. |
| State fruit | Mango; Mangifera indica | | |

=== Chhattisgarh ===
| Title | Symbol | Image | Notes |
|---|---|---|---|
| State emblem | Emblem of Chhattisgarh | | |
| State motto | Satyameva Jayate सत्यमेव जयते Truth Alone Triumphs | | |
| State song | Arpa Pairi Ke Dhar अरपा पईरी के धार; The Streams of Arpa and Pairi | | Adopted as the official state song in 2019, played after Vande Mataram to mark the start of assembly sessions. |
| State foundation day | Chhattisgarh Rajyotsava छत्तीसगढ़ राज्योत्सव (1 November) | | |
| State animal | Wild water buffalo बन भईसा Bubalus arnee | | A critically endangered wild bovine, with Chhattisgarh's Udanti sanctuary among its last Indian refuges. |
| State bird | Common hill myna पहारी मईना Gracula religiosa | | |
| State flower | French marigold चंदैनी गोंदा Tagetes patula | | |
| State tree | Sal सरई; Shorea robusta | | A major timber hardwood of central India's dry deciduous forests. |
| State fish | Walking catfish मोंगरी मछरी Clarias batrachus | | |

=== Goa ===
| Title | Symbol | Image | Notes |
|---|---|---|---|
| State emblem | Emblem of Goa | | |
| State motto | सर्वे भद्राणि पश्यन्तु मा कश्चिद् दुःखमाप्नुयात् Sarve bhadrāṇi paśyantu mā kaścid duḥkhamāpnuyāt May everyone see goodness, may none suffer any pain | | |
| State song | Namaste Sada Vatsale Matrubhume; Prayer to Motherland | | |
| State animal | Gaur; Bos gaurus | | Found in Goa's Bondla Wildlife Sanctuary and surrounding forests. |
| State bird | Flame-throated bulbul Pycnonotus gularis | | A songbird endemic to the southern Western Ghats. |
| State fish | Grey mullet Shevtto (Konkani); Mugil cephalus | | Declared for its year-round abundance in Goa's estuaries. |
| State flower | Frangipani; Plumeria rubra | | |
| State heritage tree | Coconut palm Cocos nucifera | | |
| State tree | Matti; Terminalia crenulata | | |

=== Gujarat ===
| Title | Symbol | Image | Notes |
|---|---|---|---|
| State emblem | Uses the National Emblem of India | | |
| State motto | Satyameva Jayate सत्यमेव जयते Truth Alone Triumphs | | |
| State song | Jai Jai Garavi Gujarat; Victory to Proud Gujarat! | | |
| State animal | Asiatic lion Panthera leo persica | | Survives today only in Gujarat, restricted to the Gir National Park and adjoining areas. |
| State bird | Greater flamingo Phoenicopterus roseus | | Winters at Gujarat's Nal Sarovar Bird Sanctuary, Khijadiya Bird Sanctuary and Flamingo City. |
| State fish | Blackspotted croaker Ghol | | Declared state fish at the Global Fisheries Conference India 2023 in Ahmedabad. |
| State flower | Marigold; Tagetes | | |
| State tree | Banyan tree Ficus benghalensis | | |

=== Haryana ===
| Title | Symbol | Image | Notes |
|---|---|---|---|
| State emblem | Emblem of Haryana | | |
| State motto | Satyameva Jayate; Truth Alone Triumphs | | |
| State anthem | Jai Jai Jai Haryana; Victory to Haryana | | |
| State animal | Blackbuck; Antilope cervicapra | | |
| State bird | Black francolin Francolinus francolinus | | |
| State fish | Orangefin labeo Labeo calbasu | | |
| State flower | Lotus; Nelumbo nucifera | | |
| State fruit | Mango; Mangifera indica | | |
| State tree | Peepal; Ficus religiosa | | |
| State sport | Wrestling | | |

=== Himachal Pradesh ===
| Title | Symbol | Image | Notes |
|---|---|---|---|
| State emblem | Emblem of Himachal Pradesh | | |
| State motto | Satyameva Jayate सत्यमेव जयते Truth Alone Triumphs | | |
| State animal | Snow leopard Panthera uncia | | A high-altitude big cat of the Himalayan trans-boundary ranges, classified Vulnerable by the IUCN. |
| State bird | Western tragopan Tragopan melanocephalus | | A rare, richly plumed pheasant found in the state's subalpine conifer forests. |
| State fish | Golden mahseer Tor putitora | | |
| State flower | Pink rhododendron Rhododendron campanulatum | | |
| State tree | Deodar; Cedrus deodara | | A long-lived Himalayan cedar considered sacred in local tradition and widely used in construction. |

=== Jharkhand ===
| Title | Symbol | Image | Notes |
|---|---|---|---|
| State emblem | Emblem of Jharkhand | | |
| State motto | Satyameva Jayate सत्यमेव जयते Truth Alone Triumphs | | |
| State foundation day | Jharkhand Day (15 November) | | Marks Jharkhand's creation as a separate state on 15 November 2000. |
| State animal | Indian elephant Elephas maximus indicus | | |
| State bird | Asian koel Eudynamys scolopaceus | | |
| State fish | Desi Magur; Clarias magur | | Declared the state fish in November 2025. |
| State flower | Palash; Butea monosperma | | |
| State tree | Sal; Shorea robusta | | |

=== Madhya Pradesh ===
| Title | Symbol | Image | Notes |
|---|---|---|---|
| State emblem | Emblem of Madhya Pradesh | | |
| State motto | Satyameva Jayate सत्यमेव जयते Truth Alone Triumphs | | |
| State song | Mera Madhya Pradesh; My Madhya Pradesh | | |
| State animal | Barasingha; Rucervus duvaucelii | | A swamp deer once widespread across central India, now largely confined to Kanha National Park. |
| State bird | Indian paradise flycatcher Terpsiphone paradisi | | |
| State fish | Mahseer; Tor tor | | |
| State flower | Madonna lily Lilium candidum | | |
| State tree | Banyan tree Ficus benghalensis | | |

=== Maharashtra ===
| Title | Symbol | Image | Notes |
|---|---|---|---|
| State emblem | Emblem of Maharashtra | | |
| State motto | प्रतिपच्चंद्रलेखेव वर्धिष्णुर्विश्व वंदिता महाराष्ट्रस्य राज्यस्य मुद्रा भद्राय राजते | | Adapted from the Rajmudra (royal seal) of the 17th-century Maratha ruler Chhatrapati Shivaji. |
| State song | Jai Jai Maharashtra Majha; Glory to My Maharashtra | | |
| State foundation day | Maharashtra Day (1 May) | | |
| State animal | Indian giant squirrel Ratufa indica | | |
| State bird | Yellow-footed green pigeon Treron phoenicoptera | | |
| State butterfly | Blue mormon Papilio agenor polymnestor | | Declared in 2015, making Maharashtra the first Indian state to designate an official state butterfly. |
| State fish | Silver pomfret Pampus argenteus | | Declared state fish in 2023. |
| State flower | Pride of India / Jarul; Lagerstroemia speciosa | | |
| State tree | Mango; Mangifera indica | | |

=== Manipur ===
| Title | Symbol | Image | Notes |
|---|---|---|---|
| State emblem | Emblem of Manipur | | |
| State motto | Kanglasha ꯀꯪꯂꯥꯁꯥ The Dragon Lord | | |
| State song | Sana Leibak Manipur; Manipur, Land of Gold | | |
| State animal | Sangai; Rucervus eldii eldii | | A brow-antlered deer subspecies endemic to Manipur's Keibul Lamjao National Park, the only floating national park in the world. |
| State bird | Nongin; Syrmaticus humiae | | |
| State fish | Pengba; Osteobrama belangeri | | |
| State flower | Siroi lily Lilium mackliniae | | Endemic to Manipur's Siroi Hills. |
| State tree | Uningthou; Phoebe hainesiana | | |

=== Meghalaya ===
| Title | Symbol | Image | Notes |
|---|---|---|---|
| State emblem | Emblem of Meghalaya | | A new emblem was adopted in January 2022, replacing an earlier seal based on the national emblem of India. |
| State motto | Satyameva Jayate सत्यमेव जयते Truth Alone Triumphs | | |
| State animal | Clouded leopard Neofelis nebulosa | | |
| State bird | Hill myna Gracula religiosa | | |
| State flower | Lady's slipper orchid Paphiopedilum insigne | | |
| State tree | Gamhar; Gmelina arborea | | |

=== Mizoram ===
| Title | Symbol | Image | Notes |
|---|---|---|---|
| State emblem | Uses the National Emblem of India | | |
| State motto | Satyameva Jayate सत्यमेव जयते Truth Alone Triumphs | | |
| State animal | Himalayan serow Capricornis thar | | |
| State bird | Mrs. Hume's pheasant Syrmaticus humiae | | |
| State fish | Burmese kingfish (Ngahvang); Semiplotus modestus | | |
| State flower | Red vanda Renanthera imschootiana | | |
| State tree | Indian rose chestnut Mesua ferrea | | |

=== Nagaland ===
| Title | Symbol | Image | Notes |
|---|---|---|---|
| State emblem | Emblem of Nagaland | | |
| State motto | Unity | | |
| State animal | Mithun; Bos frontalis | | |
| State bird | Blyth's tragopan Tragopan blythii | | |
| State fish | Chocolate mahseer Neolissochilus hexagonolepis | | |
| State flower | Tree rhododendron Rhododendron arboreum | | |
| State tree | Alder; Alnus nepalensis | | |

=== Odisha ===
| Title | Symbol | Image | Notes |
|---|---|---|---|
| State emblem | Emblem of Odisha | | |
| State motto | Satyameva Jayate सत्यमेव जयते Truth Alone Triumphs | | |
| State song | Bande Utkala Janani; I Adore Thee, O Mother Utkala! | | |
| State foundation day | Odisha Day (1 April) | | |
| State animal | Sambar Deer; Rusa unicolor | | |
| State bird | Indian roller Coracias benghalensis | | |
| State fish | Mahanadi mahseer Tor mosal mahanadicus | | |
| State flower | Ashoka tree Saraca asoca | | |
| State tree | Sacred fig Ficus religiosa | | |

=== Punjab ===
| Title | Symbol | Image | Notes |
|---|---|---|---|
| State emblem | Emblem of Punjab ਰਾਜ ਚਿੰਨ੍ਹ | | |
| State motto | Satyameva Jayate ਸਤਿਆਮੇਵ ਜਯਤੇ Truth Alone Triumphs | | |
| State official language | Punjabi ਪੰਜਾਬੀ | | Adopted as sole official language after Punjab's 1966 reorganisation on linguistic lines, which also created Haryana and the union territory of Chandigarh. |
| State flower | Gladiolus ਗਲੈਡੀਓਲਸ; Gladiolus grandiflorus | | |
| State fruit | Mandarin orange ਮੈਂਡਰਿਨ ਸੰਤਰਾ Citrus reticulata | | |
| State tree | Sheesham ਸ਼ੀਸ਼ਮ; Dalbergia sissoo | | |
| State animal | Blackbuck ਕਾਲਾ ਹਿਰਨ; Antilope cervicapra | | |
| State bird | Baaz ਬਾਜ਼ Accipiter gentilis | | |
| State fish | Indus River dolphin ਸਿੰਧ ਨਦੀ ਡਾਲਫਿਨ; Bhulan | | Declared Punjab's state aquatic animal. |
| State dance | Giddha and Bhangra ਗਿੱਧਾ ਅਤੇ ਭੰਗੜਾ | | |
| State sport | Punjabi kabaddi ਪੰਜਾਬੀ ਕਬੱਡੀ (de facto) | | |

=== Rajasthan ===
| Title | Symbol | Image | Notes |
|---|---|---|---|
| State emblem | Uses the National Emblem of India | | |
| State motto | Satyameva Jayate सत्यमेव जयते Truth Alone Triumphs | | |
| State animal | Chinkara; Gazella bennettii | | |
| State bird | Great Indian bustard Ardeotis nigriceps | | One of the world's heaviest flying birds and critically endangered. |
| State flower | Rohida; Tecomella undulata | | |
| State heritage animal | Dromedary camel Camelus dromedarius | | |
| State plant | Cactus | | |
| State tree | Khejri; Prosopis cineraria | | A hardy desert tree central to Rajasthan's arid agro-ecology and famed for the 1730 Khejarli massacre in its defence. |

=== Sikkim ===
| Title | Symbol | Image | Notes |
|---|---|---|---|
| State emblem | Emblem of Sikkim | | |
| State motto | Kham-sum-wangdu ༄༅།ཁམས་གསུམ་དབང་འདུས; Conqueror of the Three Worlds | | |
| State animal | Red panda Ailurus fulgens | | |
| State bird | Blood pheasant Ithaginis cruentus | | |
| State fish | Copper mahseer / Katley; Neolissochilus hexagonolepis | | |
| State flower | Noble dendrobium Dendrobium nobile | | |
| State tree | Rhododendron; Rhododendron niveum | | |

=== Tamil Nadu ===
| Title | Symbol | Image | Notes |
|---|---|---|---|
| Emblem | Emblem of Tamil Nadu | | The emblem is used as the seal of the Government of Tamil Nadu. It was designed in 1949 by R. Krishna Rao from Madurai. The round seal consists of the Lion Capital of Ashoka without the bell lotus foundation, flanked on either side by the Indian flag. Behind the capital is an image of a gopuram of a Hindu temple. Around the rim of the seal runs two inscriptions in Tamil script. In the top, it is mentioned "Tamil Natu aracu", which translates to "Government of Tamil Nadu", and the at the bottom, it states "Vaymaiye vellum" which translates to "Truth Alone Triumphs". As per Rao, the image of the gopuram is based on the west tower of the Madurai Meenakshi Temple. It is the only Indian state emblem that has the Indian flag and a Hindu temple tower on its seal. |
| Motto | Vaymaiye Vellum ("Truth Alone Triumphs") | | Vaymaiyae Vellum is the Tamil translation of Satyameva Jayate ("Truth Alone Triumphs"), the national motto of India. It is a quote taken from the Mundaka Upanishad, which forms part of the sacred Hindu literature of the Vedas. |
| Anthem | Tamil Thai Valthu ("Invocation to Tamil Mother") | | The original song was written by Manonmaniam Sundaram Pillai (1855–1897), as an invocation to Tamil Thai (Tamil Mother) in the prelude to the play Manonmaniam in 1891. A rendition of the song was later composed by M. S. Viswanathan, and sung by T. M. Soundarajan and P. Susheela. On 23 November 1970, the Government of Tamil Nadu announced that verses of the song would be recited as Tamil Thai Valthu at the beginning of state government functions. On 17 December 2021, the state government formally declared it as the official state song. |
| Day | Tamil Nadu Day; Tamil Nadu Dhinam | | The Indian states were linguistically organised by the States Reorganisation Act, 1956 which established the current boundaries of the state and came to effect on 1 November 1956. A resolution to rename Madras State as Tamil Nadu as passed by the Tamil Nadu Legislative Assembly on 18 July 1967, and the state was officially renamed on 14 January 1969. In 2019, the Government of Tamil Nadu announced that 1 November will be celebrated annually as "Tamil Nadu Day" marking the date of formation of the state. In July 2022, the state government announced that 18 July of every year will be celebrated as "Tamil Nadu Day" beginning that year to mark the renaming of the state. |
| Language (Note: Tamil is declared as the official language of the state. English is used as an additional official language.) | Tamil | | Tamil is the official language of the state as per the Tamil Nadu Official Language Act, 1956. It is also the widely spoken language by the state's population. It is one of the oldest languages, with a written history dating to at least the third century BCE. It was the first language to be recognised as a classical language of India on 12 October 2004. |
| Animal | Nilgiri tahr (Nilgiritragus hylocrius); Varaiyaadu | | Nilgiri tahr is an endangered ungulate that is endemic to the Nilgiri Hills and the southern portion of the Western and Eastern Ghats in Tamil Nadu and Kerala. It is the only species in the genus Nilgiritragus. It is a stocky built goat with a short and coarse grey fur with backward-curving horns. The 'Project Nilgiri Tahr', launched by the Government of Tamil Nadu in 2022, is aimed at conserving the species. As a part of the project, 7 October as the 'Nilgiri Tahr Day' in the state. |
| Bird | Emerald dove (Chalcophaps indica); Maragadhappura | | Emerald dove is a common pigeon occupying a wide variety of habitats across the Indian subcontinent including Tamil Nadu. It is a stocky, medium-sized pigeon with bright emerald green coloured wings. |
| Butterfly | Tamil yeoman (Cirrochroa thais); Tamil Maravan | | Tamil yeoman is a species of nymphalidae found in the Western Ghats in South India and Sri Lanka. It has bright reddish yellow coloured wings with black tips and a white spot. It was declared as the state butterfly on 26 June 2019. As per the state government, it was chosen for its name and presence in the state, and for the conservation of its major habitat, the Western Ghats. |
| Flower | Gloriosa lily (Gloriosa superba); Chenkaanthal | | Gloriosa lilly is a flowering plant found across the tropical regions of South Asia and Africa. The plant produces several solitary bright red and yellow coloured flowers on long stalks. It is locally known as Chenkaanthal and Karthigai Poo. While used in folk medicine, most of the parts of the plant are highly toxic. |
| Fruit | Jackfruit (Artocarpus heterophyllus); Palaapalam | | The jackfruit is a large evergreen tree that in the mulberry family of Moraceae. It might have originated in the Western Ghats and is widely cultivated in the region. It produces the largest of all tree-borne fruits, weighing up to 50 kg (110 lb). The fruit consists of several yellow coloured fleshy bulbs each of which encloses a single seed. The fruit bulbs and seeds are edible, and the sap, leaves, and wood have various applications. Both the raw and ripe fruits are extensively used in Tamil cuisine. |
| Tree | Palmyra palm (Borassus flabellifer); Panai Maram | | Palmyra palm is a fan palm found in the tropical regions of South Asia. A tall, sturdy tree, it has large fan-shaped leaves and produces bunches of large fruits containing sweet, watery kernels (called "nungu" locally). It is drought resistant and can have a productive life of 100+ years. Most of the parts of the tree including its fruit, sap, leaves, and trunk, find extensive applications. The fruits and sprouts are edible while the sap is used to make palm wine and jaggery. The tree is known by several names in Tamil literature and forms a major part of the Tamil culture. |
| Sport | Kabaddi | | Kabaddi is a contact and team sport. The objective of the game is for a single player ("raider") to run into the opposing team's half of the court, touch out as many of their players and return without being tackled by the defenders. Points are scored when players are tagged by the raider or when opposing team tackles the raider. The sport has been played for more than four thousand years. The term kabaddi is said to have originated from the Tamil words "kai" and "pidi" meaning "to hold hands". |

=== Telangana ===
| Title | Symbol | Image | Notes |
|---|---|---|---|
| State emblem | Emblem of Telangana తెలంగాణ రాష్ట్ర అధికార చిహ్నము | | |
| State motto | Satyameva Jayate సత్యమేవ జయతే Truth Alone Triumphs | | |
| State song | Jaya Jaya He Telangana జయ జయ హే తెలంగాణ; Victory to Mother Telangana! | | |
| State foundation day | Telangana Day తెలంగాణ రాష్ట్ర అవతరణ దినోత్సవం (2 June) | | Marks Telangana's formation as India's 29th state in 2014. |
| State animal | Spotted deer మచ్చల జింక; Axis axis | | |
| State bird | Indian roller పాలపిట్ట; Coracias benghalensis | | |
| State fish | Snakehead murrel కొర్రమీను Channa striata | | |
| State flower | Tangidi Puvvu తంగిడి పువ్వు Senna auriculata | | |
| State fruit | Mango మామిడి పండు | | |
| State tree | Jammi Chettu జమ్మీ చెట్టు Prosopis cineraria | | |

=== Tripura ===
| Title | Symbol | Image | Notes |
|---|---|---|---|
| State emblem | Emblem of Tripura | | A new state emblem received central government recognition in 2025. |
| State motto | Satyameva Jayate সত্যমেব জয়তে Truth Alone Triumphs | | |
| State animal | Phayre's leaf monkey Trachypithecus phayrei | | |
| State bird | Green imperial pigeon Ducula aenea | | |
| State fish | Pabda; Ompok bimaculatus | | |
| State flower | Indian rose chestnut Mesua ferrea | | |
| State fruit | Queen pineapple Ananas comosus | | Declared state fruit by the President of India in 2018. |
| State tree | Agarwood | | |

=== Uttar Pradesh ===
| Title | Symbol | Image | Notes |
|---|---|---|---|
| State emblem | Emblem of Uttar Pradesh | | |
| State foundation day | Uttar Pradesh Day (24 January) | | |
| State animal | Barasingha; Rucervus duvaucelii | | |
| State aquatic animal | Ganges river dolphin | | |
| State bird | Sarus crane Grus antigone | | The world's tallest flying bird, culturally significant in the state's Terai wetlands. |
| State fish | Chital; Chitala chitala | | |
| State flower | Palash; Butea monosperma | | |
| State tree | Ashoka; Saraca asoca | | |

=== West Bengal ===
| Title | Symbol | Image | Notes |
|---|---|---|---|
| State emblem | Emblem of West Bengal পশ্চিমবঙ্গের সরকারি প্রতীকচিহ্ন | | |
| State motto | Satyameva Jayate সত্যমেব জয়তে Truth Alone Triumphs | | |
| State song | Banglar Mati Banglar Jol বাংলার মাটি বাংলার জল; The Soil of Bengal, The Water of Bengal | | Adopted as Bengal Day is now observed on Poila Baisakh (Bengali New Year). |
| State animal | Fishing cat মেছোবিড়াল; Prionailurus viverrinus | | |
| State bird | White-throated kingfisher ধলাগলা মাছরাঙা Halcyon smyrnensis | | |
| State fish | Ilish ইলিশ; Tenualosa ilisha | | |
| State flower | Night-flowering jasmine পারিজাত/শিউলি Nyctanthes arbor-tristis | | |
| State tree | Blackboard tree ছাতিম গাছ; Alstonia scholaris | | |
| State fruit | Mango আম | | |

== Union territories ==
=== Andaman and Nicobar Islands ===
| Title | Symbol | Image | Notes |
|---|---|---|---|
| State emblem | Uses the National Emblem of India | | |
| State motto | Satyameva Jayate सत्यमेव जयते Truth Alone Triumphs | | |
| State animal | Dugong | | |
| State bird | Andaman wood pigeon Columba palumboides | | |
| State flower | Andaman Pyinma; Lagerstroemia hypoleuca | | |
| State tree | Andaman redwood Pterocarpus dalbergioides | | |

=== Chandigarh ===
| Title | Symbol | Image | Notes |
|---|---|---|---|
| State emblem | Emblem of Chandigarh | | |
| State animal | Indian grey mongoose Urva edwardsii | | |
| State bird | Indian grey hornbill Ocyceros birostris | | |
| State flower | Dhak flower Butea monosperma | | |
| State tree | Mango | | |

=== Dadra and Nagar Haveli and Daman and Diu ===
| Title | Symbol | Image | Notes |
|---|---|---|---|
| State emblem | Uses the National Emblem of India | | |
| State motto | Satyameva Jayate सत्यमेव जयते Truth Alone Triumphs | | |

=== Delhi ===
| Title | Symbol | Image | Notes |
|---|---|---|---|
| State emblem | Uses the National Emblem of India | | |
| State motto | Satyameva Jayate सत्यमेव जयते Truth Alone Triumphs | | |
| State animal | Nilgai; Boselaphus tragocamelus | | |
| State bird | House sparrow Passer domesticus | | |
| State flower | Alfalfa; Medicago sativa | | |
| State tree | Flamboyant; Delonix regia | | |

=== Jammu and Kashmir ===
| Title | Symbol | Image | Notes |
|---|---|---|---|
| State emblem | Emblem of Jammu and Kashmir | | |
| State motto | Satyameva Jayate सत्यमेव जयते Truth Alone Triumphs | | |
| State animal | Kashmir stag Cervus hanglu hanglu | | |
| State bird | Kalij pheasant Lophura leucomelanos | | Declared in October 2021. |
| State fish | Golden mahseer Tor putitora | | |
| State flower | Common rhododendron Rhododendron ponticum | | |
| State tree | Chinar; Platanus orientalis | | |
| State butterfly | Blue pansy Junonia orithya | | Declared in June 2023. |

=== Ladakh ===
| Title | Symbol | Image | Notes |
|---|---|---|---|
| State emblem | Emblem of Ladakh | | |
| State motto | Satyameva Jayate सत्यमेव जयते Truth Alone Triumphs | | |
| State animal | Snow leopard Panthera uncia | | Declared alongside the black-necked crane in 2021. |
| State bird | Black-necked crane Grus nigricollis | | Declared alongside the snow leopard in 2021. |
| State flower | Himalayan blue poppy Meconopsis betonicifolia | | Declared state flower by order of the Ladakh administration in 2023. |
| State tree | Juniper; Juniperus semiglobosa | | Declared state tree by order of the Ladakh administration in 2023. |

=== Lakshadweep ===
| Title | Symbol | Image | Notes |
|---|---|---|---|
| State emblem | Emblem of Lakshadweep | | |
| State animal | Butterflyfish; Chaetodon falcula | | |
| State bird | Brown noddy Anous stolidus | | |
| State flower | Neelakurinji നീലക്കുറിഞ്ഞി | | |
| State tree | Breadfruit കടപ്ലാവ് Artocarpus incisa | | |

=== Puducherry ===
| Title | Symbol | Image | Notes |
|---|---|---|---|
| State emblem | Emblem of Puducherry | | |
| State motto | வாய்மையே வெல்லும் Truth Alone Triumphs | | |
| State song | Tamil Thai Valthu; Invocation to Tamil Mother | | |
| State animal | Indian palm squirrel Funambulus palmarum | | |
| State bird | Koel; Eudynamys scolopaceus | | |
| State flower | Cannonball; Couroupita guianensis | | |
| State tree | Bael; Aegle marmelos | | |

== Autonomous administrative divisions ==
Some of the autonomous administrative divisions established under the Sixth Schedule of the Constitution of India have also adopted official symbols.

=== Bodoland Territorial Region ===
| Title | Symbol | Image | Notes |
|---|---|---|---|
| Emblem | Uses a seal based on the National Emblem of India | | |
| Motto | Satyameva Jayate सत्यमेव जयते Truth Alone Triumphs | | |

== See also ==
- National symbols of India
- List of Indian state flags
- List of Indian state emblems
- List of Indian state mottos
- List of Indian state songs
- List of Indian state foundation days
- List of Indian state animals
- List of Indian state birds
- List of Indian state flowers
- List of Indian state trees

== Sources ==
- Sunil Kothari; Avinash Pasricha (2001). Kuchipudi. Abhinav Publications. ISBN 978-81-7017-359-5.
- Williams, Drid (2004). "In the Shadow of Hollywood Orientalism: Authentic East Indian Dancing". Visual Anthropology. 17 (1). Routledge: 69–98. doi:10.1080/08949460490274013.
