= List of Indian state flags =

Flags of Indian States

As of 2026, there are no officially recognised flags for the individual states or union territories of India. There are no legal prohibitions to prevent states adopting distinctive flags in either the Emblems and Names (Prevention of Improper Use) Act, 1950, or the Prevention of Insults to National Honour Act, 1971. In a 1994 case before the Supreme Court of India, S. R. Bommai v. Union of India, the Supreme Court declared that there is no prohibition in the Constitution of India for a state to have its own flag. However, a state flag should not dishonour the national flag. The Flag Code of India also permits other flags to be flown with the Flag of India, but not on the same flag pole or in a superior position to the national flag.

== Former official state flags ==
The state of Jammu and Kashmir had an officially recognised state flag between 1952 and 2019 under the special status granted to the state by Article 370 of the Constitution of India.

Flag	State	Usage date	Description
	Jammu and Kashmir	1947–1952	The flag was red with a plough in the centre. The red background stood for labour and the plough stood for agriculture. The ratio of the flag was 3:2.
	Jammu and Kashmir	1952–2019	The flag was red with three white vertical stripes in the hoist and a plough in the fly. The red background stood for labour, the stripes stood for the three administrative divisions of the state (Jammu, Kashmir and Ladakh) and the plough stood for agriculture. The ratio of the flag was 3:2.

== Proposed state flags ==
The Government of Tamil Nadu proposed a design for the Flag of Tamil Nadu in 1970.

The Government of Karnataka proposed a design for the Flag of Karnataka in 2018 based on the traditional yellow-red Kannada bicolour. The new tricolour flag with the central white band and emblem, was designed to distance itself from regional political parties and emulate the structure of the Indian tricolour. In August 2019, the Government of Karnataka announced it was no longer officially pursuing the proposal for an official state flag. The unofficial Kannada flag also remains popular within the state.

Flag	State	Proposal date	Description
	Karnataka	2018	Yellow, white and red tricolour with the Emblem of Karnataka centred on the white band.
	Tamil Nadu	1970	Grey flag with the flag of India in the canton and the Emblem of Tamil Nadu in the fly.

== Banners of the states and union territories ==
When a distinctive banner is required to represent a state or union territory, the emblem of the state or union territory is usually displayed on a white or blue field.

=== States ===
Banner of Andhra Pradesh

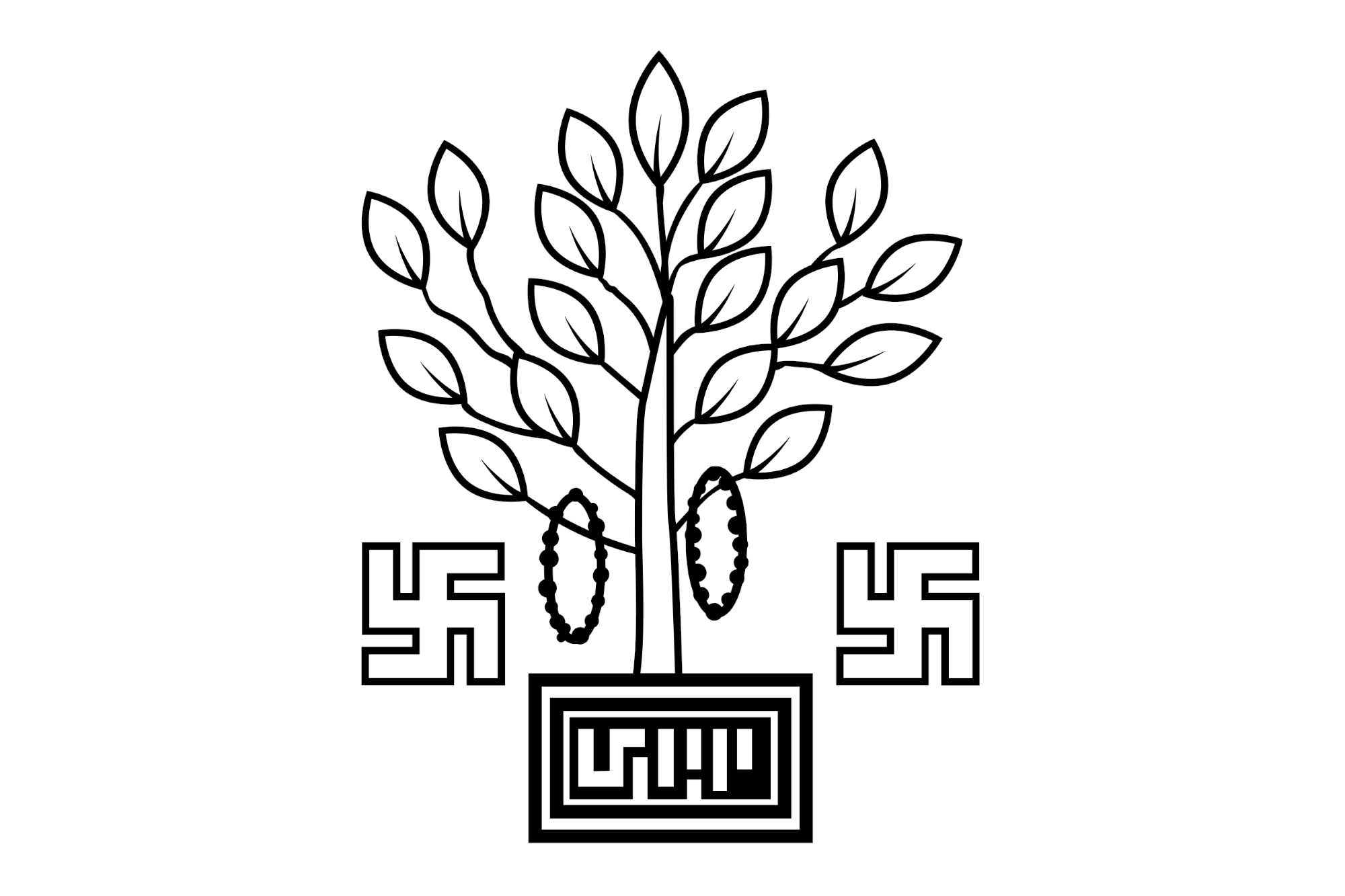
Banner of Bihar

Banner of Chhattisgarh

Banner of Goa

Banner of Haryana

Banner of Himachal Pradesh

Banner of Jharkhand

Banner of Karnataka

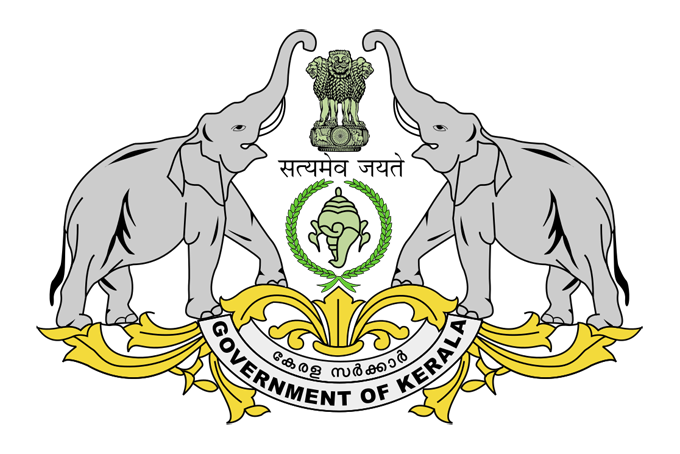
Banner of Kerala

Banner of Madhya Pradesh

Banner of Maharashtra

Banner of Manipur

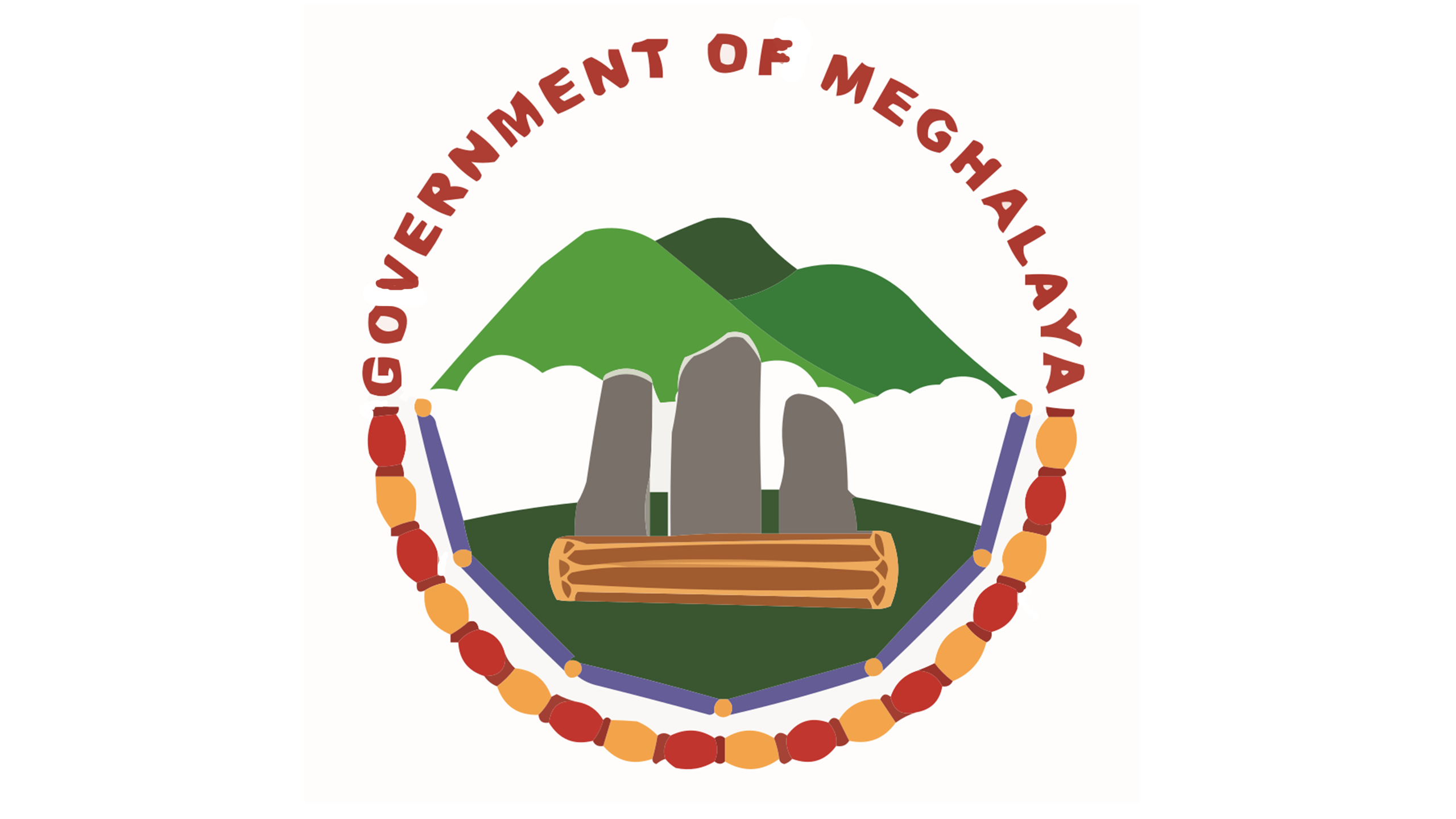
Banner of Meghalaya

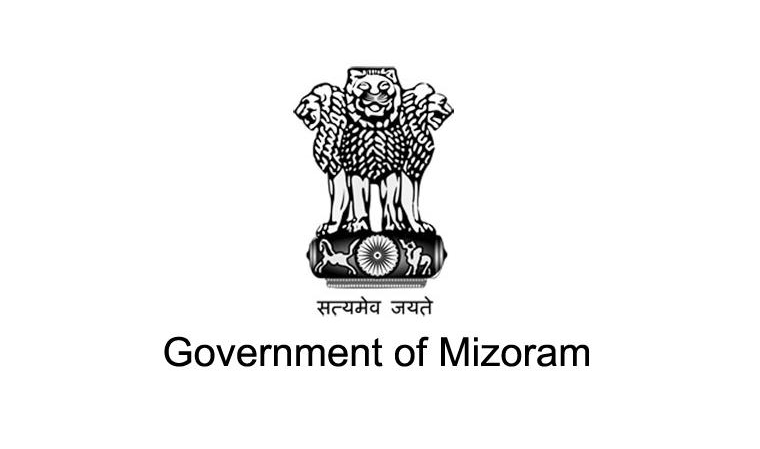
Banner of Mizoram

Banner of Odisha

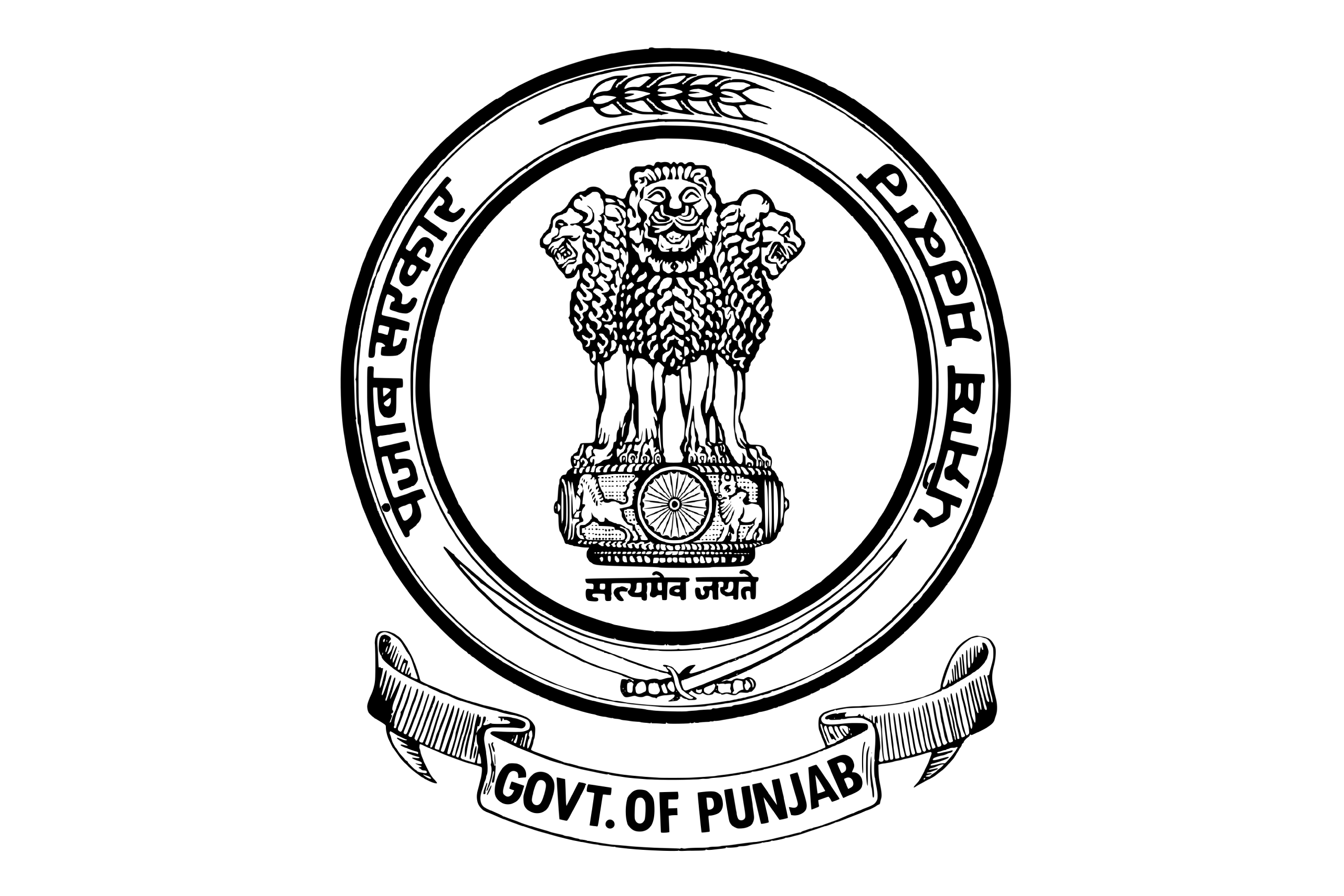
Banner of Punjab

Banner of Sikkim

Banner of Tamil Nadu

Banner of Tripura

Banner of Uttarakhand

Banner of Uttar Pradesh

=== Union territories ===
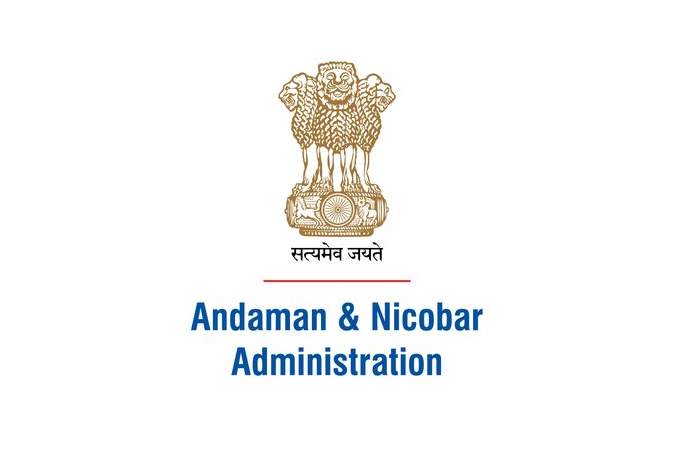
Banner of Andaman and Nicobar Islands

Banner of Chandigarh

Banner of Delhi

Banner of Ladakh

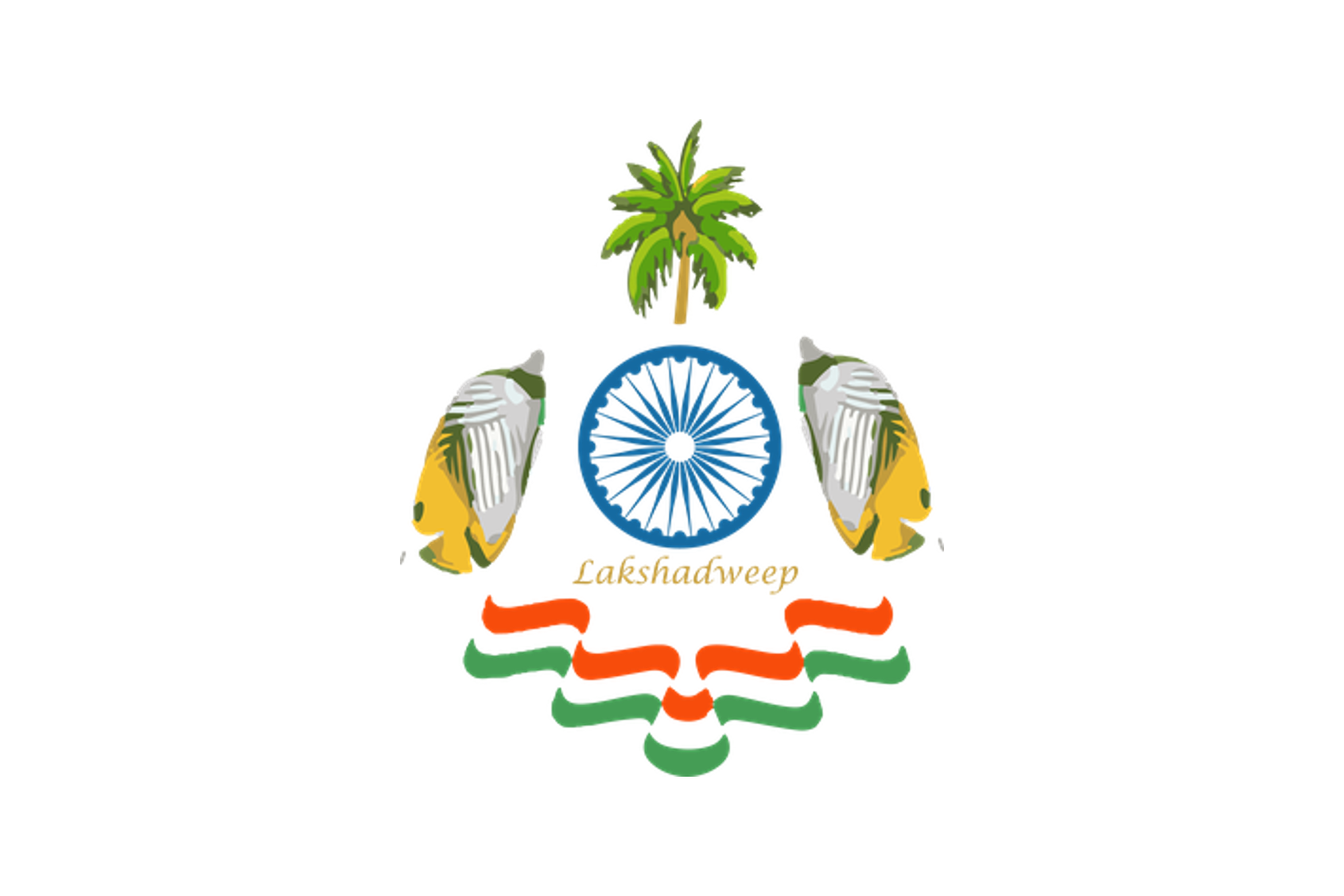
Banner of Lakshadweep

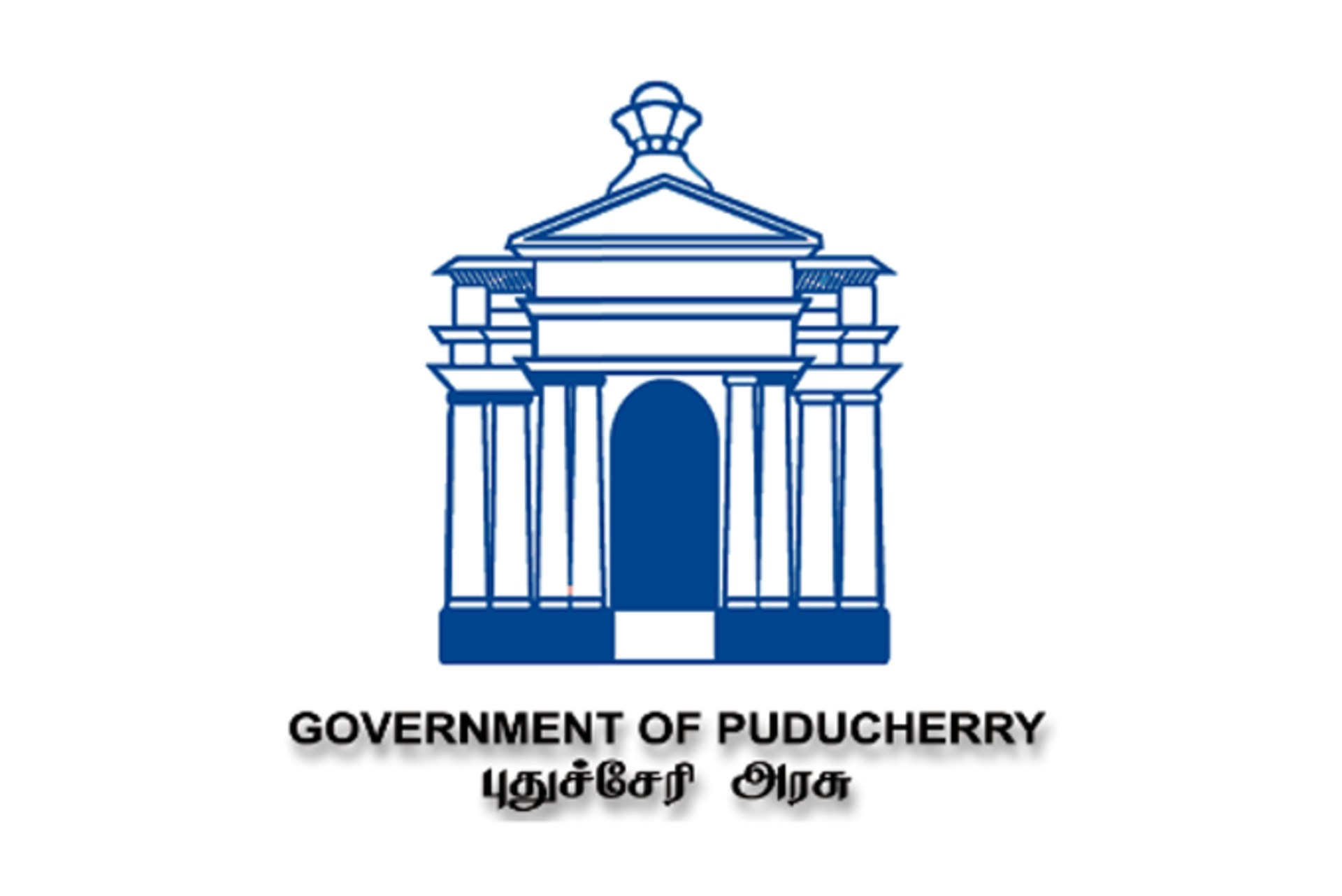
Banner of Puducherry

== See also ==
- National Flag of India
- Flag code of India
- List of Indian flags
- Flags of Indian princely states
- List of Indian state symbols
- List of Indian state emblems
- List of Indian state mottos
- List of Indian state songs
- List of Indian state foundation days
- List of Indian state animals
- List of Indian state birds
- List of Indian state flowers
- List of Indian state trees
