= State symbols =

State symbols may refer to:

- National symbols
- Australian state symbols
- Emblems of Indian states
- Indian state symbols
- United States state symbols
- in chemistry, the symbols for different states of matter
