= Lists of Indian state symbols =

The following are lists of Indian state symbols as recognised by the state legislatures or by tradition.

- List of Indian state symbols
- List of Indian state flags
- List of Indian state emblems
- List of Indian state songs
- List of Indian state mottos
- List of Indian state days
- List of Indian state animals
- List of Indian state birds
- List of Indian state flowers
- List of Indian state trees

== See also ==
- National symbols of India
