= Emblem of Andaman and Nicobar Islands =

Indian state government emblem

Seal of Andaman and Nicobar Islands
- Armiger: The Government of Andaman and Nicobar Islands
- Shield: Lion Capital of Ashoka
- Motto: "सत्यमेव जयते" (Satyameva Jayate, Sanskrit for "Truth Alone Triumphs")

The Seal of Andaman and Nicobar Islands is the official emblem used by the Union Territory of Andaman and Nicobar Islands, India. The emblem incorporates elements representing the rich natural and cultural heritage of the islands.

== Description ==
The emblem includes symbols reflecting the maritime environment and diverse wildlife of the region, symbolizing the identity and authority of the Union Territory government.

== Usage ==
The seal is used by the local government on official documents, letterheads, and government buildings to signify the official authority of the administration.

== See also ==
- Andaman and Nicobar Islands
- List of Indian state emblems
- National Emblem of India
