= Emblem of Andhra Pradesh =

Indian state seal

- Armiger: The Government of Andhra Pradesh
- Adopted: 14 November 2018
- Crest: The State Emblem of India
- Torse: Dhamma Chakka
- Shield: Purna Ghataka and Dhamma Chakka
- Motto: సత్యమేవ జయతే (translates to Satyameva Jayate; Truth Alone Triumphs from Mundaka Upanishad)
- Earlier version

The Emblem of Andhra Pradesh serves as the official state emblem of the Indian state of Andhra Pradesh.

== History ==
In 1953, following the formation of Andhra State from Madras State on a linguistic basis, the Government of Andhra adopted an official emblem featuring Poorna Kumbham, a ceremonial metal vessel characterized by its broad base and narrow neck, which serves as a sacred ornament adorning the Amaravati Stupa along with the Dharma Chakra. It depicts a radiant sun charged with a treasure vase, placed within an ornamented circular frame. At the base, the State Emblem of India and the national motto, Satyameva Jayate in Devanagari are shown. The name of the state, Government of Andhra, appeared in Telugu and Hindi. Soorisetty Anjaneyulu, a drawing master from Krishna district, created the emblem, which was selected from over 300 submitted designs.

Following the formation of Andhra Pradesh in 1956, colloquially referred to as United Andhra Pradesh, the Government of Andhra Pradesh continued and formally adopted the same emblem during the occasion of the 2,500th Buddha's Birthday celebrations, with the only major change being the replacement of "Andhra" with "Andhra Pradesh" in Telugu and Hindi.

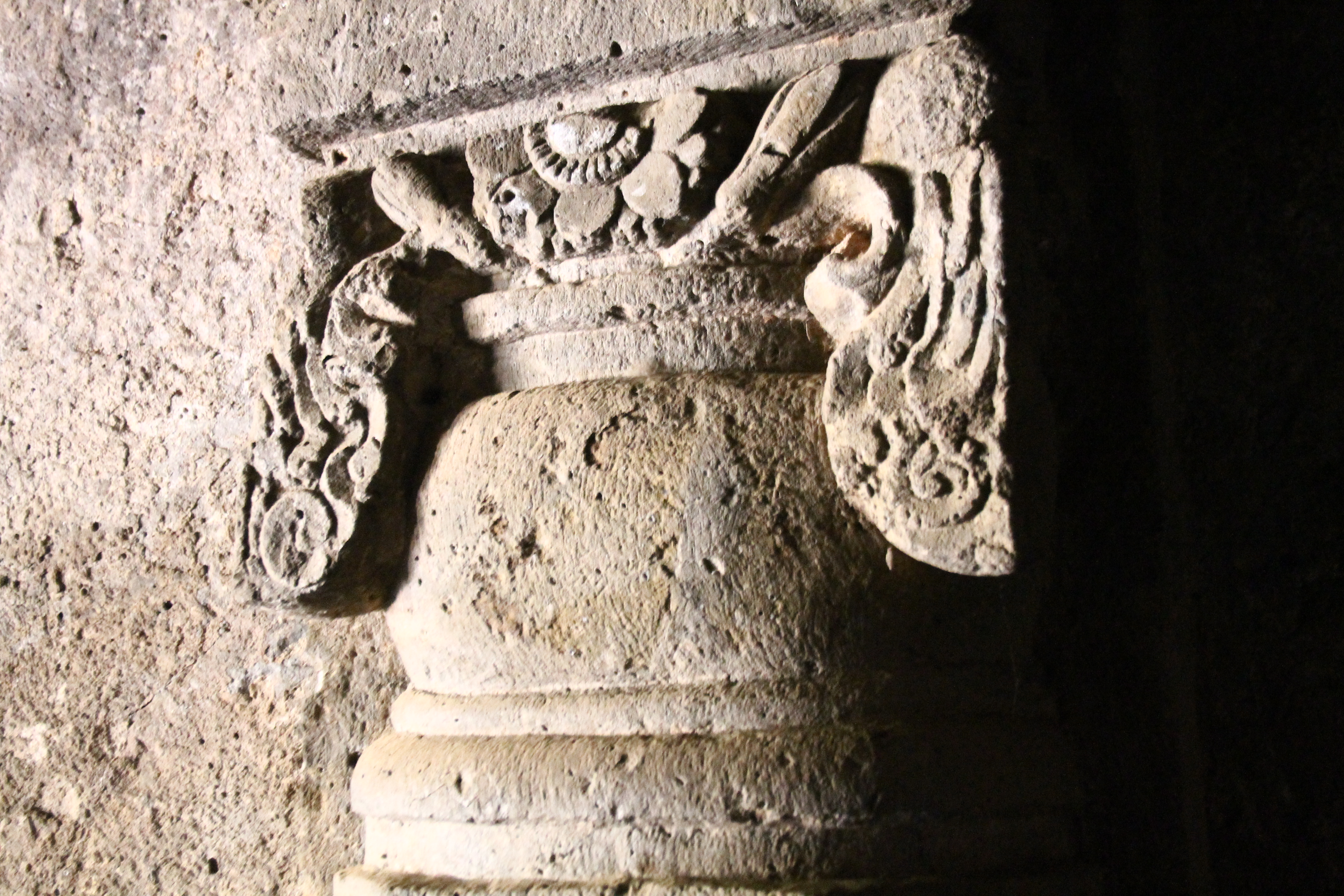
Poorna Kalasam

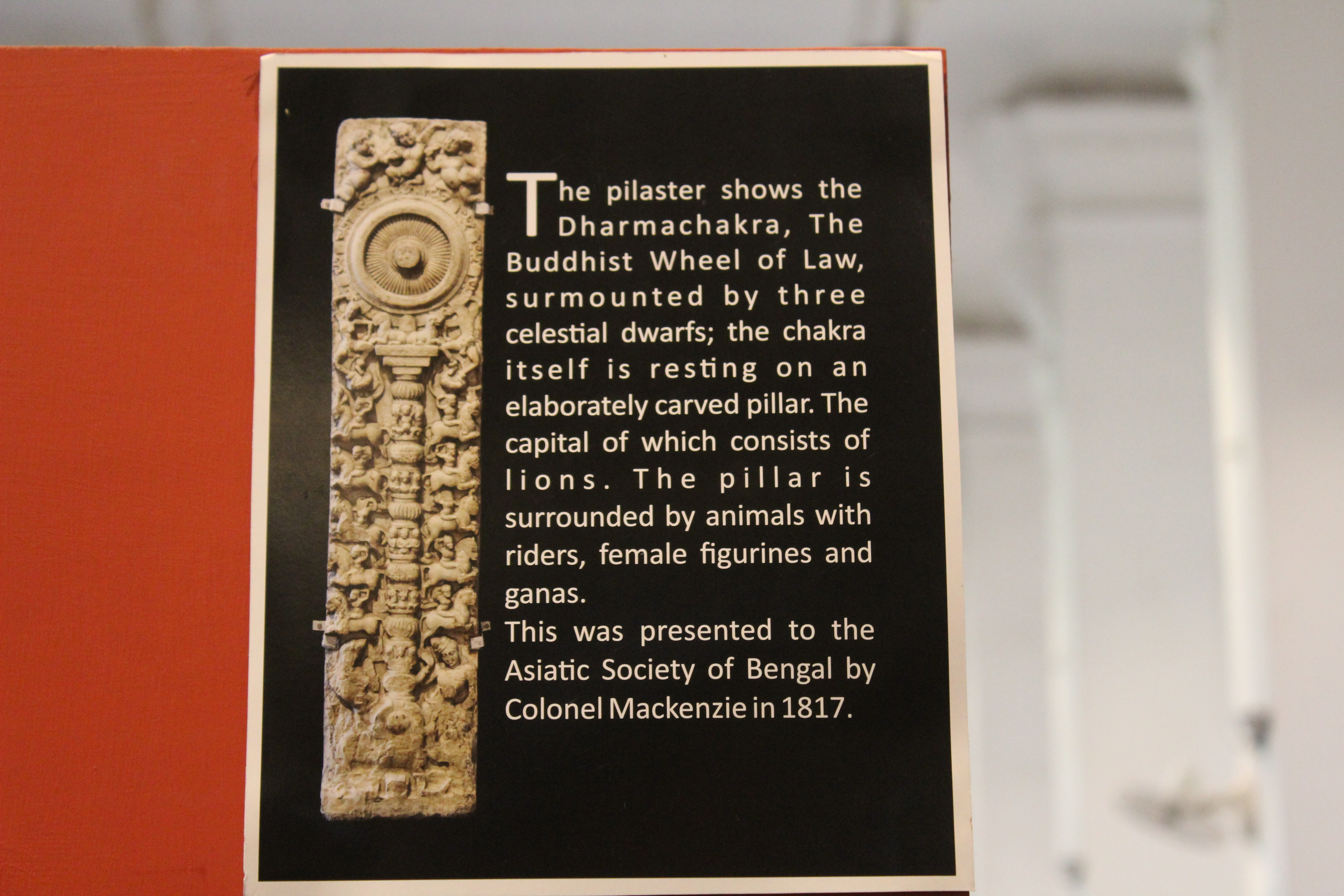
Dharma Chakra

Proposed flag of Andhra Province (1939)

== Current design ==
The Government of Andhra Pradesh finalized its new emblem for official use on 14 November 2018, four years after the state bifurcation in 2014. The N. Chandrababu Naidu led government issued a notification announcing the adoption of a new state emblem inspired by the Amravati School of Art. The emblem features Dhamma Chakka, the wheel of law which is embellished with a ring of Triratna, a symbol representing the three jewels of Buddhism. The wheel is decorated with pinnate leaves and precious stones. The hub of the Dhamma Chakka is adorned with three circles of decorative beads, arranged in ascending order of numbers: 48 in the inner circle, 118 in the middle circle and 148 in the outer circle. At the center lies the Purna Ghataka, also known as the vase of plenty which is embellished with a four banded garland on its main body, along with medallions and tassels. There is a braid around the thin neck and a flaring mouth, surrounding with text in Telugu, English and Hindi. The official release also stated that the emblem should never be reduced to a size of less than 24 mm in height.

=== Usage ===
The multi coloured version of the emblem is authorized for use by the Chief Minister, the Council of Ministers, the Chief Secretary, Secretaries, the Advocate General, all Heads of Departments (HoDs), District Collectors and District Magistrates. Conversely, the blue coloured version of the emblem is reserved for use by all District HoDs and Secretariat mid level officers or their equivalents in the state.

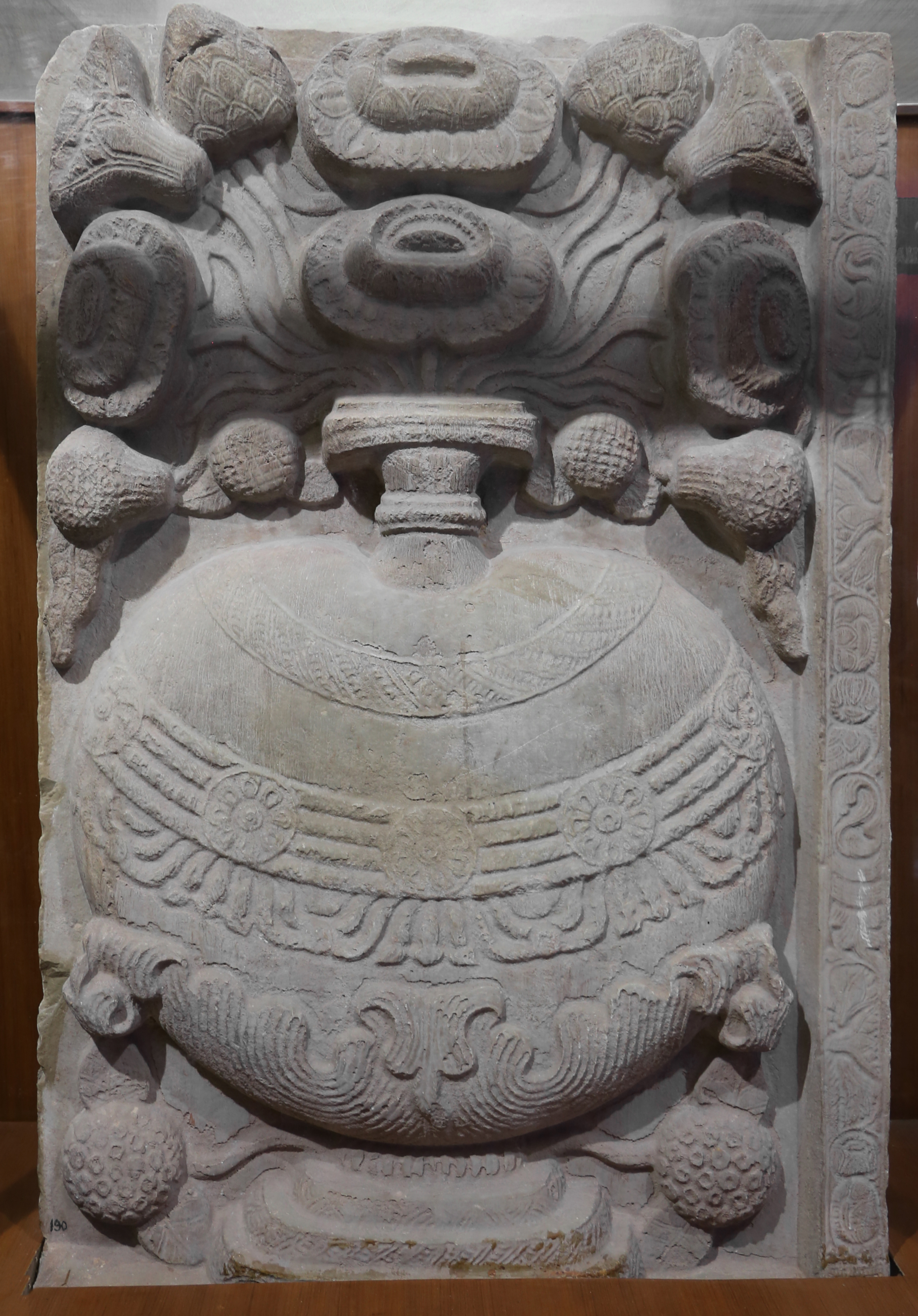
Purna Ghataka from Amaravati, Andhra Pradesh.

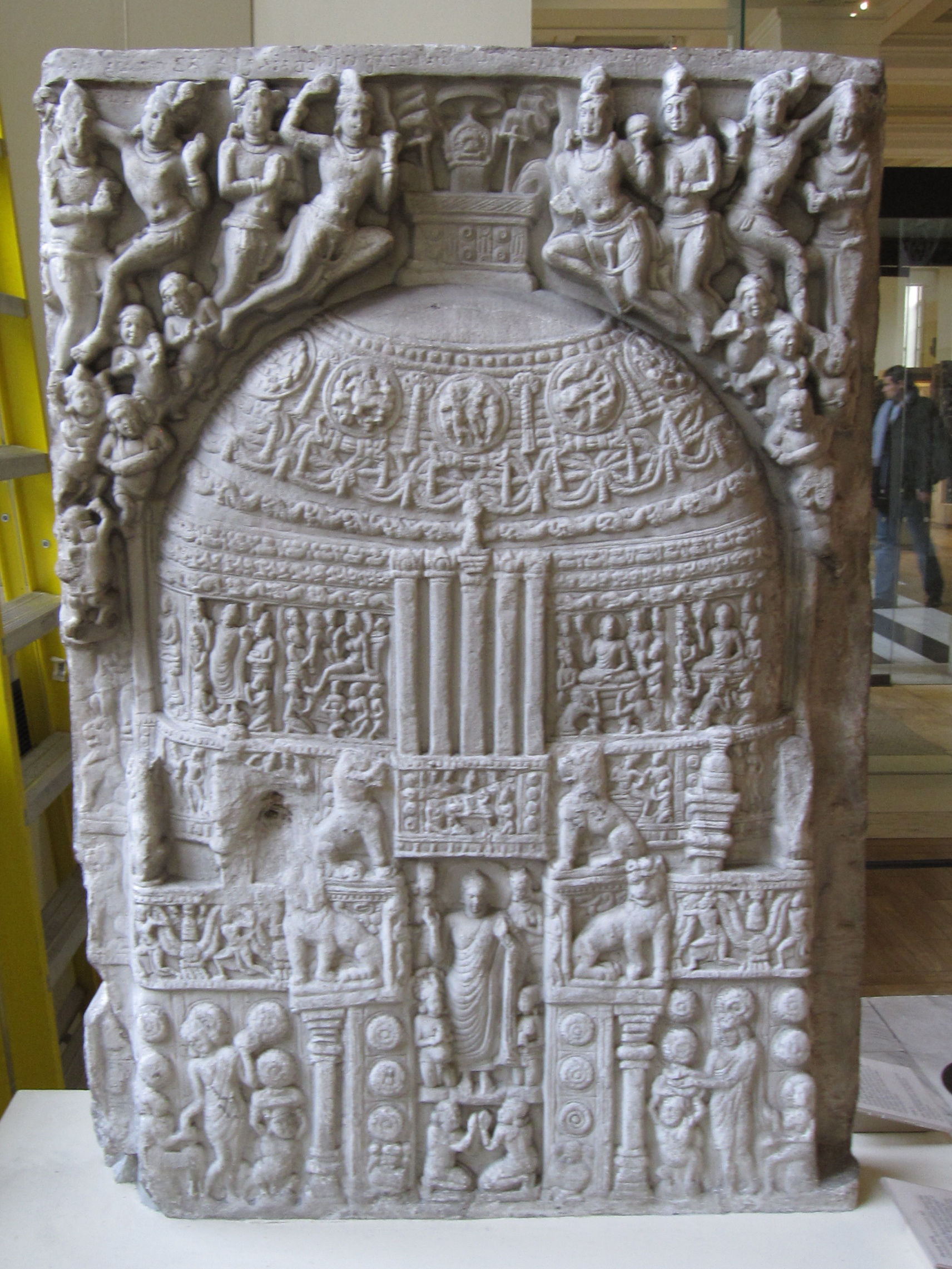
Relief detail on Amaravati Stupa with the symbol of Purna Ghataka.

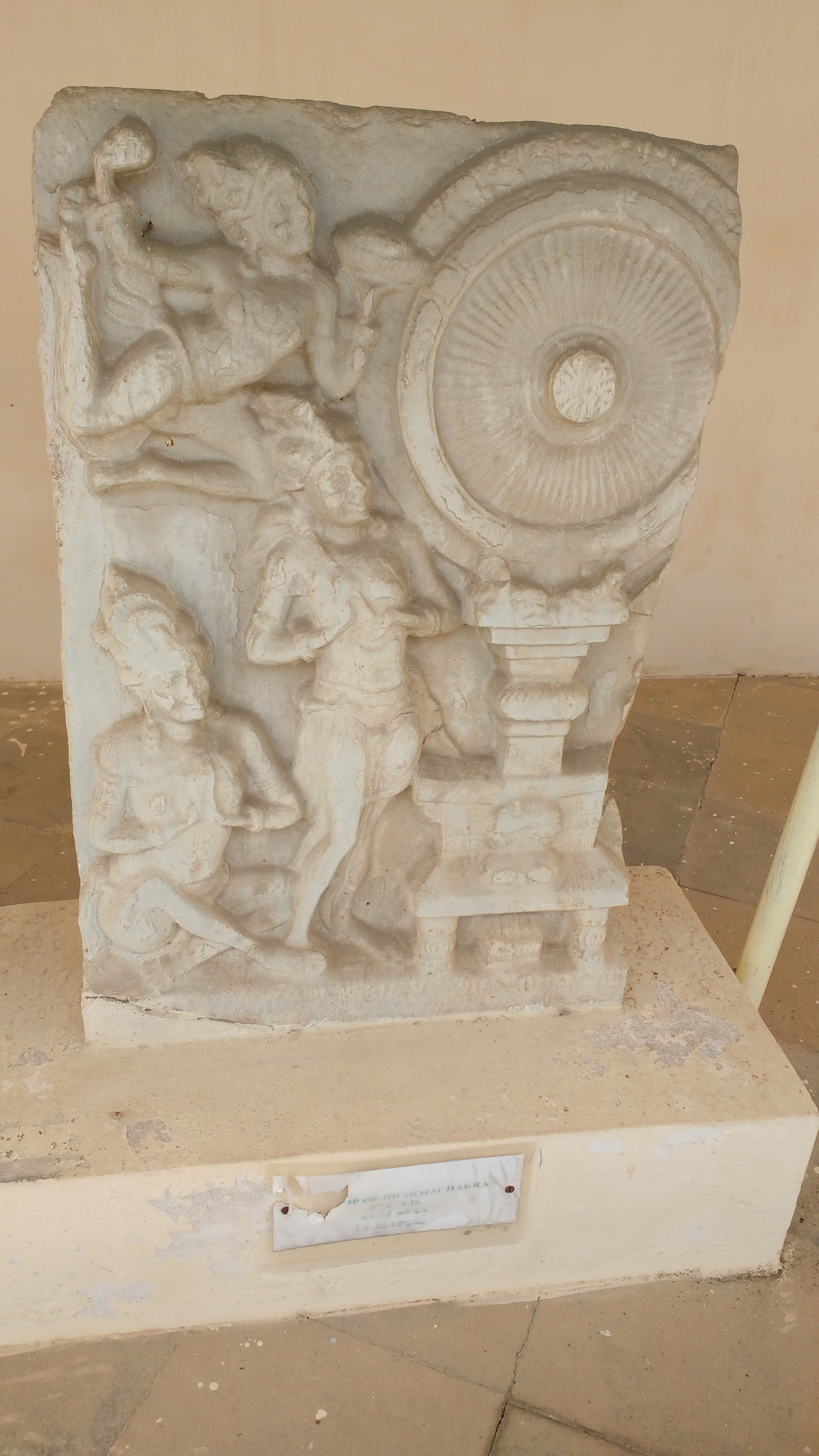
Sculpture depicting the Dhamma Chakka in the Museum of Amaravathi.

== Government banner ==
The Government of Andhra Pradesh can be represented by a banner displaying the emblem of the state on a white field.

Banner from 1956 to 2018

Banner since 2018

== See also ==
- National Emblem of India
- List of Indian state emblems
