= Emblem of Himachal Pradesh =

Himachal state seal

- Armiger: The Government of Himachal Pradesh
- Adopted: 25 January 1971
- Shield: The Sarnath Lion Capital superimposed on a semi-circular blue background with Snow-capped mountain peaks and three white stripes at the bottom
- Motto: "सत्यमेव जयते" (Satyameva Jayate, Sanskrit for "Truth Alone Triumphs")
- Other elements: "हिमाचल प्रदेश सरकार" (Hindi for "Government of Himachal Pradesh") inscribed in blue fonts at the bottom
- Use: Official representation of the State of Himachal Pradesh

The Emblem of Himachal Pradesh is the official state seal used by the Government of Himachal Pradesh and is carried on all official correspondences made by State of Himachal Pradesh. It was adopted by the Government of Himachal Pradesh at the establishment of the state on 25 January 1971. The State of Himachal Pradesh has an Emblem consisting of a mountain ridge over three white fesses, charged with the Aśoka capital.

== Design ==
The design depicts the Lion Capital of Ashoka superimposed on a semi-circular blue background with snow-capped mountain peaks and three white stripes at the bottom.

== Former princely states in Himachal Pradesh ==
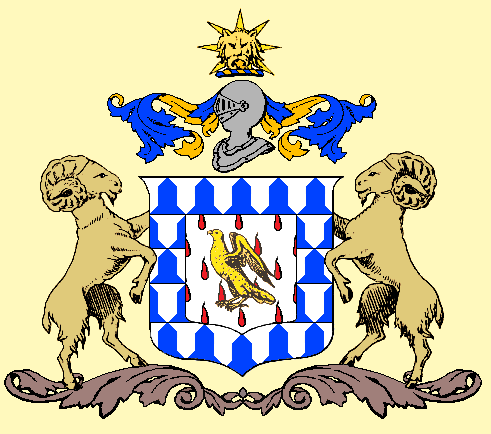
Chamba State

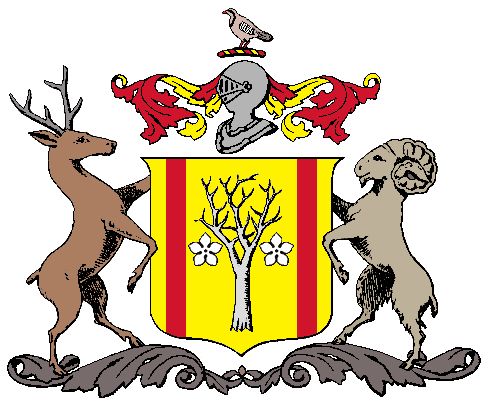
Bilaspur State

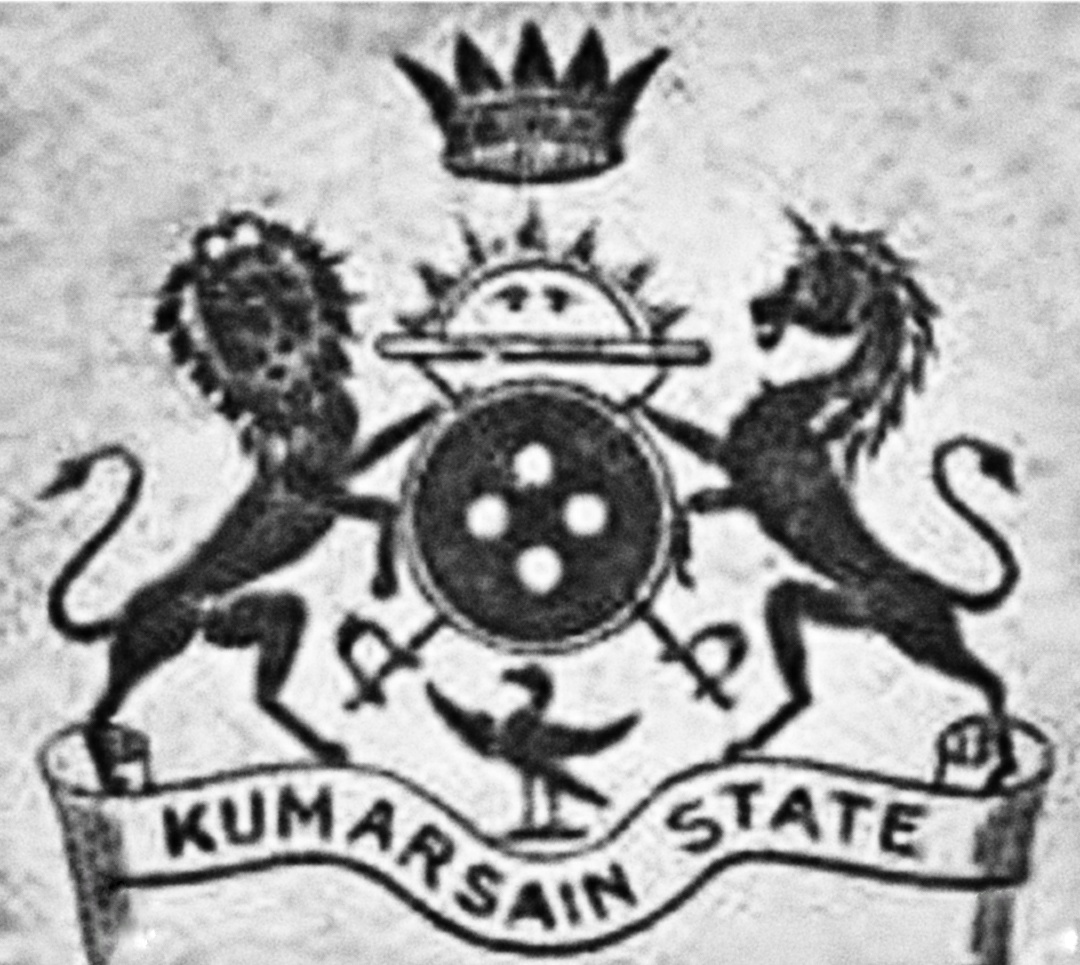
Kumarsain State

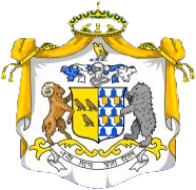
Mandi State

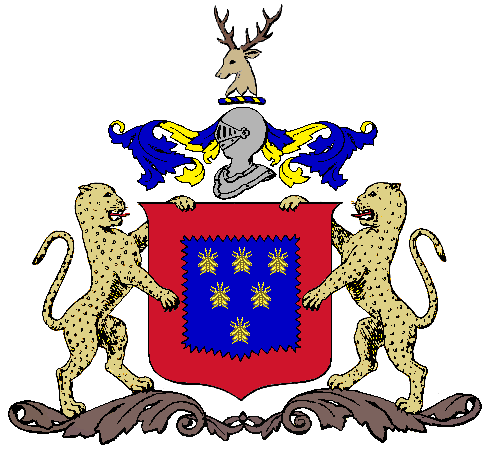
Sirmur State

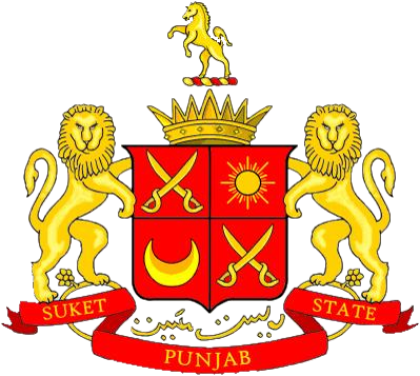
Suket State

== Government banner ==
The government of Himachal Pradesh can be represented by a banner depicting the emblem of the state on a white background.

Banner of Himachal Pradesh

== See also ==
- National Emblem of India
- List of Indian state emblems
