= Emblem of Lakshadweep =

- Armiger: The Administration of Lakshadweep
- Crest: Palm tree
- Shield: Ashoka Chakra
- Supporters: Butterflyfish
- Compartment: Colours of the Flag of India
- Motto: "सत्यमेव जयते" (Satyameva Jayate, Sanskrit for "Truth Alone Triumphs")

The Emblem of Lakshadweep is the symbol used to represent the administration of the union territory of Lakshadweep, India.

== Design ==
The emblem depicts an Ashoka Chakra behind which there is a palm tree which is flanked by two butterflyfish and below is a compartment of ribbons in the colours of the Indian flag.

== Government banner ==
The administration of Lakshadweep can be represented by a banner displaying the emblem of the territory on a white field.

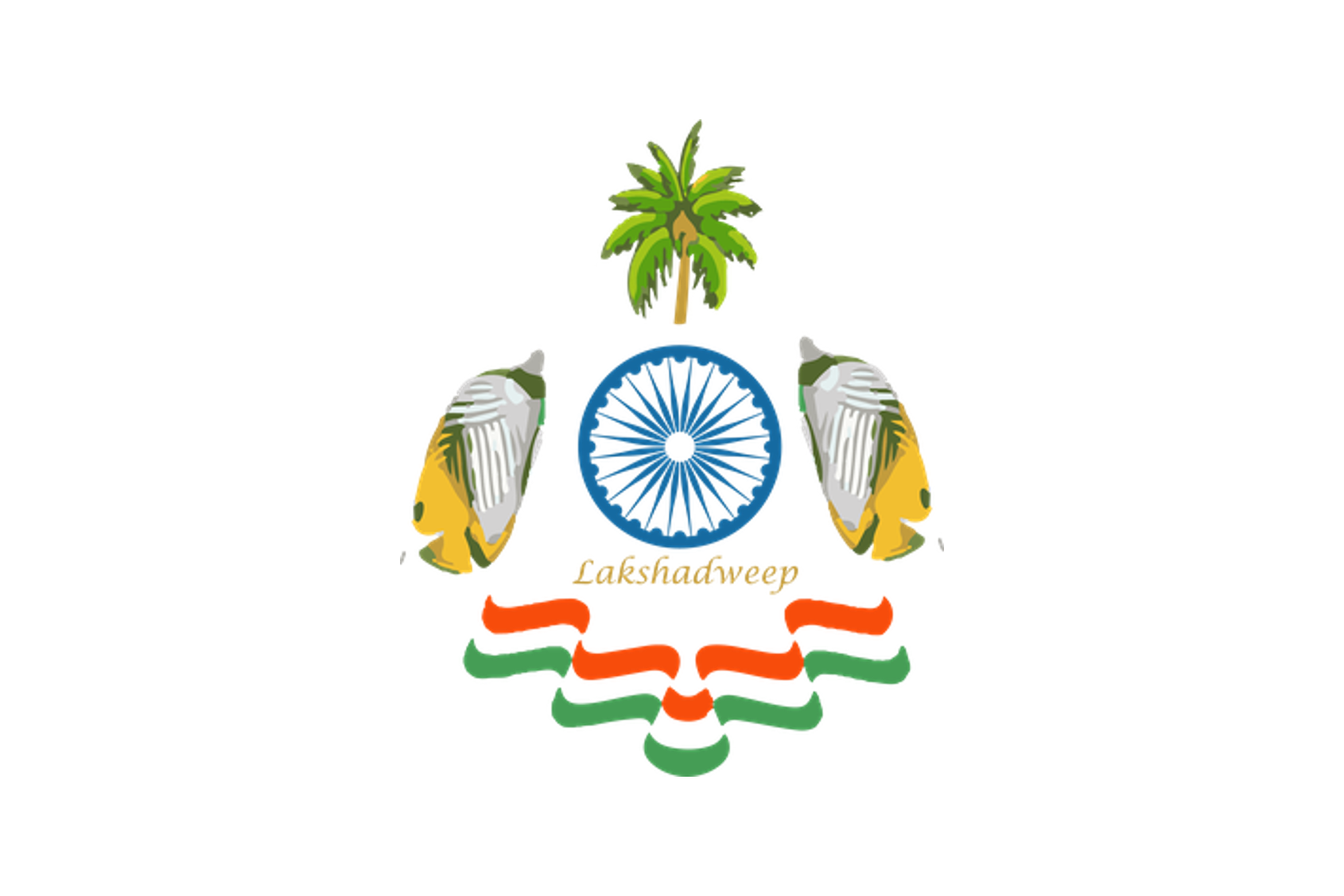
Banner of Lakshadweep

== See also ==
- National Emblem of India
- List of Indian state emblems
