= Emblem of Arunachal Pradesh =

Official seal of state of Arunachal Pradesh

- Armiger: The Government of Arunachal Pradesh
- Crest: Emblem of India
- Shield: Sunrise, Mountain peaks of the Himalayas and a Mithun bison head
- Supporters: Hornbills
- Other elements: "Arunachal Pradesh" inscribed on a scroll at the bottom

The Emblem of Arunachal Pradesh is the official seal of the government of the Indian state of Arunachal Pradesh.

== Design ==
The emblem depicts the Sun rising between the peaks of Komdi and Daphabum above a Mithun bison head and is supported by two Hornbills with the crest being formed by the Emblem of India. The mithun bison and hornbill are the official state animals and birds of Arunachal Pradesh and mountains and sunrise allude to the name of the state which translates into "the land of dawn-lit mountains".

== Government Banner ==
The Government of Arunachal Pradesh can be represented by a white banner depicting the emblem of the state.

== See also ==
- National Emblem of India
- List of Indian state emblems
