= Emblem of Jharkhand =

Jharkhand Seal

- Armiger: The Government of Jharkhand
- Adopted: 15 August 2020
- Shield: Lion Capital of Ashoka
- Motto: "सत्यमेव जयते" (Satyameva Jayate, Sanskrit for "Truth Alone Triumphs")
- Other elements: "झारखण्ड राज्य" (Hindi for "State of Jharkhand") inscribed in blue fonts at the bottom
- Earlier version
- Use: On state government documents, buildings and stationery

The Emblem of Jharkhand is the official seal of the Government of the Indian state of Jharkhand, officially adopted on 15 August 2020.

== Design ==

The emblem consists of state emblem of India, the Lion Capital of Ashoka at the centrewith the motto Satyameva Jayate, encircled by multiple rings. The outermost ring has 24 white elephants (the state animal) on the green background in the outer most ring, represents strength, wildlife, royalty and rich vegetation. The second ring showcases a sequence of 24 Palash flowers (the state flower), which are also known as 'flames of the jungle', representing rich flora, beauty and culture. The third ring consists of people, in the unique Jharkhandi-style painting, which represents the rich history and strength of social bounding. The final and innermost ring with green background has 24 circlular dots.

== History ==
Previous emblem used between 2000 and 2020

The first emblem of Jharkhand was adopted on 15 November 2000 when Jharkhand state was formed from the southern part of Bihar. This emblem consisted of an Ashoka Chakra, as depicted on the national Flag of India, surrounded by four letters Js stylised as daggers. The legend underneath, Jharkhand Sarkar, translates as Government of Jharkhand.

In January 2020, the new Chief Minister of Jharkhand, Hemant Soren announced that a new state emblem is to be adopted soon. He stated that the new emblem should represent the culture, tradition, history, and future of the state and invited entries for a new design via a public competition. A purported winning design, depicting a tree, was subsequently reported by several media outlets but this was later revealed to be a hoax.

On 22 July a new emblem was officially approved to be used from 15 August 2020.

== Government banner ==
The Government of Jharkhand can be represented by a banner displaying the emblem of the state on a white field.

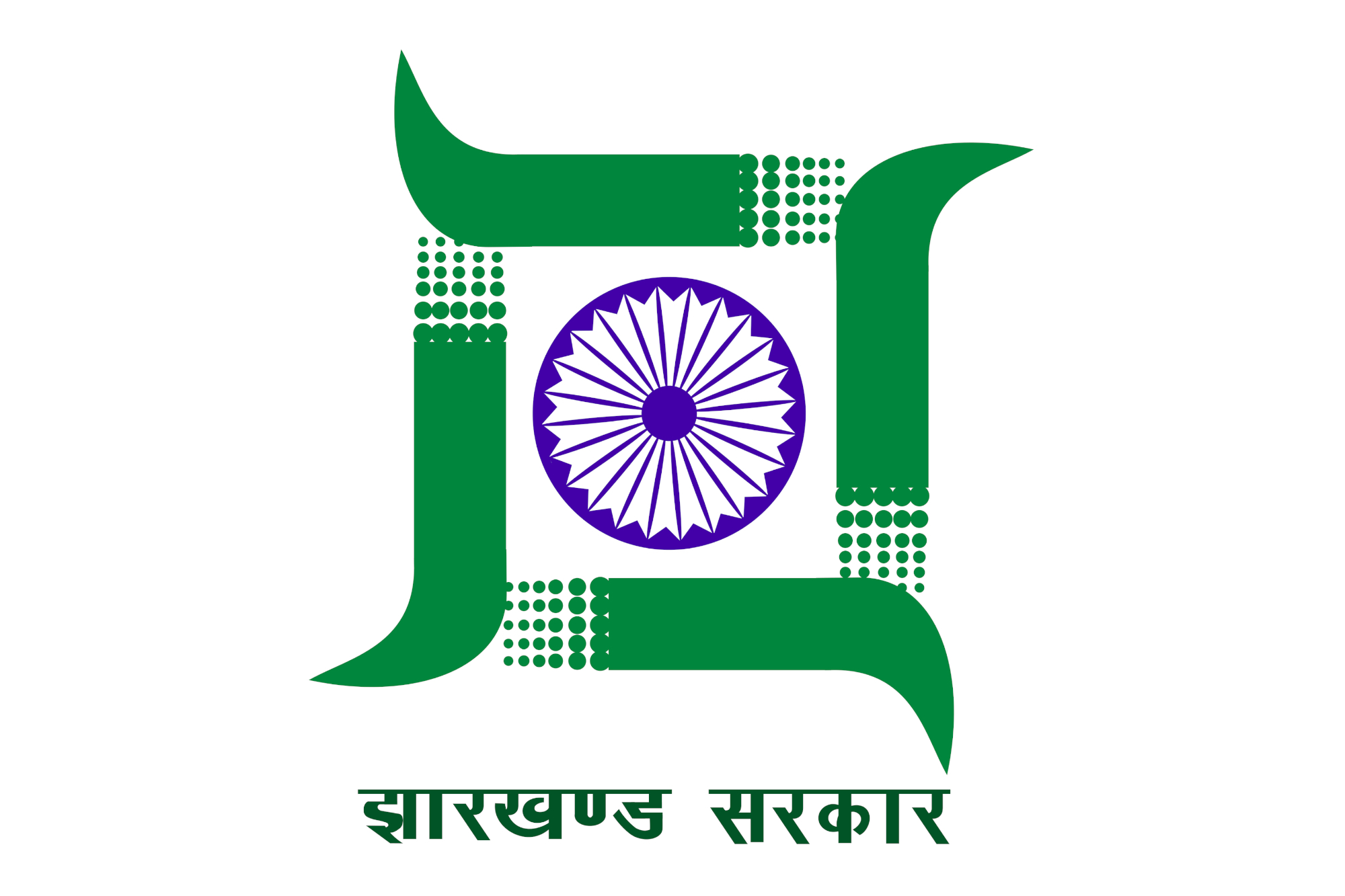
Banner of Jharkhand (2000-2020)

Banner of Jharkhand (2020–present)

== See also ==
- National Emblem of India
- List of Indian state emblems
