= Emblem of Odisha =

Indian state emblem

- Armiger: The Government of Odisha
- Adopted: 1964
- Crest: Lion Capital of Ashoka
- Shield: Warrior and Horse statue from Konark Sun Temple
- Motto: Satyameva Jayate ("Truth Alone Triumphs", from Mundaka Upanishad)
- Other elements: Odisha Shasana ("Government of Odisha") in Odia (ଓଡ଼ିଶା ଶାସନ) and Devanagari (ओड़िशा शासन)

The Emblem of Odisha is the official seal of the Government of the Indian state of Odisha. It serves as the principal symbol of the state government and is used on official documents, publications, and government communications. The emblem incorporates elements of Odisha's cultural and architectural heritage, particularly the renowned sculptures of the Konark Sun Temple.

== History ==
Following India's independence, the Government of Odisha initially used the National Emblem of India for official purposes. On 3 August 1964, the Council of Ministers of Odisha adopted a distinct state emblem based on the horse-and-rider sculpture of the Konark Sun Temple.

On 3 August 1964, the Council of Ministers adopted the design of the Konark Horse statue as the State Emblem, replacing the earlier use of the Ashoka Pillar as the state emblem. The emblem symbolises discipline, strength and progress.

== Design and symbolism ==
The State Emblem of Odisha features a circular seal that prominently displays a horseback warrior, inspired by the Warrior and Horse statue at the Konark Sun Temple.

The emblem consists of a circular seal featuring a stylized representation of the warrior-on-horse sculpture from the 13th-century Konark Sun Temple, a UNESCO World Heritage Site. The warrior and horse motif represents valor, determination, and the martial heritage of historic Kalinga.

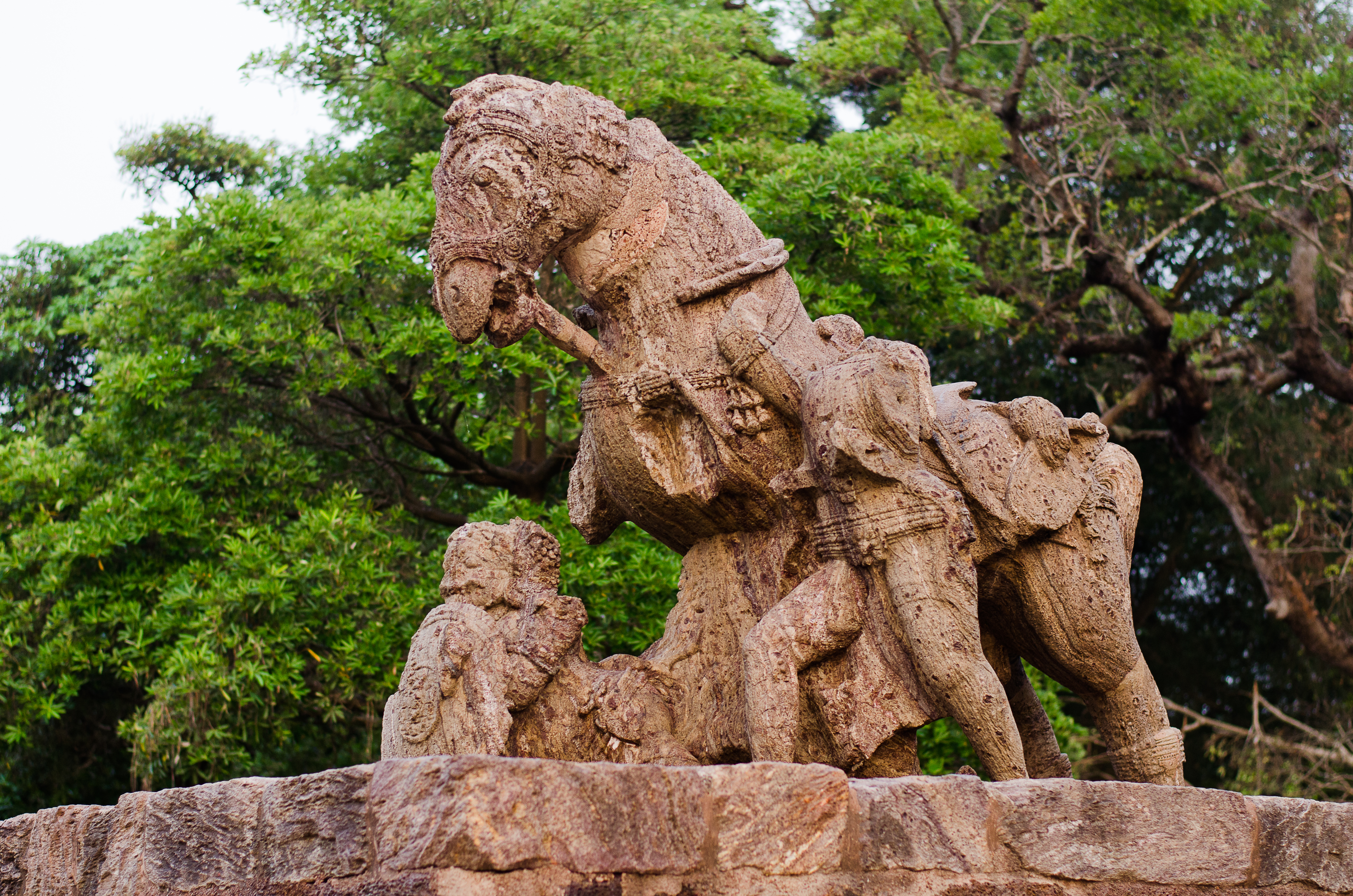
Warrior and Horse statue

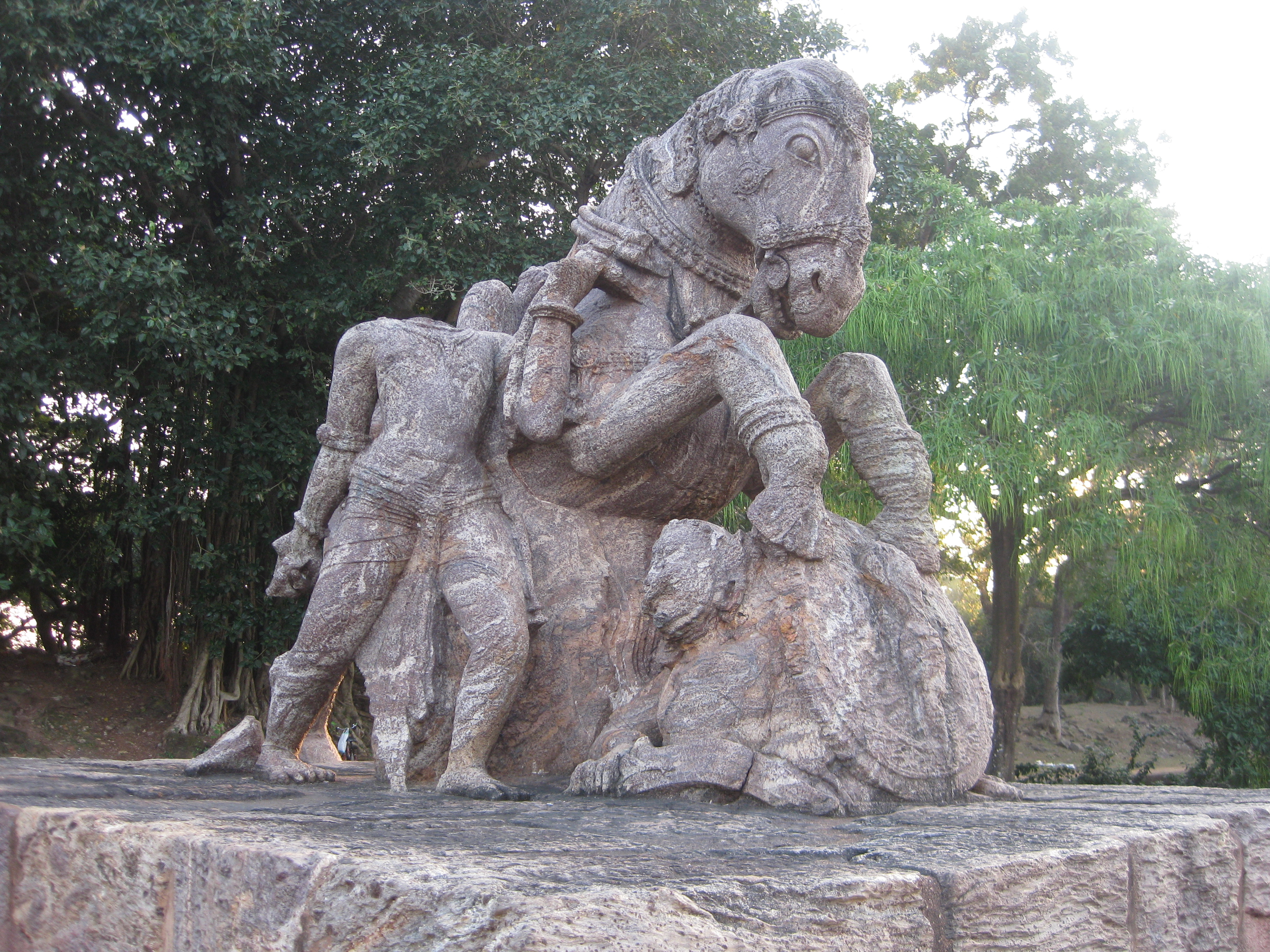
Warrior and Horse statue

The crest of the emblem incorporates the Lion Capital of Ashoka, which also forms the National Emblem of India. Below the lions appears the national motto, Satyameva Jayate ("Truth Alone Triumphs"), derived from the Mundaka Upanishad.

The words "Odisha Shasana" (Government of Odisha) are displayed in both Odia and Devanagari scripts, signifying the authority of the state government.

== Difference in Representation ==
The State Emblem of Odisha features a horseback warrior, inspired by the Sun Warrior statue at the Konark Sun Temple. However, a crucial distinction sets them apart: in the Konark statue, the horse is depicted crushing a Yavana (foreigner) warrior under its hoof, symbolizing the military valor of the Eastern Ganga dynasty. This powerful imagery in Konark commemorates the triumphs of Gajapati Langula Narasingha Deva I against the Delhi Sultanate, highlighting Odisha’s enduring legacy of resistance and conquest against external forces.

In contrast, the State Emblem of Odisha, this element: the Yavana warrior being crushed has been deliberately omitted. Instead, the emblem retains only the warrior on horseback, emphasizing Odisha’s martial tradition and resilience but without explicitly referencing any historical enemy. The removal of the original war depiction is likely due to political and diplomatic considerations, as modern state symbols tend to present a neutral and inclusive narrative rather than highlighting historical conflicts.

Note: This distinction is not widely known. The omission of the Yavana warrior is only in the emblem, whereas in physical statues, the original depiction remains intact, as seen in the Sun Warrior statue at Konark. Similar representations can be found at Master Canteen Square and in front of the Odisha Legislative Assembly.

== Usage and Government banner ==
The emblem is used by departments, agencies, and institutions of the Government of Odisha. It appears on official stationery, notifications, government websites, legislative publications, and other documents issued by state authorities. As an official governmental symbol, its use is restricted and governed by applicable laws and regulations concerning official insignia.

The Government of Odisha can be represented by a banner displaying the emblem of the state on a white field.

Banner of Odisha

== Historical emblems ==
Emblems of former Princely states and Zamindaris.

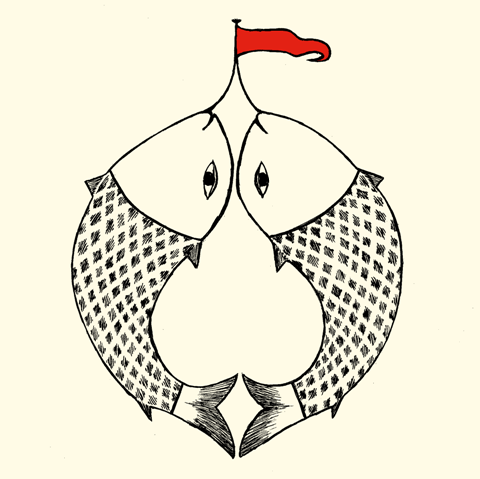
Dhenkanal State

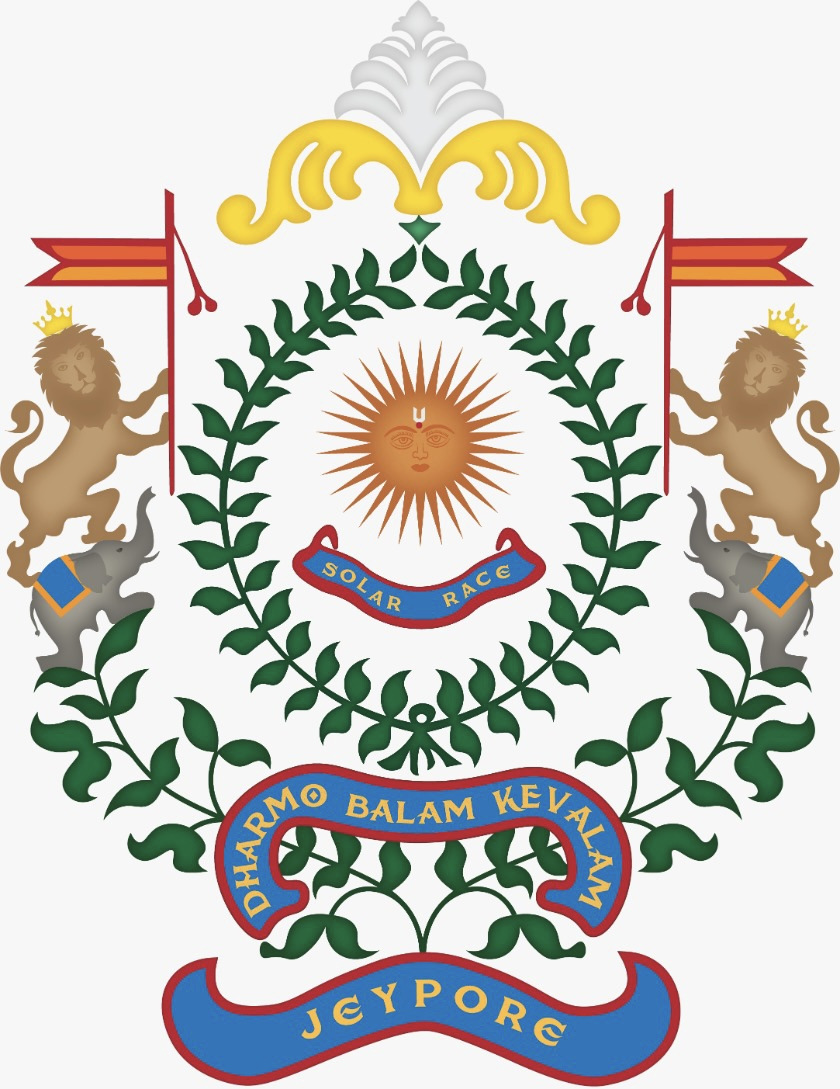
Jeypore Estate

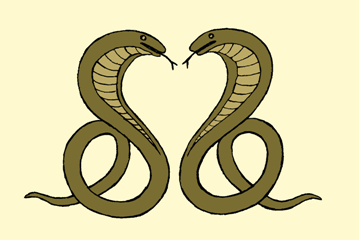
Kalahandi State

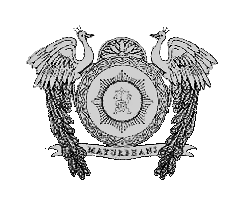
Mayurbhanj State

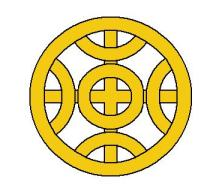
Sonepur State

== See also ==
- National Emblem of India
- List of Indian state emblems
- Government of Odisha
- List of Indian state emblems
