= Emblem of Ladakh =

Indian state government emblem

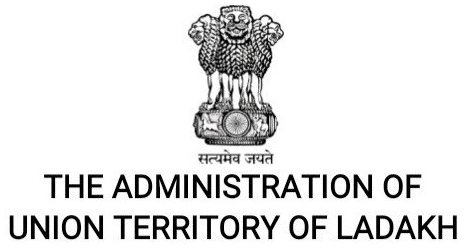
- Armiger: The Government of Ladakh
- Adopted: 31 October 2019
- Shield: Lion Capital of Ashoka
- Motto: "सत्यमेव जयते" (Satyameva Jayate, Sanskrit for "Truth Alone Triumphs")
- Use: On state government documents, buildings and stationery

The Emblem of Ladakh is the official state emblem of the Union Territory of Ladakh, India. It is carried on all official correspondences made by the Government of Ladakh.

== Historical symbols ==
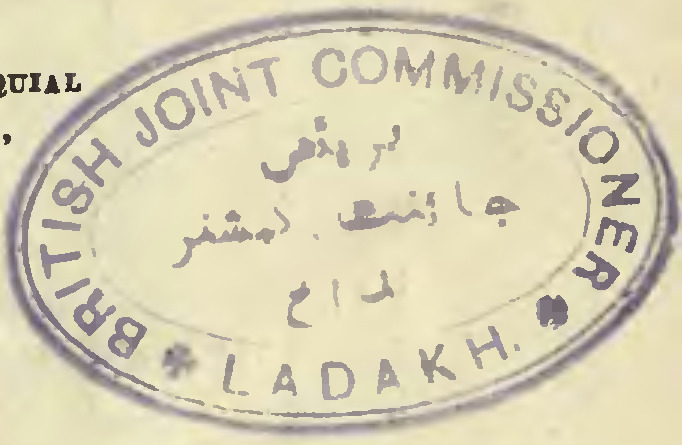
Seal of the British Joint Commissioner in Ladakh used during the period of British rule in India

== Government banner ==
The administration of Ladakh can be represented by a blue banner displaying the emblem India in silver with the words "THE ADMINISTRATION OF" inscribed above in an arc and the words "UT LADAKH (INDIA)" inscribed on a straight line below both in gold.

== See also ==
- National Emblem of India
- List of Indian state emblems
