= Emblem of Chandigarh =

- Armiger: The Government of Chandigarh
- Shield: Open Hand Monument
- Motto: "सत्यमेव जयते" (Satyameva Jayate, Sanskrit for "Truth Alone Triumphs")

The Emblem of Chandigarh is the official seal of the government of the Indian union territory of Chandigarh.

== Design ==
The emblem consists of a circular shield depicting a representation of Le Corbusier's Open Hand Monument sculpture which is widely regarded as a symbol of the city of Chandigarh. It signify the city's credo of "open to given, open to receive".

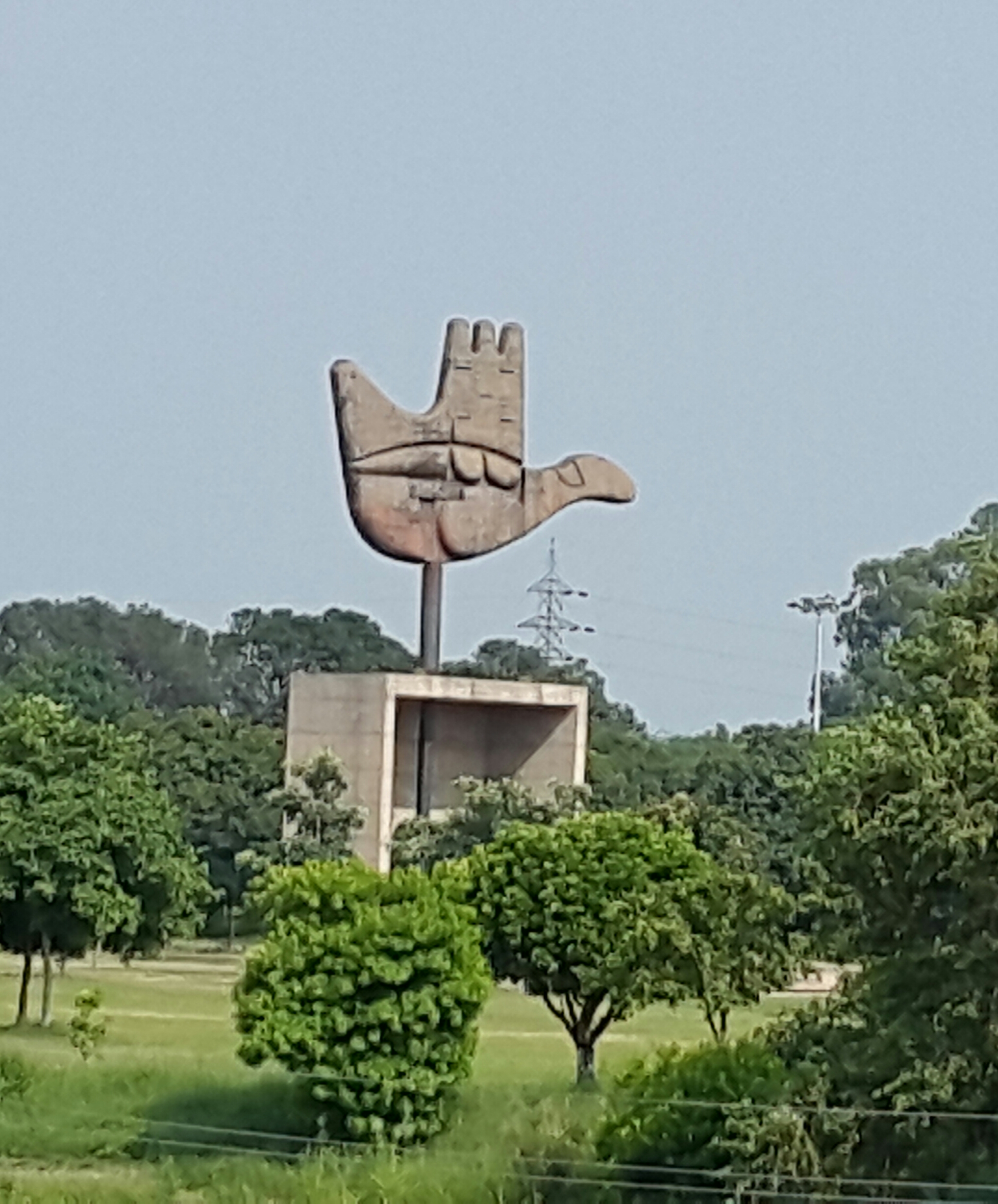
Open Hand Monument

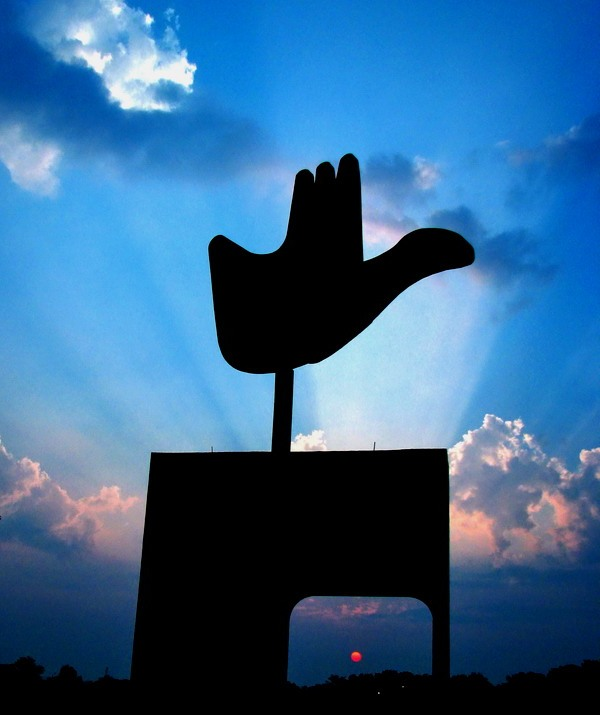
Open Hand Monument in silhouette

== Government banner ==
The administration of Chandigarh can be represented by a banner depicting the emblem of the territory on a white background.

== See also ==
- National Emblem of India
- List of Indian state emblems
