= Emblem of Madhya Pradesh =

Government seal of Indian state of Madhya Pradesh

- Armiger: The Government of Madhya Pradesh
- Shield: Lion Capital of Ashoka, Banyan tree
- Supporters: Wheat, Rice
- Other elements: 24 Stupas

The Emblem of Madhya Pradesh is the official seal of the government of the Indian state of Madhya Pradesh.

== Design ==
The emblem is a circular seal depicting the Lion Capital of Ashoka in front of a banyan tree. The Lion Capital and tree are supported by stalks of wheat and rice and the whole emblem is surrounded by 24 stupas figures.

== Historical emblems ==
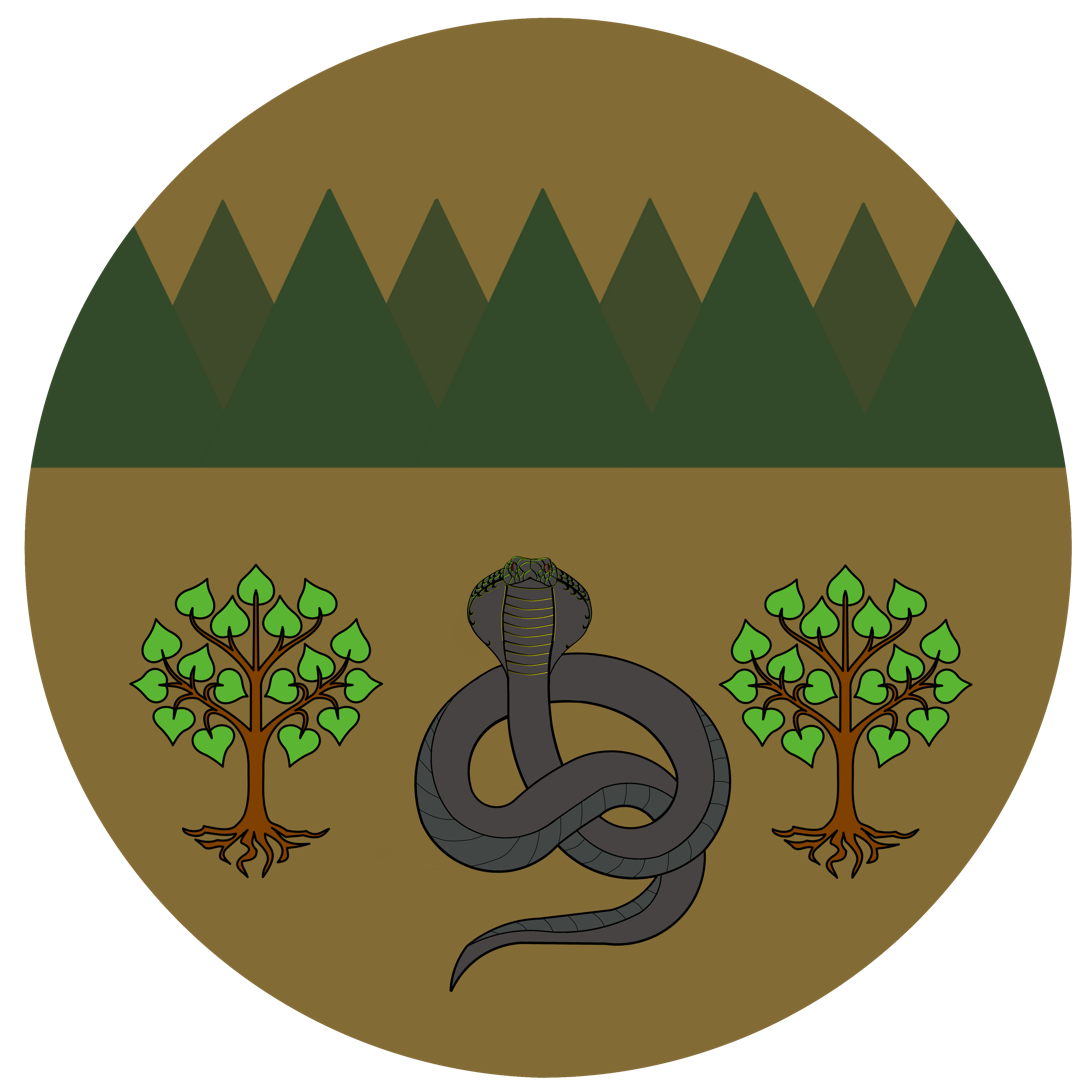
Emblem of Central Provinces and Berar during the British Raj

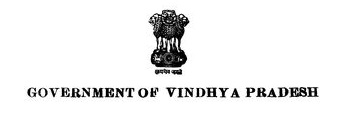
Emblem of the former state of Vindhya Pradesh

=== Princely states ===
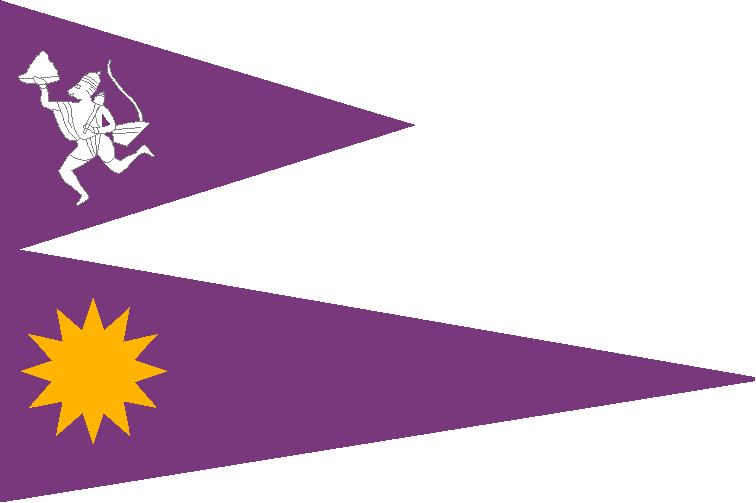
Ajaigarh State

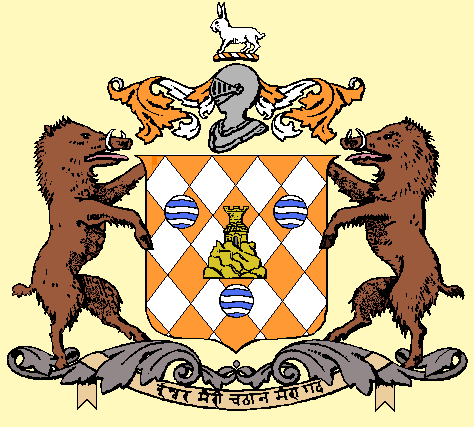
Alirajpur State

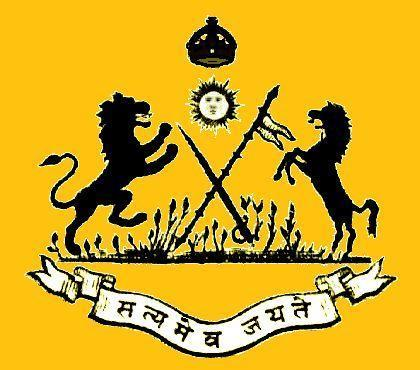
Baraundha

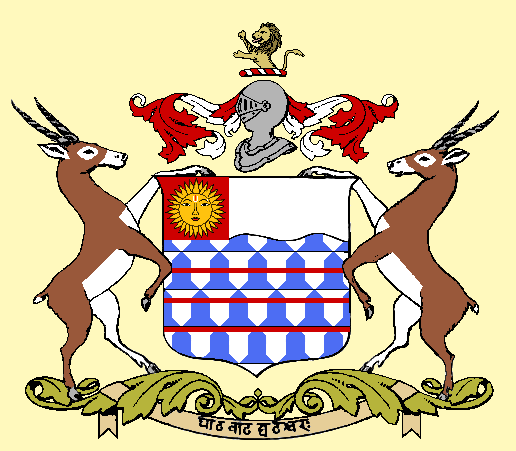
Barwani State

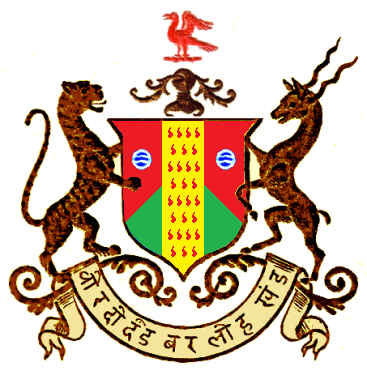
Bijawar State

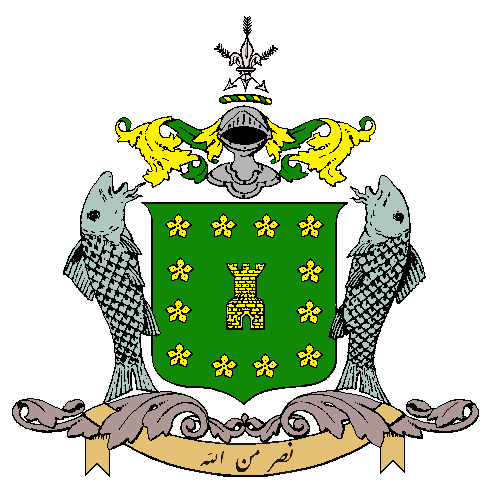
Bhopal State

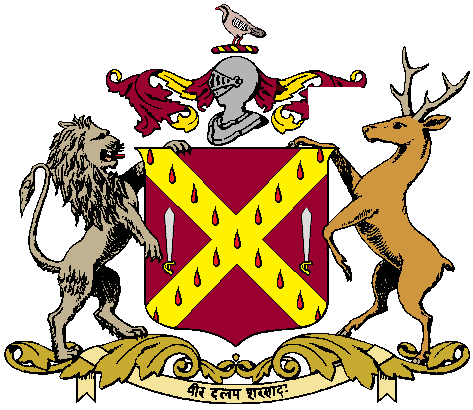
Datia State

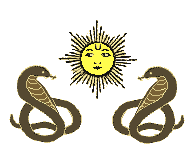
Gwalior State

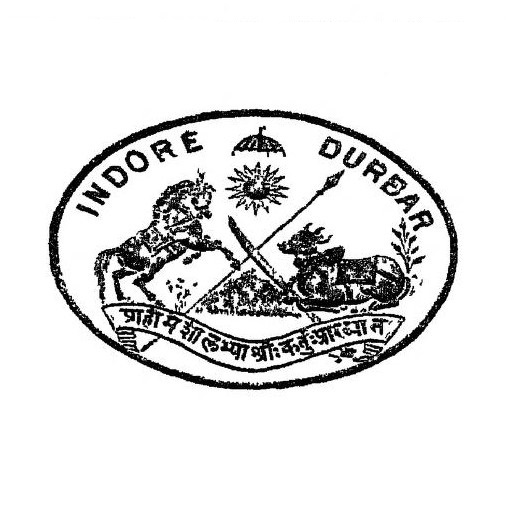
Indore State

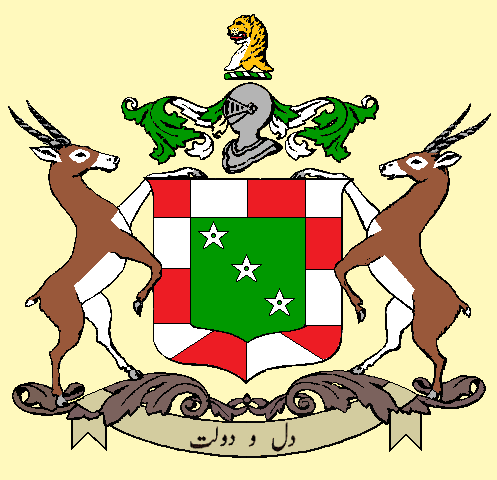
Jaora State

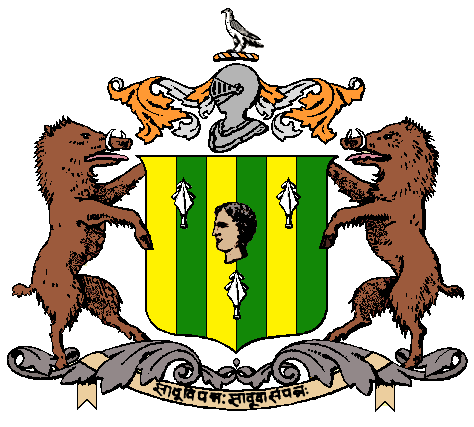
Jhabua State

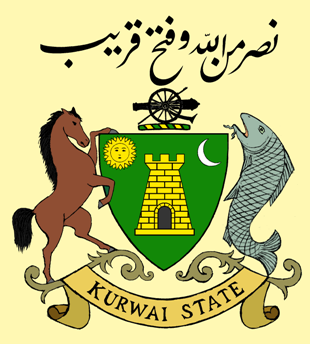
Kurwai State

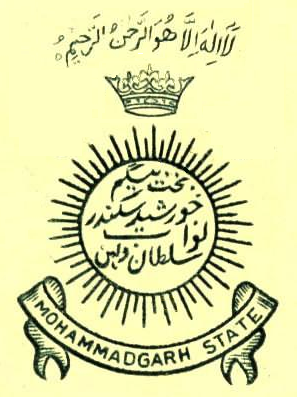
Mohammadgarh State

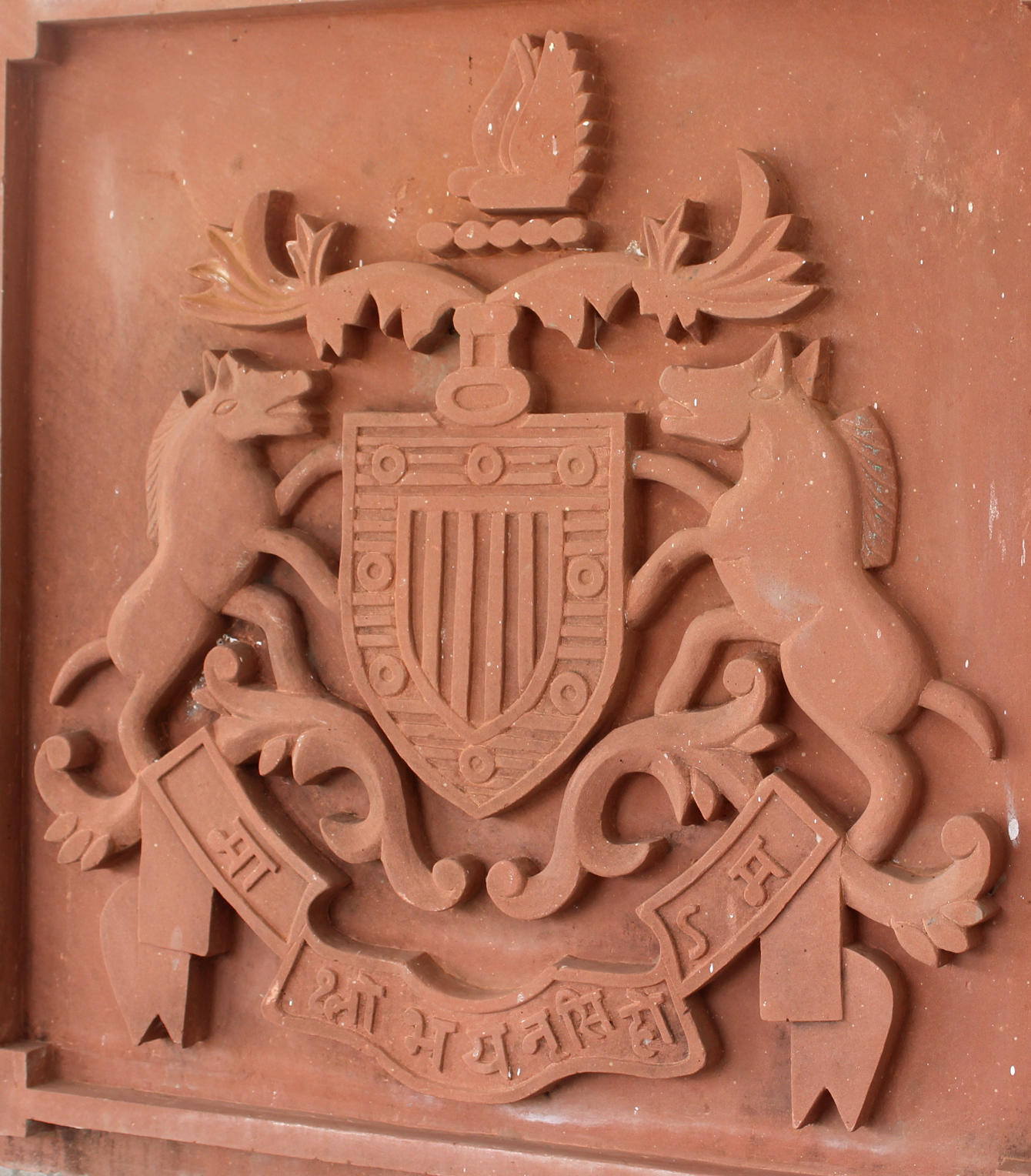
Narsinghgarh State

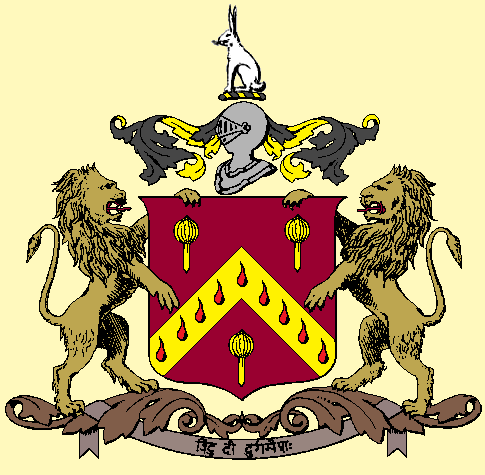
Orchha State

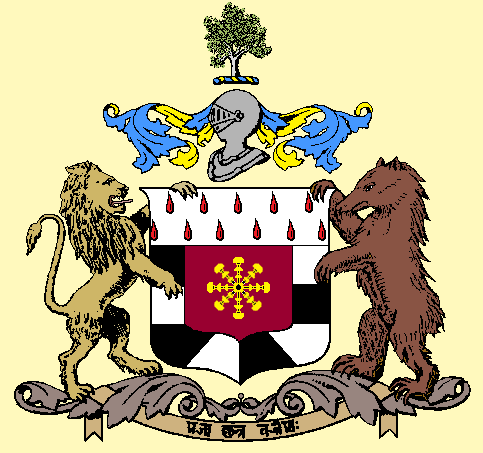
Panna State

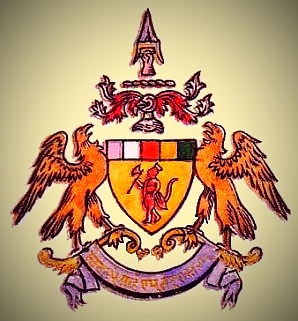
Ratlam State

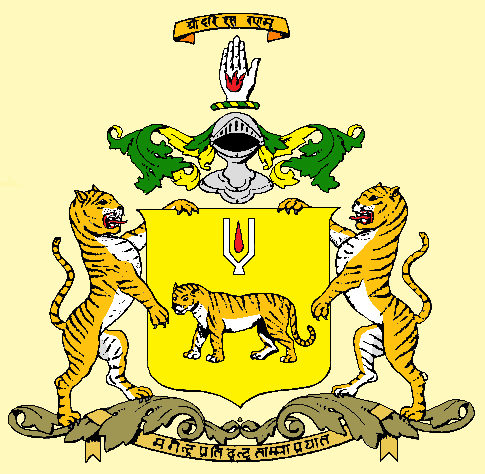
Rewa

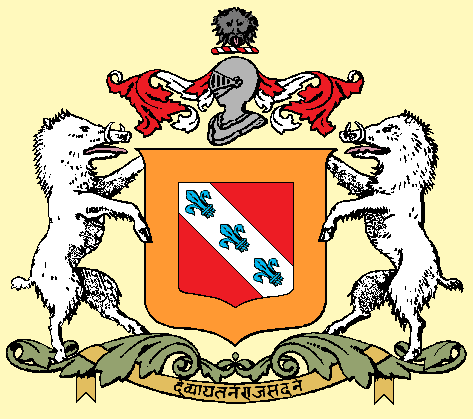
Sitamau State

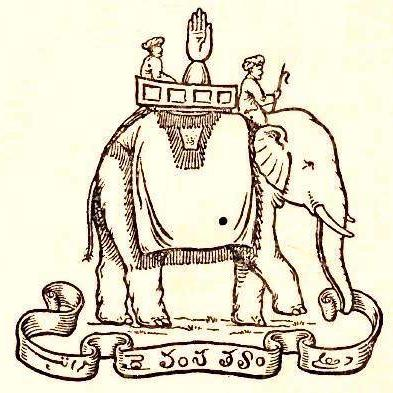
Venkatagiri estate

== Government banner ==
The Government of Madhya Pradesh can be represented by a banner displaying the emblem of the state on a white field.

Banner of Madhya Pradesh

== See also ==
- National Emblem of India
- List of Indian state emblems
