= Emblem of Haryana =

Haryana seal

- Armiger: The Government of Haryana
- Crest: Lion Capital of Ashoka
- Shield: Lotus blossom, sun rising over water
- Supporters: Wheat
- Motto: Govt. of Haryana
- Use: Representation of the State of Haryana

The Emblem of Haryana is the official seal of the Government of the Indian state of Haryana.

== Design ==
The emblem consists of a circular shield depicting a lotus blossom emerging out of water in front of a rising sun. The shield is supported by ears of wheat and the Lion Capital of Ashoka forms the crest.

== Government banner ==
The Government of Haryana can be represented by a banner displaying the emblem of the state on a white field.

Banner of Haryana (red)

Banner of Haryana (coloured)

== See also ==
- National Emblem of India
- List of Indian state emblems
