= Emblem of Manipur =

Indian state of Manipur seat seal

Versions
- Armiger: The Government of Manipur
- Adopted: 1980
- Shield: The Kanglā shā statue from the Kanglā place
- Other elements: Meitei: ꯀꯪꯂꯥꯁꯥ, romanized: Kanglasha inscribed on a scroll at the bottom

The Emblem of Manipur is the state emblem of Manipur, India. It was officially adopted by the state government on 18 December 1980.

== Design ==
The emblem features a Kanglāshā, a mythological creature that is half-lion and half-dragon.

== Historic emblems ==
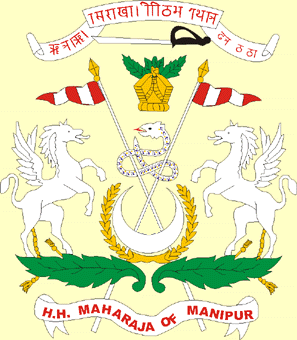
Coat of arms of the Kingdom of Manipur during British rule in India

Flag of the Kingdom of Manipur during British rule in India

== State government banner ==
The Government of Manipur can be represented by a banner displaying the emblem of the state on a white field.

== See also ==
- National Emblem of India
- List of Indian state emblems
