= Emblem of Chhattisgarh =

Seal of Indian state of Chhattisgarh

- Armiger: The Government of Chhattisgarh
- Adopted: 2001
- Shield: Lion Capital of Ashoka
- Supporters: Rice
- Compartment: Rivers, lightning bolts
- Motto: Chhattisgarh Sarkar (Government of Chhattisgarh)
- Other elements: 36 fortresses

The Emblem of Chhattisgarh is the official seal of the government of the Indian state of Chhattisgarh. It was adopted on 4 September 2001 when Chhattisgarh state was formed from part of Madhya Pradesh.

== Design ==
The emblem is a circular seal depicting the Lion Capital of Ashoka encircled by ears of rice. Below the capital are three wavy lines in the colours of the Indian national flag, which represent the rivers of the state, flanked by two lightning bolts which represent as Energy Surplus State. The whole emblem is surrounded by 36 fortifications representing the 36 fortresses after which the state is named.

== Government banner ==
The Government of Chhattisgarh can be represented by a banner displaying the emblem of the state on a white field.

== See also ==
- National Emblem of India
- List of Indian state emblems
