= List of Indian state emblems =

State seals of India

The Republic of India is made up of 28 states and eight union territories. Most states and union territories have their own representative emblem, seal or coat of arms which is used as the official governmental symbol, four states and five union territories use the National Emblem of India for official purposes.

== States ==
State	Seal	Image
Andhra Pradesh	Emblem of Andhra Pradesh	
Arunachal Pradesh	Emblem of Arunachal Pradesh	
Assam	Emblem of Assam	
Bihar	Emblem of Bihar	
Chhattisgarh	Emblem of Chhattisgarh	
Goa	Emblem of Goa	
Gujarat	Emblem of Gujarat	
Haryana	Emblem of Haryana	
Himachal Pradesh	Emblem of Himachal Pradesh	
Jharkhand	Emblem of Jharkhand	
Karnataka	Emblem of Karnataka	
Kerala	Emblem of Kerala	
Madhya Pradesh	Emblem of Madhya Pradesh	
Maharashtra	Emblem of Maharashtra	
Manipur	Emblem of Manipur	
Meghalaya	Emblem of Meghalaya	
Mizoram	Emblem of Mizoram	
Nagaland	Emblem of Nagaland	State emblem of Nagaland
Odisha	Emblem of Odisha	
Punjab	Emblem of Punjab	This is the Seal of Government of Punjab.
Rajasthan	Emblem of Rajasthan	
Sikkim	Emblem of Sikkim	
Tamil Nadu	Emblem of Tamil Nadu	
Telangana	Emblem of Telangana	
Tripura	Emblem of Tripura	
Uttar Pradesh	Emblem of Uttar Pradesh	
Uttarakhand	Emblem of Uttarakhand	
West Bengal	Emblem of West Bengal	Please check "Egiye Bangla / Official Portal of Govt of West Bengal" https://wb.gov.in/ for official approved WB Govt. Seal/Emblem.

== Union territories ==
Union Territory	Seal	Image
Andaman and Nicobar Islands	Emblem of Andaman and Nicobar Islands	
Chandigarh	Emblem of Chandigarh	
Dadra and Nagar Haveli and Daman and Diu	Emblem of Dadra and Nagar Haveli and Daman and Diu	
Delhi	Emblem of Delhi	
Jammu and Kashmir	Emblem of Jammu and Kashmir	
Ladakh	Emblem of Ladakh	
Lakshadweep	Emblem of Lakshadweep	
Puducherry	Emblem of Puducherry	

== Autonomous administrative divisions ==
Some of the autonomous administrative divisions established by the Sixth Schedule of the Constitution of India have adopted their own symbols.

Autonomous Administrative Division	Emblem	Image
Bodoland Territorial Council	Uses a seal based on the National Emblem of India	
Deori Autonomous Council	Emblem of Deori Autonomous Council	
Garo Hills Autonomous District Council	Emblem of Garo Hills Autonomous District Council	
Jaintia Hills Autonomous District Council	Emblem of Jaintia Hills Autonomous District Council	
Kamatapur Autonomous Council	Emblem of Kamatapur Autonomous Council	
Karbi Anglong Autonomous Council	Emblem of Karbi Anglong Autonomous Council	
Khasi Hills Autonomous District Council	Emblem of Khasi Hills Autonomous District Council	
Lai Autonomous District Council	Emblem of Lai Autonomous District Council	
Mara Autonomous District Council	Emblem of Mara Autonomous District Council	
Mising Autonomous Council	Emblem of Mising Autonomous Council	
North Cachar Hills Autonomous Council	Emblem of North Cachar Hills Autonomous Council	
Rabha Hasong Autonomous Council	Emblem of Rabha Hasong Autonomous Council	
Gorkhaland Territorial Administration	Emblem of Gorkhaland Territorial Administration	

== See also ==
- Lion Capital of Ashoka
- National Emblem of India
