= Satyameva Jayate =

National motto of India

Translations of Satyameva Jayate
- English: Truth Alone Triumphs
- Sanskrit: सत्यमेव जयते (IAST: Satyameva Jayate)
- Assamese: সত্যমেৱ জয়তে
- Bengali: সত্যমেব জয়তে
- Bhojpuri: 𑂮𑂞𑂹𑂨𑂧𑂵𑂫 𑂔𑂨𑂞𑂵
- Hindi: Satyameva Jayate
- Kannada: ಸತ್ಯಮೇವ ಜಯತೇ
- Kashmiri: 𑆱𑆠𑇀𑆪𑆩𑆼𑆮 𑆘𑆪𑆠𑆼
- Malayalam: സത്യമേവ ജയതേ
- Marathi: सत्यमेव जयते
- Meitei: ꯁꯇ꯭ꯌꯃꯦꯋ ꯖꯌꯇꯦ
- Odia: ସତ୍ୟମେବ ଜୟତେ
- Punjabi: ਸੱਤਿਆਮੇਵ ਜਯਤੇ
- Tamil: வாய்மையே வெல்லும்
- Telugu: సత్యమేవ జయతే
- Gujarati: સત્યમેવ જયતે

Satyameva Jayate (transl. 'Truth Alone Triumphs') is a part of a mantra from the Hindu scripture Mundaka Upanishad. Following the independence of India, it was adopted as the national motto of India on 26 January 1950, the day India became a republic. In the national emblem of India, it is inscribed in the Devanagari script below the Lion Capital of Ashoka and forms an integral part of the emblem. The emblem, including "Satyameva Jayate", is inscribed on one side of all Indian currency and national documents.

The State Emblem of India contains the phrase Satyameva Jayate.

== Origin ==
The origin of the motto is the mantra 3.1.6 from the Mundaka Upanishad, which reads:

In the Devanāgarī script

सत्यमेव जयते नानृतं सत्येन पन्था विततो देवयानः।
येनाक्रमन्त्यृषयो ह्याप्तकामा यत्र तत् सत्यस्य परमं निधानम्॥

Transliteration

satyameva jayate nānṛtaṃ
satyena panthā vitato devayānaḥ
yenākramantyṛṣayo hyāptakāmā
yatra tat satyasya paramaṃ nidhānam

In English

Truth Alone Triumphs; not falsehood.
Through truth the divine path is spread out
by which the sages whose desires have been completely fulfilled,
reach to where is that supreme treasure of Truth.

The phrase is composed of the words satyam 'truth', eva 'indeed' (emphatic particle), and jayate 'conquers'.

== Popular connotations ==
Popular connotations also include:

- 'Truth stands Invincible'
- 'Truth alone conquers, not falsehood'
- 'The true prevails, not the untrue'
- 'Veritas Vincit', a direct Latin translation.
- 'Truth alone conquers, not untruth'
- 'Truth Alone Triumphs, not that against Sacred law (Rta)
- Vaymaiye Vellum (Tamil: வாய்மையே வெல்லும்)

The slogan was popularised and brought into the national lexicon by Pandit Madan Mohan Malaviya in 1918 when serving his second of four terms as president of the Indian National Congress.

== See also ==
- Veritas vincit – the national motto of the Czech Republic that has the same meaning.
