= Outline of Uttar Pradesh =

Overview of and topical guide to Uttar Pradesh

Location of Uttar Pradesh

The following outline is provided as an overview of and topical guide to Uttar Pradesh:

Uttar Pradesh – most populous state in the Republic of India as well as the most populous country subdivision in the world. It was created on 1 April 1937 as the United Provinces during British rule, and was renamed Uttar Pradesh in 1950. Lucknow is the capital city of Uttar Pradesh. Ghaziabad, Meerut, Muzaffarnagar, Kanpur, Gorakhpur, Allahabad, Raebareli, Moradabad, Bareilly, Aligarh, Sonbhadra, and Varanasi are known for their industrial importance in the state. On 9 November 2000, a new state, Uttarakhand, was carved out from the Himalayan hill region of Uttar Pradesh. The state in the northern region of the Indian subcontinent has over 200 million inhabitants.

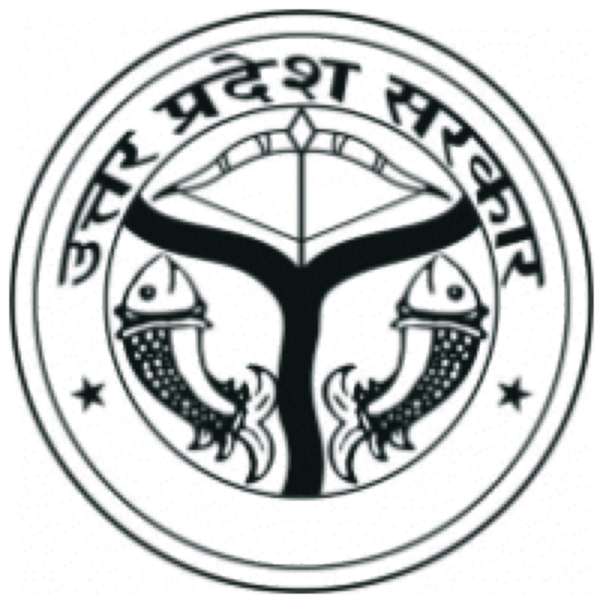
Seal of Uttar Pradesh

== General reference ==
=== Names ===
- Common English name: Uttar Pradesh
  - Pronunciation: English: /ˌʊtər prəˈdɛʃ/, Hindi: [ˈʊtːəɾ pɾəˈdeːʃ]
- Official English name(s): State of Uttar Pradesh
- Abbreviation: U.P.
- UN/LOCODE: IN-UP
- Nickname(s): Scotland of East (unofficial)
- Adjectival(s): Uttar Pradeshi
- Demonym(s): Uttar Pradeshis

=== Rankings (amongst India's states) ===
- by population: 1st
- by area (2011 census): 4th
- by crime rate (2015): 27th
- by gross domestic product (GDP) (2014): 3rd
- by Human Development Index (HDI): 10th
- by life expectancy at birth: 20th
- by literacy rate: 29th

== Geography of Uttar Pradesh ==
Geography of Uttar Pradesh

- Uttar Pradesh is: an Indian state
- Population of Uttar Pradesh: 199,812,341 (2011)
- Area of Uttar Pradesh: 243,290 km^{2}(93,930 sq mi)
- Atlas of Uttar Pradesh

=== Location of Uttar Pradesh ===
- Uttar Pradesh is situated within the following regions:
  - Northern Hemisphere
  - Eastern Hemisphere
    - Eurasia
      - Asia
        - South Asia
          - Indian subcontinent
            - India
              - North India
- Time zone: Indian Standard Time (UTC+05:30)

=== Environment of Uttar Pradesh ===
- Climate of Uttar Pradesh

Places in Uttar Pradesh

Places in Uttar Pradesh

List of historic places in Uttar Pradesh

List of bridges in Uttar Pradesh

List of parks in Uttar Pradesh

List of museums in Uttar Pradesh

=== Environment of Uttar Pradesh ===
Environment of Uttar Pradesh

Climate of Uttar Pradesh

Natural History of Uttar Pradesh

Forests in Uttar Pradesh

Flora of Uttar Pradesh

Fauna of Uttar Pradesh

Mammals in Uttar Pradesh

Birds of Uttar Pradesh

==== Geographical features of Uttar Pradesh ====
Lakes of Uttar Pradesh

Rivers of Uttar Pradesh

Mountains of Uttar Pradesh

Regions of Uttar Pradesh

==== Administrative divisions of Uttar Pradesh ====
Administrative divisions of Uttar Pradesh

List of districts of Uttar Pradesh

- Districts of Uttar Pradesh

===== Municipalities of Uttar Pradesh =====
Municipalities of Uttar Pradesh

- Capital of Uttar Pradesh: Lucknow
- Cities of Uttar Pradesh

=== Demography of Uttar Pradesh ===
Demographics of Uttar Pradesh

== Government and politics of Uttar Pradesh ==
Politics of Uttar Pradesh

- Form of government: Indian state government (parliamentary system of representative democracy)
- Uttar Pradesh State Capitol
- Capital of Uttar Pradesh: Lucknow
- Political Party strength in Uttar Pradesh
- Elections in Uttar Pradesh
  - (specific elections)

=== Union government in Uttar Pradesh ===
- Rajya Sabha members from Uttar Pradesh
- Uttar Pradesh Pradesh Congress Committee
- Indian general election, 2009 (Uttar Pradesh)
- Indian general election, 2014 (Uttar Pradesh)

=== Branches of the government of Uttar Pradesh ===
Government of Uttar Pradesh

==== Executive branch of the government of Uttar Pradesh ====
- Head of state: Governor of Uttar Pradesh: Ram Naik (19th governor)
- Head of government: Chief Minister of Uttar Pradesh: Yogi Adityanath (21st chief minister)
- Council of Ministers of Uttar Pradesh

==== Legislative branch of the government of Uttar Pradesh ====
Uttar Pradesh Legislative Assembly

- Constituencies of Uttar Pradesh Legislative Assembly

==== Judicial branch of the government of Uttar Pradesh ====
Allahabad High Court

Courts in Uttar Pradesh

=== Law and order in Uttar Pradesh ===
- Law of Uttar Pradesh
- Constitution of India
- Capital Punishment in Uttar Pradesh
- List of people executed in Uttar Pradesh
- Crime in Uttar Pradesh
- List of prisons in Uttar Pradesh
- Law enforcement in Uttar Pradesh
  - Uttar Pradesh Police

== History of Uttar Pradesh ==
History of Uttar Pradesh

=== History of Uttar Pradesh, by topics ===
MPL winner

World Asia record holder

Rajesh prasad Sah, MPL grand League winner of 2020 he won 7.70crore Dharikshan Mishr, Bhojpuri language poet Sachchidananda Vatsyayan 'Agyeya', noted Hindi writer.

==== Indian Rebellion of 1857 ====
Prehistory of Uttar Pradesh

Uttar Pradesh under British Rule

Uttar Pradesh under Mughal rule

United Provinces

United Provinces of Agra and Oudh

Creation of Uttrakhand

British Raj

Mughal Empire

Dominion of India

Timeline of Uttar Pradesh

=== History of Uttar Pradesh, by region ===
History of Allahabad

History of Lucknow

History of Kanpur

History of Aligarh, Uttar Pradesh

History of Jhansi

History of Agra

History of Varanasi

History of Noida

History of Ayodhya

History of Gorakhpur

History of Muzaffarnagar

History of Meerut

History of Bareilly

=== History of Uttar Pradesh, by subject ===
History of education in Uttar Pradesh

History of Uttar Pradesh police

History of Islam in Uttar Pradesh

History of Hinduism in Uttar Pradesh

History of Christianity in Uttar Pradesh

History of Buddhism in Uttar Pradesh

History of sports in Uttar Pradesh

== Culture of Uttar Pradesh ==
Culture of Uttar Pradesh

- Architecture of Uttar Pradesh
- Languages of Uttar Pradesh
- Museums in Uttar Pradesh
- Religion in Uttar Pradesh
- Cuisine of Uttar Pradesh
- Monuments in Uttar Pradesh
  - Monuments of National Importance in Uttar Pradesh
  - State Protected Monuments in Uttar Pradesh
- Public holidays in Uttar Pradesh
- Records of Uttar Pradesh
- World Heritage Sites in Uttar Pradesh

=== Art in Uttar Pradesh ===
- Music of Uttar Pradesh

=== People of Uttar Pradesh ===
- People from Uttar Pradesh

=== Religion in Uttar Pradesh ===
Religion in Uttar Pradesh

- Christianity in Uttar Pradesh
- Hinduism in Uttar Pradesh
- Islam in Uttar Pradesh
- Buddhism in Uttar Pradesh
- Jainism in Uttar Pradesh
- Sikhism in Uttar Pradesh

=== Sports in Uttar Pradesh ===
Sports in Uttar Pradesh

- Cricket in Uttar Pradesh
  - Uttar Pradesh Cricket Association
  - Uttar Pradesh cricket team
- Football in Uttar Pradesh
  - Uttar Pradesh football team

=== Symbols of Uttar Pradesh ===
Symbols of Uttar Pradesh

- State animal: Barasingha
- State bird: Sarus crane
- State flower: Palash
- State seal: Emblem of Uttar Pradesh
- State tree: Ashoka tree
- Nickname(s): Scotland of the East (unofficial)

== Economy and infrastructure of Uttar Pradesh ==
- Tourism in Uttar Pradesh
- Communication in Uttar Pradesh
- Newspapers in Uttar Pradesh
- Radio stations in Uttar Pradesh
- Economy of Uttar Pradesh
- Infrastructure of Uttar Pradesh
- Transport in Uttar Pradesh
  - Airports in Uttar Pradesh
  - Roads in Uttar Pradesh

== Education in Uttar Pradesh ==
Education in Uttar Pradesh

- Institutions of higher education in Uttar Pradesh
- List of schools in Uttar Pradesh

== Health in Uttar Pradesh ==
Health in Uttar Pradesh

Hospitals in Uttar Pradesh

== See also ==
- Outline of India
- Uttar Pradesh
- Uttar Pradesh Legislative Assembly
- Uttar Pradesh Police
- Uttar Pradesh Power Corporation Limited
- Government of Uttar Pradesh
