= History of the horse in the Indian subcontinent =

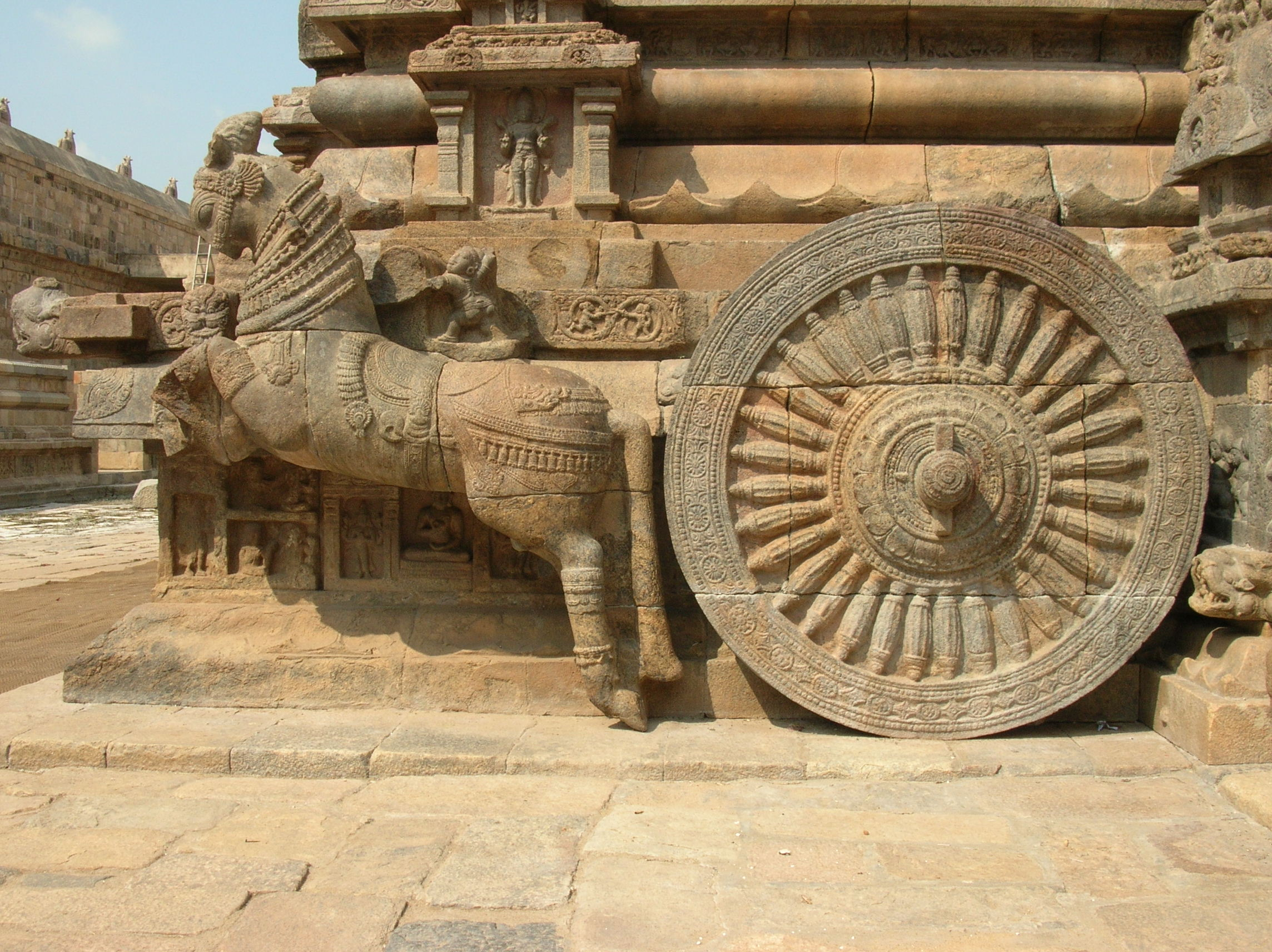
Horse-drawn chariot carved onto the mandapam of Airavatesvara Temple, Darasuram, c. 12th century.

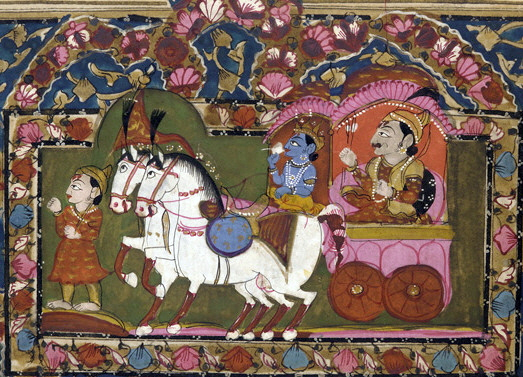
Krishna, Arjuna at Kurukshetra, 18th- to 19th-century painting.

The horse has been present in the Indian subcontinent from at least the middle of the second millennium BC, more than two millennia after its domestication in Central Asia. The earliest uncontroversial evidence of horse remains on the Indian Subcontinent date to the early Swat culture (around 1600 BCE). While horse remains and related artifacts have been found in Late Harappan (1900-1300 BCE) sites, indicating that horses may have been present at Late Harappan times, horses did not play an essential role in the Harappan civilisation, in contrast to the Vedic period (1500-500 BCE). The importance of the horse for the Indo-Aryans is indicated by the Sanskrit word Ashva, "horse," which is often mentioned in the Vedas and Hindu scriptures.

== Paleolithic ==
During the Late Pleistocene, a species of equine, Equus namadicus, was native to the subcontinent, but it was extinct by the start of the Holocene. Equus namadicus is considered a "stenonine horse", meaning that it is probably more closely related to zebras and asses than to true horses.

== Domestication ==
Domestication of the horse before the second millennium BC appears to be confined to its native habitat, the Great Steppe. There is increasing evidence that horses were domesticated in the Eurasian Steppes around 3500 BC. Recent discoveries in the context of the Botai culture suggest that Botai settlements in the Akmola Province of Kazakhstan are the location of the earliest domestication of the horse.

Use of horses spread across Eurasia for transportation, agricultural work, and warfare. The horse only appears in Mesopotamia from around 1800 BC as a ridden animal and acquires military significance with the invention of the chariot.

== Indus Valley Civilisation ==
Proponents of Indigenous Aryanism believe that the Indus Valley Civilisation was Aryan and Vedic. There are two common objections against such a correlation: "the Rg Vedic culture was pastoral and horse-centered, while the Harappan culture was neither horse-centered nor pastoral"; (Note: R.S. Sharma (1995), as quoted in Bryant 2001) and "the complete absence of the modern horse (equus caballus)." (Note: Parpola (1994), as quoted in Bryant 2001) Support for the idea of an indigenous Indo-Aryan origin of the Indus Valley Civilisation mostly exists among Indian scholars of Hindu religion and the history and archaeology of India, and has no support in mainstream scholarship. (Note: No support in mainstream scholarship: Thapar 2006: "there is no scholar at this time seriously arguing for the indigenous origin of Aryans".; Wendy Doniger (2017): "The opposing argument, that speakers of Indo-European languages were indigenous to the Indian subcontinent, is not supported by any reliable scholarship. It is now championed primarily by Hindu nationalists, whose religious sentiments have led them to regard the theory of Aryan migration with some asperity." (Note: Wendy Doniger (2017), "Another Great Story"", review of Asko Parpola's The Roots of Hinduism; in: Inference, International Review of Science, Volume 3, Issue 2); Girish Shahane (September 14, 2019), in response to Narasimhan et al. (2019): "Hindutva activists, however, have kept the Aryan Invasion Theory alive, because it offers them the perfect strawman, 'an intentionally misrepresented proposition that is set up because it is easier to defeat than an opponent's real argument' ... The Out of India hypothesis is a desperate attempt to reconcile linguistic, archaeological and genetic evidence with Hindutva sentiment and nationalistic pride, but it cannot reverse time's arrow ... The evidence keeps crushing Hindutva ideas of history." (Note: Girish Shahane (September 14, 2019), Why Hindutva supporters love to hate the discredited Aryan Invasion Theory, Scroll.in); Koenraad Elst (May 10, 2016): "Of course it is a fringe theory, at least internationally, where the Aryan Invasion Theory (AIT) is still the official paradigm. In India, though, it has the support of most archaeologists, who fail to find a trace of this Aryan influx and instead find cultural continuity."; Witzel 2001, p. 95: [the] "indigenous Aryans" position is not scholarship in the usual sense, but an "apologetic, ultimately religious undertaking":)

The paucity of horse remains in pre-Vedic times could be explained by India's climatic factors which lead to decay of horse bones. Horse bones may also be rare because horses were probably not eaten or used in burials by the Harappans. Remains and artifacts ascribed to domesticated horses are limited to Late Harappan times (Note: The finds include deposits at Mahagara near Allahabad, dated to around 2265 BC to 1480 BC, described as Equus ferus caballus Linn; (Note: Sharma et al. (1980) p.220-221, as cited in Bryant 2001, p. 170) Hallur in Karnataka, c.1500 - 1300 BC, described as Equus ferus caballus; (Note: Alur 1971 p.123, as cited in Bryant 2001, p. 170) Mohenjo-Daro; (Note: Sewell and Guha (1931), as cited in Bryant 2001, p. 270) Harappa ("small horse"); (Note: Bholanath (1963), as cited in Bryant 2001, p. 270) Lothal, a terracotta figurine and a molar horse tooth, dated to 2200 BC; (Note: Bholanath (1963), as cited in Bryant 2001, p. 270) Kalibangan; (Note: Sharma 1992-1993, as cited in Bryant 2001, p. 271) and Kuntasi, dated to 2300–1900 BC. (Note: Sharma (1995) p.24, as cited in Bryant 2001, p. 271) An alleged clay model of a horse has been found in Mohenjo-Daro and an alleged horse figurine in Periano Ghundai in the Indus Valley. (Note: Bryant 2001, p. 171, with reference to Mackay 1938 and Piggott 1952.) According to Erwin Neumayer, Daimabad bronze "chariot" had "a yoke fit for the neck of horses rather than cattle." (Note: Chariots in the Chalcolithic Rock Art of Indian A Slide Show, Neumayer Erwin) According to Pigott (1970), various copper vehicle toys having animals with arched neck, described as bulls by some scholars, possibly are of horses. Several chalcolithic period scenes depicted in rock art of India show chariot driven by horses as well. A daimabad cylinder seal dated to 1400-1000 BC depicts a horse driven cart.) indicating that horses may have been present at Late Harappan times, "when the Vedic people had settled in the north-west part of the subcontinent." It can therefore not be concluded that the horse was regularly used, or played a significant role, in the Harappan society.

Horse remains from the Harappan site Surkotada (dated to 2400-1700 BC) have been identified by A.K. Sharma as Equus ferus caballus. (Note: Sharma (1974), as cited in Bryant 2001, p. 271) The horse specialist Sandor Bökönyi (1997) later confirmed these conclusions, and stated the excavated tooth specimens could "in all probability be considered remnants of true horses [i.e. Equus ferus caballus]". (Note: Bökönyi (1997), as cited in Bryant 2001, p. 272) Bökönyi, as cited by B. B. Lal, stated that "The occurrence of true horse (Equus caballus L.) was evidenced by the enamel pattern of the upper and lower cheek and teeth and by the size and form of incisors and phalanges (toe bones)." (Note: Lal 1998, p. 111, quoted from Bökönyi's letter to the Director of the Archaeological Survey of India, 1993-12-13.) However, archaeologists like Meadow (1997) disagree, on the grounds that the remains of the Equus ferus caballus horse are difficult to distinguish from other equid species such as Equus asinus (donkeys) or Equus hemionus (onagers).

Colin Renfrew (1999) remarked that "the significance of the horse [...] has been much exaggerated." (Note: Renfrew's statement refers to his own Anatolian hypothesis, which is criticized by mainstream scholarship on similar grounds.)

== Vedic period ==
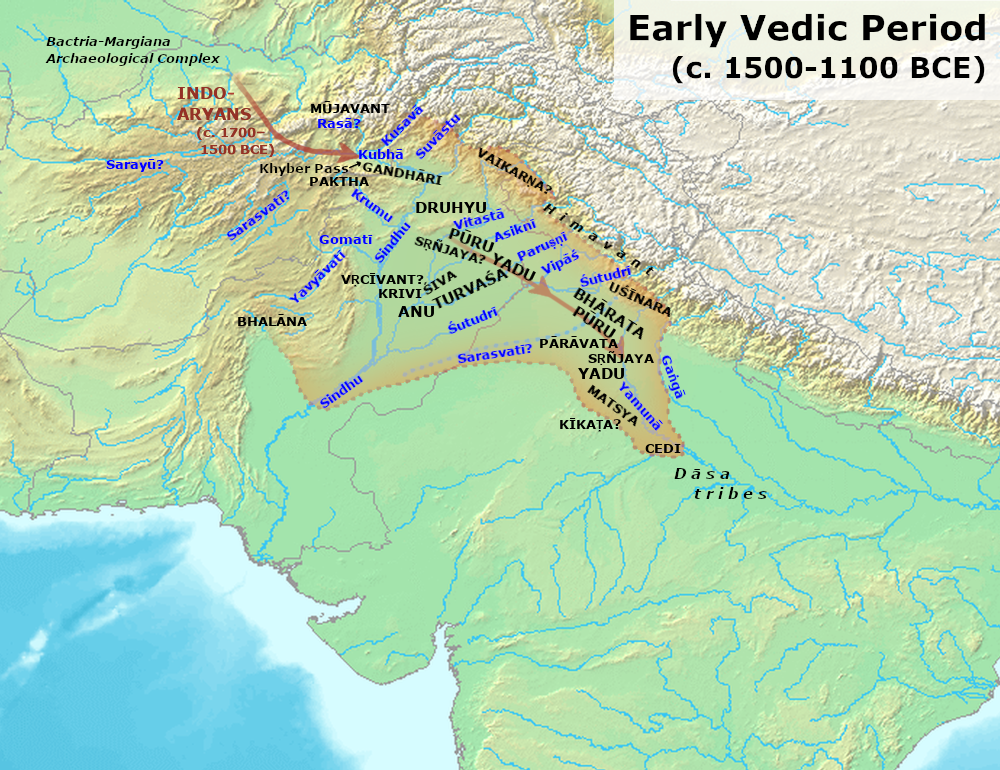
Early Vedic Period.

Sites such as the BMAC complex are at least as poor in horse remains as the Harappan sites. (Note: Hastinapur (8th century BCE) is likewise poor in horse remains, even though it is considered as Indo-Aryan.) The earliest undisputed finds of horse remains in South Asia are from the Gandhara grave culture, also known as the Swat culture (c. 1400–800 BCE), related to the Indo-Aryans and coinciding with their arrival in India. Swat valley grave DNA analysis provides evidence of "connections between [Central Asian] Steppe population and early Vedic culture in India".

Horses were important in the lifestyle of the Indo-Europeans. Ashva, a Sanskrit word for a horse, is one of the significant animals referred to in the Vedas and several other Hindu scriptures, and many personal names in the Rigveda are also centered on horses. Derived from asva, its cognates are found in Indo-European languages like Sanskrit, Avestan, Latin and Greek (such as hippos and equus). There are repeated references to the horse in the Vedas (c. 1500–500 BCE). In particular, the Rigveda has many equestrian scenes, often associated with chariots. The Ashvamedha or horse sacrifice is a notable ritual of the Yajurveda.

As horses were difficult to breed in the Indian climate, they were imported in large numbers, usually from Central Asia, but also from elsewhere. Horse traders are already mentioned in Atharvaveda 2.30.29. A painting at Ajanta shows horses and elephants that are transported by ship. Trautmann (1982) thus remarked that the supply and import of horses has "always" been a preoccupation of the Indians, and "it is a structure of its history, then, that India has always been dependent upon western and central Asia for horses."

== See also ==
- Ashvamedha
- Ashvins
- Early Indians
- Domestication of the horse
- Horses in East Asian warfare

== Sources ==
Printed sources

- Bryant, Edwin (2001). The Quest for the Origins of Vedic Culture. Oxford University Press. ISBN 0-19-513777-9.
- Bryant, Edwin F.; Patton, Laurie L. (2005). The Indo-Aryan Controversy: Evidence and Inference in Indian History. Routledge.
- Coomaraswamy, Ananda (1942). "Horse Riding in the Rgveda and Atharvaveda". Journal of the American Oriental Society. 62 (2): 139–140. doi:10.2307/594467. JSTOR 594467.
- Falconer H. and Cautley, Fauna Antiqua Sivalensis, Being the Fossil Zoology of the Siwalik Highlands in the North of India, 1849, London.
- Kennedy, Kenneth A.R. (2000), God-Apes and Fossil Men: Palaeoanthropology of South Asia, Ann Arbor: University of Michigan Press
- Kennedy, Kenneth A.R. (2012), "Have Aryans been identified in the prehistorical skeletal record from South Asia? Biological anthropology and concepts of ancient races", in Erdosy, George (ed.), The Indo-Aryans of Ancient South Asia: Language, Material Culture and Ethnicity, Walter de Gruyter
- Lal, B.B. (1998). New Light on the Indus Civilization. Delhi: Aryan Books.
- Lal, B.B. (2005), The Homeland of the Aryans. Evidence of Rigvedic Flora and Fauna & Archaeology, New Delhi: Aryan Books International
- Matossian, Mary Kilbourne (2016), Shaping World History, Routledge, ISBN 978-1-315-50348-6
- Narasimhan, Vagheesh M.; Patterson, Nick J.; Moorjani, Priya; Lazaridis, Iosif; Mark, Lipson; Mallick, Swapan; Rohland, Nadin; Bernardos, Rebecca; Kim, Alexander M. (2019). "The formation of human populations in South and Central Asia". Science. 365 (6457) eaat7487. bioRxiv 10.1101/292581. doi:10.1126/science.aat7487. PMC 6822619.
- Outram, Alan K.; et al. (2009). "The Earliest Horse Harnessing and Milking". Science. 323 (5919): 1332–1335. Bibcode:2009Sci...323.1332O. doi:10.1126/science.1168594. PMID 19265018. S2CID 5126719.
- Reddy, Krishna (2006), Indian History, Tata McGraw-Hill Education
- Singh, Upinder (2009), History of Ancient and Early Medieval India: From the Stone Age to the 12th Century, Longman, ISBN 978-81-317-1677-9
- Thapar (1996), The theory of Aryan race and India, Delhi: Social Scientist
- Thapar, Romila (2006). India: Historical Beginnings and the Concept of the Aryan. National Book Trust. ISBN 978-81-237-4779-8.
- Trautmann, Thomas (2005), The Aryan Debate in India, Oxford University Press, ISBN 0-19-566908-8
- Witzel, Michael E. J. (2001). "Autochthonous Aryans? The Evidence from Old Indian and Iranian Texts" (PDF). Electronic Journal of Vedic Studies. 7 (3): 1–115.

Web-sources
