= History of Uttar Pradesh =

The history of Uttar Pradesh, a state in India, stretches back several millennia. The region shows the presence of human habitation dating back to between 85,000 and 73,000 years ago. Additionally, the region seems to have been domesticated as early as 6,000 BC.

The early modern period in the region started in 1526 after Babur invaded the Delhi Sultanate, and established the Mughal Empire covering large parts of modern Uttar Pradesh. The remnants of the Mughal Empire include their monuments, most notably Fatehpur Sikri, Allahabad Fort, Agra Fort.

The region was the site of the Indian Rebellion of 1857, with revolts at, Jhansi, Meerut, Kanpur, and Lucknow. The region was also a site for the Indian Independence movement with the Indian National Congress.

After independence in 1947, the United Provinces were renamed Uttar Pradesh in 1950.

In 2000, the state of Uttarakhand was carved out from Uttar Pradesh.

== Prehistory ==
Archeological finds have indicated the presence of Stone Age Homo sapiens hunter-gatherers in Uttar Pradesh between around 85 and 73 thousand years old. Other pre-historical finds have included Middle and Upper Paleolithic artifacts dated to 21–31 thousand years old and Mesolithic/Microlithic hunter-gatherer's settlement, near Pratapgarh, from around 10550–9550 BC. Villages with domesticated cattle, sheep, and goats and evidence of agriculture began as early as 6000 BC, and gradually developed between c. 4000 and 2000 BC beginning with the Indus Valley Civilization and Harappa culture to the Vedic period; extending into the Iron Age.

== 1000BCE–200CA ==
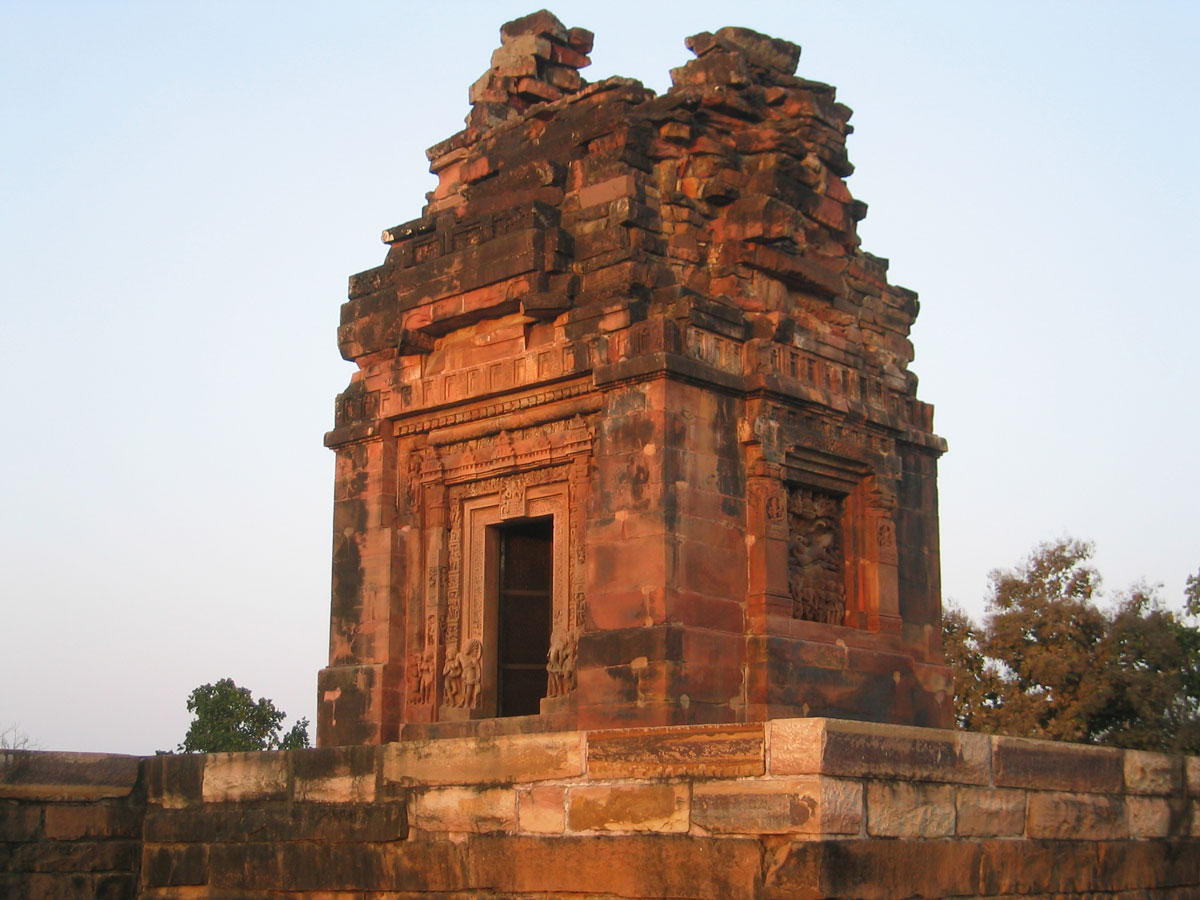
Dashavatara Temple at Deogarh was built by the Gupta Empire.

The kingdom of Kosala, in the Mahajanapada era, was located within the regional boundaries of modern-day Uttar Pradesh. The kingdom of the Kurus corresponds to the Black and Red Ware and Painted Gray Ware culture and the beginning of the Iron Age in North-west India, around 1000 BC. Out of the sixteen, mahajanapadas (lit. 'great realms') or oligarchic republics that existed in ancient India, seven fell entirely within the present-day boundaries of the state. The kingdom of Kosala, in the Mahajanapada era, was also located within the regional boundaries of modern-day Uttar Pradesh. The aftermath of the Kurukshetra War is believed to have taken place in the area between the Upper Doab and Delhi.

Control over Gangetic plains region was of vital importance to the power and stability of all of India's major empires, including the Maurya (320–200 BCE), Kushan (100–250 CE), Gupta (350–600), and Gurjara-Pratihara (650–1036) empires. Following the Huns' invasions that broke the Gupta empire, the Ganges-Yamuna Doab saw the rise of Kannauj. During the reign of Harshavardhana (590–647), the Kannauj empire reached its zenith. It spanned from Punjab in the north and Gujarat in the west to Bengal in the east and Odisha in the south. It included parts of central India, north of the Narmada River and it encompassed the entire Indo-Gangetic Plain. Many communities in various parts of India claim descent from the migrants of Kannauj.

== Gupta Era (240 CE – 579 CE) ==
=== Homeland ===
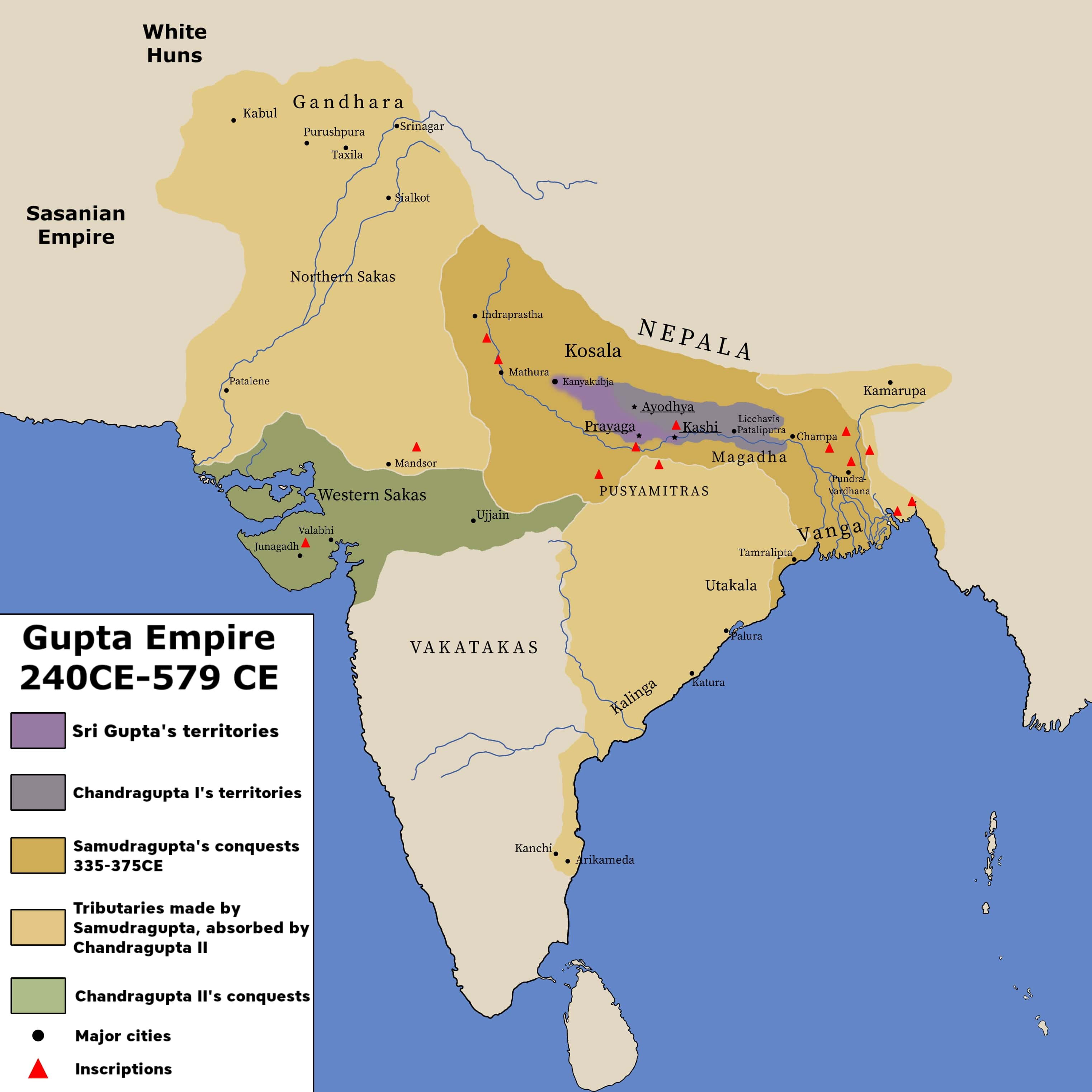
Evolution of Gupta territory, with neighbouring polities.

In some recent academic studies, the Guptas are traced to have originated from the Prayaga region, where they first established power. Goyal suggests that the Allahabad Pillar Inscription strongly indicates that the early Gupta center of power was in the modern eastern Uttar Pradesh, probably around Prayaga.

The Vishnu Purana provides an intriguing reference: "Anu-Ganga Prayāgam Māgadha Guptās-cha bhokshyanti," which has been translated by Majumdar as "The territory along the Ganges (up to) Prayaga will be enjoyed by the people of Magadha and the Guptas." This excerpt suggests that the Guptas were distinguished from the people of Magadha, yet both jointly ruled the region along the Ganges up to Prayaga.

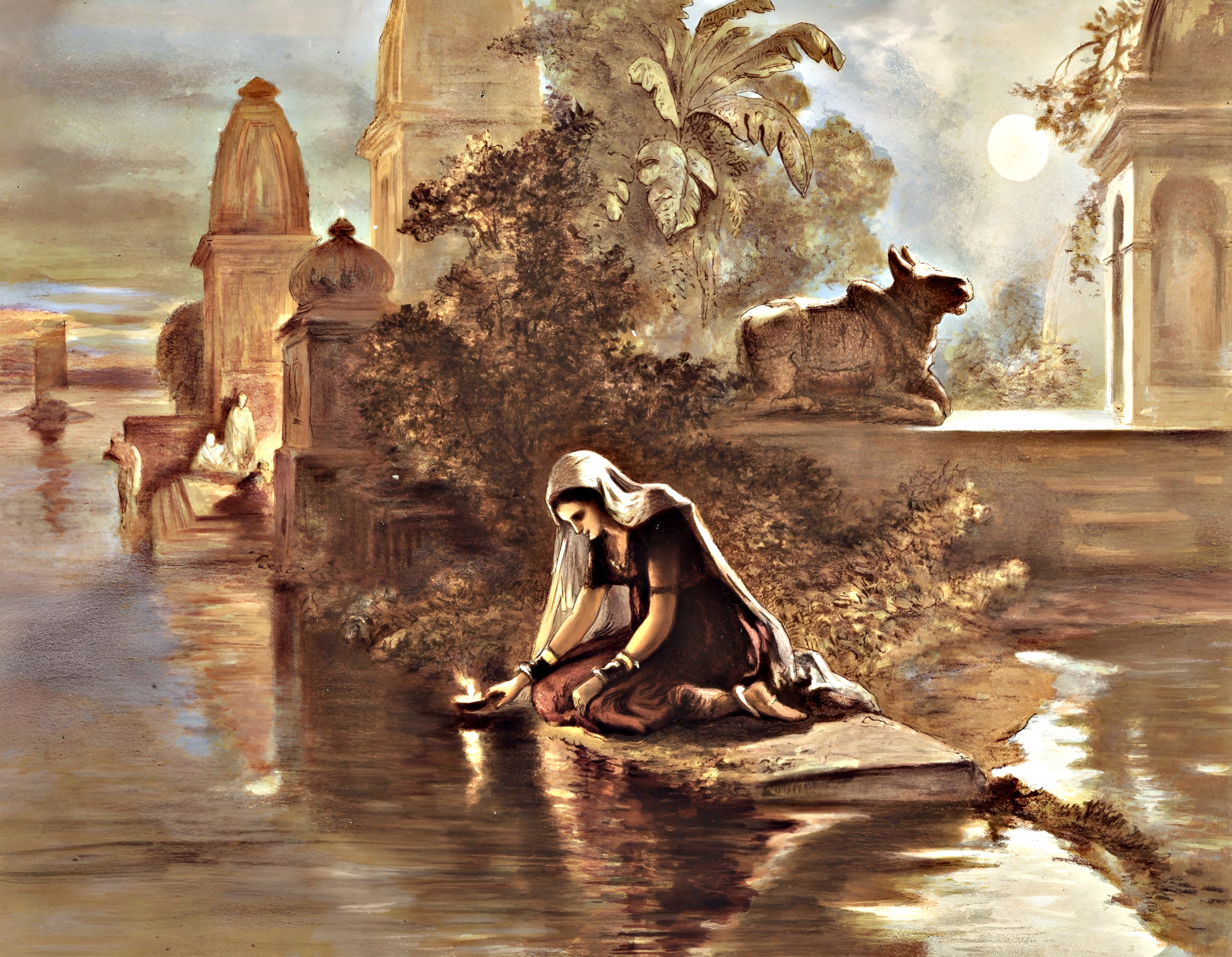
Indian woman floating lamps on the Ganges by William Simpson.

Historically, the Gupta Empire emerged from the unification of the Gupta and Licchavis states, which aligns with this Purana's reference. The text seems to imply that the Licchavis of Nepal were identified with the Magadhas, and their joint domain included Magadha and the territory stretching westward to Prayag.

In this context, the capital of the Gupta empire likely started around Magadha and Prayag and expanded from there. The concentration of early Gupta inscriptions and gold coinages around Prayag (especially of Samudragupta's famous prasasti) tends to suggest that this region was the residence of greatest power of the Guptas. They probably controlled Sarnath in the east, and as their stronghold, they used Prayag. For the initial phase of the empire, the exact boundaries in the region above and the west is vague, but they most definitely controlled eastern Uttar Pradesh. By the late third and early fourth centuries, this area had burgeoned into a dynasty aiming to build a great empire.

=== Imperial capital ===
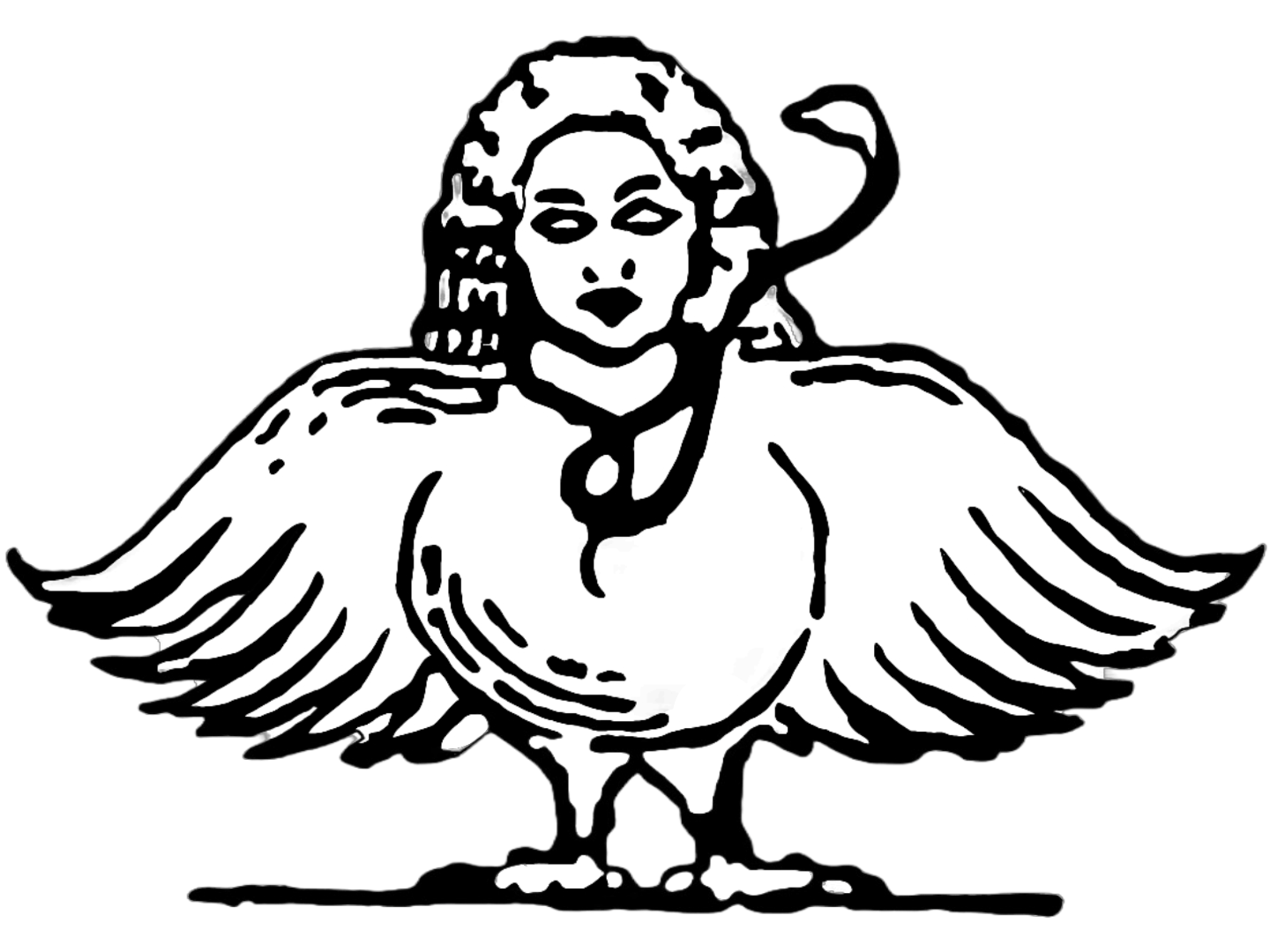
Garuda emblem of the Gupta Empire.

Various scholarships considers Prayaga as the initial Gupta capital and supports this arguments with The Puranic references, and multiple early Gupta era inscriptions alongside the discovery of numerous coin hoards scattered around the region, further suggesting that the Guptas strengthened their sovereignty over the area prior to further expansion.

This statement was also supported by R.S. Sharma who claimed that it is highly likely the Guptas based themselves in Uttar Pradesh because from there they could expand anywhere. With Prayag as their center, they extended their rule over Anuganga (mid-Gangetic basin), Prayag (modern Prayagraj), Saketa (modern Ayodhya), and Magadha.

=== Prayaga Prasasti ===
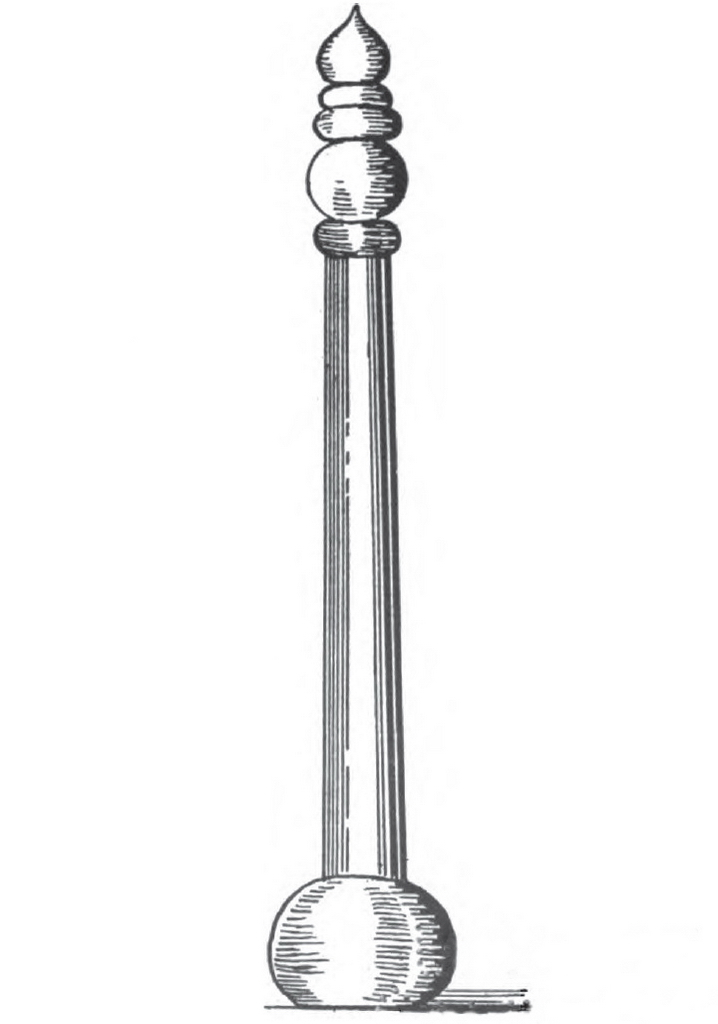
The Allahabad Pillar as seen by the missionary Joseph Tiefenthaler in the 18th century.

Samudragupta is thought to have come to the throne in the mid-4th century CE. His precise date of coronation is not known, however, evidence from both numismatics and epigraphy bear witness that he was one of the greatest rulers of ancient India. He was an excellent statesman, a gifted poet, and a musician. As noted in the Allahabad Pillar inscription, he was also a great conqueror who unified north and central India.

In the same inscription, Sri Gupta and Ghatotkacha are given the title of Mahārāja while Chandragupta I and Samudragupta are referred to as Mahārājādhirāja, reflecting the increasing power and imperial glory of the dynasty.

== Middle Kingdoms (c. 200 BCE – 1206 CE) ==
Most of the invaders of south India passed through the Gangetic plains of what is today Uttar Pradesh. Control over this region was of vital importance to the power and stability of all of India's major empires, including the Maurya (320–200 BC), Kushan (100–250 CE), Gupta (350–600 CE), and Gurjara-Pratihara (650–1036 CE) empires. Following the Huns invasions that broke the Gupta empire, the Ganges-Yamuna Doab saw the rise of Kannauj.

The Maukhari dynasty came to power with the decline of the Gupta Empire. During the reign of Harshavardhana (590–647), the Kannauj empire reached its zenith. It spanned from Punjab in the north and Gujarat in the west to Bengal in the east and Odisha in the south. It included parts of central India, north of the Narmada River and it encompassed the entire Indo-Gangetic Plain. The Pushyabhuti dynasty were followed by the Varman dynasty which achieved hegemony over North India under Yashovarman. The Ayudha dynasty succeeded them in Kannauj.

Many communities in various parts of India claim descent from the migrants of Kannauj. Soon after Harshavardhana's death, his empire disintegrated into many kingdoms, which were invaded and ruled by the Gurjara-Pratihara empire, which challenged Bengal's Pala Empire for control of the region. Kannauj was several times invaded by the south Indian Rashtrakuta Dynasty from the 8th century to the 10th century.

In the middle of the 13th century the Srinet rajput "Chandrasen", expel the Domkatar/Drontikar bhumihar from the eastern Basti.

[As per a legend; the basti area is ruled by some Rajbhars way before. (no definite evidence is found to justify it.)]

== Delhi Sultanate Era (1206–1526) ==
Parts or all of Uttar Pradesh were ruled by the Delhi Sultanate for 320 years (1206–1526). Five dynasties ruled over the Sultanate sequentially: the Mamluk dynasty (1206–90), the Khalji dynasty (1290–1320), the Tughlaq dynasty (1320–1414), the Sayyid dynasty (1414–51), and the Lodi dynasty (1451–1526).

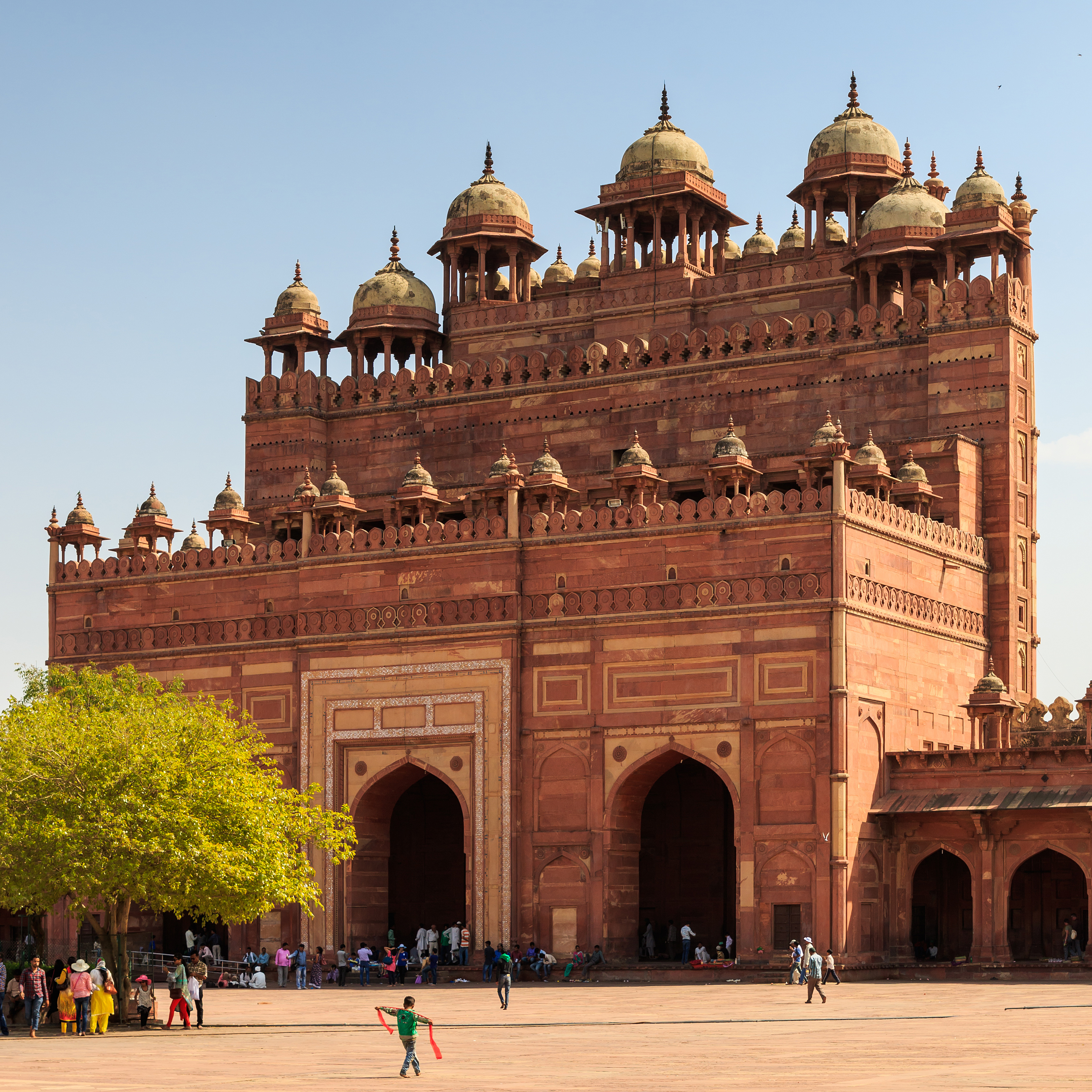
Rear of the Buland Darwaza at Fatehpur Sikri, built to commemorate Akbar's victorious conquest of Gujarat.

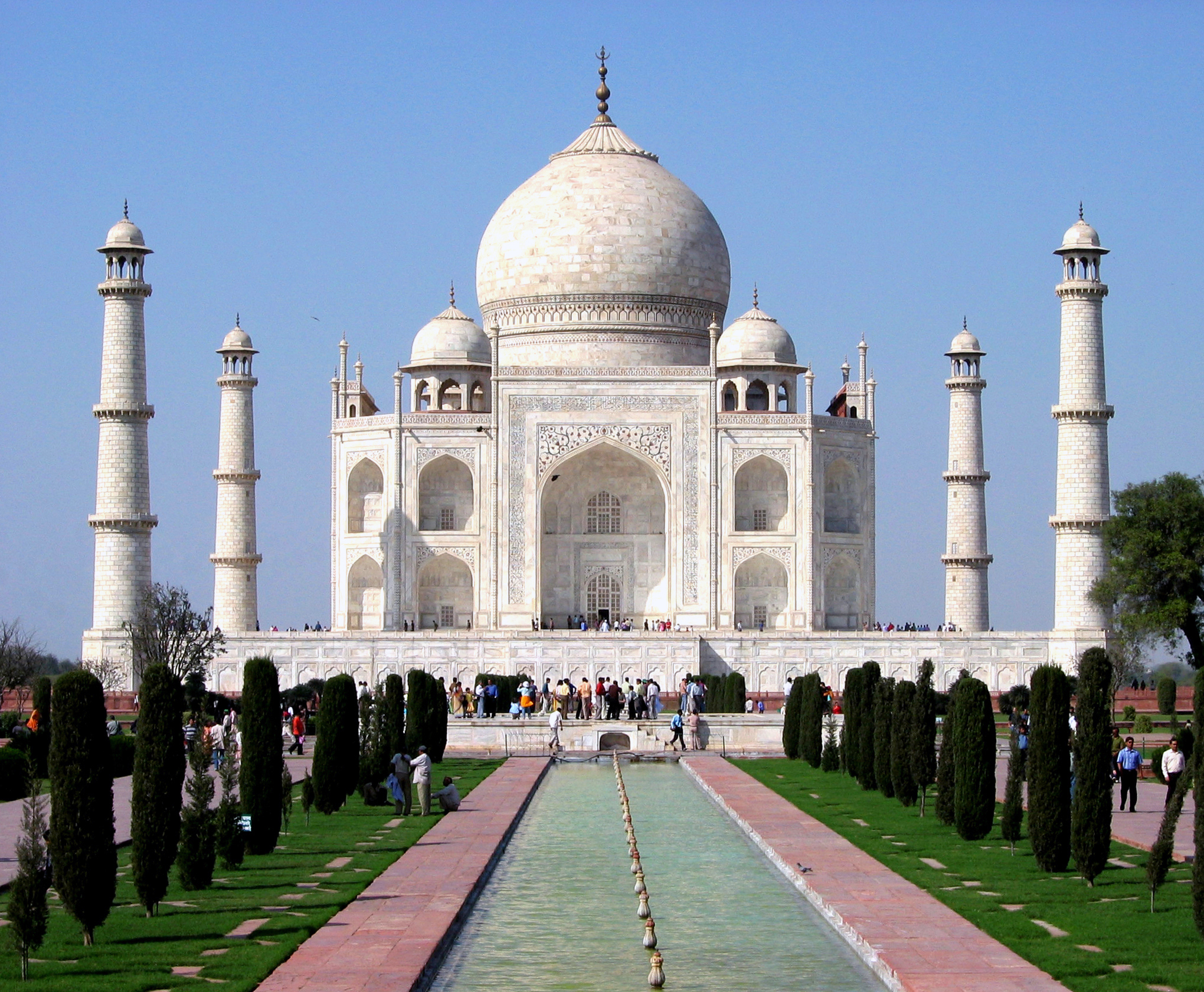
Taj Mahal in Agra, built by Mughal Emperor Shah Jahan in the 17th century.

== Mughal Era (1526 – c. 1737) ==
In the 16th century, Babur, a Timurid descendant of Timur and Genghis Khan from Fergana Valley (modern-day Uzbekistan), swept across the Khyber Pass and founded the Mughal Empire, covering India, along with modern-day Afghanistan, Pakistan and Bangladesh The Mughals were descended from Persianised Central Asian Turks (with significant Mongol admixture). In the Mughal era, Uttar Pradesh became the heartland of the empire. Mughal emperors Babur and Humayun ruled from Agra.

In 1540 an Afghan, Sher Shah Suri, took over the reins of Uttar Pradesh after defeating the Mughal king Humanyun. Sher Shah and his son Islam Shah ruled Uttar Pradesh from their capital at Gwalior. After the death of Islam Shah Suri, his prime minister Hemu became the de facto ruler of Uttar Pradesh, Bihar, Madhya Pradesh, and the western parts of Bengal. He was bestowed the title of Vikramaditya at his coronation in Purana Quila in Delhi. Hemu died in the Second Battle of Panipat, and Uttar Pradesh came under Emperor Akbar's rule.

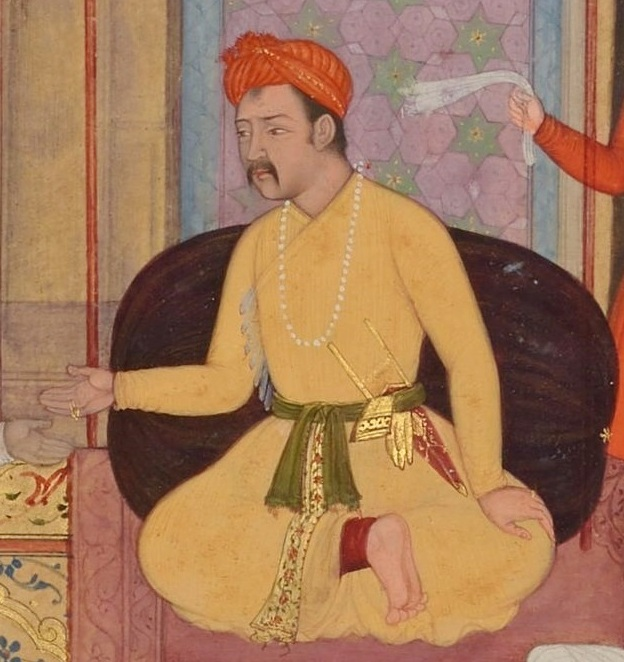
The Mughal Emperor Akbar firmly consolidated power in Uttar Pradesh during his rule

Akbar ruled from Agra and his newly established city, Fatehpur Sikri. He was succeeded by his son Jahangir. Jahangir was succeeded by his son Shah Jahan. Shah Jahan is famous for building the Taj Mahal, a mausoleum for his queen Mumtaz Mahal located in Agra. The Taj Mahal is considered one of the most significant examples of Indo-Islamic architecture. Shah Jahan was succeeded by his son Aurangzeb, who did not share the religious tolerance of his ancestors, and was infamous for the destruction of temples. In the decades that followed the death of Aurangzeb in 1707, Mughal rule in the region largely collapsed.

== Maratha Era (c. 1737 – 1803) ==
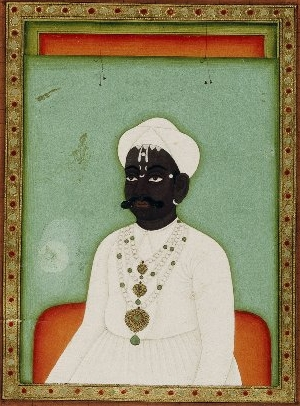
A portrait of Mahadji Shinde

After the fall of Mughal authority, the power vacuum was filled by the Maratha Empire. In the mid 18th century, the Maratha army invaded the Uttar Pradesh region, which resulted in Rohillas losing control of Rohillkhand to the Maratha rulers Raghunath Rao and Malharao Holkar. The conflict between the Rohillas and the Marathas came to an end on 18 December 1788 with the arrest of Ghulam Qadir, the grandson of Najeeb-ud-Daula. In this battle, Ghulam Qadir was defeated by the Maratha general Mahadji Shinde. In 1803, following the Second Anglo-Maratha War, when the British East India Company defeated the Maratha Empire, much of the region came under British suzerainty.

== British Era (1803–1947) ==
=== Company Rule and Indian Rebellion of 1857 ===
Timeline of reorganization & name changes of UP
- 1807: Ceded and Conquered Provinces
- 14 November 1834: Presidency of Agra
- 1 January 1836: North-Western Provinces
- 3 April 1858: Oudh taken under British control, Delhi Territory taken away from NWP and merged into Punjab
- 1 April 1871: Ajmer, Merwara & Kekri made separate commissioner-ship
- 15 February 1877: Oudh added to North-Western Provinces
- 22 March 1902: Renamed United Provinces of Agra and Oudh
- 3 January 1921: Renamed United Provinces of British India
- 1 April 1937: Renamed United Provinces
- 1 April 1946: Self rule granted
- 15 August 1947: Part of independent India
- 24 January 1950: Renamed Uttar Pradesh
- 9 November 2000: Uttaranchal state, now known as Uttarakhand, created from part of Uttar Pradesh

Starting from Bengal in the second half of the 18th century, a series of battles for north Indian lands finally gave the British East India Company accession over the state's territories. Ajmer and Jaipur kingdoms were also included in this northern territory, which was named the "North-Western Provinces" (of Agra). Although UP later became the fifth largest state of India, NWPA was one of the smallest states of the British Indian empire. Its capital shifted twice between Agra and Allahabad.

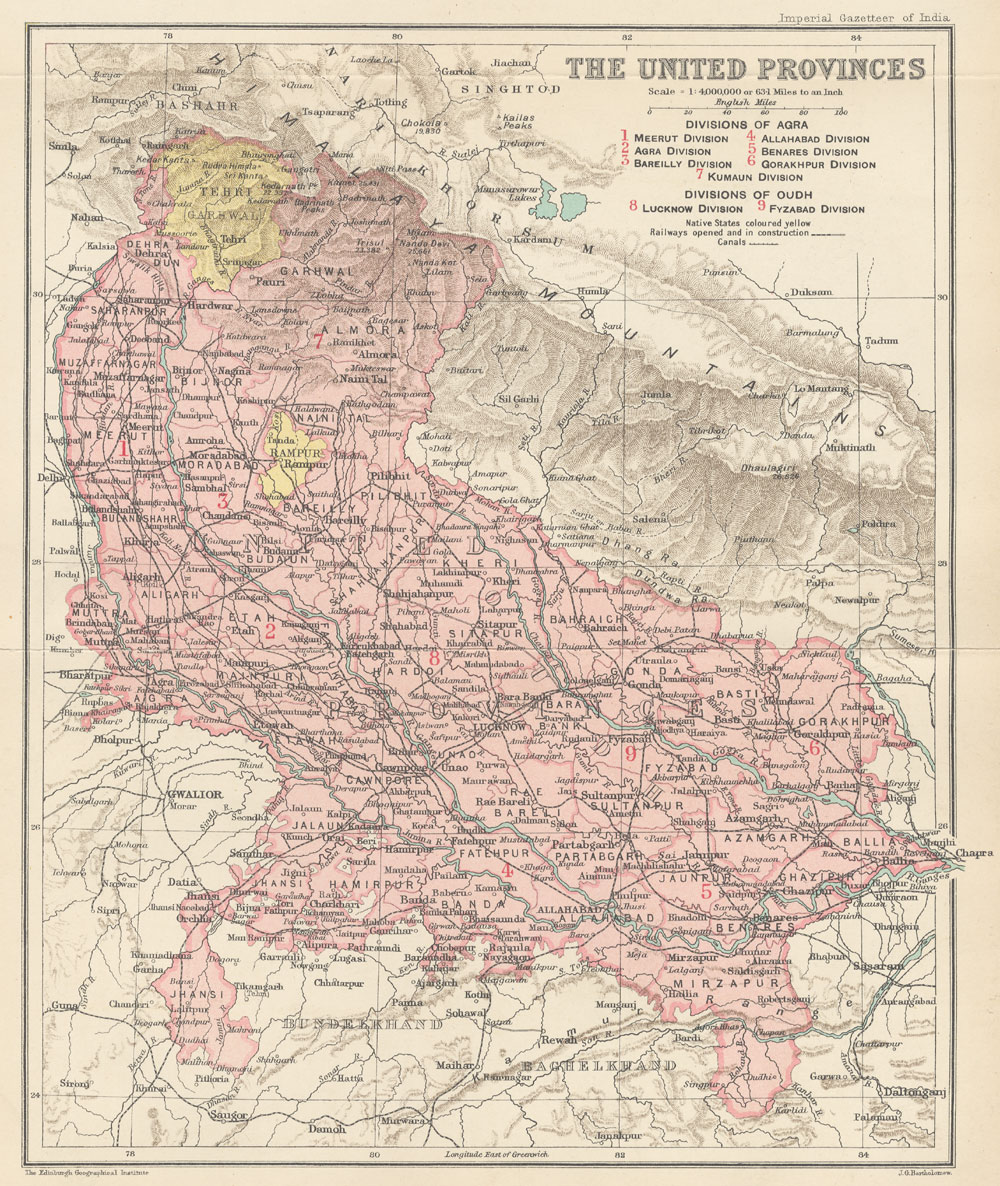
United Provinces in 1909

Due to dissatisfaction with British rule, a serious rebellion erupted in various parts of North India; Bengal regiment's sepoy stationed at Meerut cantonment, Mangal Pandey, is widely credited as its starting point. It came to be known as the Indian Rebellion of 1857.

=== Direct British rule (1858–1947) ===
After the revolt failed, the British attempted to divide the most rebellious regions by reorganizing the administrative boundaries of the region, splitting the Delhi region from 'NWFP of Agra' and merging it with Punjab, while the Ajmer- Marwar region was merged with Rajputana and Oudh was incorporated into the state. The new state was called the 'North Western Provinces of Agra and Oudh', which in 1902 was renamed as the United Provinces of Agra and Oudh. It was commonly referred to as the United Provinces or its acronym UP.

In 1920, the capital of the province was shifted from Allahabad to Lucknow. The high court continued to be at Allahabad, but a bench was established at Lucknow. Allahabad continues to be an important administrative base of today's Uttar Pradesh and has several administrative headquarters. Uttar Pradesh continued to be central to Indian politics and was especially important in modern Indian history as a hotbed of the Indian independence movement. Uttar Pradesh hosted modern educational institutions such as the Benaras Hindu University, Aligarh Muslim University and the Darul Uloom Deoband. Nationally known figures such as Chandra Shekhar Azad were among the leaders of the movement in Uttar Pradesh, and Motilal Nehru, Jawaharlal Nehru, Madan Mohan Malaviya and Gobind Ballabh Pant were important national leaders of the Indian National Congress. The All India Kisan Sabha (AIKS) was formed at the Lucknow session of the Congress on 11 April 1936, with the famous nationalist Swami Sahajanand Saraswati elected as its first President, in order to address the longstanding grievances of the peasantry and mobilise them against the zamindari landlords attacks on their occupancy rights, thus sparking the Farmers movements in India. During the Quit India Movement of 1942, Ballia district overthrew the colonial authority and installed an independent administration under Chittu Pandey. Ballia became known as "Baghi Ballia" (Rebel Ballia) for this significant role in India's independence movement.

== Post-Independence (1947 – present) ==
=== 1950 – 2000 ===
After India's independence, the United Provinces were reorganized as Uttar Pradesh in 1950. The state has provided seven of India's prime ministers and is the source of the largest number of seats in the Lok Sabha. Despite its political influence, its poor economic development and administrative record, organised crime and corruption kept it amongst India's backward states. The state has been affected by repeated episodes of caste and communal violence.

There were incidents of communal violence in 1980 and 1987. 1992, a large group of Hindu activists demolished the 16th-century Babri Mosque in the city of Ayodhya, which is claimed to be the site of Ram Janmabhoomi. The Ayodhya dispute triggered massive protests across the state as well as nationally and internationally.

=== 2000 – present ===
In 2000, northern districts of the state were separated to form the state of Uttarakhand. In February 2017, Yogi Adityanath became the chief minister of Uttar Pradesh. In 2019, Ayodhya Dispute was settled by The Supreme Court of India. The ground-breaking ceremony of the Rama Janmabhoomi temple took place on 5 August 2020.

Uttar Pradesh has improved its performance considerably in the recent times witnessing lowest crime rate in 2020.

The state has also made strides on various economic parameters in the recent times, doubling its GSDP to Rs 21.73 lakh crore (2020–21) in four years from Rs 10.90 lakh crore in 2015–16. Under its Chief Minister Yogi Adityanath, the state also became the second most favourable destination in the country for doing business.

== See also ==
- Indus Valley Tradition
- Painted Grey Ware
- Vedic science

== Bibliography ==
For Paleolithic & Neolithic period:

- Kennedy, Kenneth Adrian Raine (2000). God-Apes and Fossil Men: Palaeoanthropology of South Asia. Ann Arbor: University of Michigan Press.
- James, Hannah V. A.; Petraglia, Michael D. (December 2005). "Modern Human Origins and the Evolution of Behavior in the Later Pleistocene Record of South Asia" (PDF). Current Anthropology. 46 (Supplement): S3. Bibcode:2005CurrA..46S...3J. doi:10.1086/444365. hdl:11858/00-001M-0000-002B-0DBC-F. S2CID 12529822. Archived from the original (PDF) on 19 August 2006.
- Misra, V. N. (November 2001). "Prehistoric human colonization of India" (PDF). Journal of Biosciences. 26 (4): 491–531. Bibcode:2001JBios..26..491M. doi:10.1007/BF02704749. PMID 11779962. S2CID 26248907.

For Copper Hoard culture:

- Sharma, Deo Prakash, 2002. Newly Discovered Copper Hoard, Weapons of South Asia (C. 2800–1500 BC), Delhi, Bharatiya Kala Prakashan,182 p.
- Yule, P. 1985. Metalwork of the Bronze Age in India. C.H. Beck, Munich ISBN 3-406-30440-0
- Yule, P./Hauptmann, A./Hughes, M. 1989 [1992]. The Copper Hoards of the Indian Subcontinent: Preliminaries for an Interpretation, Jahrbuch des Römisch-Germanischen Zentralmuseums Mainz 36, 193–275, ISSN 0076-2741
- Gupta, S.P. (ed.). 1995. The lost Sarasvati and the Indus Civilization. Kusumanjali Prakashan, Jodhpur.

For Painted Grey Ware culture:

- Bryant, Edwin (2001). The Quest for the Origins of Vedic culture. Oxford University Press. ISBN 0-19-513777-9.
- Chakrabarti, D.K. 1968. The Aryan hypothesis in Indian archaeology. Indian Studies Past and Present 4, 333–358.
- Jim Shaffer. 1984. The Indo-Aryan Invasions: Cultural Myth and Archaeological Reality. In: J.R. Lukak. The People of South Asia. New York: Plenum. 1984.
- Kennedy, Kenneth 1995. "Have Aryans been identified in the prehistoric skeletal record from South Asia?", in George Erdosy, ed.: The Indo-Aryans of Ancient South Asia, pp. 49–54.

For Cemetery H culture:

- Kenoyer, Jonathan Mark (1991). "Urban Process in the Indus Tradition: A preliminary model from Harappa". In Meadow, R. H. (ed.). Harappa Excavations 1986–1990: A multidiscipinary approach to Third Millennium urbanism. Madison, WI: Prehistory Press. pp. 29–60.
- http://www.harappa.com
- https://web.archive.org/web/20060908052731/http://pubweb.cc.u-tokai.ac.jp/indus/english/3_1_01.html

For Vedic Period:

- Basham, A. L. (2008), The Wonder That Was India: A survey of the history and culture of the Indian sub-continent before the coming of the Muslims, Scholarly Publishing Office, University of Michigan, ISBN 978-1-59740-599-7
- Kulke, Hermann; Rothermund, Dietmar (1998), A History of India, Routledge, ISBN 978-0-415-32920-0
- Singh, Upinder (2008), A History of Ancient and Early Medieval India: From the Stone Age to the 12th Century, Pearson Education India, ISBN 978-81-317-1120-0
- Guruge, Ananda W. P. (1991), The Society of Rāmāyaṇa, Abhinav Publications, ISBN 978-81-7017-265-9

For Indo-Schynthians

- Harmatta, János, ed., 1994. History of civilizations of Central Asia, Volume II. The development of sedentary and nomadic civilizations: 700 BC to AD 250. Paris, UNESCO Publishing.
- Hill, John E. 2004. The Western Regions according to the Hou Hanshu. Draft annotated English translation.
  "The Han Histories". Depts.washington.edu.
- Hill, John E. 2004. The Peoples of the West from the Weilue 魏略 by Yu Huan 魚豢: A Third Century Chinese Account Composed between 239 and 265 AD. Draft annotated English translation.
  "Weilue: The Peoples of the West". Depts.washington.edu. 23 May 2004.
- Liu, Xinru (2001). "Migration and Settlement of the Yuezhi-Kushan: Interaction and Interdependence of Nomadic and Sedentary Societies". Journal of World History. 12 (2): 261–292. doi:10.1353/jwh.2001.0034. JSTOR 20078910. S2CID 162211306. Gale A77434151 Project MUSE 18413 ProQuest 225238862.
- Watson, Burton. Trans. 1961. Records of the Grand Historian of China: Translated from the Shih chi of Ssu-ma Ch'ien. Chapter 123: The Account of Ta-yüan, p. 265. Columbia University Press. ISBN 0-231-08167-7

For Kushans:

- Avari, Burjor (2007). India: The Ancient Past. London: Routledge. ISBN 978-0-415-35616-9.
- Bopearachchi, Osmund (2003). De l'Indus à l'Oxus, Archéologie de l'Asie Centrale (in French). Lattes: Association imago-musée de Lattes. ISBN 2-9516679-2-2.
- Faccenna, Domenico (1980). Butkara I (Swāt, Pakistan) 1956–1962, Volume III 1 (in English). Rome: IsMEO (Istituto Italiano Per Il Medio Ed Estremo Oriente).
- Falk, Harry. 1995–1996. Silk Road Art and Archaeology IV.
- Falk, Harry. 2001. "The yuga of Sphujiddhvaja and the era of the Kuṣāṇas." Silk Road Art and Archaeology VII, pp. 121–136.
- Falk, Harry. 2004. "The Kaniṣka era in Gupta records." Harry Falk. Silk Road Art and Archaeology X, pp. 167–176.
- Goyal, S. R. "Ancient Indian Inscriptions" Kusumanjali Book World, Jodhpur (India), 2005.
- Hill, John E. 2004. The Western Regions according to the Hou Hanshu. Draft annotated English translation.
  "The Han Histories". Depts.washington.edu.
- Hill, John E. 2004. The Peoples of the West from the Weilue 魏略 by Yu Huan 魚豢: A Third Century Chinese Account Composed between 239 and 265 AD. Draft annotated English translation.
  "Weilue: The Peoples of the West". Depts.washington.edu. 23 May 2004.
- Keay, John (2000). India: A History. New York: Grove Press. ISBN 0-8021-3797-0.
- Lebedynsky, Iaroslav (2006). Les Saces. Paris: Editions Errance. ISBN 2-87772-337-2.
- Rosenfield, John M. (1993). The Dynastic Art of the Kushans. New Delhi: Munshiram Manoharlal. ISBN 81-215-0579-8.
- Sivaramamurti, C. (1976). Śatarudrīya: Vibhūti of Śiva's Iconography. Delhi: Abhinav Publications.
