= Ganga Mahal Ghat =

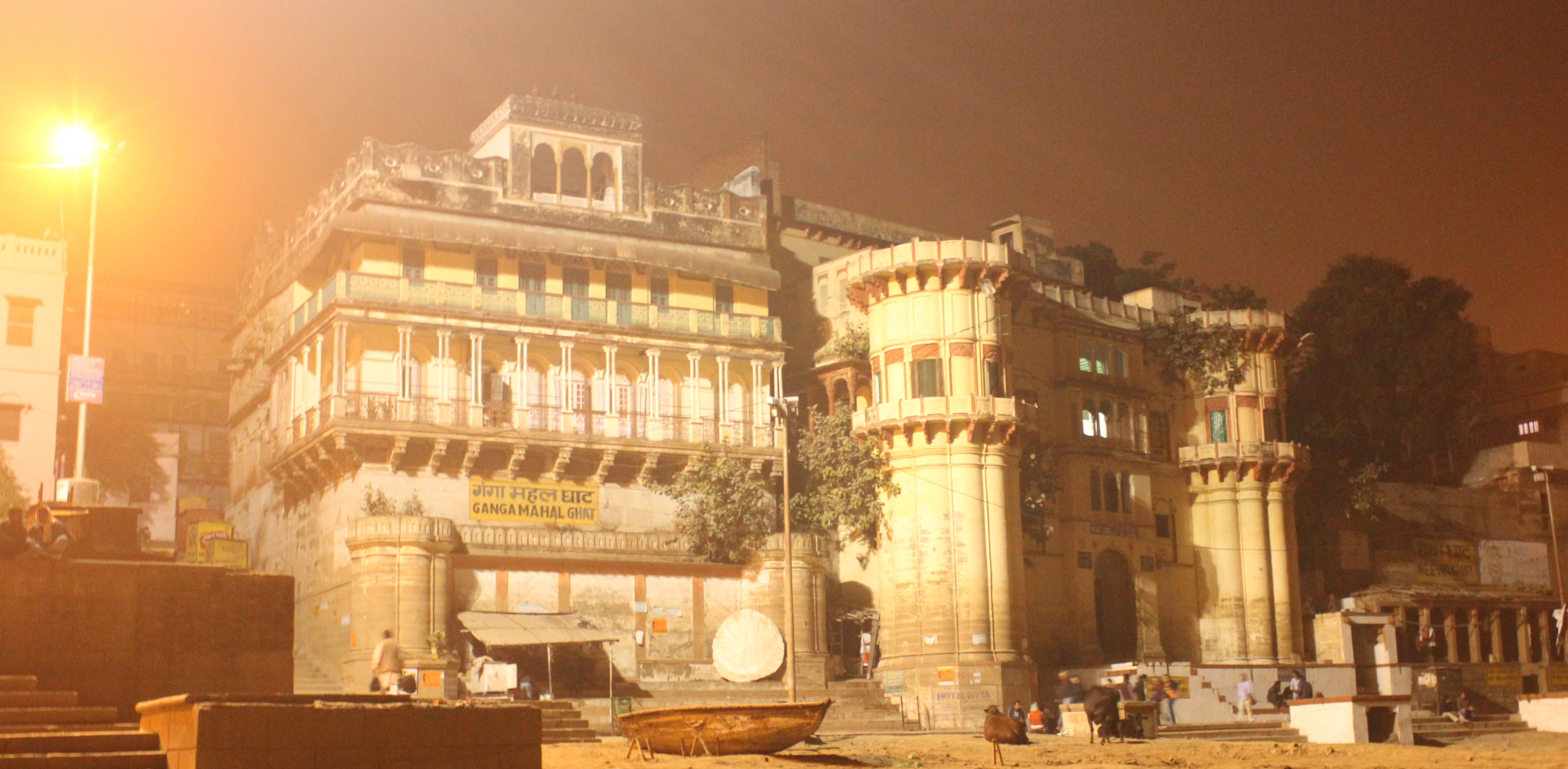
- Ganga Mahal Ghat front view

- Location within Varanasi district
- 25.289675°N 83.006362°E
- Location: Varanasi

History
- Founder: Narayan dynasty
- Built: 1830
- Built for: To house palace for Benares State

Site notes
- Elevation: 72.35 m (237.4 ft)
- Architectural style: Uttar Pradesh style
- Governing body: Varanasi Nagar Nigam
- Owner: Maharani Trust of Benares State

Ganga Mahal Ghat is a ghat on the Ganges River in Varanasi, India. Constructed in 1830 by the Narayan dynasty, the ghat is north of Assi Ghat and was originally constructed as an extension to Assi Ghat.

== History ==
The Narayan dynasty, in 1830, constructed a palace by the Ganga in Varanasi. The palace was called "Ganga Mahal" (Mahal means palace in Hindi). Since the palace was located on the ghat, the ghat came to be known as "Ganga Mahal Ghat". Stone steps between Assi Ghat and Ganga Mahal Ghat separate the two ghats. This palace houses the design studio of Hemang Agrawal whereas the upper floors are used by the "Indo-Swedish Study Centre" organised by Karlstad University.

== See also ==
- Ghats in Varanasi
