= Climate of Uttar Pradesh =

The climate of Uttar Pradesh is a tropical monsoon climate, consisting mainly of a humid subtropical climate with dry winter (Cwa). Parts of western Uttar Pradesh consist of a hot semi-arid climate (BSh). The uniformity of the vast Indo-Gangetic Plain covering most of the state causes it to have a predominantly single climate pattern with minor regional variations.

With temperatures fluctuating from 0 °C or 32 °F to 50 °C or 122 °F in several parts of the state and unpredictable rains, the summers are extremely hot, the winters are cold, and the rainy season can be either very wet or very dry.

== Classification ==
Köppen climate classification map of India

The climate of Uttar Pradesh is generally defined to be tropical monsoon. However, based on the Köppen climate classification, it can be classified mostly as humid subtropical with dry winter (Cwa) type with parts of western Uttar Pradesh as semi-arid hot (BSh).

Given significant climate differences, Uttar Pradesh has been divided into two meteorological sub-divisions, East Uttar Pradesh and West Uttar Pradesh.

== Seasons ==
According to the Indian Meteorological Department, Uttar Pradesh has three predominant seasons.

The retreating monsoon season, although present generally in India, has a very negligible effect in Uttar Pradesh and only occasional mild showers are experienced in winter. Additionally, some of these showers are due to western disturbances, not the monsoon.

=== Summer ===
Summer lasts from March to May. It is hot and dry, and temperatures rise to 45 °C or 113 °F, sometimes 47 or 48 °C or 116.6 or 118.4 °F. The relative humidity is low, at around 20 per cent, and the winds are laden with dust.

=== Monsoon ===
The monsoon season lasts from June to October. It accounts for 85 per cent of the average annual rainfall. During rainy days, the temperature falls.

=== Winter ===
Winter lasts from November to February. Morning temperatures drop to 3–4 °C or 37.4–39.2 °F, and sometimes drop below −1 °C or 30.2 °F. The skies are clear, and some regions experience foggy conditions.

== Geography ==
Uttar Pradesh is in the heart of the Indo-Gangetic Plain with the Ganges river flowing right through the state, the Himalayas to the north, and the Chota Nagpur Plateau and the Vindhya Range to the south of the state.

== Temperature ==
Temperature varies from 0 to 46 °C (32.0 to 114.8 °F). High temperatures of around 50 °C or 122 °F have been recorded in Gonda district. Such a wide range of temperature fluctuations in most parts of the state can lead to either cold waves or heat waves both resulting in substantial loss of life and economy.

=== Heat waves ===
In 2007, a heat wave struck Uttar Pradesh, with Banda district with 45.5 °C or 113.9 °F the hottest in the state for several days. At least 62 people were reportedly dead during the heat wave that year.

In June 2009, 30 people died of heatstroke. Record high temperatures reached 49 °C or 120.2 °F in the Bundelkhand region of southern Uttar Pradesh.

In June 2010, Jhansi recorded the highest temperature of 46.7 °C or 116.1 °F, the hottest in that year.

=== Cold waves ===
In recent years, the 2007–2008 winter caused a string of cold-related deaths with temperatures as low as 2.8 °C or 37.0 °F in the city of Meerut. Simultaneously, it also led to a loss of crops and agricultural products.

Similarly, the last part of 2009 saw the temperature falling to lows of 2.9 °C or 37.2 °F in Meerut, again causing deaths.

The 2010–2011 winter caused more cold-wave-related deaths. This time, Churk, Sonbhadra district, ranked coldest with 1.4 °C or 34.5 °F.

On 13 January 2013, Kanpur recorded its all-time low temperature when the temperature plunged to −1.1 °C or 30.0 °F and on the same day, Agra recorded −0.7 °C or 30.7 °F.

In January, in Lucknow, the temperature can plunge below freezing; Lucknow recorded 0.0 °C or 32.0 °F on 18 January 2017. Agra and Muzaffarnagar are also notorious for chilly winds and the temperature there can also go below freezing.

== Precipitation ==
It rains over most of Uttar Pradesh, with very few arid or semi-arid patches. Snowfall does not occur, but hailstorms, frost, and dew often do. The type of rainfall that Uttar Pradesh receives is orographic, cyclonic, and convectional.

=== Rain ===
Primarily a summer phenomenon, the Bay of Bengal branch of the Indian Monsoon is the major bearer of rain in most parts of Uttar Pradesh. It is the south-west monsoon which brings most of the rain, although rain due to western disturbances and the north-east monsoon also contribute small quantities towards the overall rain in the state. The rain can vary from an annual average of 170 cm in hilly areas to less than 80 cm in the west. Given that most of this rainfall is concentrated in the four months of the monsoon season, excess rain can lead to floods and a shortage to droughts. As such, floods and droughts are a common occurrence.

=== Floods ===
Floods are a known hazard of Uttar Pradesh due to overflowing of its main rivers like Ganges, Yamuna, Ramganga, Gomti, Sharda, Ghaghra, Rapti, and Gandak. The estimated annual loss due to floods is ₹4.32 billion (US$46 million). Major flood management efforts have been undertaken to mitigate the risk. Most of these floods occur due to the monsoon rains and the resulting overflow of rivers. One such year occurred in 2010.

=== Droughts ===
Shortages of rain during the highly variable monsoon season can cause droughts, leading to deaths and property loss. Recent 2002 and 2004 drought-related loss estimates have been reported to be ₹75.4 billion (US$810 million) and ₹72.92 billion (US$780 million), respectively.

The recurrence of a major deficiency in annual rainfall follows a six to eight-year cycle in East Uttar Pradesh, whereas in West Uttar Pradesh, it is a ten-year cycle.

== Wind ==
In summer, hot winds called loo blow across Uttar Pradesh. They are dust-laden and quite damaging. In winter, dry and rainless winds blow across the state. Fog may also form in parts of Uttar Pradesh.

== Climate data ==
Climate data for Agra (1991–2020, extremes 1901–2002)
| Month | Jan | Feb | Mar | Apr | May | Jun | Jul | Aug | Sep | Oct | Nov | Dec | Year |
|---|---|---|---|---|---|---|---|---|---|---|---|---|---|
| Record high °C (°F) | 33.0 (91.4) | 35.6 (96.1) | 42.8 (109.0) | 47.3 (117.1) | 48.6 (119.5) | 48.5 (119.3) | 46.5 (115.7) | 43.0 (109.4) | 41.4 (106.5) | 41.1 (106.0) | 36.5 (97.7) | 31.0 (87.8) | 48.6 (119.5) |
| Mean daily maximum °C (°F) | 22.2 (72.0) | 26.2 (79.2) | 32.1 (89.8) | 38.4 (101.1) | 41.9 (107.4) | 41.1 (106.0) | 36.0 (96.8) | 33.1 (91.6) | 34.2 (93.6) | 34.7 (94.5) | 29.2 (84.6) | 23.7 (74.7) | 32.7 (90.9) |
| Mean daily minimum °C (°F) | 7.4 (45.3) | 10.4 (50.7) | 14.2 (57.6) | 20.0 (68.0) | 24.4 (75.9) | 25.5 (77.9) | 24.7 (76.5) | 23.9 (75.0) | 23.5 (74.3) | 18.7 (65.7) | 13.2 (55.8) | 8.1 (46.6) | 17.9 (64.2) |
| Record low °C (°F) | −2.2 (28.0) | −1.7 (28.9) | 5.5 (41.9) | 10.0 (50.0) | 14.0 (57.2) | 12.0 (53.6) | 14.5 (58.1) | 12.0 (53.6) | 13.0 (55.4) | 9.4 (48.9) | 2.8 (37.0) | −0.6 (30.9) | −2.2 (28.0) |
| Average rainfall mm (inches) | 12.5 (0.49) | 10.8 (0.43) | 8.3 (0.33) | 8.5 (0.33) | 21.4 (0.84) | 46.4 (1.83) | 245.8 (9.68) | 198.6 (7.82) | 110.8 (4.36) | 24.7 (0.97) | 2.5 (0.10) | 3.2 (0.13) | 693.6 (27.31) |
| Average rainy days | 1.2 | 0.8 | 1.2 | 0.9 | 1.8 | 3.2 | 10.3 | 10.1 | 5.8 | 1.2 | 0.2 | 0.5 | 37.2 |
| Average relative humidity (%) (at 17:30 IST) | 63 | 52 | 44 | 40 | 39 | 45 | 69 | 78 | 69 | 53 | 63 | 65 | 57 |
| Average dew point °C (°F) | 8 (46) | 11 (52) | 13 (55) | 14 (57) | 17 (63) | 21 (70) | 25 (77) | 25 (77) | 23 (73) | 18 (64) | 13 (55) | 10 (50) | 17 (62) |
| Average ultraviolet index | 5 | 6 | 7 | 9 | 9 | 9 | 7 | 7 | 8 | 7 | 6 | 4 | 7 |
Source 1: India Meteorological DepartmentTime and Date (dewpoints, 2005-2015)
Source 2: NOAA (1971–1990),Weather Atlas

Climate data for Lucknow (1981–2010, extremes 1952–2012)
| Month | Jan | Feb | Mar | Apr | May | Jun | Jul | Aug | Sep | Oct | Nov | Dec | Year |
|---|---|---|---|---|---|---|---|---|---|---|---|---|---|
| Record high °C (°F) | 30.4 (86.7) | 35.9 (96.6) | 40.9 (105.6) | 45.0 (113.0) | 46.5 (115.7) | 47.7 (117.9) | 44.2 (111.6) | 40.4 (104.7) | 40.1 (104.2) | 37.7 (99.9) | 38.0 (100.4) | 29.9 (85.8) | 47.7 (117.9) |
| Mean maximum °C (°F) | 27.2 (81.0) | 31.1 (88.0) | 37.6 (99.7) | 42.2 (108.0) | 44.0 (111.2) | 43.5 (110.3) | 38.7 (101.7) | 36.5 (97.7) | 36.5 (97.7) | 35.6 (96.1) | 32.2 (90.0) | 28.1 (82.6) | 44.6 (112.3) |
| Mean daily maximum °C (°F) | 22.1 (71.8) | 26.2 (79.2) | 32.3 (90.1) | 38.2 (100.8) | 39.6 (103.3) | 38.3 (100.9) | 34.1 (93.4) | 33.5 (92.3) | 33.3 (91.9) | 32.8 (91.0) | 29.1 (84.4) | 24.4 (75.9) | 32.0 (89.6) |
| Mean daily minimum °C (°F) | 7.9 (46.2) | 10.7 (51.3) | 15.2 (59.4) | 20.7 (69.3) | 24.7 (76.5) | 26.6 (79.9) | 26.1 (79.0) | 25.7 (78.3) | 24.3 (75.7) | 19.4 (66.9) | 13.2 (55.8) | 9.1 (48.4) | 18.6 (65.5) |
| Mean minimum °C (°F) | 3.8 (38.8) | 6.5 (43.7) | 10.3 (50.5) | 15.5 (59.9) | 20.3 (68.5) | 22.6 (72.7) | 23.6 (74.5) | 23.4 (74.1) | 21.6 (70.9) | 14.7 (58.5) | 9.1 (48.4) | 5.2 (41.4) | 3.6 (38.5) |
| Record low °C (°F) | −1.0 (30.2) | 0.0 (32.0) | 5.4 (41.7) | 10.9 (51.6) | 17.0 (62.6) | 19.7 (67.5) | 21.5 (70.7) | 22.2 (72.0) | 17.2 (63.0) | 15.0 (59.0) | 3.9 (39.0) | 0.5 (32.9) | −1.0 (30.2) |
| Average rainfall mm (inches) | 16.7 (0.66) | 16.1 (0.63) | 8.6 (0.34) | 5.6 (0.22) | 24.4 (0.96) | 107.8 (4.24) | 255.3 (10.05) | 213.7 (8.41) | 205.6 (8.09) | 44.8 (1.76) | 6.4 (0.25) | 12.3 (0.48) | 917.3 (36.09) |
| Average rainy days | 1.3 | 1.4 | 0.9 | 0.6 | 2.0 | 5.2 | 11.8 | 10.6 | 8.4 | 1.7 | 0.6 | 0.8 | 45.3 |
| Average relative humidity (%) (at 17:30 IST) | 60 | 47 | 33 | 25 | 32 | 49 | 73 | 77 | 74 | 65 | 61 | 62 | 55 |
| Average dew point °C (°F) | 9 (48) | 12 (54) | 13 (55) | 14 (57) | 19 (66) | 23 (73) | 26 (79) | 26 (79) | 25 (77) | 19 (66) | 14 (57) | 10 (50) | 18 (63) |
| Average ultraviolet index | 5 | 7 | 9 | 11 | 12 | 12 | 12 | 12 | 10 | 8 | 6 | 5 | 9 |
Source 1: India Meteorological Department Time and Date (dewpoints, 2005-2015)
Source 2: Weather Atlas

Climate data for Kanpur (1981-2010, extremes 1901-2006)
| Month | Jan | Feb | Mar | Apr | May | Jun | Jul | Aug | Sep | Oct | Nov | Dec | Year |
|---|---|---|---|---|---|---|---|---|---|---|---|---|---|
| Record high °C (°F) | 31.1 (88.0) | 35.6 (96.1) | 42.8 (109.0) | 45.6 (114.1) | 47.2 (117.0) | 47.3 (117.1) | 45.0 (113.0) | 40.6 (105.1) | 40.0 (104.0) | 40.6 (105.1) | 36.1 (97.0) | 31.3 (88.3) | 47.3 (117.1) |
| Mean daily maximum °C (°F) | 22.3 (72.1) | 25.4 (77.7) | 32.0 (89.6) | 38.0 (100.4) | 39.8 (103.6) | 39.0 (102.2) | 33.8 (92.8) | 33.2 (91.8) | 33.1 (91.6) | 32.5 (90.5) | 28.6 (83.5) | 24.4 (75.9) | 31.9 (89.4) |
| Mean daily minimum °C (°F) | 8.2 (46.8) | 10.6 (51.1) | 15.6 (60.1) | 21.1 (70.0) | 25.1 (77.2) | 27.2 (81.0) | 26.4 (79.5) | 26.1 (79.0) | 24.8 (76.6) | 19.0 (66.2) | 12.8 (55.0) | 8.7 (47.7) | 18.8 (65.8) |
| Record low °C (°F) | 1.6 (34.9) | 0.6 (33.1) | 7.2 (45.0) | 11.1 (52.0) | 16.4 (61.5) | 20.6 (69.1) | 21.7 (71.1) | 21.7 (71.1) | 11.8 (53.2) | 4.6 (40.3) | 0.5 (32.9) | −0.9 (30.4) | −0.9 (30.4) |
| Average rainfall mm (inches) | 9.2 (0.36) | 9.2 (0.36) | 2.9 (0.11) | 2.7 (0.11) | 8.2 (0.32) | 61.8 (2.43) | 185.3 (7.30) | 191.7 (7.55) | 138.1 (5.44) | 33.9 (1.33) | 3.4 (0.13) | 2.1 (0.08) | 648.5 (25.52) |
| Average rainy days | 0.8 | 0.8 | 0.4 | 0.3 | 0.8 | 2.9 | 9.6 | 9.0 | 6.1 | 1.4 | 0.3 | 0.2 | 32.6 |
| Average relative humidity (%) (at 17:30 IST) | 59 | 46 | 34 | 27 | 31 | 45 | 74 | 77 | 72 | 62 | 62 | 62 | 54 |
Source: India Meteorological Department

Climate data for Meerut (1971–2000)
| Month | Jan | Feb | Mar | Apr | May | Jun | Jul | Aug | Sep | Oct | Nov | Dec | Year |
|---|---|---|---|---|---|---|---|---|---|---|---|---|---|
| Record high °C (°F) | 29.3 (84.7) | 32.2 (90.0) | 39.5 (103.1) | 43.5 (110.3) | 45.8 (114.4) | 46.1 (115.0) | 46.0 (114.8) | 40.0 (104.0) | 39.0 (102.2) | 38.0 (100.4) | 34.5 (94.1) | 30.0 (86.0) | 46.1 (115.0) |
| Mean daily maximum °C (°F) | 21.9 (71.4) | 23.1 (73.6) | 28.7 (83.7) | 36.3 (97.3) | 39.1 (102.4) | 37.6 (99.7) | 33.6 (92.5) | 32.6 (90.7) | 33.7 (92.7) | 32.8 (91.0) | 28.6 (83.5) | 23.5 (74.3) | 31.1 (88.0) |
| Mean daily minimum °C (°F) | 7.2 (45.0) | 9.1 (48.4) | 13.8 (56.8) | 19.9 (67.8) | 24.3 (75.7) | 26.0 (78.8) | 25.9 (78.6) | 25.5 (77.9) | 23.6 (74.5) | 18.2 (64.8) | 12.4 (54.3) | 8.0 (46.4) | 17.7 (63.9) |
| Record low °C (°F) | −0.4 (31.3) | 0.1 (32.2) | 5.4 (41.7) | 8.3 (46.9) | 15.4 (59.7) | 17.7 (63.9) | 16.5 (61.7) | 19.0 (66.2) | 15.7 (60.3) | 7.2 (45.0) | 1.8 (35.2) | 0.2 (32.4) | −0.4 (31.3) |
| Average precipitation mm (inches) | 19.7 (0.78) | 24.9 (0.98) | 24.4 (0.96) | 12.8 (0.50) | 19.1 (0.75) | 71.2 (2.80) | 269.0 (10.59) | 264.7 (10.42) | 95.4 (3.76) | 25.9 (1.02) | 4.3 (0.17) | 13.4 (0.53) | 845.0 (33.27) |
| Average rainy days | 1.5 | 1.7 | 1.7 | 0.9 | 1.6 | 3.9 | 10.2 | 9.4 | 4.2 | 1.6 | 0.4 | 0.9 | 38.0 |
| Average relative humidity (%) | 88 | 83 | 75 | 54 | 58 | 68 | 81 | 84 | 83 | 78 | 79 | 86 | 76 |
Source: India Meteorological Department (record high and low up to 2012)

Climate data for Varanasi (1981–2010, extremes 1901–2012)
| Month | Jan | Feb | Mar | Apr | May | Jun | Jul | Aug | Sep | Oct | Nov | Dec | Year |
|---|---|---|---|---|---|---|---|---|---|---|---|---|---|
| Record high °C (°F) | 31.4 (88.5) | 36.1 (97.0) | 41.5 (106.7) | 45.2 (113.4) | 47.2 (117.0) | 47.2 (117.0) | 45.0 (113.0) | 40.1 (104.2) | 39.7 (103.5) | 39.4 (102.9) | 36.0 (96.8) | 32.8 (91.0) | 47.2 (117.0) |
| Mean daily maximum °C (°F) | 22.5 (72.5) | 26.5 (79.7) | 32.7 (90.9) | 38.8 (101.8) | 40.1 (104.2) | 38.3 (100.9) | 33.8 (92.8) | 33.0 (91.4) | 32.9 (91.2) | 32.4 (90.3) | 29.3 (84.7) | 24.7 (76.5) | 32.1 (89.8) |
| Mean daily minimum °C (°F) | 8.9 (48.0) | 11.7 (53.1) | 16.3 (61.3) | 21.6 (70.9) | 25.3 (77.5) | 27.1 (80.8) | 25.9 (78.6) | 25.6 (78.1) | 24.6 (76.3) | 20.3 (68.5) | 14.0 (57.2) | 9.8 (49.6) | 19.3 (66.7) |
| Record low °C (°F) | 1.0 (33.8) | 1.7 (35.1) | 6.7 (44.1) | 11.1 (52.0) | 17.3 (63.1) | 20.5 (68.9) | 20.0 (68.0) | 20.4 (68.7) | 17.8 (64.0) | 11.7 (53.1) | 5.0 (41.0) | 2.2 (36.0) | 1.0 (33.8) |
| Average rainfall mm (inches) | 16.7 (0.66) | 22.8 (0.90) | 9.2 (0.36) | 5.7 (0.22) | 16.8 (0.66) | 106.8 (4.20) | 260.9 (10.27) | 280.8 (11.06) | 228.9 (9.01) | 29.0 (1.14) | 7.2 (0.28) | 4.2 (0.17) | 989.0 (38.94) |
| Average rainy days | 1.5 | 1.8 | 0.7 | 0.7 | 1.7 | 5.2 | 12.9 | 12.5 | 9.1 | 1.9 | 0.4 | 0.4 | 48.7 |
| Average relative humidity (%) (at 17:30 IST) | 63 | 50 | 35 | 25 | 31 | 50 | 74 | 78 | 77 | 68 | 66 | 66 | 57 |
| Mean monthly sunshine hours | 232.5 | 240.1 | 291.4 | 294.0 | 300.7 | 234.0 | 142.6 | 189.1 | 195.0 | 257.3 | 261.0 | 210.8 | 2,848.5 |
| Mean daily sunshine hours | 7.5 | 8.5 | 9.4 | 9.8 | 9.7 | 7.8 | 4.6 | 6.1 | 6.5 | 8.3 | 8.7 | 6.8 | 7.8 |
| Average ultraviolet index | 6 | 7 | 10 | 11 | 12 | 12 | 12 | 12 | 11 | 8 | 6 | 5 | 9 |
Source 1: India Meteorological Department (sun 1971–2000)
Source 2: Weather Atlas

== See also ==
- Geography of Uttar Pradesh
- Uttar Pradesh
- Climate of India
