= Languages of Uttar Pradesh =

- Official: Hindi, Urdu
- Regional: Awadhi; Bhojpuri; Braj; Bundeli; Bagheli; Kauravi

Uttar Pradesh is a multilingual state with 3 predominant languages and 26 other languages spoken in the state. The languages of Uttar Pradesh primarily belong to two zones in the Indo-Aryan languages, Central and East.

After the state's official language Hindi (and co-official Urdu which is mutually intelligible), the Bhojpuri language is the second most spoken language with 25.5 million speakers or 11% of the state's population. Other languages spoken are Kauravi, Awadhi, Braj, Bundeli, Bagheli and Kannauji. However, the exact speaker numbers for the languages are not known because the more educated prefer to speak in Hindi (in formal situations) and so return this answer on the census, while many in rural areas and the urban poor, especially the illiterate, list their language as "Hindi" on the census as they regard that as the term for their language, though incorrect.

== Inventories ==
Language data of Uttar Pradesh from 2011 census.
1. Hindi (80.2%)
2. Bhojpuri (10.9%)
3. Urdu (5.42%)
4. Awadhi (1.90%)
5. Others (1.59%)

Linguists generally distinguish the terms "language" and "dialects" on the basis of 'mutual comprehension'. The Indian census uses two specific classifications in a distinctive way: (1) 'language' and (2) 'mother tongue'. The 'mother tongues' are grouped within each 'language'. Many 'mother tongues' so defined would be considered a language rather than a dialect by linguistic standards. This is specifically the case for many 'mother tongues' with tens of millions of speakers that are officially grouped under the 'language' Hindi.

== Official languages ==
The languages of state administration are Hindi, established by the Uttar Pradesh Official Language Act, 1951, and Urdu, established by the Amendment to the same in 1989.

== Other languages ==
=== Awadhi ===
It is a major language spoken in the Awadh region of Uttar Pradesh.

=== Bagheli ===
It is spoken in Southeast corner of the state encompassing Banda, Chitrakoot and Southern parts of Prayagraj districts.

=== Bhojpuri ===
Bhojpuri is an Indo-Aryan language predominantly spoken in the Bhojpur-Purvanchal region located in the eastern part of Uttar Pradesh. It is widely spoken in several districts of Uttar Pradesh, including Varanasi, Gorakhpur, Ballia, Deoria, Kushinagar, Sant Kabir Nagar, Maharajganj, Chandauli, Mau, Siddharthnagar, Ghazipur, Sonbhadra, Jaunpur, Basti, Mirzapur, Ambedkar Nagar and Azamgarh.

=== Braj Bhasha ===
Spoken in Braj region and being related with Hindu deity Shri Krishna.

=== Bundeli ===
Spoken in Bundelkhand region of the state.

=== Kannauji ===
Spoken in Kannauj region.

=== Kauravi ===
Spoken in West parts of the bordering with Haryana and Delhi.

== Writing systems ==
Devanagari is the main script used to write Uttar Pradesh languages, although Urdu is written in the Nastaliq style of the Perso-Arabic script. Kaithi was widely used historically.

The Nagari Pracharini Sabha was formed in 1893 to promote the usage of the Devanagari script.

== See also ==
- Languages of India
