= List of museums in Uttar Pradesh =

The list of museums in Indian state of Uttar Pradesh.

== List ==
Name	City/Town	Year Established
State Museum, Lucknow	Lucknow	1863
Allahabad Museum	Allahabad	1931
Kanpur Sangrahalaya	Kanpur	1999
Government Museum, Mathura	Mathura	1874
Sarnath Museum	Sarnath	1910
Rashtriya Dalit Prerna Sthal and Green Garden	Noida	
Swaraj Bhavan (old Anand Bhavan)	Allahabad	

== Gallery ==
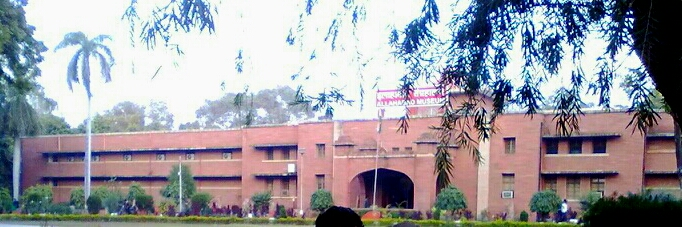
Allahabad Museum

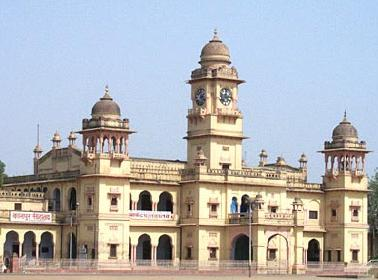
Kanpur Museum
