= Emblem of Uttar Pradesh =

Indian state government emblem

- Armiger: The Government of Uttar Pradesh
- Adopted: 1918
- Shield: A pall wavy, in chief a bow-and-arrow and in base two fishes
- Motto: Government of Uttar Pradesh
- Use: On state government documents, buildings and stationery

The Emblem of Uttar Pradesh is the official seal of the government of the Indian state of Uttar Pradesh. The emblem was originally designed in 1916 for the then United Provinces of Agra and Oudh and continued in use following Indian Independence in 1947.

== History ==
In the second half of the 18th century the autonomous princes clashed with the English East India Company, expanding from Calcutta into the valley of the Ganges. One after the other had to recognize the sovereignty of the Company. In 1816 Awadh (Oudh) had to accept a British protectorate. In 1835 all of the territory of modern Uttar Pradesh came, as “North-Western Provinces”, under British rule. In 1856 the last nawab of Awadh was deposed and his empire placed under direct British rule. In 1902 the North-Western Provinces were renamed “United Provinces of Agra and Oudh”. In 1935 the name was changed into “United Provinces” and after independence into Uttar Pradesh. With the last change the enclave-states of Benares, Rampur and Tehri Garhwal were incorporated and in the south parts of Samthar and Charkari, princely states formerly belonging to the Central Provinces. The state emblem probably dates from the time when it was known as United Provinces.

The state emblem of Uttar Pradesh owes its origin to the Royal Society in the United Kingdom, which approved the symbol in 1916. The 'Coat of Arms' adorning all UP government files, letterheads and vehicles and other government stationery, including its publications using it as seal, has an underlined idea. Unveiling this quite an unknown idea first suggested by Mr Baker, assistant director of UP state archives, Dr Sandhya Nagar, says the combination of a "pair of fish and the arrow-bow, embellished with three waves stresses on 'Unity in diversity'. Dr Nagar said the symbolism attached with each of these characters marked their presence in the logo, the pair of fish with the Muslim rulers of Oudh while the bow and arrow identifying Hindu Lord Ram while the waves marked the confluence of the rivers Ganga-Yamuna. The proposed logo also contained a star at the bottom, which was deleted later. "The symbol is a vivid representation of geographical, historical and cultural integrity of Uttar Pradesh," Dr Nagar said.

== Design ==
The emblem consists of a seal depicting the confluence of the Ganga Ganges and Yamuna rivers at Prayagraj, a pair of Matsya, mythical Avatar creature from Hindu mythology to represent the State of Oudh (Awadh) and a pair of Bow and Arrow representing Lord Rama and his city of Ayodhya, the ancient and cultural capital of the region . The legend around the seal translates as "Government of Uttar Pradesh".

== Government banner ==
The Government of Uttar Pradesh can be represented by a banner displaying the emblem of the state on a white field.

Banner of Uttar Pradesh

== Historic emblems ==
Emblem of the United Provinces of Agra and Oudh

=== Former princely states in Uttar Pradesh ===
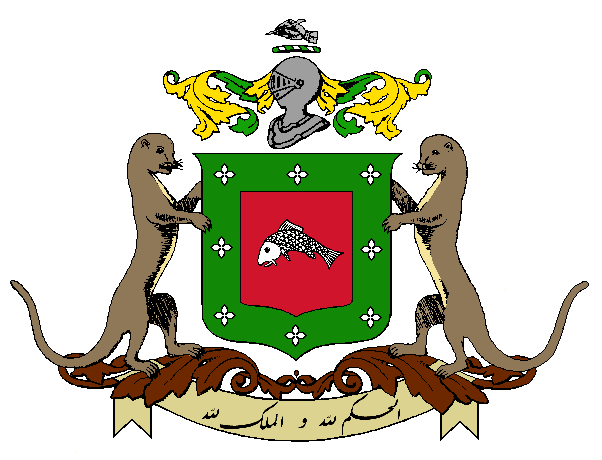
Baoni State

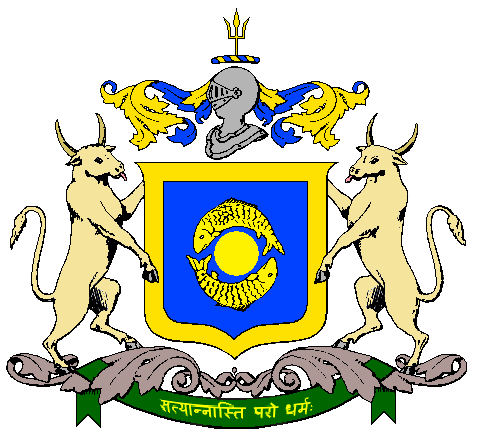
Benares State

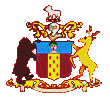
Charkhari State

Oudh State

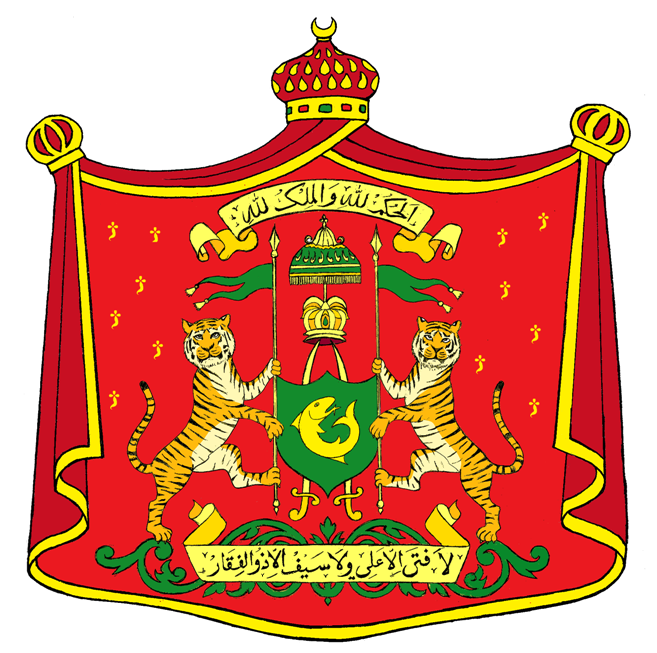
Rampur State

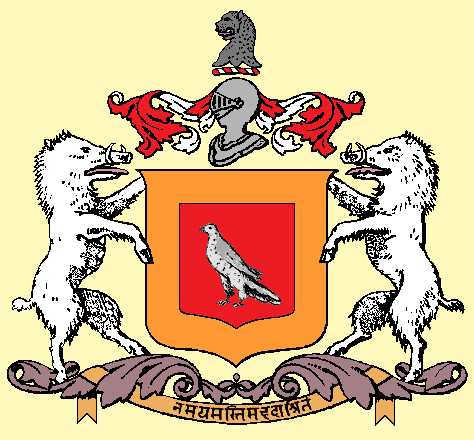
Sailana State

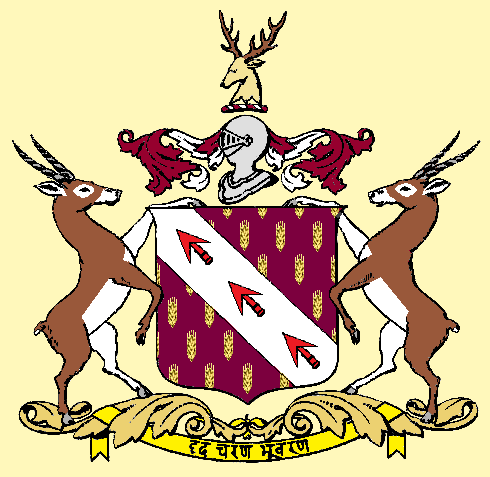
Samthar State

== See also ==
- National Emblem of India
- List of Indian state emblems
