= Architecture of Uttar Pradesh =

UNESCO World Heritage Site

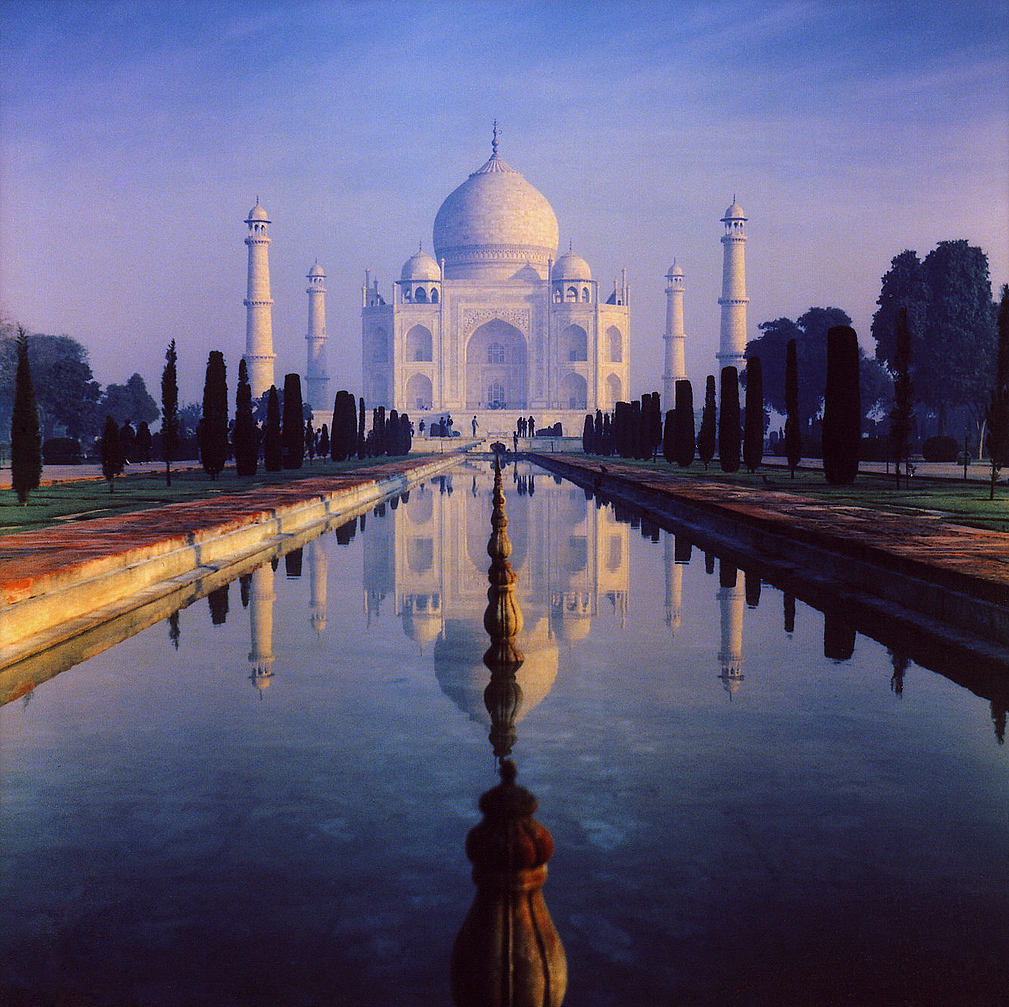
The Taj Mahal

The architecture of Uttar Pradesh includes three architectural monuments (the Taj Mahal, the Agra Fort, as well as the township of Fatehpur Sikri founded by the Mughal emperor Akbar) designated UNESCO World Heritage Sites.

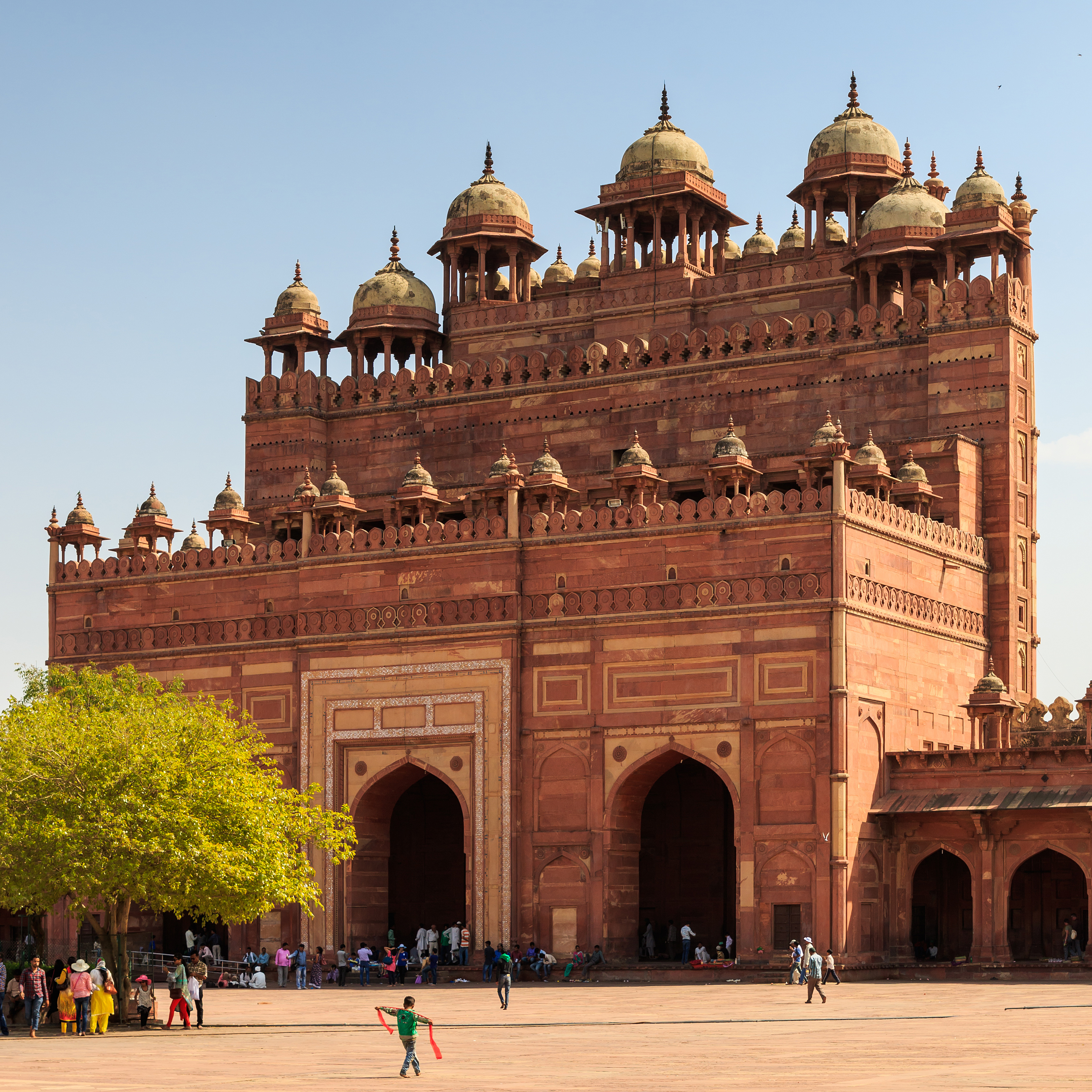
Rear of Buland Darwaza, Fatehpur Sikri.

Uttar Pradesh has three World Heritage Sites: Taj Mahal, Agra Fort and the nearby Fatehpur Sikri. Allahabad Fort stands on the banks of the Yamuna near the confluence with the river Ganges. It is the largest fort built by Akbar.

== Taj Mahal ==
The Taj Mahal in Agra, built between 1632 and 1643 during the reign of Mughal Emperor Shah Jahan is considered to be one of the best examples of Mughal architecture, as well as Indo-Islamic architecture as a whole.

== Other notable buildings ==
Lucknow, the capital of the state, has several historical monuments including Bara Imambara and Chhota Imambara.

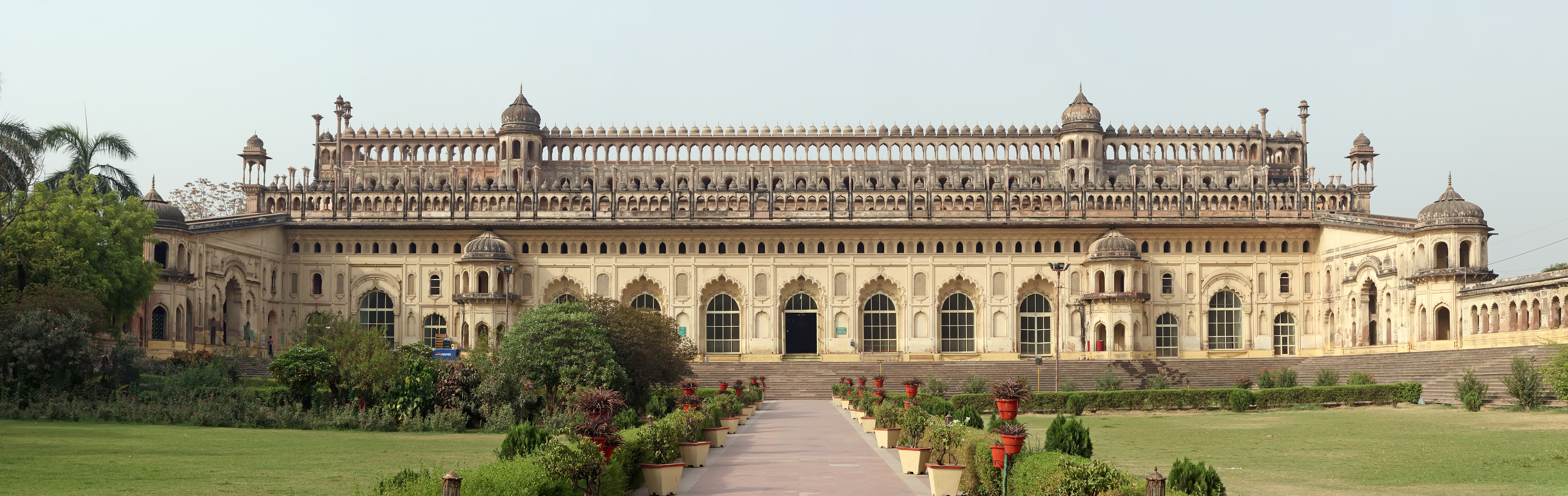
Bara Imambara facade, Lucknow India

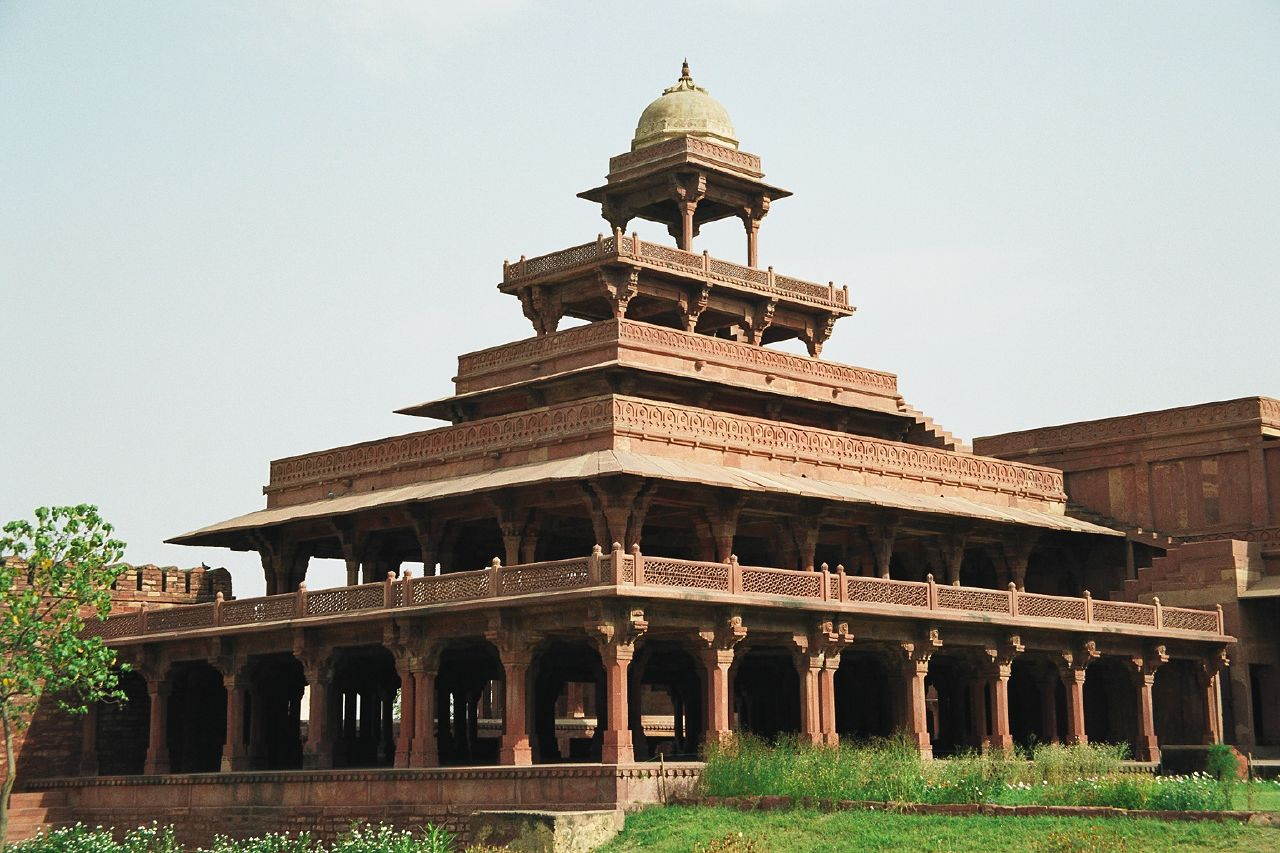
Panch Mahal, Fatehpur Sikri.

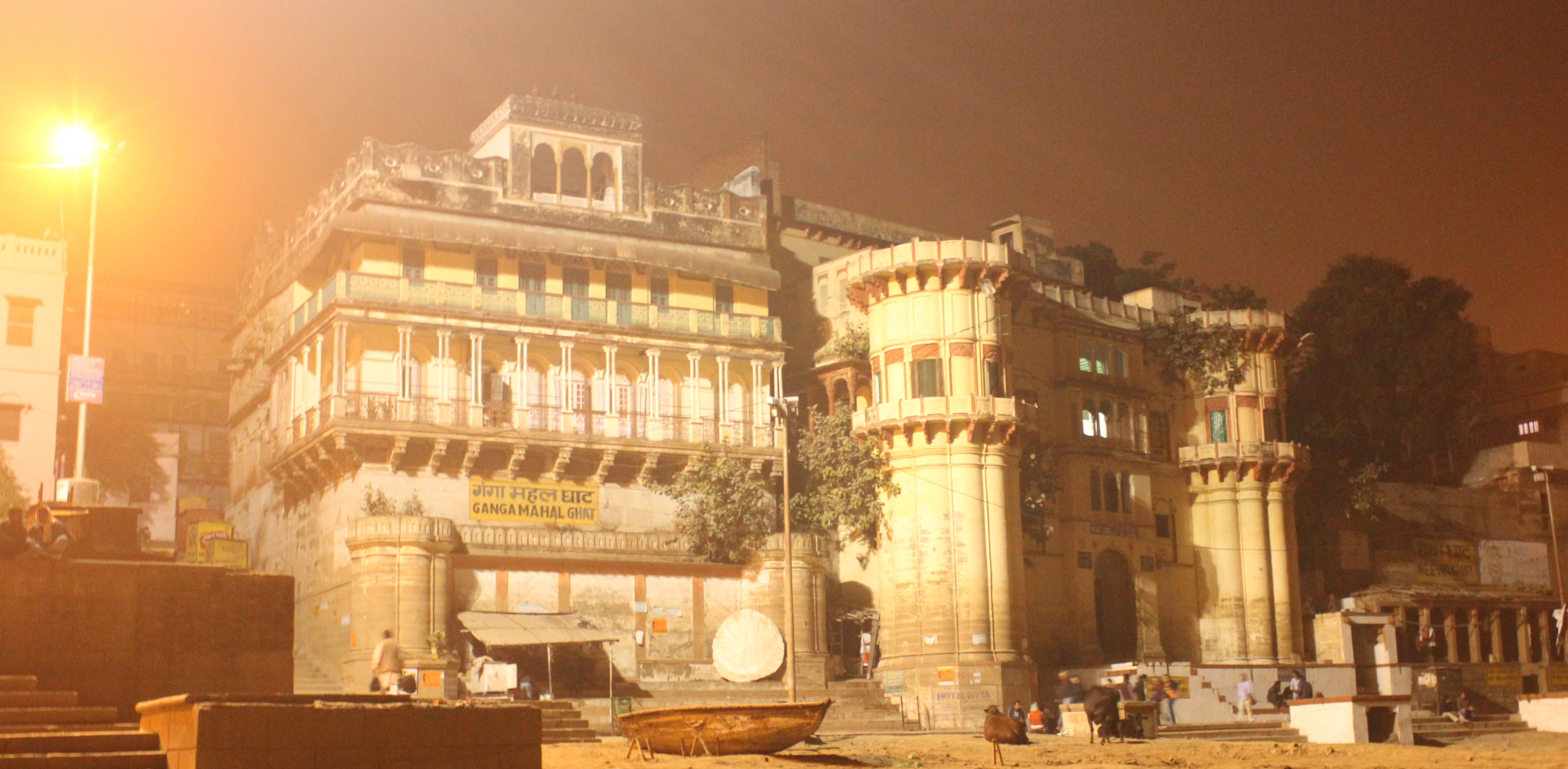
Ganga Mahal Ghat (I) in Varanasi

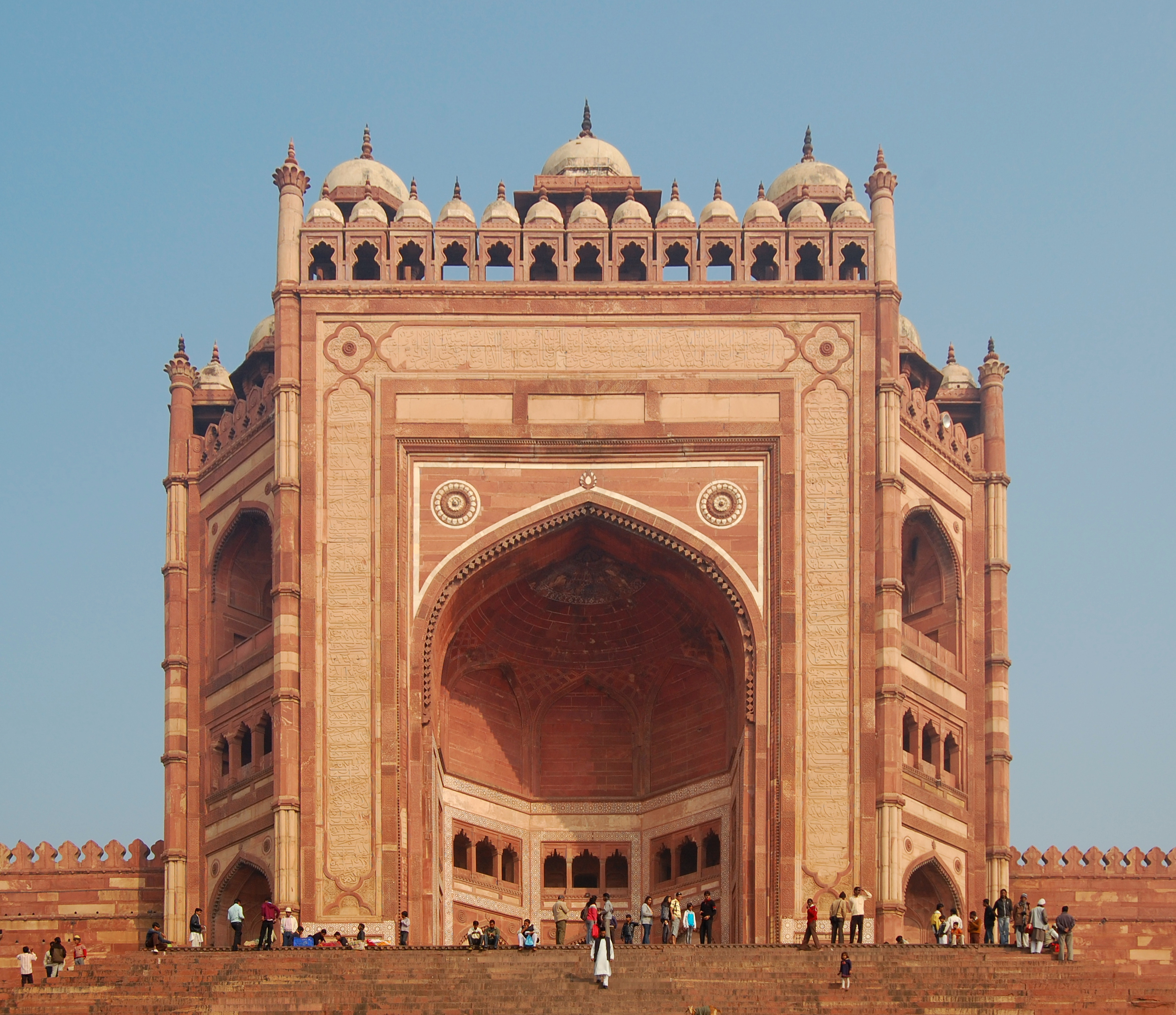
Buland Darwaza at Fatehpur Sikri
