= Geography of Uttar Pradesh =

A relief map of Uttar Pradesh

Uttar Pradesh is India's fourth largest state by land area along with India's most populous state. It is located in the north-central part of the country. Much of the state is flat, low-lying plains suitable for rice farming. The only hills are in the southern border and northern border, the foothills of the Himalayas. The climate of this state can also vary widely - primarily due to it being far from the moderating effect of the sea, the occasional cold air arising due to western disturbances., and the Himalayas in the north trapping air flow.

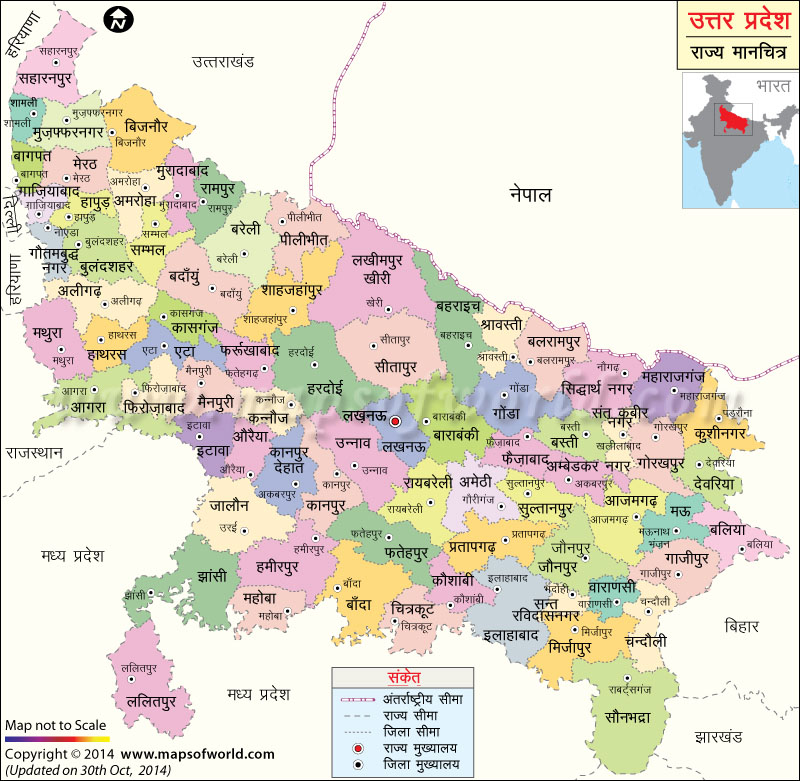
A map of Uttar Pradesh

== Location ==
Uttar Pradesh is bounded by Uttarakhand and Himachal Pradesh on the north-west, Haryana and Delhi on the west, Rajasthan on the south-west, Madhya Pradesh on the south, Chhattisgarh and Jharkhand on south-east and Bihar on the east. Situated between 23°52'N and 31°28'N latitudes and 77°3'E and 84°39'E longitudes, this is the fourth largest state in the country in terms of area, and the first in terms of population. Uttar Pradesh can be divided into four distinct hypsographical regions :

1. The Shivalik foothills
2. Terai in the North
3. The Gangetic Plain in the centre - Highly fertile alluvial soils; flat topography broken by numerous ponds, lakes, and rivers; slope 2 m/km
4. The Vindhya Hills and plateau in the south - Hard rock Strata; varied topography of mountains, hills, plains, valleys, and plateau; limited water availability.
5. The Shivalik Range which forms the southern foothills of the Himalayas, slopes down into a boulder bed called Bhabar.

The transitional belt running along the entire length of the state is called the Terai and Bhabar area. It has rich forests, cutting across it are innumerable streams that swell into raging torrents during the monsoon. The Bhabar tract gives place to the terai area which is covered with tall elephant grass and thick forests interspersed with marshes and swamps. The sluggish rivers of the Bhabar deepen in this area, their course running through a tangled mass of thick undergrowth. The terai runs parallel to the Bhabar in a thin strip. The main crops are wheat, rice, and sugar cane. Jute also is grown.

The most important area for the economy of the state is the Gangetic plain which stretches across the entire length of the state from east to west. The entire alluvial plain can be divided into three sub-regions. The first is the eastern tract consisting of 14 districts which are subject to periodical floods and droughts and have been classified as scarcity areas. These districts have the highest density of population which gives the lowest per capita land. The other two regions, the central and the western are comparatively better with a well-developed irrigation system. They suffer from waterlogging and large-scale user tracts. The Gangetic plain is watered by the Yamuna, the Ganges and its major tributaries, the Ramganga, the Gomati, the Ghaghra and Gandak. The whole plain is alluvial and very fertile. The chief crops cultivated here are rice, wheat, pearl millet, gram, and barley. Sugar cane is the chief cash crop of the region. • The southern fringe of the Gangetic is demarcated by the Vindhya Hills and plateau. It comprises the four districts of Jhansi, Jalaun, Banda, and Hamirpur in Bundelkhand division, Meja and Karchhana tehsils of Allahabad district, the whole of Mirzapur district south of Ganges and Chakia tehsil of Chandauli district. The ground is strong with low hills. The Betwa and Ken rivers join the Yamuna from the south-west in this region. It has four distinct kinds of soil, two of which are agriculturally difficult to manage. They are black cotton soil. Rainfall is scanty and erratic and water-resources are scarce. Dry farming is practical on a large scale.

== Climate ==
The climate of the state is tropical monsoon. The average temperature varies in the plains from 3 to 4 °C in January to 43 to 45 °C in May and June. There are three distinct seasons - winter from October to February, summer from March to mid-June, and the rainy season from June to September.

The rainfall in the plains is heaviest in the east and decreases towards the north-west. Floods are a recurring problem in the state, causing damage to crops, life, and property. The worst floods were in 1971, when 51 of the 54 districts of the state were affected — an area of nearly 52,000 square kilometres. The eastern districts are the most vulnerable to floods, the western districts slightly less and the central region markedly less. The eastern districts susceptibility to floods is ascribed, among other things, to heavy rainfall, low flat country, high subsoil water level and the silting of beds which causes river levels to rise. The problem in the western districts is mainly poor drainage caused by the obstruction of roads, railways, canals, new built-up areas etc. There is water logging in large areas. The major flood-prone rivers are the Ganga, Yamuna, Gomti, Ghaghara, Rapti, Sharda and Ramganga. The inadequate drainage capacity of the smaller western Sirsa, Kali and the Aligarh drain is also a cause of floods.

== Flora and fauna ==
Recorded Forest Area constitutes about 6.88% of the total geographical area of the state and Total Forest and Tree cover is 9.01% of total geographical area. The Terai and Bhabar area in the Gangetic Plain have most of the forests. The Vindhyan forests consists mostly of scrub. The districts of Jaunpur, Ghazipur and Ballia have no forest land, while 31 other districts have less forest area.

=== Forests ===
The existing flora in Uttar Pradesh can be classified into three categories-

- Wet tropical deciduous forests.
- Dry tropical deciduous forests.
- Tropical thorny forests.

On the Shivalik foothills and in the terai-bhabhar area grow the sal and gigantic haldu. Along river courses the shisham grows in abundance. The Vindhyan forests have dhak, teak, mahua, salai, chironji and tendu. Sisso is mostly used for furniture while khair yields kattha, which is taken with betel leaves or pan. Semal and gutel are used as matchwood and kanju in the plywood industry. Babul provides the principal tanning material of the state. Some of the grasses such as baib and bamboo are raw material for the paper industry. Tendu leaves are used in making bidis (Indian cigarettes), and cane is used in baskets and furniture.

Species of grasses have been collected from the Gangetic plain. Herbs include medicinal plants like Rauvolfia serpentina, Viala serpens, podophyllum, hexandrum and Ephecra gerardiana.

=== Animal life ===
Corresponding to its variegated topography and climate, the state has a wealth of animal life. Its avifauna is among the richest in the country. Animals that can be found in the jungles of Uttar Pradesh include the tiger, leopard, wild bear, sloth bear, chital, sambhar, golden jackal, porcupine, jungle cat, hare, squirrel, monitor lizards, and fox. The most common birds include the crow, pigeon, dove, jungle fowl, black partridge, house sparrow, peafowl, blue jay, parakeet, kite, mynah, quail, bulbul, kingfisher and woodpecker.

Certain species are found in special habitats. The elephant is confined to the terai and the foothills. The gond and para also found in this region. The chinkara and the sandgrouse prefer a dry climate, and are native to the Vindhyan forests. Among the game birds resident in the state are the snipe, comb duck, grey duck, cotton teal and whistling teal.

Several species of wildlife have become extinct in Uttar Pradesh. Among them are the lion from the Gangetic plain and the rhinoceros from the terai. The fate of many species is uncertain, including the tiger, black buck, serow, swamp deer, bustard, pink-headed duck, and mural pheasants and four-horned antelope. Although determined enforcement of laws against poaching and hunting has yielded some success, the wildlife population today is alarmingly low. Gharials are still poached for their skin.

To preserve its wildlife, the state has established one National Park, Dudhwa National Park, and 12 game sanctuaries.

== See also ==
- Geography of India
