= Kenneth A. R. Kennedy =

American anthropologist

Kenneth Adrian Raine Kennedy (June 26, 1930 – April 23, 2014) was an anthropologist who studied at the University of California, Berkeley. He was professor emeritus of Ecology and Evolutionary Biology, Anthropology and Asian Studies in the Division of Biological Sciences at Cornell University. Among his areas of interest have been forensic anthropology and human skeletal biology. He died in Ithaca, New York on April 23, 2014.

== Publications ==
- 2003, Palaeoanthropology-South Asia. In: Encyclopedia of Modern Asia. D. Levinson and K. Christensen, eds. pp. 448–452. New York: Charles Schribner's Sons.
- 2000, God-Apes and Fossil Men: Palaeoanthropology of South Asia Ann Arbor: University of Michigan Press.
- 2002 Kennedy, K. A. R., V. N. Misra, J. R. Lukacs, S. C. Tiwari, and V. S. Wakankar. Skeletal Biology of the Human Remains from the Mesolithic and Palaeolithic Levels of Bhimbetka Rockshelters of Madhya Pradesh, India. Pune: Indian Society for Prehistoric and Quaternary Studies.
- 2002 Kennedy, K. A. R. Trials in Court: The Forensic Anthropologist Takes the Stand. In: Hard Evidence: Case Studies in Forensic Anthropology. D. W. Steadman, ed. pp. 77–86. Upper Saddle River, New Jersey: Prentice-Hall.
- 1998, Kennedy, K. A. R. and A. A. Elgart. South Asia: India and Sri Lanka. Hominid Remains: An Update. 8:95. R. Orban and P. Semal, eds. Brussels: Anthropologie et Prehistoire, Institut Royal des Sciences Naturelles de Belgique.
- Hemphill, B.E.; Lukacs, J.R.; Kennedy, K.A.R. (1991). "Biological adaptions and affinities of the Bronze Age Harappans". Harappa Excavations 1986-1990. (Ed. R.Meadow): 137–182.
- 1984. “A Reassessment of the Theories of Racial Origins of the People of the Indus Valley Civilization from Recent Anthropological Data.” In Studies in the Archaeology and Palaeoanthropology of South Asia (99–107).
- 1995. “Have Aryans been identified in the prehistoric skeletal record from South Asia?”, in George Erdosy, ed.: The Indo-Aryans of Ancient South Asia, p. 49-54.
