= God-Apes and Fossil Men =

2000 book by Kenneth A.R. Kennedy

- Author: Kenneth A.R. Kennedy
- Language: English
- Subject: Paleoanthropology
- Publisher: University of Michigan Press
- Publication date: 2000
- Publication place: United States
- Media type: Documentary
- Pages: 504
- ISBN: 978-0472110131

God-Apes and Fossil Men is a book on paleoanthropology in the Indian subcontinent by Kenneth A.R. Kennedy (Ann Arbor, 2000). The book is a detailed study of the history of Indian paleoanthropology and of the fossil record of prehistoric people of the Indian Subcontinent.

== Contents ==
The fifth chapter is about the prehistoric God-Apes of the Siwalik hills. Other chapters describe the fossil hominids of the Pleistocene. The Mesolithic skeletal record is also described, and the last chapters treat the Harappan civilization and the Megalith builders.
