= Maharashtra Shahir =

- Theatrical release poster
- Directed by: Kedar Shinde
- Written by: Vasundara Sable; Kedar Shinde
- Screenplay by: Pratima Kulkarni; Omkar Mangesh Datt
- Story by: Vasundhara Sable
- Based on: Shahir Sable
- Produced by: Sanjay Chhabria; Bela Shinde
- Starring: Ankush Chaudhari; Sana Kedar Shinde
- Cinematography: Vasudev Rane
- Edited by: Mayur Hardas
- Music by: Ajay-Atul
- Production companies: Everest Entertainment; Kedar Shinde Productions
- Release date: 28 April 2023
- Running time: 143 minutes
- Country: India
- Language: Marathi
- Budget: est.₹7 crore
- Box office: est.₹5.68 crore

Maharashtra Shahir (transl. A Maharashtra poet) is an Indian Marathi-language musical-biographical film based on the life of Padma Shri Shahir Sable, a Maharashtrian singer, playwright, performer and folk theatre producer and director. It is directed by Kedar Shinde and produced by Sanjay Chhabria and Bela Shinde. It features Ankush Chaudhari and Sana Kedar Shinde in the leading roles. The film's screenplay was written by Pratima Kulkarni and Omkar Mangesh Datt. It was theatrically released on 28 April 2023. It is Fifth grossing Marathi film of 2023.

== Synopsis ==
The musical-biography chronicles the life and times of the legendary Shahir Sable, an iconic figure in the Marathi theatre and music industry.

== Cast ==
- Ankush Chaudhari as Krishnarao Sable
  - Devdatta Dhone as Young Shahir Sable aka Kisna
- Sana Kedar Shinde as Bhanumati Sable
- Ashvini Mahangade as Radhabai Sable
- Shubhangi Sadavarte as Laxmibai Sable
- Nirmiti Sawant as Krishna's Grandmother
- Mrunmayee Deshpande as Lata Mangeshkar
- Dushyant Wagh as Bal Thackeray
- Atul Kale as Yashwantrao Chavan
- Amit Dolawat as Pandurang Sadashiv Sane
- Ankush Prashant More as Devdatta Sable
- Yohana Vachhani as Charusheela Sable
- Parinita Dilip Ghone as Shejarin
- Yugesha Omkar as Vasundhara Sable
- Swapnil Parjane as young vasant
- Harish Baraskar as Ganpatrao

== Production ==
=== Pre Production ===
Kedar Shinde along with Pratima Kulkarni, Vasundhara Sable and Omkar Mangesh Dutt, started working on the story in 2019 and spent nearly two years in conducting research on Shahir Sable and finalising the screenplay. Additionally, Shinde and team conducted extensive research on storyboarding scenes, selecting locations and designing looks and costumes to recreate the period from 1920s to 1980s. The film was, formally, announced by Shinde on his social media account on 3 September 2021, the birth anniversary of Shahir Sable.

=== Casting ===
A promotional video announcing the casting of Ankush Chaudhari in the titular role was released by Raj Thackeray at Maharashtra Day rally on 1 May 2022 at Chhatrapati Sambhajinagar. A poster announcing the casting of Sana Shinde as Bhanumati Sable was released on 3 September 2022.

=== Filming ===
The shooting of the film began on Vijayadashami on 5 October 2022 at Krishnarao Sable's village Wai. Shinde chose the hills of Satara for the shoot, including Pasarni Ghat. The second schedule was filmed in and around Mumbai. The third schedule was shot in Baku, Azerbaijan to present Russia (then USSR) in 1980s. The location was moved from Russia to Azerbaijan due to the Russian invasion of Ukraine. The filming wrapped up on 27 February 2023 after shooting final scenes in Mumbai.

== Marketing ==
The film's official motion poster was released by Maharashtra CM Eknath Shinde at his official residence on 15 February 2023. The film's first song, "Baharla Ha Madhumas" was out on 27 February 2023, which became a viral hit on social media. The official teaser was released on 20 March 2023 by Raj Thackeray in a media event. The official trailer was released on 11 April 2023.

The film's title track, "Jai Jai Maharashtra Majha", was released alongside a promotional video featuring 18 lead actors from Marathi film industry in a media event by veteran politician Sharad Pawar at Yashwantrao Chavan Centre, Mumbai on 25 April 2023.

== Soundtrack ==
Maharashtra Shahir

Soundtrack album by Ajay-Atul
- Released: 2023
- Genre: Feature film soundtrack
- Length: 38:18
- Language: Marathi
- Label: Everest Entertainment

Ajay-Atul chronology
Ved (2022)	Maharashtra Shahir (2023)	Adipurush (2023)

Official audio
- Maharashtra Shahir - Full Album on YouTube

Songs and background score of the film have been composed by Ajay-Atul. Several original songs of Shahir Sable have been reprised and a set of new songs have also been added to the film. Lyrics of the reprised songs are credited to Shahir Sable, Bhanumati Sable and Raja Badhe whereas the lyrics of the new songs are written by Guru Thakur and Ajay Gogawale.

Track listing
No.	Title	Lyrics	Singer(s)	Length
1.	"Jai Jai Maharashtra Majha"	Raja Badhe	Shahir Sable, Ajay Gogawale	3:54
2.	"Baharla Ha Madhumas"	Guru Thakur	Ajay Gogawale, Shreya Ghoshal	3:44
3.	"Gau Nako Kisna"	Guru Thakur	Jayesh Khare, Mayur Sukale, Ajay Gogawale	5:04
4.	"Ambabai Gondhalala Ye"	Guru Thakur	Ajay Gogawale	5:39
5.	"Hey Pawlay Dev Majha Malhari"	Shahir Sable	Atul Gogawale	2:55
6.	"Mi Tar Hoin Chandani"	Bhanumati Sable	Ramanand Ugale	3:20
7.	"Ya Go Dandyavarna"	Shahir Sable	Ramanand Ugale	2:04
8.	"Jejurichya Khanderaya"	Shahir Sable	Atul Gogawale/Ramanand Ugale	2:30
9.	"Vinchu Chawla"	Sant Eknath	Akshay Taak	1:13
10.	"Aadhi Ganala"	Shahir Sable	Ramanand Ugale	3:08
11.	"Paul Thakla Nahi"	Ajay Gogawale	Ajay Gogawale	4:45
Total length:				38:18

== Release ==
Two months prior to the film's release, MLC Sachin Ahir requested on the floor of Maharashtra Legislative Council to declare Maharashtra Shahir as tax-free in the state on 9 March 2023.

=== Theatrical ===
The film was theatrically released on 28 April 2023.

=== Home media ===
It was released on OTT platform Amazon Prime Video on 2 June 2023.

== Reception ==
=== Critical reception ===
Maharashtra Shahir movie received positive reviews from critics. Kalpeshraj Kubal of Maharashtra Times gave the film 3.5 stars out of 5 and wrote "Ajay-Atul's music and the voices of Ajay and all the other playback singers have made the cinematic Madhumas blossom. But, some of the 'tunes' in the background song remind us of Ajay-Atul's old works (music). The rest of Shahir's songs and bharoods are easily brought into the film by the screenwriter, director and music director". Vinod Ghatge of ABP Majha gave 3 stars out of 5 and says "Of course, although there are some technical things, this movie will definitely give you a great experience as an audience. Kedar Shinde and his team have worked hard to create this work of art, a must see to salute that Maharashtra Shahir, to bow down to her contribution". Devendra Jadhav of Sakal wrote "Ajay Atul's music is beautiful. Songs in movies carry the story forward. The movie picks up after the interval. Many old popular songs of Shaheer can be heard and can be seen. The events of Shahir's popular play can be seen on the screen. Khanderaya of Jejuri, one can learn the story behind how Lokdhara of Maharashtra was created". Akhilesh Nerlekar of Loksatta said "This movie is definitely a must see. Although it is a biopic, Kedar Shinde has presented a masterpiece without any compromise in terms of story, screenplay, everyone in Maharashtra must watch the movie at least once".

=== Box office ===
Maharashtra Shahir collected ₹3.33 crore on the six day. The film registered an increase in collections on Monday, earning ₹1.03 crore. The film earned ₹1.65 crore in its three-day opening weekend. The film grossed over ₹5.68 crore at the box office in India. Despite received positive reviews from critics film underperformed at the box-office.

== Accolades ==
Award	Year	Category	Recipient(s)	Result	Ref.
Fakt Marathi Cine Sanman	2023	Best Film Critics	Maharashtra Shahir	Won	
Fakt Marathi Cine Sanman	2023	Best Director Critics	Kedar Shinde	Won	
Fakt Marathi Cine Sanman	2023	Best Actor Critics	Ankush Chaudhari	Won	
Fakt Marathi Cine Sanman	2023	Best Lyricist	Guru Thakur (for song "Gau Nako Kisna")	Nominated	
Fakt Marathi Cine Sanman	2023	Best Music Director	Ajay-Atul	Won	
Fakt Marathi Cine Sanman	2023	Best Playback Singer Male	Jayesh Khare (for song "Gau Nako Kisna")	Nominated	
Fakt Marathi Cine Sanman	2023	Best Playback Singer Female	Shreya Ghoshal (for song "Baharla Ha Madhumas")	Nominated	
Fakt Marathi Cine Sanman	2023	Best Cinematographer	Vasudev Rane	Nominated	
TV9 Aapla Bioscope Awards	2023	Best Film	Maharashtra Shahir	Nominated	
TV9 Aapla Bioscope Awards	2023	Best Director	Kedar Shinde	Nominated	
TV9 Aapla Bioscope Awards	2023	Best Actor in a Lead Role	Ankush Chaudhari	Nominated	
TV9 Aapla Bioscope Awards	2023	Best Actress in a Lead Role	Sana Shinde	Nominated	
TV9 Aapla Bioscope Awards	2023	Best Actor in a Supporting Role	Atul Kale	Nominated	
TV9 Aapla Bioscope Awards	2023	Best Song	Baharla Ha Madhumas	Nominated	
Maharashtracha Favourite Kon?	2024	Favourite Film	Maharashtra Shahir	Nominated	
Maharashtracha Favourite Kon?	2024	Favourite Director	Kedar Shinde	Nominated	
Maharashtracha Favourite Kon?	2024	Favourite Actor	Ankush Chaudhari	Nominated	
Maharashtracha Favourite Kon?	2024	Favourite Song	Baharla Ha Madhumas	Nominated	
Maharashtracha Favourite Kon?	2024	Favourite Song	Gau Nako Kisna	Nominated	
Maharashtracha Favourite Kon?	2024	Favourite Male Playback Singer	Jayesh Khare (for song "Gau Nako Kisna")	Nominated	
Maharashtracha Favourite Kon?	2024	Favourite Male Playback Singer	Ajay Gogavale (for song "Baharla Ha Madhumas")	Nominated	
Maharashtracha Favourite Kon?	2024	Favourite Female Playback Singer	Shreya Ghoshal (for song "Baharla Ha Madhumas")	Nominated	
Maharashtracha Favourite Kon?	2024	Favourite Lyricist	Guru Thakur (for song "Baharla Ha Madhumas")	Nominated	
City Cine Awards Marathi	2024	Best Actor Male	Ankush Chaudhari	Won	
City Cine Awards Marathi	2024	Best Actor Female	Sana Shinde	Won	
City Cine Awards Marathi	2024	Best Music Director	Ajay-Atul	Nominated	
City Cine Awards Marathi	2024	Best Lyricist	Guru Thakur (for song "Baharla Ha Madhumas")	Nominated	
City Cine Awards Marathi	2024	Best Singer Male	Jayesh Khare (for song "Gau Nako Kisna")	Nominated	
City Cine Awards Marathi	2024	Best Singer Female	Shreya Ghoshal (for song "Baharla Ha Madhumas")	Nominated	
MaTa Sanman	2024	Best Actor	Ankush Chaudhari	Nominated	
MaTa Sanman	2024	Best Performance (Actor)	Ankush Chaudhari	Won	
MaTa Sanman	2024	Best Screenplay	Pratima Kulkarni	Nominated	
MaTa Sanman	2024	Best Cinematographer	Vasudev Rane	Nominated	
MaTa Sanman	2024	Best Singer Male	Jayesh Khare, Mayur Sukale (for song "Gau Nako Kisna")	Nominated	
MaTa Sanman	2024	Best Art Director	Eknath Kadam	Won	
Zee Chitra Gaurav Puraskar	2024	Special Outstanding Performance	Ankush Chaudhari	Won	
Zee Chitra Gaurav Puraskar	2024	Best Supporting Actor	Akshay Tak	Nominated	
Zee Chitra Gaurav Puraskar	2024	Best Debut	Sana Shinde	Won	
Zee Chitra Gaurav Puraskar	2024	Best Music Director	Ajay-Atul	Won	
Zee Chitra Gaurav Puraskar	2024	Best Background Music	Ajay-Atul	Won	
Zee Chitra Gaurav Puraskar	2024	Best Lyricist	Guru Thakur (for song "Baharla Ha Madhumas")	Nominated	
Zee Chitra Gaurav Puraskar	2024	Best Male Playback Singer	Ajay Gogavale (for song "Baharla Ha Madhumas")	Nominated	
Zee Chitra Gaurav Puraskar	2024	Best Male Playback Singer	Jayesh Khare (for song "Gau Nako Kisna")	Won	
Zee Chitra Gaurav Puraskar	2024	Best Female Playback Singer	Shreya Ghoshal (for song "Baharla Ha Madhumas")	Nominated	
Zee Chitra Gaurav Puraskar	2024	Best Choreography	Kruti Mahesh	Won	
Zee Chitra Gaurav Puraskar	2024	Best Makeup Artist	Jagdish Yere	Nominated	
Zee Chitra Gaurav Puraskar	2024	Best Costume	Yugesha Omkar	Won	
Filmfare Awards Marathi	2024	Best Actor	Ankush Chaudhari	Nominated	
Filmfare Awards Marathi	2024	Best Actor Critics	Ankush Chaudhari	Won	
Filmfare Awards Marathi	2024	Best Music Director	Ajay Atul	Won	
Filmfare Awards Marathi	2024	Best Playback Singer – Male	Ajay Gogavale (for song "Jay Jay Maharashtra")	Nominated	
Filmfare Awards Marathi	2024	Best Playback Singer – Male	Jayesh Khare, Mayur Sukale (for song "Gau Nako Kisna")	Won	
Filmfare Awards Marathi	2024	Best Playback Singer – Female	Shreya Ghoshal (for song "Baharla Ha Madhumas")	Nominated	
Filmfare Awards Marathi	2024	Best Cinematography	Vasudev Rane	Nominated	
Filmfare Awards Marathi	2024	Best Production Design	Eknath Kadam	Nominated	
Filmfare Awards Marathi	2024	Best Costume Design	Yugesha Omkar	Nominated	
Sanskruti Kaladarpan	2024	Best Film	Maharashtra Shahir	Pending	
Sanskruti Kaladarpan	2024	Best Director	Kedar Shinde	Pending	
Sanskruti Kaladarpan	2024	Best Actor	Ankush Chaudhari	Pending	
Sanskruti Kaladarpan	2024	Best Actress	Sana Shinde	Pending	
Sanskruti Kaladarpan	2024	Best Supporting Actress	Akshay Tak	Pending	
Sanskruti Kaladarpan	2024	Best Music	Ajay Atul	Pending	
Sanskruti Kaladarpan	2024	Best Background Music	Ajay Atul	Pending	
Sanskruti Kaladarpan	2024	Best Male Playback Singer	Ajay Gogavale	Pending	
Sanskruti Kaladarpan	2024	Best Male Playback Singer	Ramanand Ugale	Pending	
Sanskruti Kaladarpan	2024	Best Female Playback Singer	Shreya Ghoshal	Pending	
Sanskruti Kaladarpan	2024	Best Lyricist	Guru Thakur	Pending	
Sanskruti Kaladarpan	2024	Best Dialogue	Pratima Kulkarni	Pending	
Sanskruti Kaladarpan	2024	Best Editing	Mayur Hardas	Pending	
Sanskruti Kaladarpan	2024	Best Makeup	Vikram Gaikwad	Pending	
Sanskruti Kaladarpan	2024	Best Art Director	Eknath Kadam	Pending	
