= List of Indian state anthems =

India is a country in Asia. It is a union made up of states and union territories. Some of these states and territories have adopted anthems for usage at state functions and ceremonies. In other states, songs have been proposed or are in popular, traditional or unofficial use.

== Official state anthems ==
State or union territory	Song name	Translated name	Language	Lyricist(s)	Composer(s)	Adopted
Andhra Pradesh	Maa Telugu Thalliki	To Our Mother Telugu	Telugu	Sankarambadi Sundaraachari	Tanguturi Suryakumari	1975
Assam	O Mur Apunar Desh	O My Endearing Country!	Assamese	Lakshminath Bezbaroa	Kamala Prasad Agarwala	2013
Bihar	Mere Bharat Ke Kanthahar	The Garland of My India	Hindi	Satya Narayan	Hari Prasad Chaurasia and Shivkumar Sharma	2012
Chhattisgarh	Arpa Pairi Ke Dhar	The Streams of Arpa and Pairi	Chhattisgarhi	Nardenra Dev Verma		2019
Gujarat	Jai Jai Garavi Gujarat	Victory to Proud Gujarat!	Gujarati	Narmadashankar Dave	Nishith Mehta	2011
Haryana	Jai Jai Jai Haryana	Victory to Haryana	Haryanvi	Dr Balkrishan Sharma	Paras Chopra	2025
Karnataka	Jaya Bharata Jananiya Tanujate	Victory to you Mother Karnataka, the Daughter of Mother India!	Kannada	Kuvempu	Mysore Ananthaswamy	2004
Madhya Pradesh	Mera Madhya Pradesh	My Madhya Pradesh	Hindi	Mahesh Shrivastava		2010
Maharashtra	Jaya Jaya Mahārāṣṭra Mājhā	Victory to My Maharashtra!	Marathi	Raja Badhe	Shrinivas Khale	2023
Manipur	Sana Leibak Manipur	Manipur, Land of Gold	Manipuri	Bachaspatimayum Jayantakumar Sharma	Aribam Syam Sharma	2021
Meghalaya	Ri Khasi, Ri Pnar, Ri Garo	Meghalaya, My Land	Khasi, Pnar, Garo, English	Neil Nongkynrih, Paul Lyngdoh, Kit Shangpliang (Khasi), Amabel Susngi (Pnar), Iris Watre Thomas (Garo)	Neil Nongkynrih	2024
Mizoram	Ro Min Rêlsak Ang Che	Be Thou Our Counsellor	Mizo	Rokunga		2026
Odisha	Bande Utkala Janani	I Bow to Thee, O Mother Utkala!	Odia	Laxmikanta Mohapatra	Balakrushna Dash	2020
Puducherry	Tamil Thai Valthu	Invocation to Mother Tamil	Tamil	Bharathidasan	L. Krishnan	2007
Tamil Nadu	Tamil Thai Valthu	Invocation to Mother Tamil	Tamil	Manonmaniam Sundaram Pillai	M. S. Viswanathan	2021
Telangana	Jaya Jaya he Telangana	Victory to Mother Telangana!	Telugu	Ande Sri		2024
Uttarakhand	Uttarakhand Devabhumi Matribhumi	Uttarakhand, Land of the Gods, O Motherland!	Hindi, Garhwali and Kumaoni	Hemant Bisht	Narendra Singh Negi	2016
West Bengal	Banglar Mati Banglar Jol	The Soil of Bengal, The Water of Bengal	Bengali	Rabindranath Tagore		2023

== Unofficial and traditional state songs ==
State or union territory	Song name	Translated name	Language	Lyricist(s)	Composer(s)
Arunachal Pradesh	Arunachal Hamara	Our Arunachal	Hindi	Bhupen Hazarika	
Nagaland	God Bless Nagaland		English	Razhukhrielie Kevichüsa	
Sikkim	Jahan Bagcha Teesta Rangeet	Where Teesta and Rangeet Flow	Nepali	Sanu Lama	Dushyant Lama
Uttar Pradesh	Uttar Pradesh Sametata Khud Ko	Uttar Pradesh Covers Itself in the Pages of History	Hindi	unknown	

== Proposed state songs ==
The governments of Goa and Kerala are currently in the process of selecting official state songs.

== See also ==
- Jana Gana Mana, the national anthem of India
- Vande Mataram, the national song of India
- List of regional anthems
- List of Indian state symbols
- List of Indian state flags
- List of Indian state emblems
- List of Indian state mottos
- List of Indian state foundation days
- List of Indian state animals
- List of Indian state birds
- List of Indian state flowers
- List of Indian state trees
