= Music of Mizoram =

Music culture of the Mizo people

The music of Mizoram encompasses the folk, sacred, and popular musical traditions of the Mizo people of northeast India. Traditional Mizo music is primarily vocal, accompanied by drums, gongs, bamboo wind instruments, and other percussion. Music is deeply embedded in Mizo social life; a well-known Mizo saying, Khuang lova chai ang ("a festival without a drum"), conveys that life without music is incomplete. Scholars of Tibeto-Burman cultures have characterised the Mizo as a people who in all they do, think, or believe, mark their experience in song, and with the introduction of literacy many oral compositions survive today as the earliest known examples of Mizo poetry.

== Etymology ==
The Mizo did not traditionally possess a single collective term for music; each instrument and each form of song had its own name. The word rimawi was coined in 1966 by B. Thanmawia, then Deputy Director General of All India Radio, during a broadcast. Rimawi is composed of two syllables: ri (sound) and mawi (melodious, beautiful). The term covers instrumental music but does not necessarily include song (hla) or dance (lam). The word hla, meaning song, is among the most frequently occurring words in Mizo oral tradition and forms part of the name of virtually every recognised song category.

== History ==
=== Early history ===
The precise origins of Mizo music are difficult to establish, and the chronological sequences of its heritage are hard to arrange. The earliest known song forms are couplets believed to have developed during the Mizo settlement at Thantlang in Burma, estimated at around the 13th to 14th centuries AD. According to B. Lalthangliana, the folk songs of this period included dar hla (gong songs), bawh hla (war chants), hlado (hunting chants), and nauawih hla (cradle songs). These early songs were simple expressions of individual experience, lacking the philosophical depth or rational attitudes towards life found in later Mizo compositions.

A more substantial body of song emerged during the settlement at Lentlang in Burma, estimated between the late 15th and 17th centuries, when triplet verse forms appeared alongside couplets. After the Mizo settled in present-day Mizoram from the late 17th century onward, their songs grew more numerous and linguistically refined, and many came to be named after their composers. Notable among pre-colonial composers was Saikuti, a poetess who composed songs encouraging warriors and celebrating their victories.

Mizo historians have argued that the music of the Kabaw Valley period, broadly the 10th to 13th centuries AD, had already developed close to its pre-contact form by the time the Mizo moved into the hills of what is now Mizoram. The influence of the Pagan Kingdom (9th to 13th centuries) is considered the most probable vector through which certain percussion instruments, including the drum, reached the Mizo people via Burmese cultural contact.

The pre-colonial period, spanning the 18th and 19th centuries, is recognised as an important era in the history of Mizo folk literature and music. Prior to British annexation, the Mizo community had inhabited present-day Mizoram for approximately two centuries, and during this time their folk songs evolved in quantity, form, and content. Songs of this era exhibited a higher degree of linguistic refinement and musical sophistication, and many bore the names of their composers, indicating the development of individual authorship in Mizo music.

=== Impact of Christianity ===
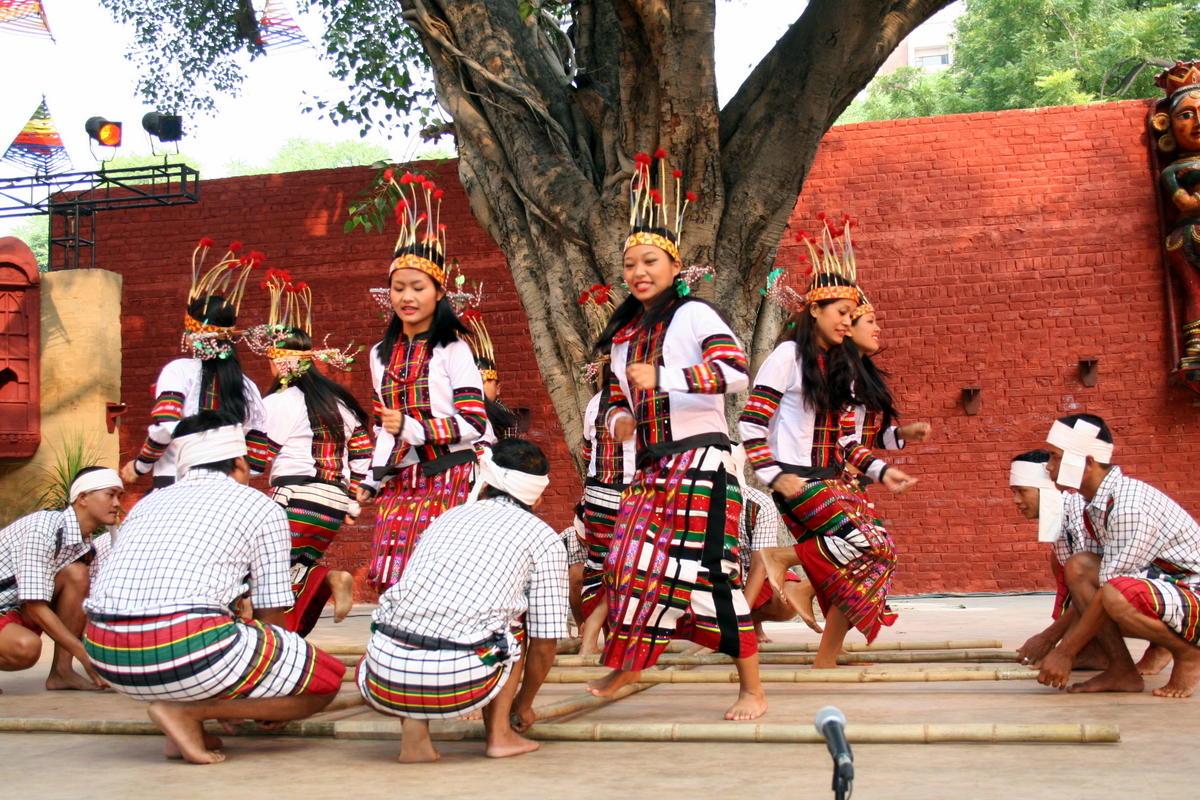
Cheraw dance at the Chapchar Kut festival, 2010. Traditional dances are accompanied by khuang and darbu.

The arrival of Christian missionaries in the late 19th century transformed Mizo musical life. Rev. J.H. Lorrain and Rev. F.W. Savidge, Welsh missionaries who arrived in Mizoram in 1894 under the sponsorship of the Arthington Aborigines Mission, were among the first to introduce systematic literacy and hymnody to the region. The northern region subsequently came under the Welsh Calvinistic Methodist (later Presbyterian) Mission and the southern under the Baptist Missionary Society.

Welsh missionaries brought with them an enthusiasm for congregational hymn-singing and for the tonic sol-fa notation system, which had been a principal choral method in 19th-century Britain. Hymnbooks were published with Mizo words and tonic sol-fa notation, and this system became the foundation of choral music-making in Mizoram, where it remains in widespread use today. The most common hymn book in Mizoram is the Kristian Hla Bu (Christian Song Book), containing 600 hymns, many of which are translations of 19th-century evangelical hymns alongside original Mizo compositions. Tonic sol-fa notation is introduced at the school level, and members of church congregations are often competent sight-readers of the harmonies.

Traditional instruments other than the drum fell into disuse following the missionary period, and the folk music environment shifted toward hymns, gospel music, and choral singing. Many early Mizo-language hymns were direct translations of British evangelical hymns incorporating congregational worship styles. The drum itself was initially banned by some missionary-aligned congregations but was reintroduced during the third spiritual revival and subsequently became central to church worship. A series of spiritual revivals beginning in 1906, influenced in part by the Welsh Revival of 1904, led to the broad and rapid Christianisation of the Mizo population; the Mizo have widely identified as a Christian people since approximately 1930.

During the revival period between 1906 and 1930, a distinct style of congregational singing emerged known as lengkhawm zai. Songs composed specifically for this tradition represent a Christian but indigenous musical practice, combining elements of traditional Mizo melody with Christian themes, and are performed in a monophonic style accompanied by drums. The lengkhawm zai repertoire dominates the Christmas and Easter seasons, as well as periods of mourning and informal community gatherings known as zaikhawm. Although lengkhawm zai and formal Western choral singing are stylistically divergent, both forms have been recognised as performing distinct and equally significant functions within Mizo Christian communities.

A related repertoire, khawhar zai, is associated with death and bereavement. A Mizo death is customarily signalled by communal singing in the home of the bereaved for at least three days and nights, drawing the wider community to the household. This practice has been studied as a distinctive ethnomusicological phenomenon combining theological, anthropological, and musicological dimensions of Mizo life.

The first Western musical instrument brought into Mizoram was a mouth organ, introduced by Mrs Fraser in 1907. Vankhama (1906 to 1970), a well-known composer, later helped popularise the guitar in Mizoram and is recognised for a unique lyrical style; he composed over fifty songs.

=== Nationalism and the hnam hla tradition ===
Alongside the church tradition, a genre known as hnam hla (nationalist songs) emerged in the early 20th century. These songs expressed attachment to the homeland and Mizo identity, and became particularly significant during the formation of the Mizo Union and the insurgency of 1966 to 1986. Mizo nationalism emerged prominently in composition between approximately 1908 and 1911, with composers penning songs that fostered communal solidarity; this musical nationalist current culminated in the formation of the Mizo Union in 1946.

Notable composers of hnam hla include Rokunga (20 February 1914 -- 12 July 1969), Laltanpuia, Kaphleia, and Captain L.Z. Sailo. Rokunga began composing songs recognised publicly from 1934 onward and composed a total of over 127 songs across Christian, nationalist, nature, and festive categories. His choir music extended beyond religious repertoire to include nationalist songs employing poetic expressions of nostalgia and combining them with Christian vocabulary, giving voice to a new form of Mizo patriotism. His hymn calling on God to lead the Mizo people, Aw nang, kan Lal, kan Pathian, was included in the Kristian Hla Bu and has been adopted as the de facto Mizo national anthem. Rokunga was posthumously honoured as Poet of the Century by the Mizoram Millennium Celebration Committee on 14 January 2000.

=== Contemporary music ===
Modern Mizo music spans gospel, pop, rock, and hip-hop, with an active recording and awards scene. The Thazual Awards and the Lelte awards recognise achievement across genres. Fusion bands combining traditional instruments and melodies with modern genres have gained popularity, and dance troupes incorporate contemporary choreography while preserving the essence of traditional forms. The Young Mizo Association (YMA) has organised lengkhawm zai competitions to ensure that younger generations continue to engage with the indigenous Christian musical tradition.

Contemporary Mizo-language gospel music has gained a wide following both within Mizoram and in the diaspora. Rpa Ralte (Lalrinpuia Ralte), a musician and songwriter from Aizawl, is known for the Christmas gospel song "Angelte Zai Ri" (Songs of Angels), featuring Strings For Christ, released in 2021.

== Periodisation ==
Scholars have divided the history of Mizo music into three broad periods.

The first period, known as pipute hla (songs of the ancestors), encompasses the pre-missionary era. This category of song embodies oral tradition, draws heavily on nature imagery, and includes war chants, hunting chants, and other categories described in the indigenous folk song classification system.

The second period, sakhaw thar hla (songs of the new religion), developed within the missionary era from 1894 onward and is shaped by Western hymn forms and tonic sol-fa notation. Many of these songs began as direct translations of British evangelical hymns before a substantial body of original Mizo compositions proliferated through the 20th century.

The third period, tunlai hlate (contemporary songs), encompasses the full range of modern Mizo popular music including gospel, pop, rock, and hip-hop, alongside the continuing development of choral and congregational traditions.

== Classification of folk songs ==
The Mizo possess an indigenous system of song classification. A study of their folk songs on the basis of this indigenous system shows that the Mizo have approximately one hundred different types of folk song. R.L. Thanmawia groups these broadly into ten categories:

1. Bawh hla (war chants) -- These are chants or cries uttered by a warrior returning from a successful raid, asserting his victory over the enemy. Only the warrior who had killed the enemy was permitted to chant bawh hla; after a successful raid he would trample the body of the slain and cry out his own name before chanting. The belief was that performing this rite would prevent the enemy's spirit from haunting the warrior and that the spirit would serve him in Pialral (Paradise) in the afterlife.
2. Hlado (hunting chants) -- Chants celebrating a successful hunt, which could be performed on the spot, on the way home, or at the village celebration. Unlike bawh hla, any witness to the hunt was permitted to join in.
3. Thiam hla and dawi hla (invocation and incantation) -- Verse forms chanted by priests (thiam) and sorcerers during ritual ceremonies. These were transmitted orally and kept strictly private; they were used for medicinal purposes, animal sacrifices, and rituals involving the spirit world.
4. Dar hla (gong songs) -- Instrumental tunes composed for the gong ensemble rather than the human voice. Dar hla literally means "gong song" and employs three musical notes; it is the most numerous named category of Mizo folk song.
5. Puipun hla (festive songs) -- Popular songs composed for community celebrations, including sub-types such as chai hla, chawngchen zai, salu lam zai, and tlanglam zai. These are the most popular among all Mizo folk song categories and were sung communally while dancing at festive occasions.
6. Lengzem zai (love songs) -- Songs named after their amorous themes, with no fixed verse form.
7. Songs named after tribes -- Some verse forms are named after a particular sub-group, for example Sailo zai and Saivate zai.
8. Songs named after villages -- A few songs are named after the village of their composition, such as Lumtui zai and Darlung zai, expressing patriotic attachment to one's birthplace.
9. Songs named after vocal modulation -- A few songs are named after the modulation of the voice or a characteristic sound, such as Kawrnu zai (named after the gentle sound of the kawrnu cicada), Puma zai, and Vai zawi zai.
10. Songs named after individuals -- A large number of folk songs bear the name of their composer or of a celebrated person, such as Saikuti zai, Laltheri zai, and Darpawngi zai.

A defining characteristic of Mizo folk song is that each stanza or couplet is self-sufficient: every couplet or triplet carries its own complete message, a structure typical of oral folk traditions. The pipute hla category in particular is characterised by nature imagery and an absence of the philosophical or religious content that marks later song forms.

=== The Chawngvungi legend and gong songs ===
One of the most celebrated narrative folk songs is the Dar hla associated with Chawngvungi. The song describes the absurdity of the bride price demanded by Chawngvungi's mother, who required the Dar Huai (Gong of the Brave), a prized gong believed to ring of its own accord and considered too sacred to surrender as a bride price. When the gong was surrendered in breach of tradition, a sequence of fatal events followed, culminating in Chawngvungi's death, after which her mother and in-laws composed a lamentation immortalised in a three-note gong melody. R.L. Thanmawia has noted that in one of the oldest folk songs the lines attesting to the extraordinary value of the sacred gong in this narrative are preserved.

== Musical instruments ==
Traditional Mizo musical instruments are broadly grouped into percussion (striking), wind, and stringed instruments. Although simple compared with the classical instruments of other Indian traditions, they served a central role in Mizo festive, martial, and spiritual life. The Asia InCH Encyclopedia of Intangible Cultural Heritage notes that the hills of Mizoram have long been characterised by a strong sense of music and song manifested in locally made instruments. The Mizo possess six varieties of wind instrument and several types of percussion and stringed instrument.

=== Percussion instruments ===
==== Khuang (drum) ====
The khuang is the principal Mizo drum, made from a hollowed log of softwood roughly three feet long, with both ends covered in animal hide. Preference is given to trees with softness and workability. The hide is soaked in water for several days before being dried in the sun, cut to size, and lashed onto the drum with strips of skin. Sound quality varied with the weather: on damp days the skin loosened, requiring splinters to tighten it further.

Drums are classified by size: khuangpui (large), khuanglai (medium), and khuangte (small); an elongated drum is called kawlkhuang. Historically, zawlbukkhuang drums were kept in the zawlbuk (young men's dormitory). Scholars believe the drum reached the Mizo through Burmese cultural contact during the period of the Pagan Kingdom (9th to 13th centuries), with Chinese influence on Burmese drum traditions forming a further possible vector.

The khuang is the only traditional Mizo instrument that remains in widespread daily use in the 20th and 21st centuries. Once absent from religious ceremonies, it became central to church worship services following its reintroduction during the third spiritual revival. In 1995, the Mizoram Department of Arts and Culture organised drum-making competitions to revive traditional craftsmanship.

==== Gongs (dar) ====
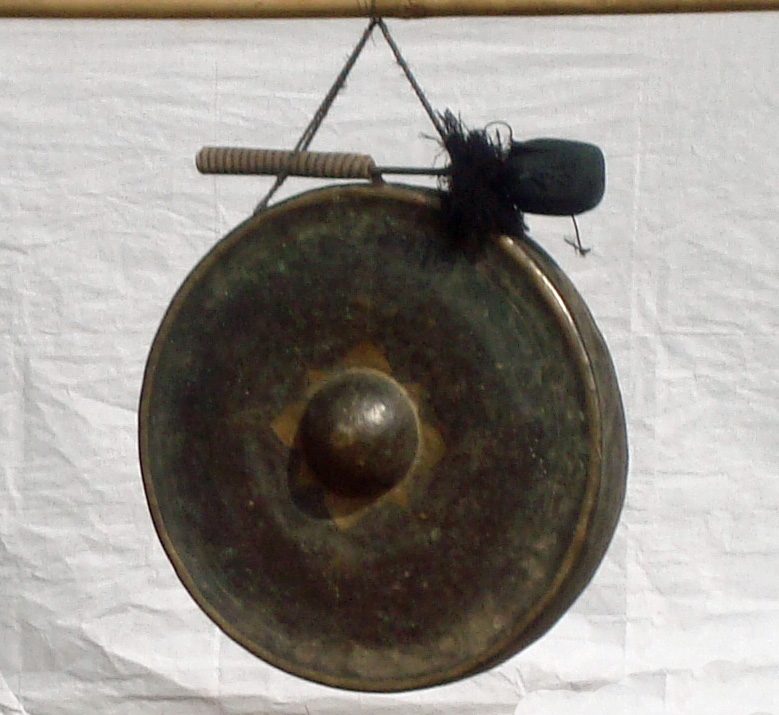
A traditional darkhuang (large brass gong)

Mizo gongs appear to be Burmese in origin, likely acquired during the Mizo residence in the Kabaw Valley during the 9th to 13th centuries AD. The collective Mizo term for gong is dar, and all principal varieties of gong in Mizo use are classified under this broader category.

- Darkhuang (also zamluang) -- The largest Mizo gong, made of brass, with no standardised size. The biggest known example, measuring 31 inches in diameter, is held in the Mizoram State Museum. The darkhuang was a luxury item owned by few individuals and was sometimes used as a means of exchange or demanded as bride price by the parents of a prospective bride. Beyond music, the darkhuang was sounded to convey messages, to call village meetings, for church congregations, and as an alarm for impending raids or wild animals. Since the late 20th century, the darkhuang has been used in the Mizoram Legislative Assembly to signal quorum calls at the opening and close of each session.
- Darbu -- A set of three medium brass gongs producing three distinct notes, typically played by three specialists, one to each gong. In some cases an expert ties two gongs to his body with rope and strikes them against one another, producing three distinct rhythmic notes simultaneously. These gongs were typically owned by a chief or an influential village elder and accompanied dances including Khuallam and Cheraw.
- Darmang -- The smallest gong, used to keep time within the ensemble; it produces two different sounds depending on how it is held. It has no musical effect without the support of other gongs or instruments, but is essential for rhythmic timekeeping during traditional dances.
- Darbenthek -- A pair of equal-sized brass gongs clapped together, typically at festivals.

==== Other percussion ====
- Bengbung -- An indigenous xylophone-like instrument consisting of a series of flat wooden bars producing three musical notes, typically played by girls at leisure. The instrument has fallen into disuse and few contemporary Mizo know how to play it.
- Talhkhuang -- A larger variant of the bengbung, made of three curved wooden pieces of varying depth so that the sounds produced when beaten differ in note. It was brought out only for special occasions, such as the erection of memorial stones at the village lungdawh (entrance platform).
- Sekikhawn -- A hollowed mithun horn beaten to keep time for the darbu and darkhuang, widely used in the Chai dance. It can be beaten against any object or another horn and provides rhythmic support to the gong ensemble.

=== Wind instruments ===
- Rawchhem -- A bagpipe-like instrument made from a dried gourd into which nine bamboo tubes of varying sizes are inserted; five tubes are grouped on one side of the gourd and four on the other. The player blows into a central mouthpiece and produces notes by covering holes with the fingers. Also known as rewchhem, it has fallen out of everyday use and very few Mizo play it today.
- Tawtawrawt -- A bamboo trumpet assembled from successively smaller tubes fitted within one another, with a dried gourd fitted on the widest end. This continues typically until the last tube is approximately the size of a forefinger; it was blown to signal one's location in the jhum (shifting cultivation field) or for amusement.
- Phenglawng -- The traditional Mizo flute, made from a bamboo tube open at both ends with a notched blowing hole and three finger-holes on the opposite end to produce distinct notes. The Mara call it siaramang chanongpa.
- Tumphit -- Three bamboo tubes of different heights tied together in a row; the player blows down each tube to produce a separate note. The tumphit was compulsory during the rallulam ceremony.
- Buhchangkuang -- A flute made from a rice stalk or reed, generally played by girls.
- Hnahtum -- A thin, tender leaf folded and placed between the lips, producing sound when blown; the volume depends on the force of the player's breath.

=== Stringed instruments ===
- Tingtang (tringtrang) -- A one-stringed bowed instrument played in a manner similar to a violin. A bamboo shaft is fixed to a hollow gourd covered with a dried animal bladder; the string is made from the fibre of the Malay sago palm (thangtung) and is drawn with a thin bamboo bow. The word tingtang now colloquially refers to the guitar in Mizo usage.

A folk tale traces the tingtang to a blind woman named Chhunruii, who learned the craft from a feared instrument-maker named Thinglanga during the Mizo settlement in the Kabaw Valley; because of Thinglanga's fearful reputation, no one else would approach him. Chhunruii's wandering performances with the instrument became known as Chhunruii Zai, and after her death the tingtang was further popularised, until it declined into disuse with the introduction of the Hawaiian, Spanish, and electric guitars.

- Lemlawi -- A bamboo instrument related to the jew's harp family, differing from it in shape and size.
- Tuiumdar -- A children's instrument in which a bamboo tube between two joints is carved so that strips of the outer covering are raised as strings and placed over the nodes inside it, played like a small guitar.

== Choral music and tonic sol-fa ==
Northeast India has gained a substantial reputation as a region rich in choral singing, a tradition that can in part be traced to the 19th century when Welsh missionaries brought with them an enthusiasm for congregational hymn-singing. In Mizoram, the tonic sol-fa method introduced by these missionaries became the mainstay of choral music-making, building on what commentators have described as the inherent musicality of the Mizo people. Almost all hymns in the Kristian Hla Bu are printed in SATB (soprano, alto, tenor, and bass) arrangements notated in tonic sol-fa, and this notation remains in use for community choral singing in Mizoram today.

Choirs occupy a significant place in Mizo church life, performing on special occasions rather than in regular weekly services. In a choir performance, participants are hand-picked and have rehearsed together; they perform in at least four parts and exhibit high levels of vocal control and precision before an audience. Many songs performed by choirs today are original Mizo-language compositions; translated choruses including works associated with George Frideric Handel remain alongside a large and growing corpus of original works. The first edition of the Kristian Hla Bu was published in 1899, though the new compositions of Mizo composers were not formally included until the 1950 edition.

== Preservation and scholarship ==
The intangible cultural heritage of Mizo music has been the subject of increasing documentation efforts since the late 20th century. The Mizoram Department of Arts and Culture has been engaged in archiving the state's musical heritage, including maintaining a collection of recorded folk songs used in inter-school and inter-village competitions. The Mizo people are a Tibeto-Burman ethnic group whose folk culture is described as an amalgamation of festivity, kinship, brotherhood, and merriment, and scholars have emphasised the urgency of preserving this intangible heritage as traditional customs give way to globalised modes of life.

Computational and acoustic analysis of Mizo folk songs has been undertaken since the early 2020s. A database known as the Tezpur University-Mizo Folk Song Database (TU-MFSD) has been compiled for acoustic characterisation and automatic classification of Mizo folk songs. Acoustic analysis has confirmed the presence of creaky phonation at the end of sustained vowels in hunting chant and war chant categories, validated by spectrogram analysis, and has demonstrated that percussion events are more frequent in lyrical than in non-lyrical regions of recorded songs. A machine learning classifier trained on this dataset achieved an accuracy rate of approximately 87.5 percent for automatic genre classification of recorded Mizo folk songs.

The role of song in Mizo identity formation has been the subject of academic enquiry that emphasises the function of oral song as a space for memory, offering access to the Mizo past that written history has not fully documented. The Mizo Hlakungpui Mual (Mizo Poets Square), established in 1986 in Aizawl, commemorates outstanding Mizo literary and musical figures with memorial monuments; four phases of monuments have been erected, honouring a total of 36 individuals.

== Notable musicians ==
Classic and pioneer artists
Lallianmawia Pachuau	CFL Hmingthanga	Laltanpuia Tochhawng	H. Lalthakima
C. Lalrinmawia	K. Lalchamliana	Liandailova Chhangte	Lalsangzuali Sailo

Selected contemporary musicians
Name	Notes
K.C. Runremsangi	Called the "Queen of Mizo Folk Song"; received the Padma Shri in 2023.
SaiWanah	His song Ka Pa Khuma, featuring Mary Dawngi, won "Song of the Year 2023" from both the Thazual and Lelte award ceremonies; the song depicts a character named Khuma who finds happiness in a simple agrarian life and has been analysed in relation to the Japanese concept of ikigai.
Rpa Ralte	Songwriter and musician from Aizawl; composed "Angelte Zai Ri" and other Mizo gospel songs.
Mami Varte	Popular female vocalist.
Vanhlupuii	Popular female vocalist.
Young Fella	Awarded "Best Male Artist 2023" at the 9th Thazual Awards.

== See also ==
- Mizo culture
- Cheraw (dance)
- Chapchar Kut
- Darkhuang
- Rokunga
