= List of state songs =

List of state songs may refer to the following:

- List of national anthems
- Anthems of non-sovereign states
  - List of Indian state songs
  - List of U.S. state songs
