= Michael M. Sailo =

Rapper (b. 1979, d. 2017)

- Born: Michael Malsawmzela Sailo; 16 November 1979; Aizawl, Mizoram, India
- Died: 7 April 2017 (aged 37); Aizawl, Mizoram, India
- Occupation: Singer
- Known for: Mizo rap music
- Spouse: B. Malsawmtluangi (SPI)
- Children: 2 sons
- Parent(s): Lalsanga Sailo and Nunthari Sailo
- Awards: Lelte Award for Best Rapper

Michael Malsawmzela Sailo (16 November 1979 – 7 April 2017), also known as Ace Man, was a rap singer from Mizoram, India. He introduced rap music in Mizoram.

== Early life ==
Michael Malsawmzela Sailo was born to Lalsanga Sailo and Nunthari Sailo in Aizawl. He first studied in Pune. He joined Spicer Adventist University where he won medals at singing competitions.

== Career ==
At university he met an African group that inspired him to take up rap music. Joining the group, he toured South Indian cities such as Hyderabad, Mumbai, Bangalore and Chennai. He opened for various groups including VIVA. Returning to Mizoram, he brought along the rap music for which he received awards:

He was a RJ for Red FM and FM Zoawi in Mizoram.

He owned a music studio called Spaceville Pro Sessions. He also practiced traditional singing, composing, DJing and recording techniques. He composed and produced tracks for various singers in his studio including Tini Mohini Thapa, Zorinzuali Khiangte and DJ Lalvenhimi. At one time he was a member the rock band The Scavenger Project.

== Recognition ==
- Best Rapper of the Lelte Award.
- Best New Artist Award of Rimawi Khawvel.

== Death ==
On 7 April 2017, Sailo died in an accident after his bike crashed into a police van.

== Personal ==
He married well known mizo singer B. Malsawmtluagi (SPI) on 17 September 2009. They had two sons, Brooklyn Lalsangkima Sailo (born 2010) and Marshall Lalhruaizela Sailo (born 2012).

== Discography ==
Michael M Sailo released the following albums:

=== Album ===
- Duhaisam
- CHAPTER -2

=== Singles ===
- "Ngaihlai Kan Bang Lo Che"
- "Thinlai Hnemtu"
- "Zawlkhaw Hermawii
- "A riang chan tawk
- "Thinlai Hnemtu" (posthumous)

== See also ==
- Mizo music
