= Arpa Pairi Ke Dhar =

State song of Chhattisgarh, India

Arpā Pairī Ke Dhār
English: Streams of Arpa and Pairi
- अरपा पैरी के धार
- Emblem of Chhattisgarh
- State song of Chhattisgarh
- Lyrics: Narendra Dev Verma
- Music: Narendra Dev Verma
- Adopted: 2019

"Arpā Pairī Ke Dhār" (transl. 'Streams of Arpa and Pairi') is the state song of the Indian state of Chhattisgarh. It was composed by Narendra Dev Verma and was officially adopted in November 2019. The title of the anthem references the two main rivers of the state, the Arpa River and the Pairi River.

== Lyrics ==
Chhattisgarhi original

अरपा पैरी के धार, महानदी हे अपार
इंद्रावती हा पखारय तोर पईयां
महूं पांव परव तोर भुँइया
जय हो जय हो छत्तीसगढ़ मईया

सोहय बिंदिया सहीं, घाट डोंगरी पहार
चंदा सुरूज बनय तोर नैना
महूं पांव परव तोर भुँइया
जय हो जय हो छत्तीसगढ़ मईया

सोनहा धाने के अंग, लुगरा हरियर हे रंग
तोर बोली हवे जइसे मैना
अंचरा तोर डोलावय पुरवईया
महूं पांव परव तोर भुँइया
जय हो जय हो छत्तीसगढ़ मईया

रायगढ़ हावय सुग्घर, तोरे मउरे मुकुट
सरगुजा अउ बिलासपुर हे बइहां
रायपुर कनिहा सही घाते सुग्घर फबय
दुर्ग बस्तर सोहय पैजनियाँ
नंदगाँव नवा करधनिया
महूं पांव परव तोर भुँइया
जय हो जय हो छत्तीसगढ़ मईया

Devanagari transliteration

Arpā Pairi ke dhār, Mahānadi he apār
Indrāvatī ha pakhāray tor paīyañ
Mahuñ pañv parav tor bhuñiya
Jay ho jay ho Chattīsgaṛh maīya

Sohay bindiya sahiñ, ghāṭ ḍongari pahār
Candā surūj banay tor naina
Mahuñ pañv parav tor bhuñiya
Jay ho jay ho Chattīsgaṛh maīya

Sonha dhāne ke ang, lugra hariyar he rang
Tor boli have ja'ise maina
Ancara tor ḍolāvay puravaīya
Mahuñ pañv parav tor bhuñiya
Jay ho jay ho Chattīsgaṛh maīya

Rāygaṛh hāvay sugghar, tore ma'ure mukuṭ
Sarguja a'u Bilāspur he ba'ihañ
Rāypur kaniha sahi ghāte sugghar phabay
Durg Bastar sohay payjaniyañ
Nandgañv nava kardhaniya
Mahuñ pañv parav tor bhuñiya
Jay ho jay ho Chattīsgaṛh maīya

English translation

The steams of Arpa and Pairi, immense is Mahanadi,
Visited thy feet, too, hath Indravati
For thy land I pray,
Victory, victory to thee, Mother Chhattisgarh.

Like a small dot, the ghats of Dongri Mountain,
The moon and sun, too, became eyes of thine.
For thy land I pray,
Victory, victory to thee, Mother Chhattisgarh.

Paddy like a gold limb, green is the cloth's colour,
Same is thy dialect as the beautiful Maina.
Thy lap swingeth eastward.
For thy land I pray,
Victory, victory to thee, Mother Chhattisgarh.

Raigarh is as beautiful as a crown,
Sarguja and Bilaspur are thine arms.
Raipur is like a waist, liberating beauty,
Durg and Bastar are anklets,
Nandgaon is a new waistband.
For thy land I pray,
Victory, victory to thee, Mother Chhattisgarh.

== See also ==
- List of Indian state songs
