= Krishnarao Sable =

Indian artist (1923–2015)

Krishnarao Ganpatrao Sable
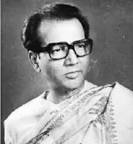
- Born: 3 September 1923; Pasarni, Wai, Satara, India
- Died: 20 March 2015 (aged 91); Mumbai, Maharashtra, India
- Occupations: Folk Artist; Singer; Playwright
- Spouse(s): Bhanumati Sable (divorced); Radhabai Sable
- Children: Devdatta Sable (Son); Charusheela Vachani (Daughter); Vasundhara Sable (Daughter); Yashodhara Shinde (Daughter)
- Parent: Ganpatrao Sable
- Relatives: Kedar Shinde (Grandson)
- Awards: Sangeet Natak Akademi Award (1984), Padma Shri (1998)
- Musical career
- Years active: 1947–2015

Krishnarao Ganpatrao Sable, popularly known as Shahir Sable (3 September 1923 – 20 March 2015), was a Marathi language folk artist from Maharashtra, India. He was an accomplished singer, playwright, performer and folk theatre (Loknatya) producer & director. He was awarded with Padma Shri – India's fourth highest civilian honour, in 1998 for his contribution in the field of arts.

== Early life ==
Shahir Sable was born in a small village called Pasarni, in the Wai taluka of district Satara to Ganpatrao Sable in 1923. He learned to play the flute in childhood. After finishing his primary schooling in Pasarni, he moved to his maternal uncle's place in Amalner, Jalgaon, where he studied till 7th grade and soon left school. At Amalner, he became close to Sane Guruji and spent time with Sane Guruji during the freedom struggle. With his shahiri, he started contributing to the struggle. He also started "Jagruti Shahir Mandal" during that time.

== Famous works ==
- Maharashtrachi Lokadhara (Folk dances of Maharashtra) – Maharashtrachi Lokadhara had performed all over India as a renowned troupe formed by Shahir Sable showcasing all native dance forms of Maharashtra. He gave rebirth to some of the old traditions of folk like Lavani, Balyanruttya, Kolinruttya, Gondhalinruttya, Manglagaur, Vaghyamurali, Vasudeo, Dhangar etc.

=== Noted Songs ===
- Jai Jai Maharashtra Majha
- Vinchu Chavla
- Adhi Ganala Rani Aan Na
- Are Krishna Are Kanha
- Athshe Khidkya Navshe Daara
- Hay Pavlay Dev Majha Malhari
- Jezurichya Khanderaya
- Navra Nako Ga Bai
- Run Zun Vaajantri
- Sahyadricha Sinha Garjato
- Ved Lagale
- Ya Go Dandyavarna Boltoy
- Malharavaari
- Ya Vithucha Gajar Harinamacha

=== Noted Plays ===
- Andhala Daltay – Shahir Sable staged this farcical play highlighting the sorry plight of the Marathi speaking residents of Mumbai. The lore has it that the play was so impactful that it led to the formation of the Shivsena, a political party safeguarding the rights of the native Marathi populace.

== Family ==
Notable family members of Shahir Sable -

- Bhanumati Sable (Wife) - first wife of Shahir Sable and a poet. Many of his famous songs were written by her.
  - Devdatta Sable (Son) - Marathi music composer.
    - Shivadarshan Sable (Grandson) - film director and producer.
  - Charusheela Vachani (Daughter) - Marathi actress
    - Ajit Vachani (Son-in-law) - husband of Charusheela Sable and famous Indian film and television actor.
    - Yohana Vachani (Grand Daughter) - actress and dancer.
    - Trishala Vachani (Grand Daughter)
  - Vasundhara Sable (Daughter) - Marathi writer.
    - Omkar Mangesh Datt (Grandson) - Marathi screenwriter.
    - Yugesha Omkar (Grand daughter-in-law) - Costume designer.
  - Yashodhara Shinde (Daughter)
    - Kedar Shinde(Grandson) - famous film director and writer.
      - Sana Kedar Shinde (Great-Grand Daughter) - Marathi actress.
- Radhabai Sable - second wife of Shahir Sable.

== Awards and recognition ==
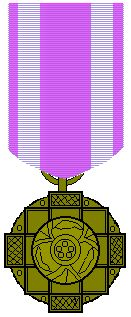
Padma Shri Award – India's fourth highest civilian honour

- 1984: Sangeet Natak Akademi Award
- 1988: Shahir Amar Sheikh Puraskar
- 1990: President, 70th Akhil Bharatiya Marathi Natya Sammelan, Mumbai
- 1990: President, Akhil Bharatiya Marathi Shahir Parishad, Mumbai
- 1990: Maharashtra Gaurav Puraskar
- 1994: Sant Namdev Puraskar
- 1997: Satara Bhushan Puraskar
- 1997: Shahir Patthe Bapurao Puraskar
- 1997: Maharashtra Rajya Gaurav Puraskar
- 1998: Padma Shri (India's fourth highest civilian honour) for his contribution in the field of arts.
- 2001: Best Singer Award from Maharashtra State Government
- 2002: P Sawlaram Puraskar
- 2002: Shahir Pharande Puraskar
- 2005: Maharashra Bhushan award by Maharashtra Times
- 2006: Maharashtra Ratna puraskar
- 2010: Zee Chitra Gaurav Lifetime Achievement Award
- 2012: Lokshahir Vittal Umap Mrudgandh Lifetime Achievement award

== Death ==
He died at his residence in Mumbai on 20 March 2015 at the age of 91, after a long battle with Alzheimer's disease.

== Legacy ==
- Jai Jai Maharashtra Majha, originally sung by Shahir Sable, is widely used and played in the official functions of Maharashtra Government. It was declared as the official song of Maharashtra state in 2023.
- Maharashtrachi Lokadhara was later adapted into TV format by his grandson Kedar Shinde. The show aired on Zee Marathi.
- Many of the songs composed by him (including Jai Jai Maharashtra Majha, Are Krishna Are Kanha, Malharavaari) were later adapted by many contemporary artists for Marathi films.
- A biographical film, Maharashtra Shahir, based on his life and times was released on 28 April 2023. It is directed by his grandson and noted film director, Kedar Shinde. The character of Shahir Sable is portrayed by Ankush Chaudhari. The film also stars his great-granddaughter, Sana Kedar Shinde, in the role of Bhanumati Sable.
