= List of Indian state mottos =

Indian state mottos

India is a country in South Asia. It is made up of 28 states and 8 union territories. 6 states have adopted their own state mottos, while 22 states and 6 union territories use the national motto of India as their state motto.

== States ==
State	Motto	Language	English transliteration	English translation
Andhra Pradesh	సత్యమేవ జయతే	Telugu	Satyameva Jayate	Truth alone triumphs
Arunachal Pradesh	सत्यमेव जयते	Sanskrit	Satyameva Jayate	Truth alone triumphs
Assam	सत्यमेव जयते	Sanskrit	Satyameva Jayate	Truth alone triumphs
Bihar	सत्यमेव जयते	Sanskrit	Satyameva Jayate	Truth alone triumphs
Chhattisgarh	सत्यमेव जयते	Sanskrit	Satyameva Jayate	Truth alone triumphs
Goa	सर्वे भद्राणि पश्यन्तु मा कश्चिद् दुःखमाप्नुयात्	Sanskrit	Sarve bhadrāṇi paśyantu mā kaścid duḥkhamāpnuyāt	May everyone see goodness, may none suffer any pain.
Gujarat	सत्यमेव जयते	Sanskrit	Satyameva Jayate	Truth alone triumphs
Haryana	सत्यमेव जयते	Sanskrit	Satyameva Jayate	Truth alone triumphs
Himachal Pradesh	सत्यमेव जयते	Sanskrit	Satyameva Jayate	Truth alone triumphs
Jharkhand	सत्यमेव जयते	Sanskrit	Satyameva Jayate	Truth alone triumphs
Karnataka	सत्यमेव जयते	Sanskrit	Satyameva Jayate	Truth alone triumphs
Kerala	सत्यमेव जयते	Sanskrit	Satyameva Jayate	Truth alone triumphs
Madhya Pradesh	सत्यमेव जयते	Sanskrit	Satyameva Jayate	Truth alone triumphs
Maharashtra	प्रतिपच्चंद्रलेखेव वर्धिष्णुर्विश्व वंदिता महाराष्ट्रस्य राज्यस्य मुद्रा भद्राय राजते	Sanskrit	Pratipaccandralēkhēva vardhiṣṇurviśva vanditā mahārāṣṭrasya rājyasya mudrā bhadrāya rājatē	The glory of Maharashtra will grow like the first day moon. It will be worshipped by the world and will shine only for the well being of people.
Manipur	ꯀꯪꯂꯥꯁꯥ	Meitei	Kanglasha	The Dragon Lord
Meghalaya	सत्यमेव जयते	Sanskrit	Satyameva Jayate	Truth alone triumphs
Mizoram	सत्यमेव जयते	Sanskrit	Satyameva Jayate	Truth alone triumphs
Nagaland	Unity	English	-	-
Odisha	सत्यमेव जयते	Sanskrit	Satyameva Jayate	Truth alone triumphs
Punjab	सत्यमेव जयते	Sanskrit	Satyameva Jayate	Truth alone triumphs
Rajasthan	सत्यमेव जयते	Sanskrit	Satyameva Jayate	Truth alone triumphs
Sikkim	༄༅།ཁམས་གསུམ་དབང་འདུས	Tibetan	Kham-sum-wangdu	Conqueror of the three worlds
Tamil Nadu	வாய்மையே வெல்லும்	Tamil	Vāymaiyē vellum	Truth alone triumphs
Telangana	सत्यमेव जयते	Sanskrit	Satyameva Jayate	Truth alone triumphs
Tripura	সত্যমেব জয়তে	Bengali	Satyameva Jayate	Truth alone triumphs
Uttar Pradesh	सत्यमेव जयते	Sanskrit	Satyameva Jayate	Truth alone triumphs
Uttarakhand	सत्यमेव जयते	Sanskrit	Satyameva Jayate	Truth alone triumphs
West Bengal	সত্যমেব জয়তে	Bengali	Satyameva Jayate	Truth alone triumphs

== Union territories ==
Union territory	Motto	Language	English transliteration	English translation
Andaman and Nicobar Islands	सत्यमेव जयते	Sanskrit	Satyameva Jayate	Truth alone triumphs
Dadra and Nagar Haveli and Daman and Diu	सत्यमेव जयते	Sanskrit	Satyameva Jayate	Truth alone triumphs
Delhi	सत्यमेव जयते	Sanskrit	Satyameva Jayate	Truth alone triumphs
Jammu and Kashmir	सत्यमेव जयते	Sanskrit	Satyameva Jayate	Truth alone triumphs
Ladakh	सत्यमेव जयते	Sanskrit	Satyameva Jayate	Truth alone triumphs
Puducherry	सत्यमेव जयते	Sanskrit	Satyameva Jayate	Truth alone triumphs

== Autonomous administrative divisions ==
Some of the autonomous administrative divisions established by the Sixth Schedule of the Constitution of India have adopted their own motto.

Autonomous Administrative Division	Motto	Language	English transliteration	English translation
Bodoland Territorial Region	सत्यमेव जयते	Sanskrit	Satyameva Jayate	Truth alone triumphs

== See also ==
- Satyameva Jayate, the national motto of India
- List of Indian state symbols
- List of Indian state flags
- List of Indian state emblems
- List of Indian state songs
- List of Indian state foundation days
- List of Indian state animals
- List of Indian state birds
- List of Indian state flowers
- List of Indian state trees
