= Narendra Dev Verma =

Indian composer

Narendra Dev Verma was an Indian music composer and father in law of Bhupesh Baghel whose song "Arpā Pairī ke Dhār" became the official state song of Chhattisgarh.

== Personal life ==
He was born on 4 November 1939 in Sevagram and died on 8 September 1979 in Raipur.

== Honor ==
- He was tributed by Bhupesh Baghel, Chief Minister of Chhattisgarh on his death anniversary.
