= Mera Madhya Pradesh =

State song of Madhya Pradesh

Merā Madhya Pradeś
English: My Madhya Pradesh
- मेरा मध्य प्रदेश
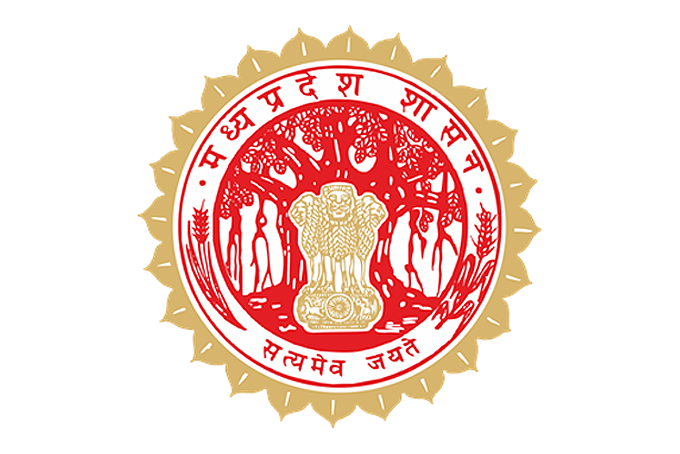
- Emblem of Madhya Pradesh
- State song of Madhya Pradesh, India
- Lyrics: Mahesh Shrivastava
- Music: Mahesh Shrivastava
- Adopted: 2010

"Merā Madhya Pradeś" is the state song of the Indian state of Madhya Pradesh. The song was written by Mahesh Shrivastava and was officially adopted in October 2010.

== Lyrics ==
Hindi original

कोरस:
सुख का दाता, सबका साथी,
शुभ का ये सन्देश है,
माँ की गोद, पिता का आश्रय,
मेरा मध्य प्रदेश है।

विंध्याचल सा भाल, नर्मदा का जल इसके पास है,
यहाँ ज्ञान, विज्ञान, कला का लिखा गया इतिहास है।
उर्वर भूमि, सघन वन, रत्न संपदा यहाँ अशेष है,
स्वर सौरभ सुषमा से मंडित मेरा मध्य प्रदेश है।

कोरस

क्षिप्रा में अमृत घट छलका, मिला कृष्ण को ज्ञान यहाँ,
महाकाल को तिलक लगाने मिला हमें वरदान यहाँ।
कविता न्याय, वीरता गायन सबकुछ यहाँ विशेष है,
ह्रदय देश का यह मैं इसका मेरा मध्य प्रदेश है।

कोरस

चंबल की कल-कल से गुंजित, कथा तन बलिदान की,
खजुराहो में कथा कला की चित्रकूट की राम की,
भीमबेटका आदिकला का पत्थर पर अभिषेक है,
अमृत कुंड अमरकंटक में ऐसा मध्य प्रदेश है,

कोरस

Devanagari transliteration

Koras:
Sukh kā dātā, sabkā sāthī,
Śubh kā ye sandeś hai,
Māñ kī god, pitā kā āśray,
Merā madhya pradeś hai.

Vindhyāchal sā bhāl, narmadā kā jal isake pās hai,
Yahāñ gyān vigyān kalā kā likhā gayā itihās hai,
Urvar bhūmi, saghan van, ratna sampadā yahāñ aśeṣ hai,
Svar saurabh suṣmā se mandit merā madhya pradeś hai,

Koras

Kṣiprā meñ amrit ghat chalkā milā kŕṣṇa ko gyān yahāñ,
Mahākāl ko tilak lagāne milā hameñ vardān yahāñ,
Kavitā nyāy, vīrtā gāyan sabkuch yahāñ viśeṣ hai,
Hŕday deś kā yah maiñ isaka merā madhya pradeś hai,

Koras

Cambal kī kal-kal se gunjit kathā tan balidan kī,
Khajurāho meñ kathā kalā kī Citrakūṭ kī ram kī,
Bhimbeṭkā adikalā kā patthar par abhiṣek hai,
Amrit kuṇḍ amarkanṭak meñ aisa madhya pradeś hai,

Koras

English translation

Chorus:
Giver of happiness, partner of all,
This is the message of auspiciousness,
Mother's lap, father's shelter,
My Madhya Pradesh.

Who has the forehead like Vindhyachal and water of Narmada,
Here, the history of knowledge, science, art has written.
Here, lands are fertile, forests are dense and wealth complete,
My Madhya Pradesh is ornamented with tone, fragrance and color.

Chorus

Nector of immortaity spilled in Shipra where Lord Krishna got educated,
Only here, we got the boon to apply Tilak to Mahakal(Lord Shiva).
Poetry, justice, singing heroism are all pre-eminent here,
This is the heart of the country, I belong here, my Madhya Pradesh.

Chorus

Chambal's self-sacrificing story, from yesterday to tomorrow,
Katha art in Khajuraho, Ram of Chitrakoot,
Bhimbetka is the consecration on the stone of Adikala,
Amrit Kund in Amarkantak is such Madhya Pradesh,

Koras

== See also ==
- List of Indian state songs
