= Arunachal Hamara =

Indian state song

Aruṇācal Hamāra
English: "Our Arunachal"
- De facto state song of Arunachal Pradesh
- Lyrics: Bhupen Hazarika, 1977
- Music: Bhupen Hazarika, 1977

"Aruṇācal Hamāra" (Note: Hindi: अरुणाचल हमारा [əɾʊˌɳaːtʃəl ɦəˈmaːɾaː]; lit. "Our Arunachal") is the de facto state song of Arunachal Pradesh, India. It was written and composed by Bhupen Hazarika, and it first appeared in the 1977 film Mera Dharam Meri Maa.

== Lyrics ==
The vocal versions sometimes begin with a series of "Ha…" (हा) in the lyrics.

Hindi lyrics in Devanagari

𝄆 अरुण किरण शीश भूषण
कंठ हिम की धारा
प्रभात सूरज चुम्बित देश
अरुणाचल हमारा, अरुणाचल हमारा 𝄇

भारत मां का राजदुलारा अरुणाचल हमारा!
प्यार से दुलरायी तोहे तोड़ेंगे विपद सारा!
मन हमारा चंचल धारा होए ना कोई किनारा
प्रभात सूरज चुम्बित देश
अरुणाचल हमारा, अरुणाचल हमारा

𝄆 झूम खेती खेतो में है झूमता नवधान 𝄇
𝄆 मिथुन गौ की पवन पूजा गांव का सम्मान! 𝄇
जाति अजान उपकार हमारा सामूहिक बाल सारा
प्रभात सूरज चुम्बित देश
अरुणाचल हमारा, अरुणाचल हमारा

𝄆 जिले कामेंग सियांग लोहित तिरप सुबनसिरी! 𝄇
तीर्थ मुच्छल कुसुमता है शोभित हिमगिरी!
पंच फूलों का एक गुलिस्तां तन मन से है प्यारा
प्रभात सूरज चुम्बित देश
अरुणाचल हमारा, अरुणाचल हमारा

अरुण किरण शीश भूषण
कंठ हिम की धारा
प्रभात सूरज चुम्बित देश
अरुणाचल हमारा, अरुणाचल हमारा

Hindi lyrics in the Roman alphabet

𝄆 Aruṇ kiraṇ shīsh bhūṣaṇ
Kanṭh him ki dhāra
Prabhāt sūraj cumbit desh
Aruṇācal hamāra, Aruṇācal hamāra. 𝄇

Bhārat mañ ka rājdulāra Aruṇācal hamāra!
Pyār se dulrāi tohe toḍenge vipad sāra!
Man hamāra cancal dhāra hoe na koi kināra
Prabhāt sūraj cumbit desh
Aruṇācal hamāra, Aruṇācal hamāra.

𝄆 Jhūm kheti kheto meñ hai jhūmta navdhān 𝄇
𝄆 Mithun gau ki pāvan pūja gāoñ ka sammān! 𝄇
Jāti ajān upkār hamāra sāmūhik bāl sāra
Prabhāt sūraj cumbit desh
Aruṇācal hamāra, Aruṇācal hamāra.

𝄆 Jile kāmeng siyāng lohit tirap subansiri! 𝄇
Tīrath mucchal kusumta hai shobhit himagiri!
Pañc phūloñ ka ek gulistañ tan man se hai pyāra
Prabhāt sūraj cumbit desh
Aruṇācal hamāra, Aruṇācal hamāra.

Aruṇ kiraṇ shīsh bhūṣaṇ
Kanṭh him ki dhāra
Prabhāt sūraj cumbit desh
Aruṇācal hamāra, Aruṇācal hamāra.

English translation

𝄆 Head adorned by sun rays,
Neck embellished by snow streams,
Land kissed by the morning sun,
Our Arunachal, Our Arunachal. 𝄇

Our Arunachal, dear daughter of Mother India!
We'll nurture her, all her troubles we'll end!
Our minds, restless like a stream, have no end
Land kissed by the morning sun,
Our Arunachal, Our Arunachal.

𝄆 Fields adorned in gala cultivation, 𝄇
𝄆 Village honoured by cows' devotion! 𝄇
We are powerful and united as one.
Land kissed by the morning sun,
Our Arunachal, Our Arunachal.

𝄆 Districts of Kameng, Siang, Lohit, Tirap, Subansiri! 𝄇
A pilgrimage's ornate beauty adorns the snowy peaks.
This garden of five flowers dearer than our lives.
Land kissed by the morning sun,
Our Arunachal, Our Arunachal.

Head adorned by the sun rays,
Neck embellished by the snow streams,
Land kissed by the morning sun,
Our Arunachal, Our Arunachal.

== See also ==
- List of Indian state songs
- Emblem of Arunachal Pradesh
