= Sana Leibak Manipur =

State song of Manipur, India

Sanā Leibāk Manipur
English: "Manipur, Land of Gold"
- ꯁꯅꯥ ꯂꯩꯕꯥꯛ ꯃꯅꯤꯄꯨꯔ
- Emblem of Manipur
- State song of Manipur, India
- Lyrics: Bachaspatimayum Jayantakumar Sharma, 1965
- Music: Aribam Syam Sharma
- Adopted: 1967 (de facto); 12 August 2021 (de jure)

"Sanā Leibāk Manipur" (Meitei: ꯁꯅꯥ ꯂꯩꯕꯥꯛ ꯃꯅꯤꯄꯨꯔ, pronounced [səná lə́i̯bák̚ mənipuɾ]; lit. 'Manipur, Land of Gold') is the official state song of Manipur, in Northeast India.

== History ==
The lyrics were written in 1965 by B. Jayantakumar Sharma and the music was composed by Aribam Syam Sharma. It had been in use as a de facto state song since 1967 and was officially adopted by the Cabinet of the Government of Manipur in 21 August 2021.

== Lyrics ==
Meitei original

ꯁꯅꯥ ꯂꯩꯕꯥꯛ ꯃꯅꯤꯄꯨꯔ
ꯀꯣꯂꯣꯏ ꯅꯪꯒꯤ ꯃꯅꯤꯄꯨꯔ
ꯂꯥꯏꯖꯅꯨꯡꯒꯤ ꯃꯅꯤ ꯅꯥꯔꯛꯀꯤ ꯂꯩꯔꯥꯡ
ꯄꯤꯛꯇꯛꯅ ꯃꯉꯥꯜ ꯆꯥꯎꯕꯤꯅꯤ ꯫

ꯏꯅꯨꯡꯕꯨꯡꯗꯒꯤ ꯍꯧꯔꯛꯄꯤ
ꯆꯤꯡꯂꯣꯟꯅ ꯄꯜꯂꯣꯟ ꯈꯥꯔꯤꯕꯤ
ꯁꯪꯂꯦꯟ ꯐꯤꯖꯣꯜ ꯊꯣꯟꯕꯤ ꯆꯥꯟꯕꯤ ꯍꯩꯕꯤ
ꯆꯤꯛꯅ ꯂꯦꯝꯅ ꯉꯥꯟꯊꯣꯏꯔꯤꯕꯤ ꯫

ꯈꯩꯅ-ꯌꯥꯡꯀꯣꯛ ꯃꯑꯣꯡꯅꯤ
ꯁꯨꯝꯍꯠꯌꯥꯏ ꯑꯣꯏꯕꯤ ꯁꯛꯇꯝꯅꯤ
ꯀꯣꯔꯧꯒꯤ ꯑꯍꯥꯟꯕ ꯈꯣꯡꯗꯥꯐꯝ ꯑꯣꯏꯔꯤꯕꯤ
ꯅꯆꯥ ꯅꯥꯎꯌꯣꯛ ꯅꯥꯎꯀꯣꯟ ꯍꯩꯕꯤ
ꯈꯣꯏꯔꯨꯝ ꯃꯣꯃꯣꯟ ꯃꯤꯅꯣꯛ ꯂꯩꯇꯦꯡꯕꯤ ꯫

ꯁꯅꯥꯅ ꯏꯊꯛ ꯍꯧꯕ ꯂꯝ
ꯂꯨꯄꯥꯅ ꯀꯣꯡꯒꯣꯜ ꯊꯤꯟꯕ ꯂꯝ
ꯁꯪꯕꯥꯟꯅ ꯑꯇꯤꯌꯥꯅ ꯐꯤꯖꯪ ꯑꯣꯏꯕꯤ
ꯃꯅꯤꯒꯨꯝ ꯃꯉꯥꯜ ꯅꯥꯏꯕꯤꯅꯤ ꯫

Romanization of Meitei

Sanā leibāk Manipur
Koloi nangee Manipur
Lāijanungee mani
Nārakkee leirāng
Piktakna mangāl chāobini

Enungbungdagee hourakpi
Chinglonna pallon khāribi
Shanglen fijol shetpi
chānbi heibi
Chikna lemna ngāntoiribi

Kheina Yāngkok maongni
Shumhatyāi oibi shaktamni
Korougee ahānba khongdāfam oiribee
Nachā nāoyok nāokon heibee
Khoirum momon meenok leitengbi

Sanāna ethak houba lam
Lupāna kongol thinba lam
Shangbānna atiyāna fijang oibee
Manigum mangāl nāibini

English translation

A golden land Manipur
Your name Manipur
A pearl from the depths of the water
A flower in the wild
Tiny but sparkling you are.

Risen from the depths of the oceans
Fortified by the mountains
Adorned in lush green robes
Alone thou art in solemn grace.

The outskirts of a Yangkok
Your appearance is a winning face
The first rays of the sun,
A mother so caring for her children
Wrapped in an eternal smile.

A land of golden waves
A land of silver orbs,
Under the blue sky
Like a jewel, you shine.

== See also ==
- List of Indian state songs
- Emblem of Manipur
