= Vanhlupuii =

Indian vocalist (1946–2024)

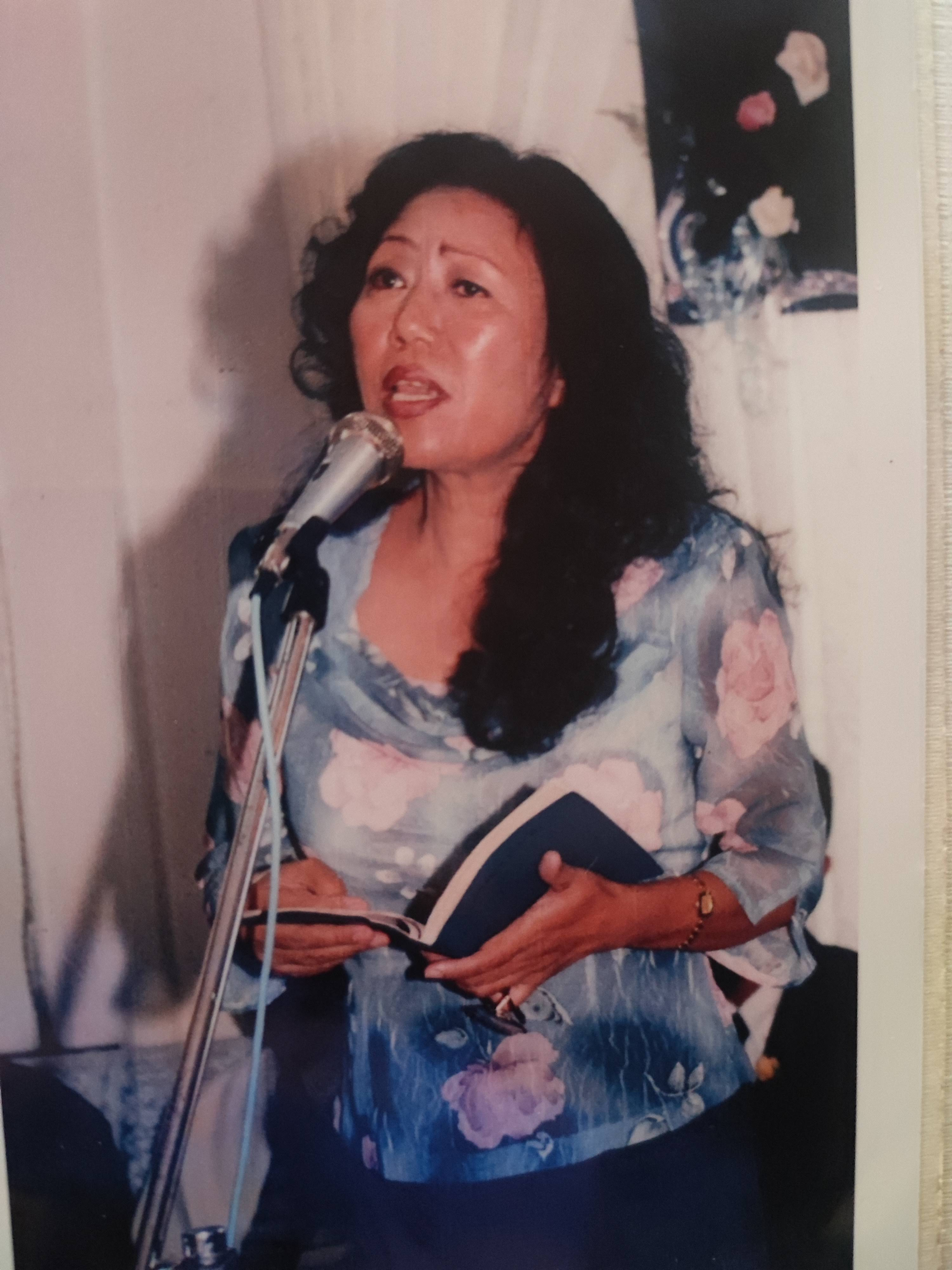
- Born: 2 June 1946; Dawrpui, Aizawl, British India
- Died: 30 March 2024 (aged 77); Aizawl
- Occupations: Vocalist; Gospel singer
- Known for: Mizo vocalist and the only Top Grade Artist of All India Radio (AIR) from Mizoram
- Spouse: Lalthuama
- Children: 3
- Parent: Vankhama
- Awards: Jyoty Prasad Agarwal Award for North East Outstanding Artist in 1978.

Vanhlupuii (2 July 1946 – 30 March 2024) was an Indian Mizo vocalist and a Top Grade Artist of All India Radio (AIR) from Mizoram.

== Early life and education ==
Born in Dawrpui, Aizawl, Mizoram, she was the daughter of the poet and composer Vankhama and Laldengi. She was also the granddaughter of the first Mizo pastor Vanchhunga. She began to learn music at the age of five, but had no formal training. She was the first Mizo woman to complete a Bachelor of Commerce degree. Along with B Lalzela, she was a founder of Central High School in Aizawl.

== Career ==
Her career with AIR began in 1957. She achieved a Grade 'A' in 1969 and eventually secured the title of Top Grade Artist. Vanhlupuii's repertoire spanned a range of genres, including English and Mizo songs. She formed a band named "The Beginners" with her brothers and friends, and the "Vans" along with her siblings. Vanhlupuii performed in various cities in India and abroad, including at the Seventh Day Adventist Church conference in Utrecht, Netherlands.

== Personal life and death ==
Vanhlupuii married Lalthuama and they had three children. She died from a stroke and kidney disease on 30 March 2024, at the age of 77.

== Awards ==
- 1980 LG Trophy
- Jyoty Prasad Agarwal Award for North East Outstanding Artist in 1978.
- Lelte Weely Lifetime Achievement Award
- Zolentu Singer of the Century
- 1999 AIR, Top Grade Artist
- 1966, 67, 68 Thalfavang Kut 1st Prize

== Discography ==
Vanhlupuii has recorded and published the following albums:

1. Thalai Huaisen (Otto Aizawl), 1984
2. I hun tithianghlim la (USA), 1985
3. Vankhama hlate (Otto Aizawl), 1991

== See also ==
- Mizo music
