= Jahan Bagcha Teesta Rangeet =

De facto state song for Sikkim (India)

English: Where Teesta and Rangeet Flow
- Emblem of Sikkim
- de facto State song of Sikkim
- Lyrics: Sanu Lama, 1970
- Music: Dushyant Lama, 1970

Jahan Bagcha Teesta Rangeet (Where Teesta and Rangeet Flow) is a song that serves as the de facto state song for Sikkim, India.

== History ==
The Kingdom of Sikkim became a British protectorate in 1860 and following Indian independence in 1947, became a protectorate of India in 1950. During this period, Sikkim was an absolute monarchy ruled by a monarch known as the Chogyal. The national anthem of the Kingdom of Sikkim was Denjong Silé Yang Chagpa Chilo (Why is Sikkim Blooming So Fresh and Beautiful?), in the Sikkimese language.

The Nepali language song Jahan Bagcha Teesta Rangeet was released 4 April 1970 to mark the birthday of the then Chogyal Palden Thondup Namgyal. The song became very popular and was sometimes erroneously cited as the Sikkimese national anthem. Following a referendum in 1975, Sikkim became a state of India and the monarchy was abolished. The song was initially prohibited by the Indian authorities as it contained a reference to the Sikkemese monarchy. It was later reinstated with slightly altered lyrics which replaced the words "Raja Rani" ("king and queen") with "Janmahbhumi" ("motherland"). Nowadays, the song is used as the de facto state song for Sikkim, played at state government functions and social gatherings.

== Lyrics ==
Romanization

Janha bagcha Teesta rangit,
Jahan Khanchendzonga aseem
Yehi ho hamro dhana ko desh,
Tapawan ho pyaro sikkim

Phulchan yeha aanganai maa,
Chaap, guras, sunakhari
Swargasari sundar desh ko
Hamro pyaro pyaro janmah bhumi

Janha bagcha Teesta rangit,
Jahan Khanchendzonga seer

Batashle bokchaa yaha,
Tathagat ko aamar waani shradha,
Bhakti garchau sadha,
Yehi matokaa phool rahau hami.

Janha bagcha Teesta rangit,
Jahan Khanchendzonga seer

Buddham saranam gacchami,
Dharmam saranam gacchami,
Sangam saranam gacchami.

English translation

Where Teesta and Rangeet flow ahead
Where Kangchenjunga is placed as the head
This is our country of rice,
The pious Sikkim is our land so nice

Here the beautiful flowers blooming
at our courtyard look so genuine
It's almost like a celestial abode
by dint of our motherland.

Where Teesta and Rangeet flow ahead
Where Kangchenjunga is placed as the head

The air carries here immortal preaching words of Buddha,
who did the ultimate toil,
We adore and worship it always as we pine
to remain as the flowers of this soil

Where Teesta and Rangeet flow ahead
Where Kangchenjunga is placed as the head

I will take retreat to Buddha
I will take retreat to Dhamma
I will take retreat to Sangha

== See also ==
- List of Indian state songs
- Emblem of Sikkim
