= Uttar Pradesh Sametata Khud Ko =

De facto anthem of Uttar Pradesh, India

Uttar Pradesh Sameṭta Khud ko Itihās ke Pannoñ Meñ
English: "Uttar Pradesh Covers Itself in the Pages of History"
- उत्तर प्रदेश समेटता ख़ुद को इतिहास के पन्नों में
- Emblem of Uttar Pradesh
- Unofficial state song of Uttar Pradesh

"Uttar Pradesh Sameṭta Khud ko Itihās ke Pannoñ Meñ" (Note: Hindi: उत्तर प्रदेश समेटता ख़ुद को इतिहास के पन्नों में, pronounced [ˈʊt̪ːɐɾ pɾɐˈd̪eːʃ sɐˈmeːʈtaː kʰʊd̪ koː ɪt̪ɪˈɦaːs keː ˈpɐnːõː meː]; lit. "Uttar Pradesh Covers Itself in the Pages of History") is the song of the state of Uttar Pradesh, India, which was adopted in 2022 as part of the 75th Anniversary of Indian Independence.

== Lyrics ==
Hindi lyrics in Devanagari

उत्तर प्रदेश समेटता ख़ुद को इतिहास के पन्नों में
पिढ़ियों की संस्कार संस्कृति से
अपना एक अस्तित्व दिखाया
उत्तर प्रदेश ने भारत को और भी महान बनाया।

हिम पर्वत उत्तर में हिमाचल के
रेतीले पहाड़ सजे दक्षिण में
लिए पश्चिम में राजधानी भारत की
घने जंगलों में मिले पुष्प पशु पूरब में।

पवित्र त्रिवेणी में संगम गंगा जमुना का
स्वर गूंजते लोक गीतों के त्योहारों में
शीत लहर और ताप का अनोखा संगम
उत्तर प्रदेश संजोए विविधता हर पार्श्व में।

लखनऊ जिसकी राजधानी
प्रयागराज न्याय का स्थान है
योग व कर्मयोग से बना
हर क्षण उन्नत उत्तर प्रदेश को प्रणाम है।।

Hindi lyrics in the Roman alphabet

Uttar Pradesh sameṭta khud ko itihās ke pannoñ meñ
Piṛhiyoñ ki sanskār sanskriti se
Apna ek astitv dikhāya
Uttar pradesh ne Bhārat ko aur bhi mahān banāya.

Him parvat Uttar meñ Himācal ke
Retile pahāṛ saje dakṣiṇ meñ
Lie pashcim meñ rājdhāni Bhārat ki
Ghane jangaloñ meñ mile puṣp pashu pūrab meñ.

Pavitr triveni meñ sangam ganga jamuna ka
Svar gūnjate lok gītoñ ke tyohāroñ meñ
Shīt lahar aur tāp ka anokha sangam
Uttar Pradesh sanjoe vividhta har pārshv meñ.

Lakhnau jiski rājdhāni
Prayāgrāj nyāy ka sthān hai
Yog va karmayog se bana
Har kṣaṇ unnat Uttar Pradesh ko praṇām hai.

English translation

Uttar Pradesh covers itself in the pages of history
from the culture of generations
Showing one's existence
Uttar Pradesh made India even greater.

Snowy peaks in the north of Himachal
Sandy dunes in the south
For the capital of India in the west
Flowers and animals found in dense forests in the east.

The confluence of Ganges and Yamuna at Holy Triveni
In the festival of resonating folk songs
A unique combination of cold and heat
Uttar Pradesh cherishes diversity in every aspect.

Lucknow, whose capital
Prayagraj is the place of justice
Made of yoga and karmayoga
Every moment I salute to advanced Uttar Pradesh.

== See also ==
- List of Indian state songs
- Emblem of Uttar Pradesh
