= Jai Jai Jai Haryana =

Official song of the state of Haryana, India

English: Victory to Haryana
- Emblem of Haryana
- State song of Haryana
- Lyrics: Balkrishan Sharma
- Music: Paras Chopra
- Adopted: 28 March 2025
- Director Malvika Pandit

"Jai Jai Jai Haryana" (English: "Victory to Haryana") is the official song of the state of Haryana, India. It was adopted on 28 March 2025 by a unanimous resolution of the Haryana Legislative Assembly.

== Lyrics ==
The song's lyrics, written by Balkrishan Sharma, incorporate the Sanskrit, Hindi and Haryanvi languages.

Hindi original

जय जय जय हरियाणा, जय जय जय हरियाणा ।
पावन धरती वेदों की, जहां हुआ हरि का आणा ।।
जय जय जय हरियाणा, जय जय जय हरियाणा ।

गीता ज्ञान धरोहर इसकी, महाभारत इतिहास ।
मुकुट शिवालिक आधार अरावली, यमुना बहती पास ।।
मौज मनावैं, कातक न्हावैं, पूरी मन की आस ।
सरस्वती के अमृत रस का, यहीं सदा है वास ।।
सादा जीवन सादा बाणा, दूध दही का खाणा ।
जय जय जय हरियाणा, जय जय जय हरियाणा।

छैल छबीले मर्द निराले, सुंदर स्याणी नार ।
होली, दिवाली, ईद, गुरपुरब, मनते तीज त्योहार ।।
भाईचारा जग से न्यारा, बढ़े प्यार में प्यार ।
दिन दूणा अर रात चौगुणा, शिक्षा और व्यापार ।।
बजते डेरू, ढोल, नगाड़े, सांग, रागणी गाणा।
जय जय जय हरियाणा, जय जय जय हरियाणा।

उपजाते हैं फसल सुनहरी, खेतों बीच किसान ।
खेल खिलाड़ी मेडल लाकर करें देश का मान ।।
सीमाओं पर हरदम चौकस यहां के वीर जवान ।
छोटा सा प्रदेश, देश की अजब निराली शान ।।
अतिथि देवो भवः यहां सेवा धर्म निभाणा ।
जय जय जय हरियाणा, जय जय जय हरियाणा ।
जय जय जय हरियाणा, जय जय जय हरियाणा ।।

English translation

Victory for Haryana, Victory for Haryana,
The holy land of Vedas, where Hari came,
Victory for Haryana, Victory for Haryana!

Gita is its heritage of knowledge,
Mahabharata is its crown of history,
Shivalik is its base Aravali,
Yamuna flows nearby,
Enjoy yourself,
Katak takes a bath,
The heart’s hope is fulfilled,
The nectar of Saraswati's juice,
here always resides Simple life, simple arrows,
food of milk and curd,
Victory for Haryana, Victory for Haryana!

Handsome, unique men, beautiful women,
Celebrate Holi, Diwali, Eid, Gurpurab festivals,
Brotherhood is different from the world,
Love grows double by day and quadruple by night,
Education and business,
Deeru, drums, nagadas, songs, ragnis are played
Victory for Haryana, Victory for Haryana!

Golden crops are produced by farmers in the fields,
Sports players bring medals and make the country proud,
The brave soldiers here are always alert on the borders,
A small state, the country’s unique pride,
Guest is God, here service is the duty yes,
Victory for Haryana, Victory for Haryana!

== See also ==
- List of Indian state songs
- Emblem of Haryana
