= Mary Dawgni =

Mary Dawngi
- Born: Mary Malsawmdawngi; Kalemyo, Sagaing Region, Myanmar
- Origin: Aizawl, Mizoram, India
- Genres: Mizo music
- Occupation: Singer
- Instrument: Vocals
- Years active: 2022-present

Mary Dawngi (born Mary Malsawmdawngi) is a Burmese singer based in Aizawl, Mizoram, India. Originally from Kalemyo in Sagaing Region, she fled Myanmar in 2022 following the 2021 military coup and the ensuing civil war.

== Career ==
Before the coup, Dawngi had been active in the local music scene in Kalemyo. After arriving in Aizawl as a refugee, she collaborated with Mizo singer Saiwanah on the song "Ka Pa Khuma," a Mizo-language version of the poem "The Miller of the Dee," released in July 2023. The song's music video accumulated over 15 million views on YouTube. She won "Best New Artist and Song of the Year" at the Lelte Awards ceremony.

Dawngi has since released solo singles including "Duhaisam" and "Aw Bawihte." She has been described as a "household name in Mizoram" and continues to perform live across the state, though visa restrictions have prevented her from performing internationally. She resides in Aizawl with her brother and is registered as a refugee with a local non-governmental organisation.
