= Baburao Govindrao Shirke =

Indian Businessman

- Born: 1 August 1918; Pasarni, Wai, Satara, Maharashtra, British India
- Died: 14 August 2010 (aged 92); Pune, India
- Education: College of Engineering, Pune
- Occupation: Founder chairman of BG Shirke Construction Technology Private Limited (BGSCTPL)
- Children: 3, including Ajay Shirke
- Awards: Padma Shri Award 2003

Padma Shri Baburao Govindrao Shirke (1918–2010) was an Indian businessman, and the founder and chairman of BG Shirke Construction Technology Private Limited (BGSCTPL).

== Early life and education ==
B G Shirke was born on 1 August 1918, at Pasarni village in Wai taluka of Satara district. Shirke hailed from a humble family background and completed his formal education through 'earn and learn' scheme of the government. In 1936, despite lack of money and educational facilities, he passed his matriculation from Dravid High School at Wai. He obtained BE degree in Civil Engineering from the Government College of Engineering, Pune, (then affiliated to Mumbai University) and became the first Civil Engineer from the Pasarani area.

== Career ==
Shirke started Supreme Constructions in 1944, and gained recognition as an efficient builder for building Kolhapur's Jail house in 1945. His business prospered after 1953. 1972 onwards, Shirke expanded to the Persian Gulf region via his officially registered company, Siporex. Between 1962 and 1981, Shirke was involved in several projects undertaken by the Kirloskar Group. Some of the prominent projects he completed include the Mumbai-Bangalore highway, the Mumbai Cricket Association's Bandra Kurla Complex Ground, the Hinjewadi IT park and the Wipro IT park in Chennai, to name a few. The Shirke group has built many government projects in Maharashtra, Karnataka and Andhra Pradesh. Example includes the 1994 construction of Shree Shiv Chhatrapati Sports Complex at Balewadi for the National Games.

== Awards and recognition ==
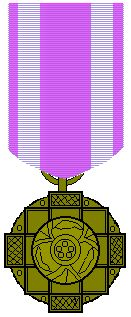
Padma Shri Award - India's fourth highest civilian honour

- B G Shirke was awarded Padma Shri award for his dedication in the field of Science & Engineering in 2003.
