= Mere Bharat Ke Kanthahar =

State song of Bihar (India)

Mere Bhārat ke Kanṭhahār
English: The Garland of My India
- मेरे भारत के कंठहार
- Emblem of Bihar
- State song of Bihar, India
- Lyrics: Satya Narayan
- Music: Hari Prasad Chaurasia and Shivkumar Sharma
- Adopted: 2012

"Mere Bhārat ke Kanṭhahār" (transl. 'The Garland of My India') is the state song of the Indian state of Bihar. The lyrics were written by Satya Narayan and the music was composed by Hari Prasad Chaurasia and Shivkumar Sharma. The song was officially adopted in March 2012.

== Lyrics ==
Hindi original

मेरे भारत के कंठहार,
तुझको शत-शत वंदन बिहार!
मेरे भारत के कंठहार,
तुझ को शत-शत वंदन बिहार!

तू वाल्मीकि की रामायण,
तू वैशाली का लोकतंत्र!
तू बोधी तत्व की करूणा है,
तू महावीर का शांतिमंत्र!

तू नालंदा का ज्ञानद्वीप,
तू ही अक्षत चंदन बिहार!
तू है अशोक की धर्म ध्वजा,
तू गुरू गोविंद की वाणी है!

तू आर्यभट्ट, तू शेर शाह,
तू कुंवर सिंह की बलिदानी है!
तू बापु की है कर्मभूमि,
धरती का नंदनवन बिहार!

तेरी गौरवगाथा अपूर्व,
तू विश्वशांति का अग्रदूत!
लौटेगा हमारा स्वाभिमान,
अब जाग चुके तेरे सपूत!

अब तू माथे का विजय तिलक,
तू आँखों का अंजन बिहार!
तुझको शत-शत वंदन बिहार,
मेरे भारत के कंठहार!

Devanagari transliteration

Mere bhārat ke Kanṭhahār,
Tūjhako śat-śat vandan Bihār!
Mere bhārat ke Kanṭhahār,
Tūjhako śat-śat vandan Bihār!

Tu valmīki ki rāmāyan,
Tu Vaiśāli ka lokatantr!
Tu bodhi tatv ki karuna hai,
Tu mahāvīr ka śāntimantr!

Tu nālanda kā gyānadvīp,
Tu hi akśat candan Bihār!
Tu hai aśok ki dharm dhvaja,
Tu guru govind ki vāni hai!

Tu āryabhatt, tu śer śāh,
Tu kunvar singh ki balidāni hai!
Tu bāpu ki hai karmabhūmi,
Dharati ka nandanavan Bihār!

Teri gauravagātha apūrv,
Tu viśvaśānti ka agradūt!
Lautega hamāra svābhimān,
Ab jāg cuke tere sapūt!

Ab tu māthe ka vijay tilak,
Tu ānkhon ka anjan Bihār!
Tūjhako śat-śat vandan Bihār,
Mere bhārat ke Kanṭhahār!

English translation

Thou art the garland of India,
We bow to Thee in reverence, Bihar.
Thou art the garland of India,
We bow to Thee in reverence, Bihar.

Thou art the Ramayana of Valmiki,
Thou art the democracy of Vaishali.
Thou art the compassion of Buddhism,
Thou art the peaceful chants of Mahavira.

Thou art the beacon of Nalanda's knowledge,
Thou art the indestructible force of heaven.
Thou art the wheel of Ashoka,
Thou art the voice of Guru Gobind Singh.

Thou art Aryabhatta, thou art Sher Shah,
Thou art the great sacrifice of Kunwar Singh.
Thou art the land of Mahatma Gandhi's great deeds,
O Bihar, thou art the blissful garden in this world.

Thou art the song of unprecedented pride,
Thou art the flag-bearer of peace in this world.
Thine erstwhile glory will surely return,
Thy progeny hath finally woken up.

Thou art the victory vermillion on my forehead,
O Bihar, thou art the cynosure of my eye.
We bow to Thee in reverence, Bihar,
For thou art the garland of India.

== See also ==
- List of Indian state songs
