= K.C. Runremsangi =

Indian folk singer

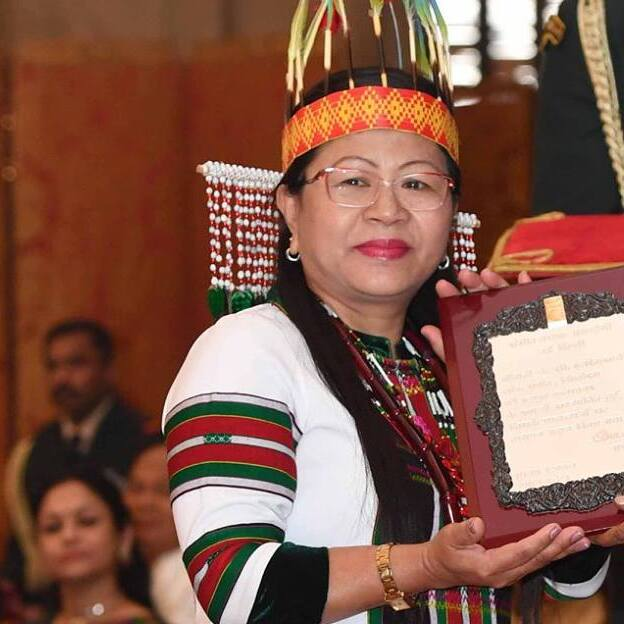
- Born: 1 March 1963 (age 63); Serchhip district
- Other name: "Queen Of Mizo Folk Song"
- Occupations: dance teacher and singer
- Awards: Padma Shri, Sangeet Natak Akademi Award

K.C. Runremsangi (born 1 March 1963) is an Indian folk singer. She has been called the "Queen Of Mizo Folk Song". Mizo is a language. She had made dozens of recordings and her awards include the Padma Shri in 2023 and the Sangeet Natak Akademi Award in 2017

== Life ==
Runremsangi was born in the village of Keitum in the Serchhip district of India on 1 March 1963 and by the age of three she was singing. She enjoyed singing and she was asked to perform at weddings and in the church. She enrolled at the Institute of Music and Fine Arts (IMFA) Mizoram L. Mangaliana.

When her family moved to Aizawl in 1986 she told All India Radio that she was a singer and that launched her singing career. All India Radio commissioned her to sing over fifty Mizo songs in genres including folk and gospel. After six years she went to work for the Art & Culture department of the state of Mizoram.

She has performed at the Chapchar Kut Mizo festival in Mizoram. This festival dates back hundreds of years.

She had made over 50 recordings and her awards include the Padma Shri which she was given by India's president Ram Nath Kovind in 2023. The award was for her contribution to art and culture. In November 2023 she was at ICFAI Mizoram University where she was awarded an honorary doctorate.

She had previously been given the Sangeet Natak Akademi Award in 2017.
