= Bachaspatimayum Jayantakumar Sharma =

Indian writer, composer and lyricist

Bachaspatimayum Jayantakumar Sharma (14 January 1935 – 9 April 2015), shortly known as B. Jayantakumar Sharma, was an Indian writer, composer and lyricist from Manipur.

== Early life and education ==
Jayantakumar was born on 14 January 1935 to a Manipuri Brahmin family at Brahmapur Nahabam Bachaspati Leirak, Imphal, Manipur, India as a son of Bachaspatimayum Angouba Sharma and Noubi Devi. He did his schoolings from CC High School and graduated from DM College in 1958.

== Career ==
Jayantakumar wrote more than 1,300 songs, including the Manipur State Song "Sana Leibak Manipur" and other hits like "Punshi Ishei Sakna Sakna", "Hada Samadon Ayangba", etc., he also wrote 26 plays featured in AIR and five radio plays. He was also a popular live commentator of AIR, Imphal on account of the Ratha Yatra festival.
