= Vankhama =

Mizo language writer (b. 1906, d. 1970)

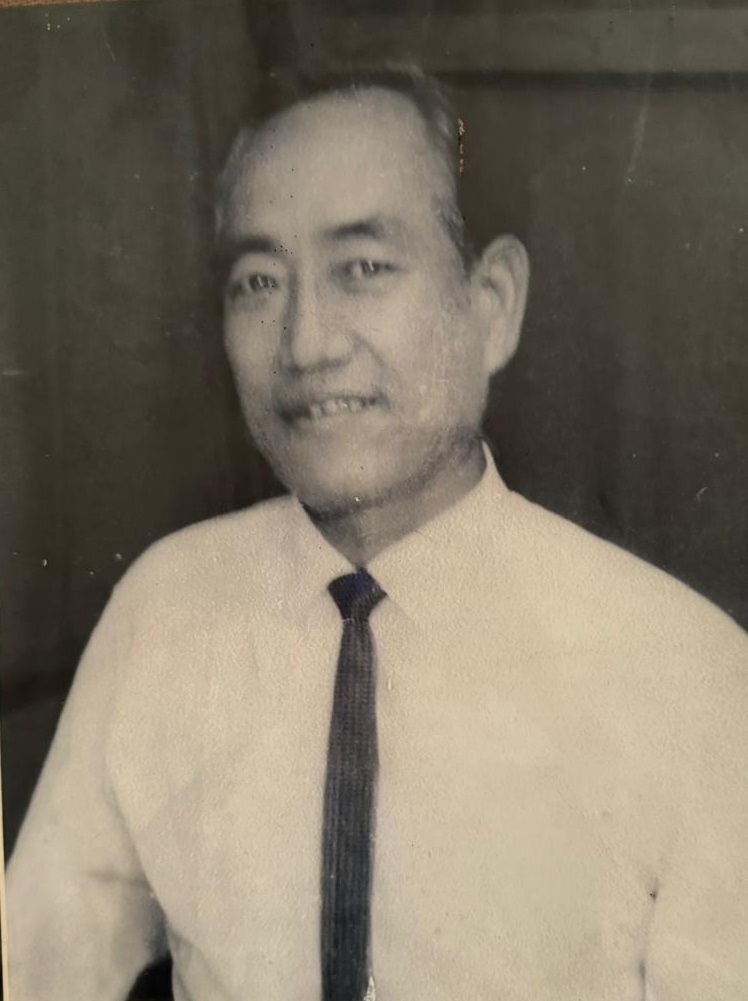
- Born: 1906; Assam, British India
- Died: 1970 (aged 63–64)
- Resting place: Dawrpui Thlanmual, Aizawl
- Occupations: Academic; Writer; Composer
- Known for: Mizo literature
- Children: Vanhlupuii, Vanlalruati
- Parent: Rev. Vanchhunga

Vankhama (1906-1970) was a traditional writer, composer and poet from Mizoram, India. He is known in Mizo literature for his distinctive lyrical style. He composed over 50 songs along his career. Among his famous works are Tlaizawng Par, Nunrawng Hmelṭha, Rimawi Ram and Mizo Vaihlo. He is the first Mizo to have mastered the violin, which he popularized throughout Mizoram. He received much of his musical training from the British Christian missionaries in Mizoram.

== Personal ==
Vankhama was born in Diarkhai village. His father was the first Mizo pastor, Vanchhunga. He studied in various places, including Shillong, Silchar and Calcutta (now Kolkata). In his family life he was married to Pi Laldengi. He is also the father of two well known Mizo singers, Vanhlupuii and Vanlalruati.

== Songs ==
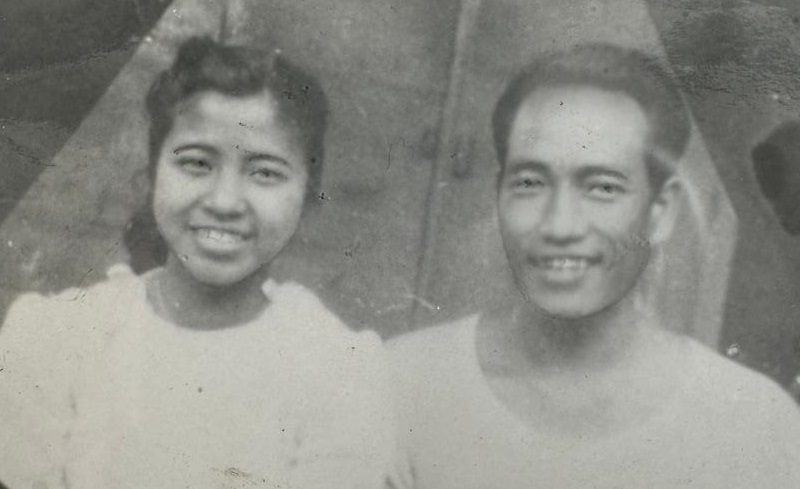
Pu Vankhama and wife Pi Laldengi

Vankhama was the first Mizo Musician to bring the violin and the Hawaiian Guitar from Kolkata in 1926. This quickly prompted local craftsmen to make guitars locally. Some of his more famous works are:

- Khawngai Hnuchham
- Rimawi Ram
- Mizo Vaihlo
- Nunrawng Hmelṭha
