= Devdatta Sable =

- Parent: Shahir Sable
- Musical career
- Occupations: Folk Artist, Singer, music composer

Devdatta Sable is a Marathi singer and composer. He is known for composing music for songs Hi Chaal Turu Turu and Manaachyaa Dhundit and for the Marathi film 'Aakrandan'. Sable has sung the Adivasi song titled 'Dev jevla aamhi pahila' from the film 'Aakrandan' which has been directed by Shashikant Deshpande.

Sable has performed in Maharashtrachi Lokdhara created by Shahir Sable and has composed music for the program Baya dar ughad ('बया दार उघड') written by Sushma Deshpande.

== Awards and recognition ==
- 2011 - Zee Gaurav Purskar (as composer of the Marathi play Baya Dar Ughad)
- 2015 - Sanskruti Kala Darpan Award (for the play Parampara.com)
