= Pasarni =

Village in Maharashtra

Pasarani
- village
- Location in Maharashtra, India Pasarani (India)
- Coordinates: 17.948°N 73.849°E
- Country: India
- State: Maharashtra
- District: Satara

Languages
  - Official: Marathi
- Time zone: UTC+5:30 (IST)
- PIN: 412803
- Nearest city: Wai

Pasarni is a village in the taluka of Wai in the Satara district of Maharashtra.

== Main Attraction ==
- En route is the picturesque Pasarni ghat connecting Wai and hill station of Panchgani.yarana old movies parasuit
- "Swades: We, the People" - 2004 Hindi movie starring Shahrukh Khan was shot here among other villages.
- Also Ajay Devgan starrer Gangajal and Omkara was shot here.

== Notable personalities ==
- Padma Shri Late B G Shirke, the noted industrialist and head of the Shirke Group of Industries was born in this village in 1918.
- Padma Shri Shahir Krishnarao Ganpatrao Sable popularly known as "Shahir Sable", who is a famous Marathi language folk artiste was born in this village in 1923.
