= Pairi River =

Coordinates: 20°58′N 81°52′E

Pairi River is one of the important tributaries of Mahanadi. The river originates from the Bhatigarh hills located near Bindranavagarh of Gariaband District and it joins the Mahanadi near Rajim, Gariaband district in Chhattisgarh, India. Length of River is 90 km.
