= Jai Jai Maharashtra Majha =

Official song of Maharashtra, India

Jaya Jaya Mahārāṣṭra Mājhā
English: Victory to My Maharashtra
- जय जय महाराष्ट्र माझा
- Emblem of Maharashtra
- Official state song of Maharashtra
- Lyrics: Raja Badhe
- Music: Shrinivas Khale
- Adopted: 31 January 2023

"Jaya Jaya Mahārāṣṭra Mājhā" (Marathi: जय जय महाराष्ट्र माझा, pronounced [dʑəj dʑəj məɦaːˈɾaːʂʈɾə ˈmaː(d)zʱaː]; lit. 'Victory to My Maharashtra') is the official state song of Maharashtra. It is a Marathi patriotic song praising the Indian state of Maharashtra. The original lyrics of the song were written by Raja Badhe. The music was composed by Shrinivas Khale and sung by folk singer Krishnarao Sable, popularly known as Shahir Sable. The song is widely used and played in the official functions of Maharashtra Government .

== Traditional version ==
=== Official anthem lyrics ===
This shortened 2 stanza version was adopted by the Government of Maharashtra as the official state song.

Marathi original

𝄆 जय जय महाराष्ट्र माझा, गर्जा महाराष्ट्र माझा! 𝄇

जय महाराष्ट्र माझा, गर्जा महाराष्ट्र माझा!

भीती न आम्हा तुझी मुळी ही, गडगडणाऱ्या नभा.
अस्मानाच्या सुलतानीला जवाब देती जीभा.
𝄆 सह्याद्रीचा सिंह गर्जतो 𝄇 शिवशंभू राजा,
दरीदरीतून नाद गुंजला महाराष्ट्र माझा!

जय जय महाराष्ट्र माझा, गर्जा महाराष्ट्र माझा!
जय जय महाराष्ट्र माझा

काळ्या छातीवरी कोरली अभिमानाची लेणी,
पोलादी मनगटे खेळती खेळ जीवघेणी.
दारिद्र्याच्या उन्हात शिजला, निढळाच्या घामाने भिजला,
𝄆 देशगौरवासाठी झिजला 𝄇 दिल्लीचेही तख्त राखितो, महाराष्ट्र माझा!

𝄆 जय जय महाराष्ट्र माझा, गर्जा महाराष्ट्र माझा! 𝄇
𝄆 जय जय महाराष्ट्र माझा! 𝄇

Romanization of Marathi as sung

𝄆 Jaya Jaya Mahārāṣṭra Mājhā, Garjā Mahārāṣṭra Mājhā! 𝄇

Jaya Jaya Mahārāṣṭra Mājhā, Garjā Mahārāṣṭra Mājhā!

Bhītī na āmhā tujhī muḷī hī, gaḍagaḍaṇāryā nabhā.
Asmānācyā sulatānīlā javāba detī jibhā.
𝄆 Sahyādrīcā siṃha garjato 𝄇 shivashaṃbhū rājā,
Darīdarītūn nāda guṃjalā Mahārāṣṭra Mājhā!

Jaya Jaya Mahārāṣṭra Mājhā, Garjā Mahārāṣṭra Mājhā!
Jaya Jaya Mahārāṣṭra Mājhā!

Kāḷyā chātīvarī koralī abhimānācī leṇī,
Polādī managaṭe kheḷati kheḷa jivagheṇī.
Dāridryācyā unhāta shijalā, niḍhaḷācyā ghāmāne bhijalā,
𝄆 Deshagauravāsāṭhī jhijalā 𝄇 dillīcehī takhta rākhit, Mahārāṣṭra Mājhā!

𝄆 Jaya Jaya Mahārāṣṭra Mājhā, Garjā Mahārāṣṭra Mājhā! 𝄇
𝄆 Jaya Jaya Mahārāṣṭra Mājhā! 𝄇

IPA transcription as sung (Note: See Marathi phonology and Help:IPA/Marathi.)

[d͡ʑə.j d͡ʑə.j mə.ɦaː.ɾaːʂ.ʈɾə maː.d͡zʱaː | gəɾ.d͡zaː mə.ɦaː.ɾaːʂ.ʈɾə maː.d͡zʱaː]

[d͡ʑə.j d͡ʑə.j mə.ɦaː.ɾaːʂ.ʈɾə maː.dzʱaː | gəɾ.dzaː mə.ɦaː.ɾaːʂ.ʈɾə maː.dzʱaː]

[bʱiː.tiː nə aːmʱaː tu.d͡ʑʱiː mu.ɭ̆iː ɦiː | gə.ɖə.gə.ɖə.ɳaːɾ.jaː nə.bʱaː]
[əs.maː.naː.t͡ɕjaː su.lə.taː.niː.laː | d͡zə.ʋaː.b de.tiː d͡ʑi.bʱaː]
[sə(ɦ).jaː.dɾiː.t͡saː sim.ɦə gəɾ.dzə.to | ɕi.ʋə.ɕəm.bʱuː ɾaː.dzaː]
[də.ɾiː.də.ɾiː.tuːn naː.da gun.dzə.laː | mə.ɦaː.ɾaːʂ.ʈɾə maː.dzʱaː]

[d͡ʑə.j d͡ʑə.j mə.ɦaː.ɾaːʂ.ʈɾə maː.dzʱaː | gəɾ.dzaː mə.ɦaː.ɾaːʂ.ʈɾə maː.dzʱaː]
[d͡ʑə.j d͡ʑə.j mə.ɦaː.ɾaːʂ.ʈɾə maː.dzʱaː]

[kaː.ɭ̆jaː t͡ɕʰaː.tiː.ʋə.ɾiː ko.ɾə.liː ə.bʱi.maː.naː.t͡ɕiː le.ɳiː]
[po.laː.diː mə.nə.ɡə.ʈe kʰe.ɭə.ti kʰe.ɭə d͡ʑi.ʋə.ɡʱe.ɳiː]
[daː.ɾi.dɾja.t͡ɕjaː u.nʱaːtə ɕi.d͡zə.laː | ni.ɖʱə.ɭaː.t͡ɕjaː ɡʱaː.maː.ne bʱi.dzə.laː]
[de.ɕə.gəu̯.ɾə.ʋaː.saː.ʈʰiː d͡ʑʱi.zə.laː | dil.liː.t͡se.ɦiː təkʱ.tə ɾaː.kʰito | mə.ɦaː.ɾaːʂ.ʈɾə maː.dzʱaː]

[d͡ʑə.j d͡ʑə.j mə.ɦaː.ɾaːʂ.ʈɾə maː.dzʱaː | gəɾ.dzaː mə.ɦaː.ɾaːʂ.ʈɾə maː.dzʱaː]
[d͡ʑə.j d͡ʑə.j mə.ɦaː.ɾaːʂ.ʈɾə maː.dzʱaː]

English translation

𝄆 Victory to my Maharashtra, roar! my Maharashtra! 𝄇

Victory to my Maharashtra, roar! my Maharashtra!

We do not fear thee at all, O Thundering Sky.
We boldly reply to the Sultans of above.
The lion of the Sahyadri roareth, King Shivaji and King Sambhaji,
From every valley clamoureth "My Maharashtra!"

Victory to my Maharashtra, roar! my Maharashtra!
Victory to my Maharashtra!

Inscriptions of pride he carved on his black chest,
His iron fists battled in lethal fights.
In the heat of poverty he burned; in the sweat of toil he bathed,
He struggled for the nation's glory; he defendeth the throne of Delhi – my Maharashtra!

𝄆 Victory to my Maharashtra, roar! my Maharashtra! 𝄇
𝄆 Victory to my Maharashtra! 𝄇

=== Original lyrics ===
These are the lyrics as sung by Shahir Sable.

Marathi original

𝄆 जय जय महाराष्ट्र माझा, गर्जा महाराष्ट्र माझा!𝄇

रेवा, वरदा,कृष्णा, कोयना,भद्रा, गोदावरी,
एकपणाचे भरती पाणी मातीच्या घागरी.
𝄆 भीमथडीच्या तट्टांना या 𝄇 यमुनेचे पाणी पाजा!

जय जय महाराष्ट्र माझा, गर्जा महाराष्ट्र माझा!

भीती न आम्हा तुझी मुळी ही, गडगडणाऱ्या नभा.
अस्मानाच्या सुलतानीला जवाब देती जीभा.
𝄆 सह्याद्रीचा सिंह गर्जतो 𝄇 शिवशंभू राजा,
दरीदरीतून नाद गुंजला महाराष्ट्र माझा!

जय जय महाराष्ट्र माझा, गर्जा महाराष्ट्र माझा!

काळ्या छातीवरी कोरली अभिमानाची लेणी,
पोलादी मनगटे खेळती खेळ जीवघेणी.
दारिद्र्याच्या उन्हात शिजला, निढळाच्या घामाने भिजला,
𝄆 देशगौरवासाठी झिजला 𝄇 दिल्लीचेही तख्त राखितो, महाराष्ट्र माझा!

𝄆 जय जय महाराष्ट्र माझा, गर्जा महाराष्ट्र माझा! 𝄇
𝄆 गर्जा महाराष्ट्र माझा! 𝄇

Romanization of Marathi as sung

𝄆 Jaya Jaya Mahārāṣṭra Mājhā, Garjā Mahārāṣṭra Mājhā! 𝄇

Revā, Varadā, Kṛṣṇa, Koyanā, Bhadrā, Godāvarī,
Ekapaṇāce bharatī pāṇī māticyā ghāgarī.
𝄆 Bhīmathaḍīcyā taṭṭāṃnā yā 𝄇 yamunece pāṇī pājā!
Jaya Mahārāṣṭra Mājhā!

Jaya Jaya Mahārāṣṭra Mājhā, Garjā Mahārāṣṭra Mājhā!

Bhītī na āmhā tujhī muḷī hī, gaḍagaḍaṇāryā nabhā.
Asmānācyā sulatānīlā javāba detī jibhā.
𝄆 Sahyādrīcā siṃha garjato 𝄇 shivashaṃbhū rājā,
Darīdarītūn nāda guṃjalā Mahārāṣṭra Mājhā!

Jaya Jaya Mahārāṣṭra Mājhā, Garjā Mahārāṣṭra Mājhā!

Kāḷyā chātīvarī koralī abhimānācī leṇī,
Polādī managaṭe kheḷati kheḷa jivagheṇī.
Dāridryācyā unhāta shijalā, niḍhaḷācyā ghāmāne bhijalā,
𝄆 Deshagauravāsāṭhī jhijalā 𝄇 dillīcehī takhta rākhito, Mahārāṣṭra Māzhā!

𝄆 Jaya Jaya Mahārāṣṭra Mājhā, Garjā Mahārāṣṭra Mājhā! 𝄇
𝄆 Garjā Mahārāṣṭra Mājhā! 𝄇

IPA transcription as sung

[d͡ʑə.j d͡ʑə.j mə.ɦaː.ɾaːʂ.ʈɾə maː.d͡zʱaː | gəɾ.d͡zaː mə.ɦaː.ɾaːʂ.ʈɾə maː.d͡zʱaː]

[ɾe.ʋaː ʋə.ɾ(ə)daː kruʂ.ɳə ko.jə.naː bʱəd.ɾaː go.daː.ʋə.ɾiː]
[e.kə.pə.ɳaː.t͡seː bʱə.ɾə.tiː paː.ɳiː | maː.ti.t͡ɕjaː gʱaː.gə.ɾiː]
[bʱiː.mə.tʰə.ɖiː.t͡ɕjaː təʈ.ʈaːn.naː jaː | jə.mu.neː.t͡seː paː.ɳiː paː.d͡zaː]
[d͡ʑə.j mə.ɦaː.ɾaːʂ.ʈɾə maː.d͡zʱaː]

[d͡ʑə.j d͡ʑə.j mə.ɦaː.ɾaːʂ.ʈɾə maː.d͡zʱaː | gəɾ.d͡zaː mə.ɦaː.ɾaːʂ.ʈɾə maː.d͡zʱaː]

[bʱiː.tiː nə aːmʱaː tu.d͡ʑʱiː mu.ɭ̆iː ɦiː | gə.ɖə.gə.ɖə.ɳaːɾ.jaː nə.bʱaː]
[əs.maː.naː.t͡ɕjaː su.lə.taː.niː.laː | d͡ʑə.ʋaː.b de.tiː d͡ʑi.bʱaː]
[sə(ɦ).jaː.dɾiː.t͡saː sim.ɦə gəɾ.d͡zə.to | ɕi.ʋə.ɕəm.bʱuː ɾaː.d͡zaː]
[də.ɾiː.də.ɾiː.tuːn naː.da gun.d͡zə.laː | mə.ɦaː.ɾaːʂ.ʈɾə maː.d͡zʱaː]

[d͡ʑə.j d͡ʑə.j mə.ɦaː.ɾaːʂ.ʈɾə maː.d͡zʱaː | gəɾ.d͡zaː mə.ɦaː.ɾaːʂ.ʈɾə maː.d͡zʱaː]

[kaː.ɭ̆jaː t͡ɕʰaː.tiː.ʋə.ɾiː ko.ɾə.liː ə.bʱi.maː.naː.t͡ɕiː le.ɳiː]
[po.laː.diː mə.nə.ɡə.ʈe kʰe.ɭə.ti kʰe.ɭə d͡ʑi.ʋə.ɡʱe.ɳiː]
[daː.ɾi.dɾja.t͡ɕjaː u.nʱaːtə ɕi.d͡zə.laː | ni.ɖʱə.ɭaː.t͡ɕjaː ɡʱaː.maː.ne bʱi.d͡zə.laː]
[de.ɕə.gəu̯.ɾə.ʋaː.saː.ʈʰiː d͡ʑʱi.d͡zə.laː | dil.liː.t͡se.ɦiː təkʱ.tə ɾaː.kʰito | mə.ɦaː.ɾaːʂ.ʈɾə maː.d͡zʱaː]

[d͡ʑə.j d͡ʑə.j mə.ɦaː.ɾaːʂ.ʈɾə maː.d͡zʱaː | gəɾ.d͡zaː mə.ɦaː.ɾaːʂ.ʈɾə maː.d͡zʱaː]
[gəɾ.d͡zaː mə.ɦaː.ɾaːʂ.ʈɾə maː.d͡zʱaː]

English translation

𝄆 Victory to my Maharashtra, roar! my Maharashtra! 𝄇

Reva, Varada, Krishna, Koyna, Bhadra, Godavari,
They fill the water of unity in my earthen heart.
May the Bhimthadi horses drink the waters of Yamuna!
Victory to my Maharashtra!

Victory to my Maharashtra, roar! my Maharashtra!

We do not fear thee at all, O Thundering Sky.
We boldly reply to the Sultans of above.
The lion of the Sahyadri roareth, King Shivaji and King Sambhaji,
From every valley clamoureth "My Maharashtra!"

Victory to my Maharashtra, roar! my Maharashtra!

Inscriptions of pride he carved on his black chest,
His iron fists battled in lethal fights.
In the heat of poverty he burned; in the sweat of toil he bathed,
He struggled for the nation's glory; he defendeth the throne of Delhi – my Maharashtra!

𝄆 Victory to my Maharashtra, roar! my Maharashtra! 𝄇
𝄆 Roar! my Maharashtra! 𝄇

=== Original poem ===
This is the full poem as composed by Raja Badhe.

जय जय महाराष्ट्र माझा, गर्जा महाराष्ट्र माझा

रावी ते कावेरी भारत भाग्याच्या रेषा
निळेनिळे आकाश झाकते या पावन देशा
तुंग हिमालय, विंध्य अरवली, सह्याद्री निलगिरी
उत्तर दक्षिण वारे पाउस वर्षविती भूवरी
रेवा वरदा, कृष्ण कोयना, भद्रा गोदावरी
एकपणाचे भरती पाणी मातीच्या घागरी
भीष्मथडीच्या तट्टांना या यमुनेचे पाणी पाजा

भीति न आम्हा तुझी मुळीहि गडगडणार्‍या नभा
अस्मानाच्या सुलतानीला जबाब देती जिभा
सह्याद्रीचा सिंह गर्जतो शिव शंभू राजा
दरीदरींतुन नाद गुंजला महाराष्ट्र माझा

गलमुच्छे पिळदार मिशीवर उभे राहते लिंबू
चघळित पाने पिकली करितो दो ओठांचा चंबू
मर्द मराठा गडी ओढतो थंडीची गुडगुडो
ठसक्याची लावणी तशी ही ठसकदार गुलछडी
रंगरंगेला रगेल मोठा करितो रणमौजा

काळ्या छातीवरी कोरली अभिमानाची लेणी
पोलादी मनगटे खेळती खेळ जीवघेणी
निढळाच्या घामाने भिजला
दारिद्र्याच्या उन्हात शिजला
देश गौरवासाठी झिजला
दिल्लीचेही तक्त राखितो महाराष्ट्र माझा

== 2004 version ==
"Jaya Jaya Mahārāṣṭra Mājhā"

Song by Avdhoot Gupte

from the album Dilse Maratha Hai
- Composer: Avdhoot Gupte

Music video
- Jai Jai Maharshtra Maza on YouTube

The song with alterations in music and lyrics was released in 2004 in the album Dilse Maratha Hai by singer and composer Avdhoot Gupte. The album was released by former president of Shiv Sena Uddhav Thackeray at the Thackeray residence "Matoshri", Bandra, in Mumbai. The video featured actors Urmila Matondkar and Vivek Oberoi. Gupte's song however is a mix of Hindi and Marathi. The music is inspired from Bryan Adam's chartbuster song Summer of '69. The new version faced some criticism for the use of swear words considered inappropriate in the song. In defense Gupte said that they were added "to make it peppy".
