= Raja Badhe =

Marathi Poet

Kavi Raja Badhe
- Born: 1 February 1912; Nagpur, British India
- Died: 1977 (aged 65); Delhi, India
- Occupation: Poet
- Works: Jai Jai Maharashtra Majha

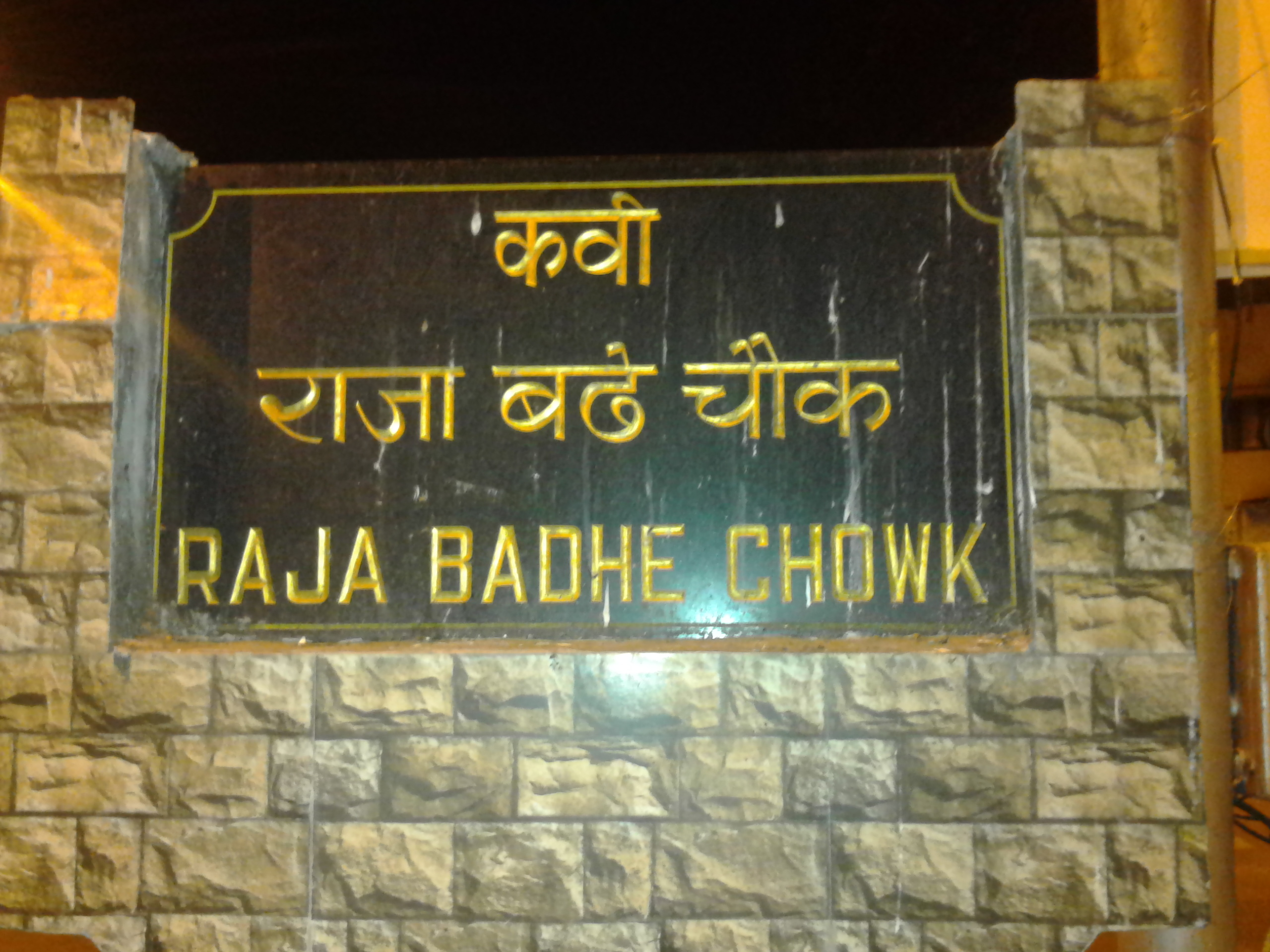
Raja Badhe Chowk on Lady Jamshedjee Road, Mahim, Mumbai

Raja Badhe (1 February 1912 – 1977) was an Indian, Marathi poet from Maharashtra, India. He first made his name in Nagpur as a poet. Later he moved to Mumbai. He worked for All India Radio for some time. He is known for writing the State Anthem of Maharashtra.

Badhe produced a film on Chatrapati Shivaji Maharaj.

Many of Badhe's songs were recorded. When "Prakash Pictures" approached V. D. Savarkar to write songs for their film "Ram-Rajya", he advised them to get them written by Badhe.

He died suddenly in Delhi. He had never married.

A prominent traffic intersection in Mumbai, "Raja Badhe Chowk", is named after him. He was very well remembered for prominent contribution in translation of GATHA SAPTASHATI ( Collection of poems compiled by RAJA HAL SATVAHAN – ANCIENT RULER OF MAHARASHTRA.about 270 BC.

== Songs ==
The following are some songs written by Badhe:

- Jai Jai Maharashtra Majha, sung by Shahir Sable
- Hasates Ashi Ka Mani, sung by Lata Mangeshkar
- De Mala Ge Chandrike, sung by Lata Mangeshkar
- Chandane Shimpit Jashi, composed by Hridaynath Mangeshkar
- Sujan Ho Parisa Ram-katha, a song from film "Ram Rajya" (1943)
