= Rokunga =

Mizo language writer and composer (b. 1914, d. 1969)

- Born: 20 February 1914; Venghnuai, Aizawl, Mizoram, India
- Died: 12 July 1969 (aged 55); Aizawl
- Occupations: Academic; Writer, Song; Composer
- Known for: Mizo literature
- Spouse: Zamawii (1935)
- Children: 5 sons, 3 daughters
- Parents: Thangluta Vaiphei (father); Zaliani (mother)
- Awards: Poet of the Century

Rokunga (20 February 1914 – 12 July 1969) was a traditional writer and composer from Mizoram, India of the Mizo ethnicity.

== Background ==
Rokunga was born to Thangluta Vaiphei and Zaliani. Although his father officially wrote himself under the clan Vaiphei, it was never certain whether they were in fact a different clan, Hmar. Rokunga never used the clan (something like a surname in Mizo name) although he was attributed as either Hmar or Vaiphei by different writers, and instead remarked that "Hmar emaw Vaiphei emaw sawi a ngai hleinem, Mizo nih hi a tawk mai" (There is no need to append [to one's name) either Hmar or Vaiphei, it is honourable enough to be a Mizo [the stem tribe]).

Rokunga started composing at the age of 16, however his songs started to be recognised in 1934. He is most well known for composing patriotic songs, traditional festive and Christmas songs. His remain the "most cherished" patriotic songs among the Mizo people. He composed over 127 songs, and the popular ones being:

- Ro Min Rêlsak Ang Che (Aw Nang, Kan Lal, Kan Pathian)
- Lentupui Kai Vel Romei Chhumin (Ka Pianna Zoram Nuam)
- Raltiang I Kai Ve Ang
- Kan Zotlang Ram Nuam

== Popularity ==
He is one of the best known composers in Mizo literature. Kan Zotlang Ram Nuam (Our Fair Mizo Hill) is among the most popular songs; while Aw nang kan Lal kan Pathian is considered as the Mizo "national anthem".

== Honours ==
He was posthumously honoured as Poet of the Century by Mizoram Millenium Celebration Committee in 2000.

In 2008 a life-sized statue was erected at City Park in Aizawl.

== Legacy ==
In 1999 Rokunga Memorial Society (RMS) was established. The society gives annual Rokunga Award to a Mizo individual who uphold and exemplified the traditional Mizo ethics. The award carries INR 50,000 and, as of 2018, is funded by the Mizo daily news agency Vanglaini.

In 2016 Mizo Poetry Society was established in celebration of the birthday of Rokunga.
