= List of Indian state trees =

India, officially the Republic of India is a country in South Asia, consisting of 28 states and eight union territories. All Indian states and some of the union territories have their own elected government and the union territories come under the jurisdiction of the Central Government. India has its own national symbols. Apart from the national symbols, the states and union territories have adopted their own seals and symbols including trees listed below.

== States ==
List of Indian state Trees
State	Common name	Binomial name	Image
Andhra Pradesh	Neem	Azadirachta indica	
Arunachal Pradesh	Hollong	Dipterocarpus macrocarpus	
Assam	Hollong	Dipterocarpus macrocarpus	
Bihar	Sacred fig	Ficus religiosa	
Chhattisgarh	Sal	Shorea robusta	
Goa	Coconut	Cocos nucifera	
Gujarat	Banyan	Ficus benghalensis	
Haryana	Sacred fig	Ficus religiosa	
Himachal Pradesh	Deodar	Cedrus deodara	
Jharkhand	Sal	Shorea robusta	
Karnataka	Sandalwood	Santalum album	
Kerala	Coconut	Cocos nucifera	
Madhya Pradesh	Banyan	Ficus benghalensis	
Maharashtra	Mango	Mangifera indica	
Manipur	Uningthou	Phoebe hainesiana	
Meghalaya	White teak	Gmelina arborea	
Mizoram	Iron wood	Mesua ferrea	
Nagaland	Alder	Alnus nepalensis	
Odisha	Sacred fig	Ficus religiosa	
Punjab	Indian rosewood	Dalbergia sissoo	
Rajasthan	Khejri	Prosopis cineraria	
Sikkim	Rhododendron	Rhododendron niveum	
Tamil Nadu	Palm	Borassus	
Telangana	Jammi	Prosopis cineraria	
Tripura	Agar	Aquillaria agallocha	
Uttar Pradesh	Ashoka	Saraca asoca	
Uttarakhand	Burans	Rhododendron arboreum	
West Bengal	Alstonia	Alstonia scholaris	

== Union territories ==
List of Indian state trees (Union territories)
Union territory	Common name	Binomial name	Image
Andaman and Nicobar Islands	Andaman redwood	Pterocarpus dalbergioides	
Chandigarh	Mango	Mangifera indica	
Delhi	Flamboyant	Delonix regia	
Jammu and Kashmir	Chinar	Platanus orientalis	
Ladakh	Juniper	Juniperus semiglobosa	
Lakshadweep	Bread fruit	Artocarpus altilis	
Puducherry	Bael	Aegle marmelos	
