= Abantis venosa =

Veined paradise skipper

Scientific classification
- Domain: Eukaryota
- Kingdom: Animalia
- Phylum: Arthropoda
- Class: Insecta
- Order: Lepidoptera
- Family: Hesperiidae
- Genus: Abantis
- Species: A. venosa

Binomial name
- Abantis venosa Trimen, 1889

Synonyms
- Leucochitonea umvulensis Sharpe, 1890; Abantis plerotica Karsch, 1896; Abantis venosa f. fulva Evans, 1937; Abantis flava Evans, 1937

Species of butterfly

Abantis venosa, the veined skipper or veined paradise skipper, is a butterfly of the family Hesperiidae. It is found in Zululand, Eswatini, Transvaal, Zimbabwe, Kenya and Uganda.

The wingspan is 36–41 mm for males and 35–45 mm for females. Adults are on wing year-round with peaks in late summer from February to April and in spring from August to November.

The larvae feed on Pterocarpus rotundifolius and Pterocarpus brenanii.
