= Juniperus intermedia =

Juniperus intermedia can refer to:

- Juniperus intermedia Drobow, a synonym of Juniperus semiglobosa Regel
- Juniperus intermedia Schur, a synonym of Juniperus communis var. depressa Pursh
