= Bleeding Tree Folklore in Nigeria =

Folklore about trees with red sap

In Nigeria, some trees are known as bleeding trees because they produce red sap that looks like blood. In places like Ota in Ogun State and Okrika in Rivers State, these trees are considered sacred and are believed to have spiritual or supernatural powers.

== Folklore and cultural beliefs ==
In several communities across Nigeria, bleeding trees and other sacred trees hold deep cultural and spiritual significance. Based on local tales, these trees are believed to house ancestral spirits or deities, and cutting them is thought to bring misfortune.

In Okrika, Rivers State, bleeding trees are linked to the spirit world, with some residents believing the sap symbolizes the blood of disturbed ancestors. Similarly, in Ota, Ogun State, the phenomenon is associated with protective spirits who guard the community. Community elders often discourage cutting or harming these trees to avoid angering the spirits or inviting bad luck.

Bleeding trees are also integrated into traditional healing practices. Some believe that the red sap has medicinal properties and is used to treat blood-related ailments. Ritual offerings and prayers are sometimes conducted near these trees to seek blessings or protection.

== Scientific explanation ==
The bleeding effect in these trees can be explained by biological processes. Certain tree species produce red or reddish-brown sap as a natural defense mechanism against insects and infections. Notable examples include:

Pterocarpus angolensis (bloodwood tree): Native to parts of Africa, this tree exudes a deep red sap when cut, which has led to many cultural interpretations.

Corymbia opaca (red bloodwood tree): Found primarily in Australia, this tree produces a similar red resin that has ritualistic and medicinal uses among Indigenous groups. The red sap results from tannins and other pigments released by the tree’s vascular system when the bark is damaged. Despite the scientific explanation, local communities often continue to regard the phenomenon as mystical.
