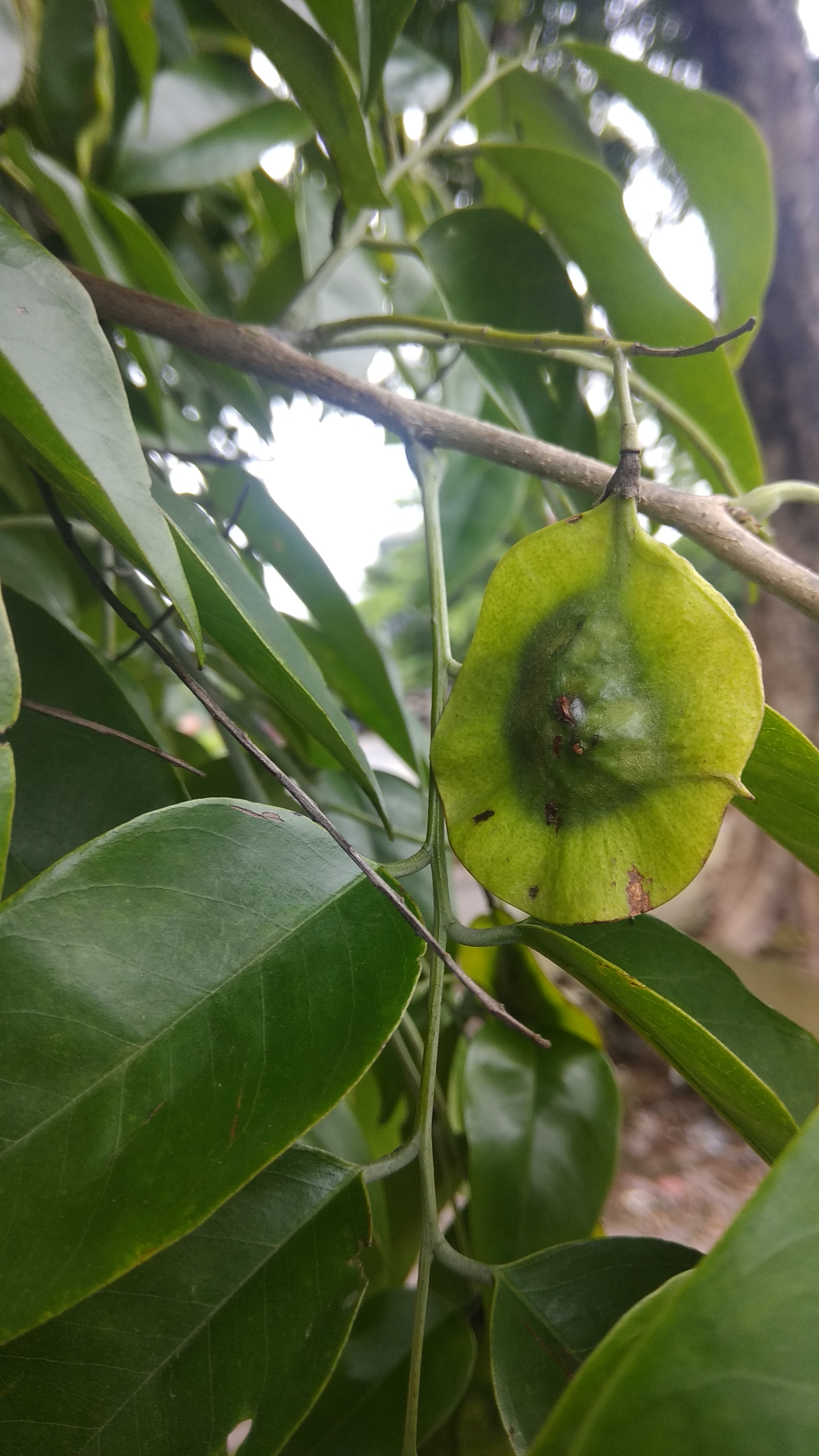
- Pterocarpus santalinus seed pods

Scientific classification
- Kingdom: Plantae
- Clade: Tracheophytes
- Clade: Angiosperms
- Clade: Eudicots
- Clade: Rosids
- Order: Fabales
- Family: Fabaceae
- Subfamily: Faboideae
- Tribe: Dalbergieae
- Genus: Pterocarpus; Jacq. (1763), nom. cons.

Species
- See text

Synonyms
- Amphymenium Kunth (1824); Ancylocalyx Tul. (1843); Echinodiscus Benth. (1837); Etaballia Benth. (1840); Griselinia Scop. (1777), nom. superfl.; Lingoum Adans. (1763), nom. superfl.; Malaparius Rumph. ex Bosc (1803); Moutouchi Aubl. (1775); Nephraea Hassk. (1844); Nephrea Noronha (1790), nom. nud.; Phellocarpus Benth. (1837); Pterocarpos St.-Lag. (1880); Pterocarpus L. (1754), nom. rej.; Weinreichia Rchb. (1828)

= Pterocarpus =

Genus of legumes

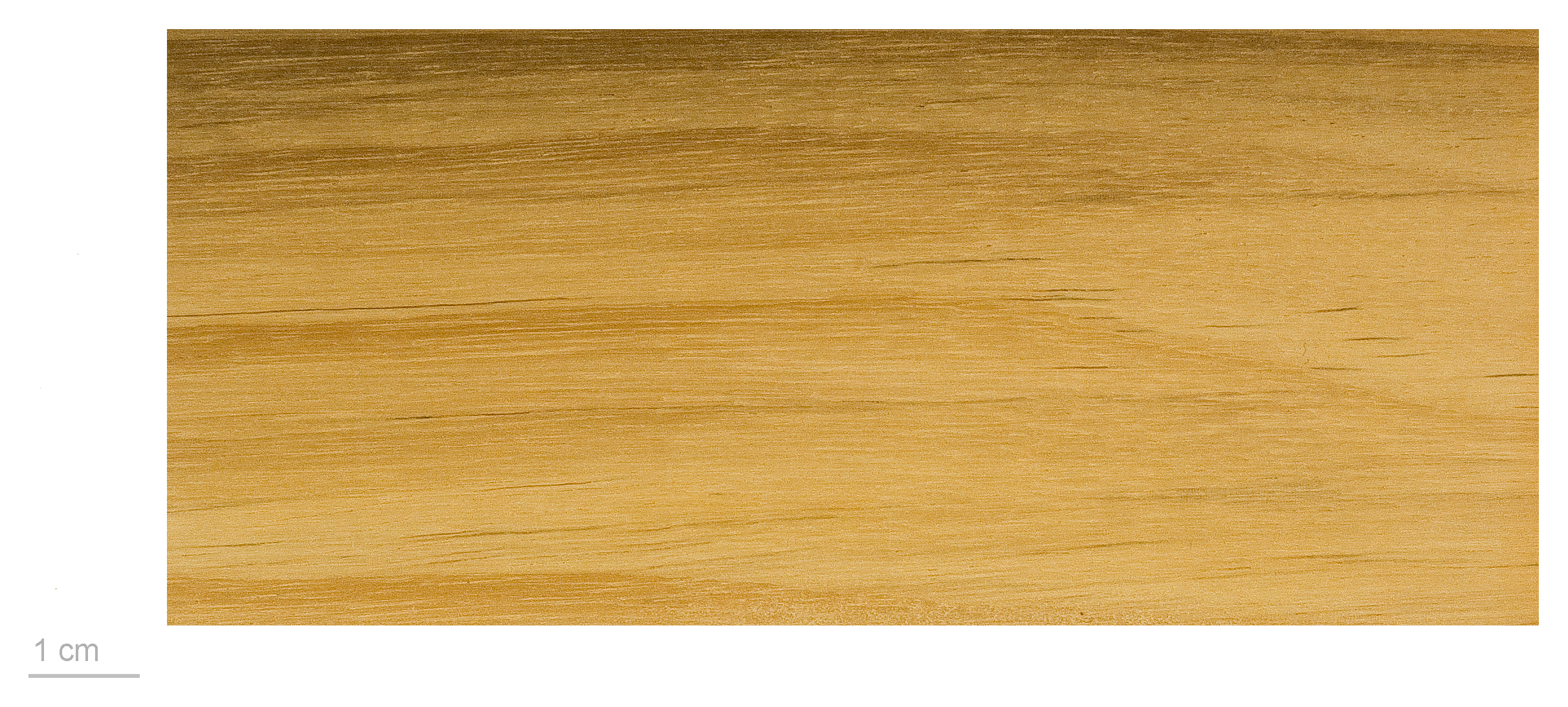
Wood of P. officinalis

Pterocarpus is a pantropical tree genus in the Fabaceae family. It belongs to the subfamily Faboideae, and was recently assigned to the informal monophyletic Pterocarpus clade within the Dalbergieae. Most species of Pterocarpus yield valuable timber traded as padauk (or padouk), usually pronounced /pəˈduːk/ or /ˈpædˌoʊk/; other common names are Mukwa (Africa) or Narra (Asia).

The West African species may be traded as African rosewood. P. santalinus also yields the most precious red sandalwood in China known as Zitan. The wood from the narra tree (P. indicus) and the Burmese padauk tree (P. macrocarpus) is marketed as amboyna when it has grown in the burl form. The scientific name is Latinized Ancient Greek and means "wing fruit", referring to the unusual shape of the seed pods in this genus.

== Uses ==
Padauk wood is obtained from several species of Pterocarpus. All padauks are of African or Asian origin. Padauks are valued for their toughness, stability in use, and decorativeness, most having a reddish wood. Most Pterocarpus woods contain either water- or alcohol-soluble substances and can be used as dyes.

The padauk found most often is African padauk from P. soyauxii which, when freshly cut, is a very bright red/orange but when exposed to sunlight fades over time to a warm brown. Its colour makes it a favourite among woodworkers. Burmese padauk (ပိတောက်) is P. macrocarpus while Andaman padauk is P. dalbergioides. Padauks can be confused with true rosewoods to which they are somewhat related, but as a general rule padauks are coarser and less decorative in figure. Like rosewood, padauk is sometimes used to make xylophone, organ and marimba keys, and guitars. It is an important material in traditional Chinese furniture.

African padauk veneer

Some padauks, e.g. P. soyauxii, are used as herbal medicines, for example to treat skin parasites and fungal infections. Padauk wood is also used as a spice, for example in Swedish soused herring.

== Chemistry ==
Pterocarpin is a pterocarpan found in Pterocarpus spp.

== Species ==
A total of 35 species is currently accepted:

- Pterocarpus acapulcensis Rose
- Pterocarpus albopubescens Hauman
- Pterocarpus amazonum (Benth.) Amshoff
- Pterocarpus angolensis DC.—kiaat
- Pterocarpus antunesii (Taub.) Harms
- Pterocarpus brenanii Barbosa & Torre
- Pterocarpus claessensii De Wild.
- Pterocarpus dalbergioides DC.—Andaman padauk, Andaman redwood, East Indian mahogany
- Pterocarpus dubius (Kunth) Spreng. – Venezuela, Guyana, and northern Brazil
- Pterocarpus echinatus Pers.^{[Note 1]}
- Pterocarpus erinaceus Poir.—muninga, barwood, vène
- Pterocarpus gilletii De Wild.
- Pterocarpus hockii De Wild.
- Pterocarpus homblei De Wild.
- Pterocarpus indicus Willd.—Pashu padauk, Malay padauk, New Guinea rosewood
- Pterocarpus lucens Guill. & Perr.
- Pterocarpus macrocarpus Kurz—Burmese padauk
- Pterocarpus marsupium Roxb.—Indian kino, Malabar kino, benga, bijiayasal (w Nepal), venkai
- Pterocarpus mildbraedii Harms
- Pterocarpus mutondo De Wild.
- Pterocarpus officinalis Jacq.
- Pterocarpus orbiculatus DC.
- Pterocarpus osun Craib
- Pterocarpus rohrii Vahl
- Pterocarpus rotundifolius (Sond.) Druce
  - subsp. polyanthus (Harms) Mendonça & E. P. Sousa
    - var. martinii (Dunkley) Mendonça & E. P. Sousa
    - var. polyanthus (Harms) Mendonça & E. P. Sousa
  - subsp. rotundifolius (Sond.) Druce
- Pterocarpus santalinoides DC.—mututi
- Pterocarpus santalinus L. f.—red sandalwood, red sanders
- Pterocarpus soyauxii Taub.—African padauk, African coralwood
- Pterocarpus ternatus Rizzini
- Pterocarpus tessmannii Harms
- Pterocarpus tinctorius Welw.
- Pterocarpus velutinus De Wild.
- Pterocarpus villosus (Benth.) Benth.
- Pterocarpus violaceus Vogel
- Pterocarpus zehntneri Harms
- Pterocarpus zenkeri Harms

== Notes ==
^{1} Some sources treat P. echinatus as a synonym of P. indicus.
