= Pterocarpus soyauxii =

Scientific classification
- Kingdom: Plantae
- Clade: Tracheophytes
- Clade: Angiosperms
- Clade: Eudicots
- Clade: Rosids
- Order: Fabales
- Family: Fabaceae
- Subfamily: Faboideae
- Genus: Pterocarpus
- Species: P. soyauxii

Binomial name
- Pterocarpus soyauxii Taub.

Species of legume

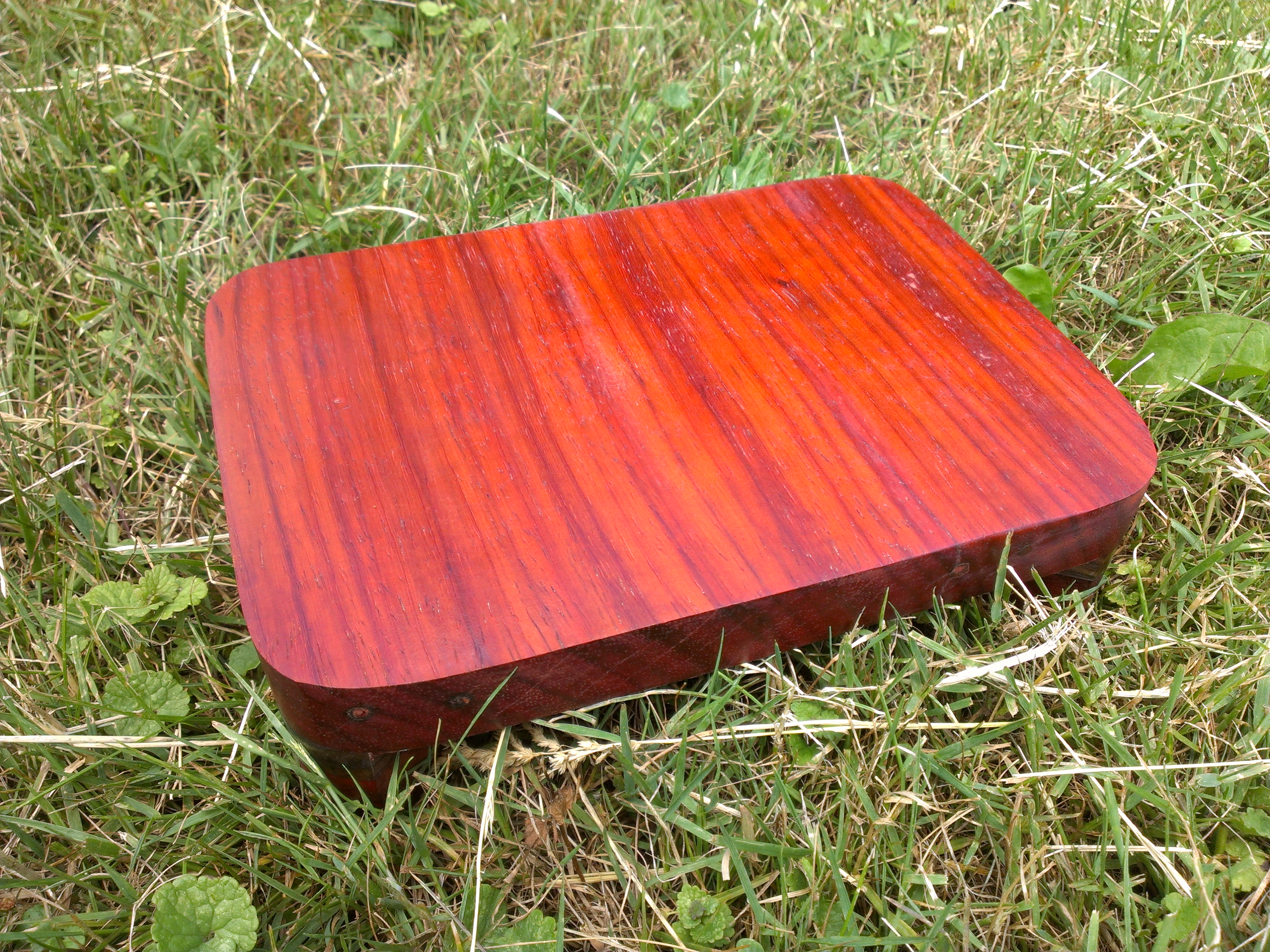
A bonsai stand made from African padauk wood

Pterocarpus soyauxii, the African padauk or African coralwood, is a species of Pterocarpus in the family Fabaceae, native to central and tropical west Africa, from Nigeria east to Congo-Kinshasa and south to Angola.

It is a tree growing to 27–34 m tall, with a trunk diameter up to 1 m with flaky reddish-grey bark. The leaves are pinnate, with 11–13 leaflets. The flowers are produced in panicles. The fruit is a thorny pod 6–9 cm long, which does not split open at maturity.

== Uses ==
The leaves are edible, and contain large amounts of vitamin C; they are eaten as a leaf vegetable.

Bark extracts are used in herbal medicine to treat skin parasites and fungal infections.

The wood is valuable; it is very durable, red at first, becoming purplish-brown on exposure to light, with a density of 0.79 g/cm^{3}. It is resistant to termites. It is valued for making drums in Africa due to its tonal resonance. The wood is also favored for its use in stringed instruments (namely acoustic and electric guitars) for its tonal attributes and durability.

Dust from the wood produced during wood processing can cause dermatitis in some people.

Native African names include Kisese (Congo), Mbel (Cameroon), Mukula, N'gula (Zaire), and Tacula (Angola).
