= Pterocarpus lucens =

Scientific classification
- Kingdom: Plantae
- Clade: Embryophytes
- Clade: Tracheophytes
- Clade: Angiosperms
- Clade: Eudicots
- Clade: Rosids
- Order: Fabales
- Family: Fabaceae
- Subfamily: Faboideae
- Genus: Pterocarpus
- Species: P. lucens

Binomial name
- Pterocarpus lucens Lepr. ex Guill. & Perr.

Species of legume

Pterocarpus lucens is a tree species native to the Sahelian region of West Africa.

It is used for fuel wood, for treatment of diarrhea and other medicinal purposes, as a woodworking material, and for charcoal. It has several common names, including dabakalan (Bambara), Baro (Malinké), Dakolokué (Bobofing), Babangué (Sarakolé), Tjami (Fula), and Bèbèblè (Dogon).
