= Pterocarpus dubius =

Conservation status
- Least Concern (IUCN 3.1)

Scientific classification
- Kingdom: Plantae
- Clade: Tracheophytes
- Clade: Angiosperms
- Clade: Eudicots
- Clade: Rosids
- Order: Fabales
- Family: Fabaceae
- Subfamily: Faboideae
- Tribe: Dalbergieae
- Genus: Pterocarpus
- Species: P. dubius

Binomial name
- Pterocarpus dubius (Kunth) Spreng. (1827)

Synonyms
- Ecastaphyllum dubium Kunth (1824); Etaballia dubia (Kunth) Rudd in Phytologia 20: 427 (1970); Etaballia guianensis Benth. (1840)

Genus of legumes

Pterocarpus dubius is a species of flowering plant in the family Fabaceae native to Venezuela, Guyana, and northern Brazil in northern South America.

Pterocarpus dubius is a tree which grows up to 30 meters tall. It grows in semi-deciduous and evergreen lowland tropical forests.

It belongs to the subfamily Faboideae. It was formerly classed as the sole species in genus Etaballia.
