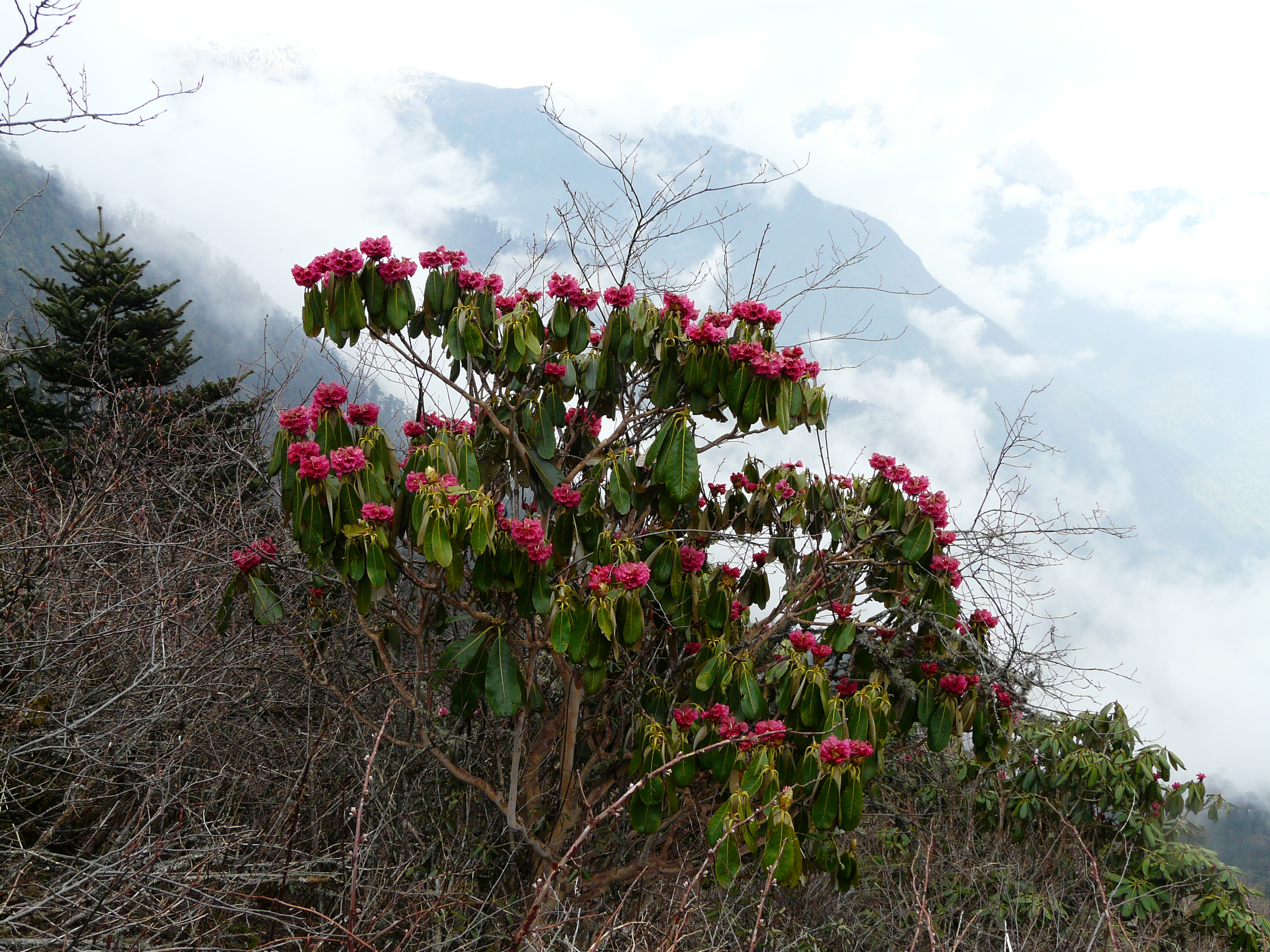

Scientific classification
- Kingdom: Plantae
- Clade: Tracheophytes
- Clade: Angiosperms
- Clade: Eudicots
- Clade: Asterids
- Order: Ericales
- Family: Ericaceae
- Genus: Rhododendron
- Species: R. niveum

Binomial name
- Rhododendron niveum Hook.f.

= Rhododendron niveum =

Species of plant

Rhododendron niveum (Chinese: 西藏毛脉杜鹃) is a rhododendron species native to northeastern India (including Sikkim), Bhutan, and southern Tibet in China, where it grows at altitudes of 2,600–3,500 m (8,500–11,500 ft). It is an evergreen shrub or small tree that grows to 2–6 m (6.6–19.7 ft) in height, with leathery leaves that are oblanceolate to elliptic, 8.5–11 by 3.6–4.6 cm in size. When young the leaves are covered in a white indumentum, which falls off the upper surface but remains on the underside. The flowers are an intense magenta or lilac, and held in a compact ball above the leaves.

== Cultural depictions ==
Rhododendron niveum is the state tree of the Indian state of Sikkim.
