= Pterocarpus osun =

Conservation status
- Least Concern (IUCN 3.1)

Scientific classification
- Kingdom: Plantae
- Clade: Tracheophytes
- Clade: Angiosperms
- Clade: Eudicots
- Clade: Rosids
- Order: Fabales
- Family: Fabaceae
- Subfamily: Faboideae
- Genus: Pterocarpus
- Species: P. osun

Binomial name
- Pterocarpus osun Craib (1910)

Species of legume

Pterocarpus osun is a species of tree which occurs primarily in the wet tropical biome of West Central Africa.
