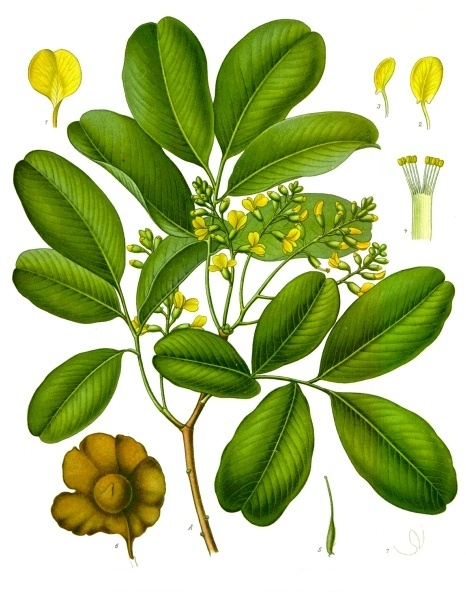

Conservation status
- Near Threatened (IUCN 3.1)

Scientific classification
- Kingdom: Plantae
- Clade: Tracheophytes
- Clade: Angiosperms
- Clade: Eudicots
- Clade: Rosids
- Order: Fabales
- Family: Fabaceae
- Subfamily: Faboideae
- Genus: Pterocarpus
- Species: P. marsupium

Binomial name
- Pterocarpus marsupium Roxburgh

Synonyms
- Pterocarpus marsupium f. acuminata (Prain) Prain; Pterocarpus marsupium f. acuta Prain; Pterocarpus marsupium f. biloba (Roxb. ex G. Don) Prain

= Pterocarpus marsupium =

Species of legumelam

Pterocarpus marsupium, also known as Malabar kino or Indian kino, is a medium-to-large, deciduous tree that can grow up to 31 m (102 ft) tall. It is native to India (where it occurs in parts of the Western Ghats in the Karnataka-Kerala region and in the forests of Central India), Nepal, and Sri Lanka.

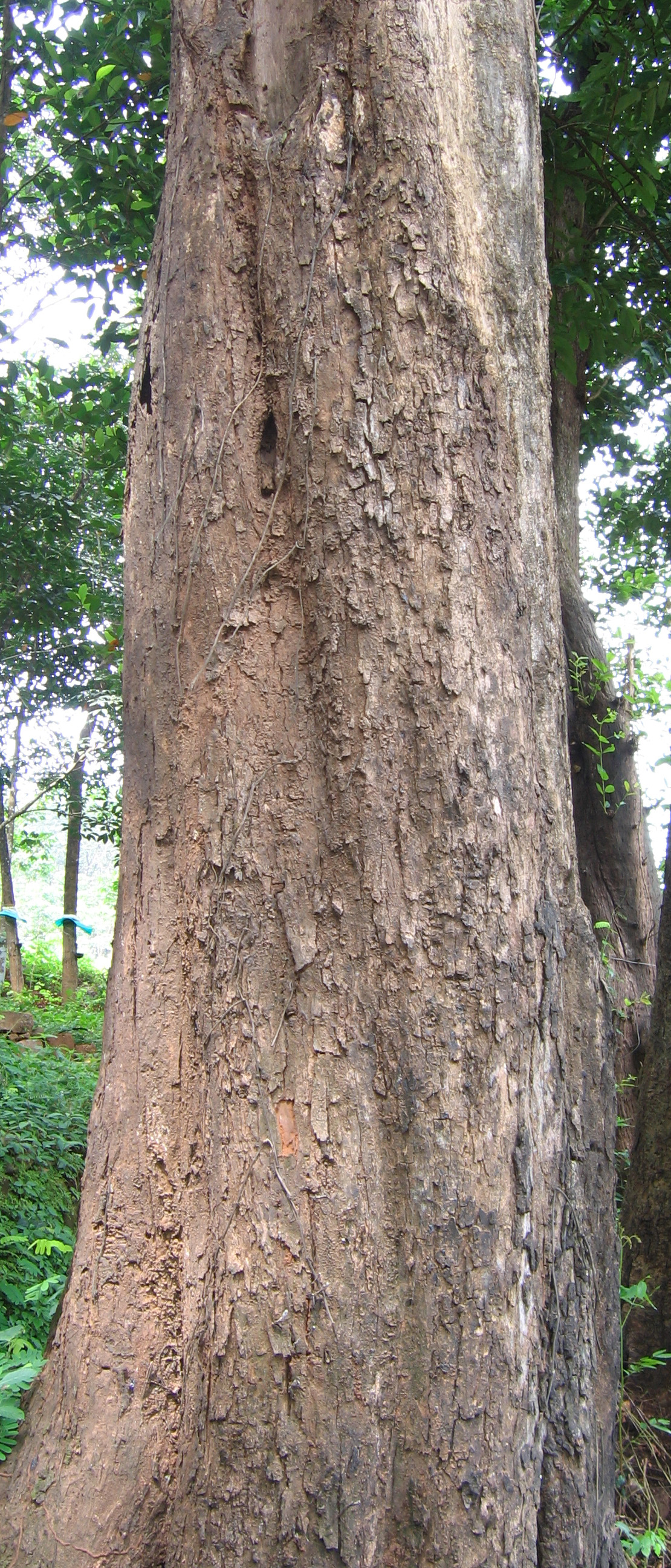
Pterocarpus marsupium bark

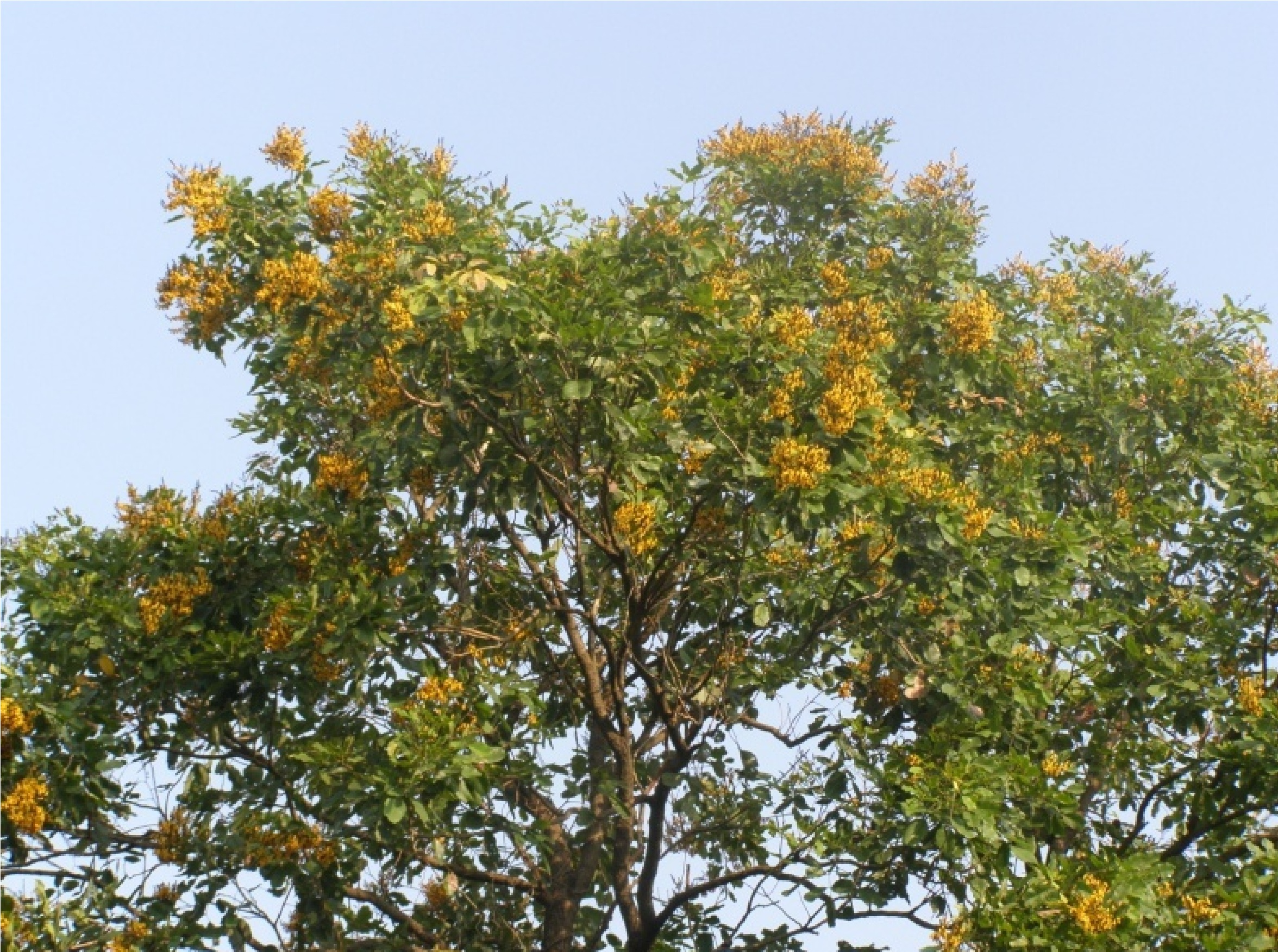
Pterocarpus marsupium tree

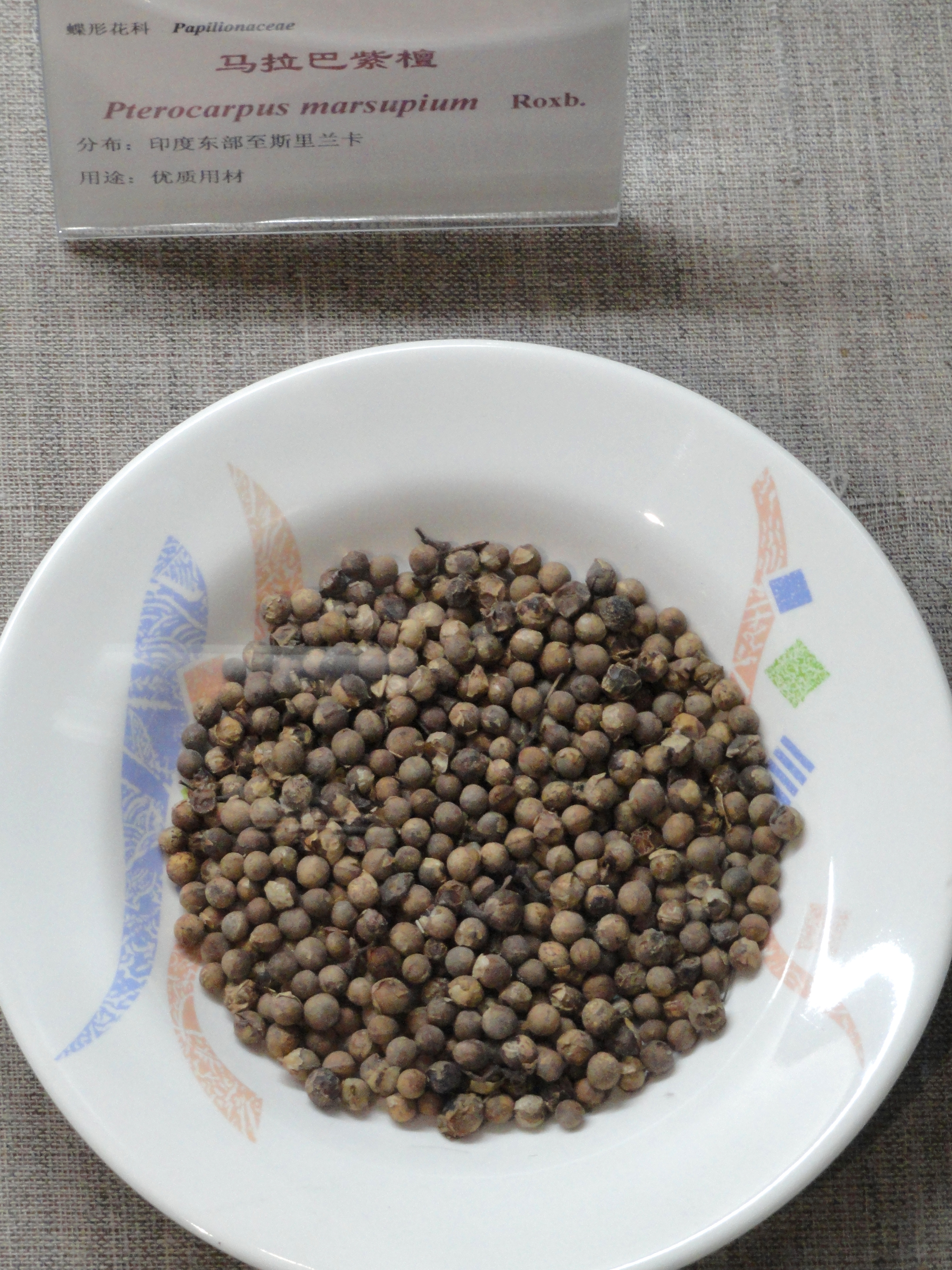
Pterocarpus marsupium seeds (Kunming Botanical Garden)

== Phytochemistry ==
Pterocarpus marsupium contains 2,3,6-trimethyl-1,4-naphthoquinone (also called 2,3,6-trimethylnaphthalene-1,4-dione or TM-NQ), which, in vitro, is a reversible monoamine oxidase inhibitor occurring in tobacco leaf, and may cause skin, eye and respiratory irritation.
