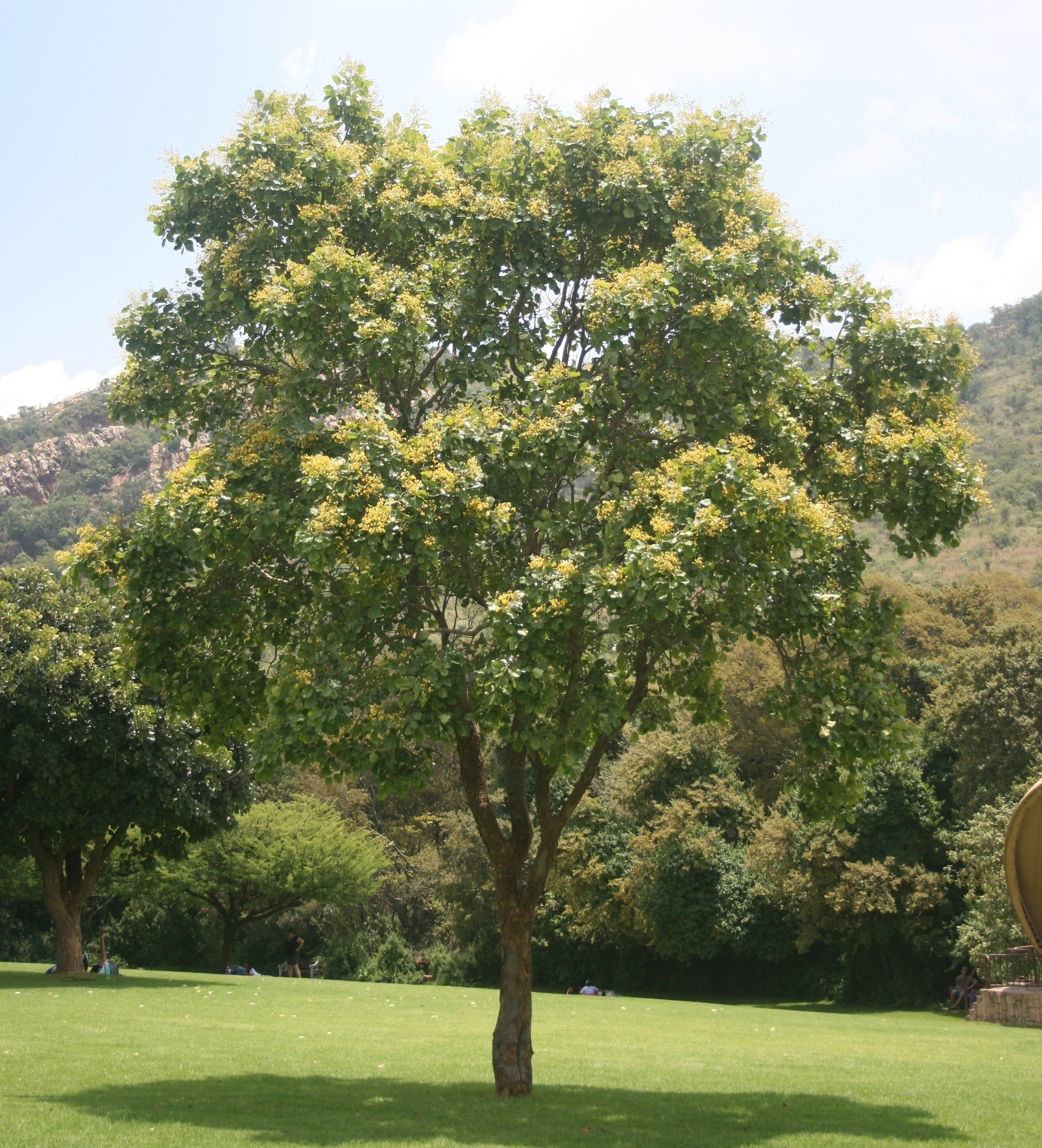

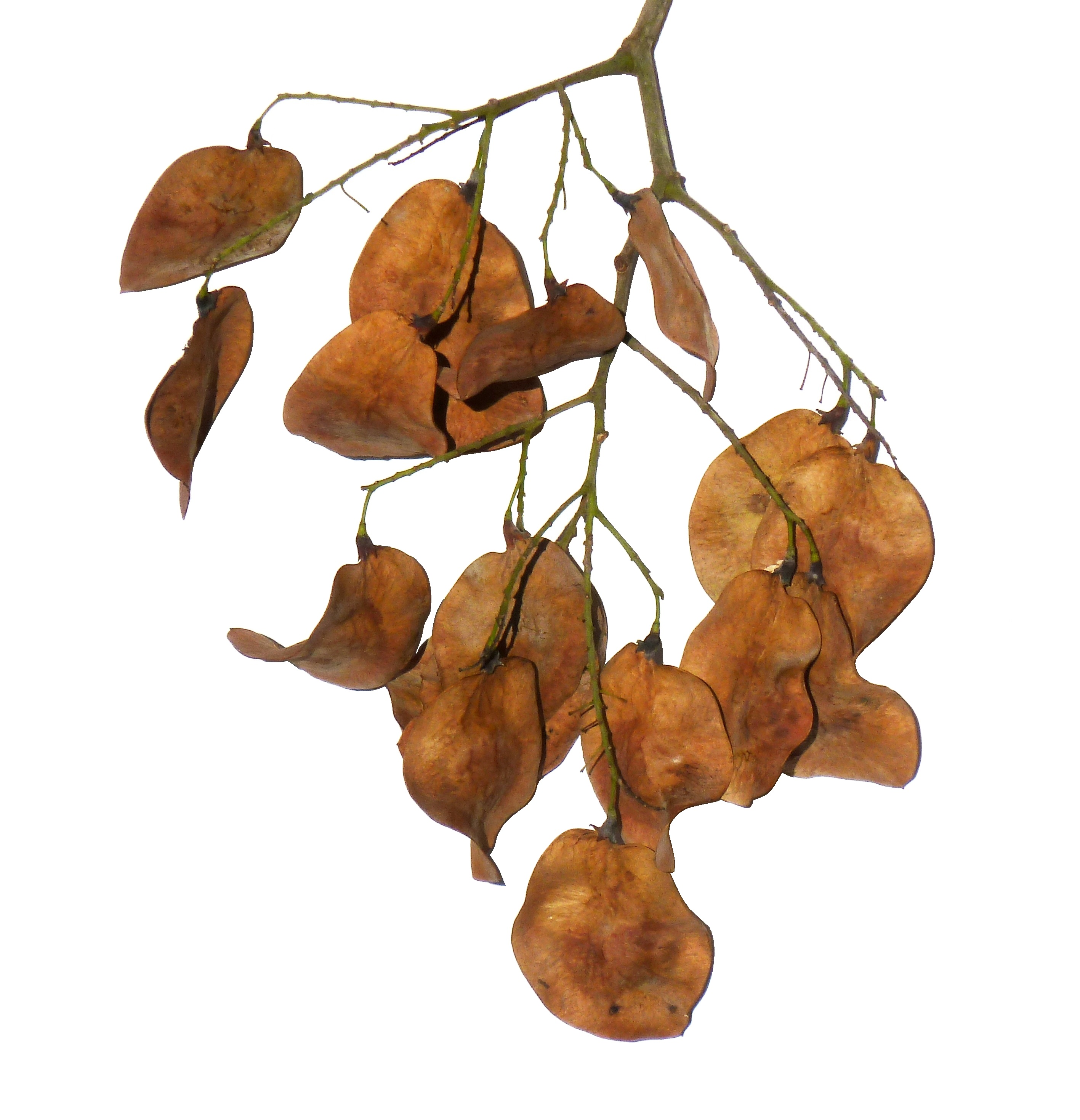
- Habit and dry infructescences

Scientific classification
- Kingdom: Plantae
- Clade: Tracheophytes
- Clade: Angiosperms
- Clade: Eudicots
- Clade: Rosids
- Order: Fabales
- Family: Fabaceae
- Subfamily: Faboideae
- Genus: Pterocarpus
- Species: P. rotundifolius

Binomial name
- Pterocarpus rotundifolius (Sond.) Druce

= Pterocarpus rotundifolius =

Round-leaved bloodwood

Species of legume

Pterocarpus rotundifolius, the round-leaved bloodwood, is a species of fabaceous tree that is native to mesic and well-watered woodlands of Africa south of the equator.

== Subspecies ==
Up to three subspecies are recognized, but specimens with intermediate characteristics are common.

- Pterocarpus rotundifolius subsp. rotundifolius
- Pterocarpus rotundifolius subsp. martinii (Dunkley) Mend. & Sousa
- Pterocarpus rotundifolius subsp. polyanthus (Harms) Mendonca & Sousa

== Gallery ==
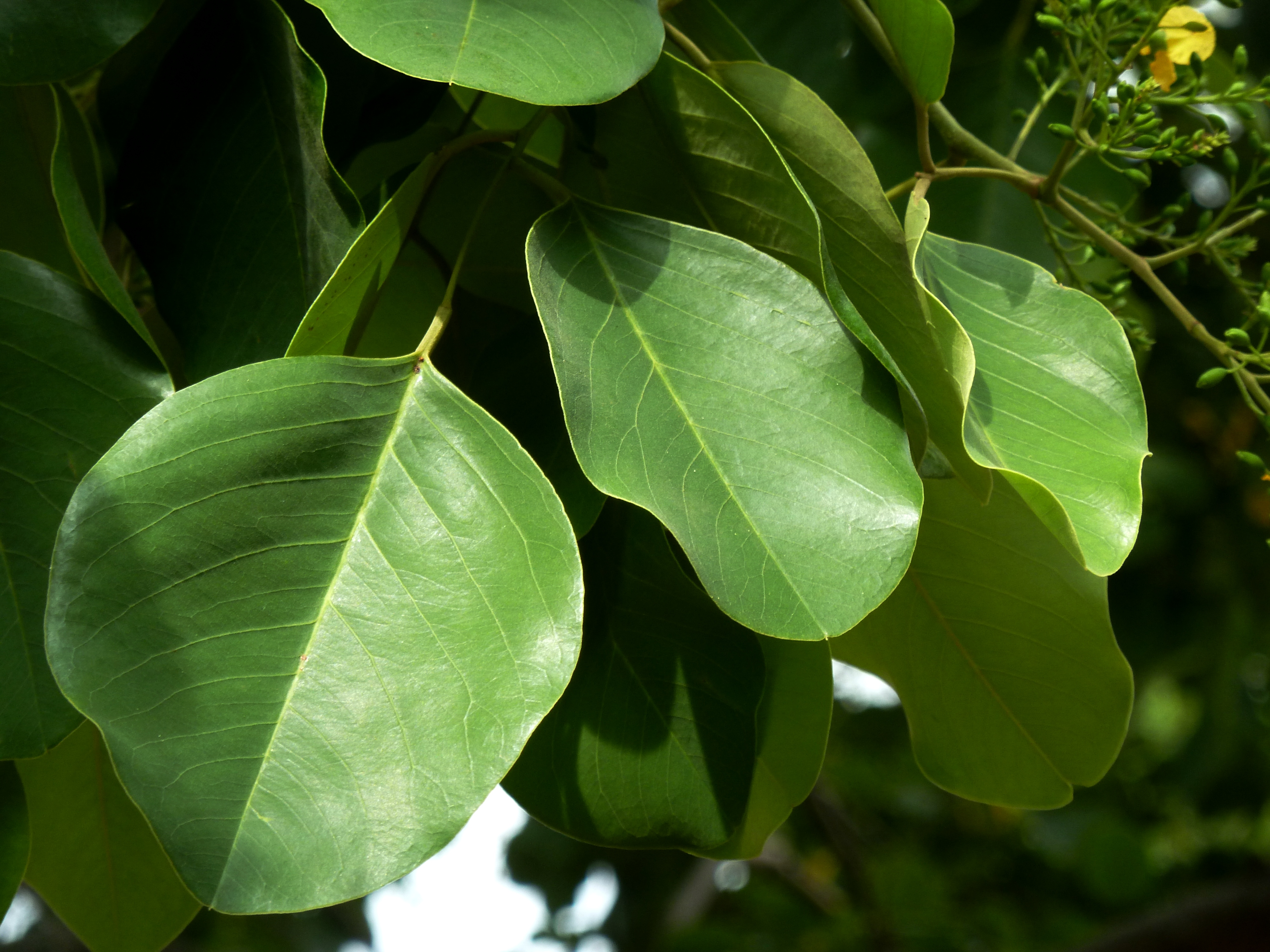
rounded leaflets

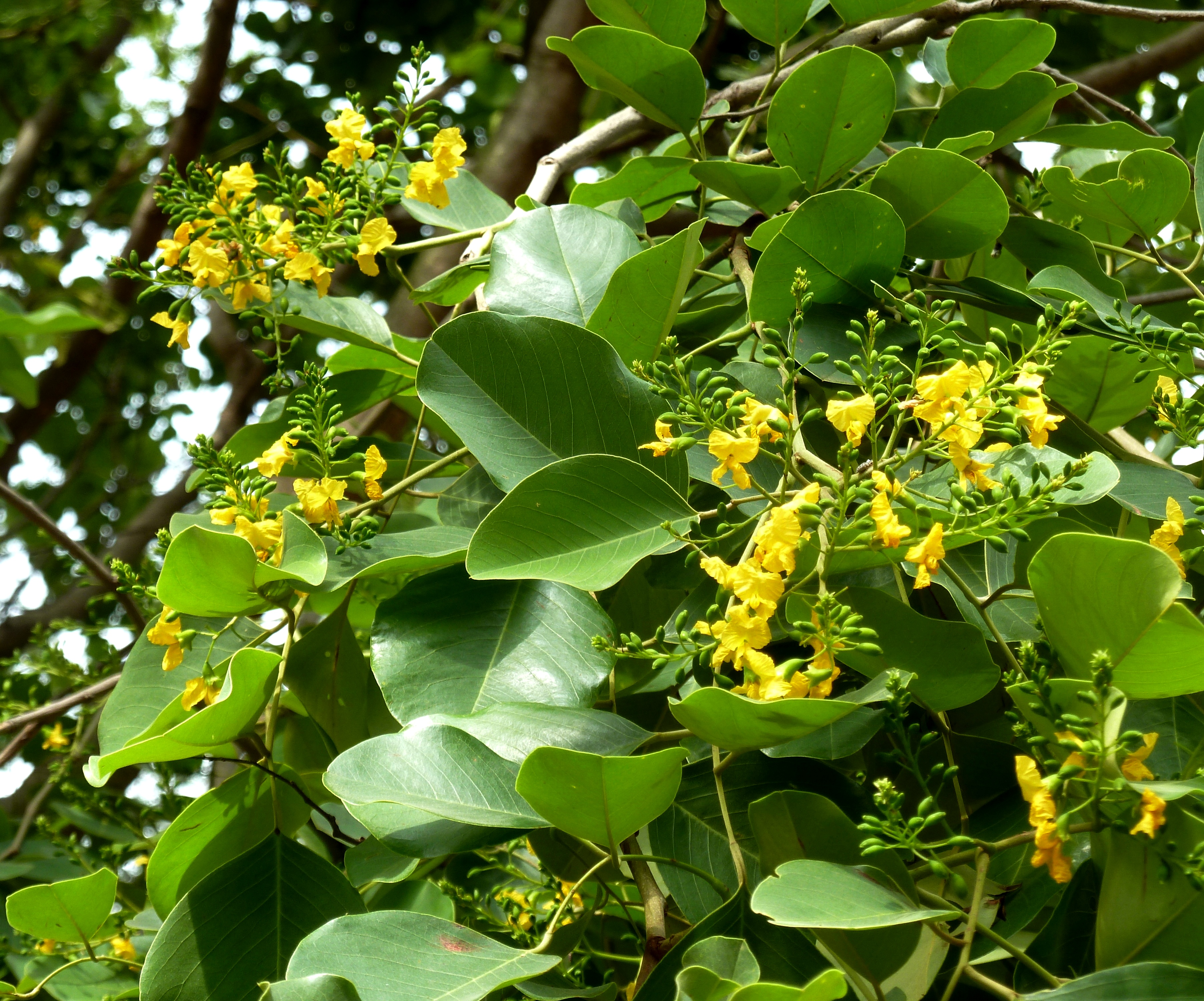
Foliage and inflorescences with buds and flowers

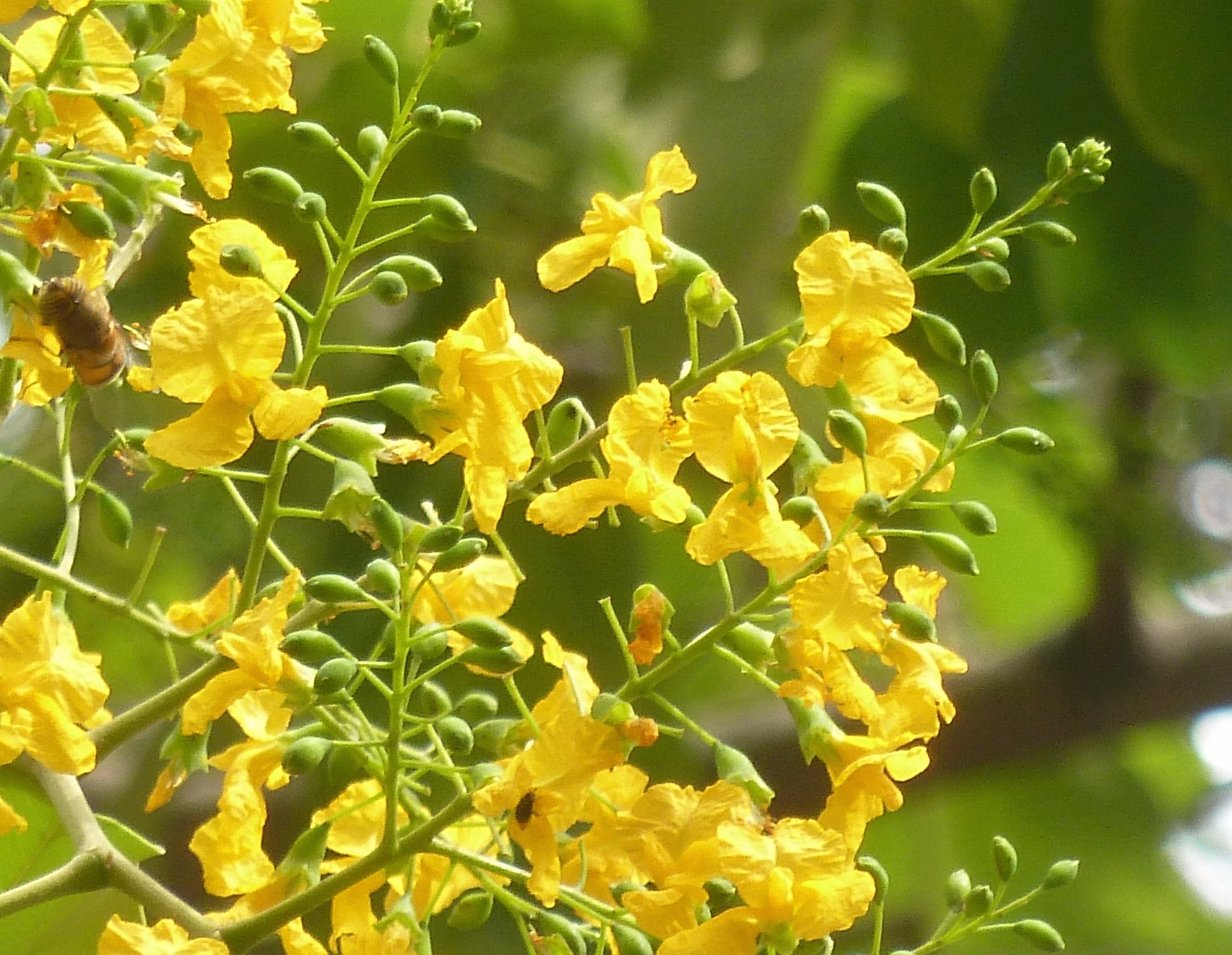
flowers

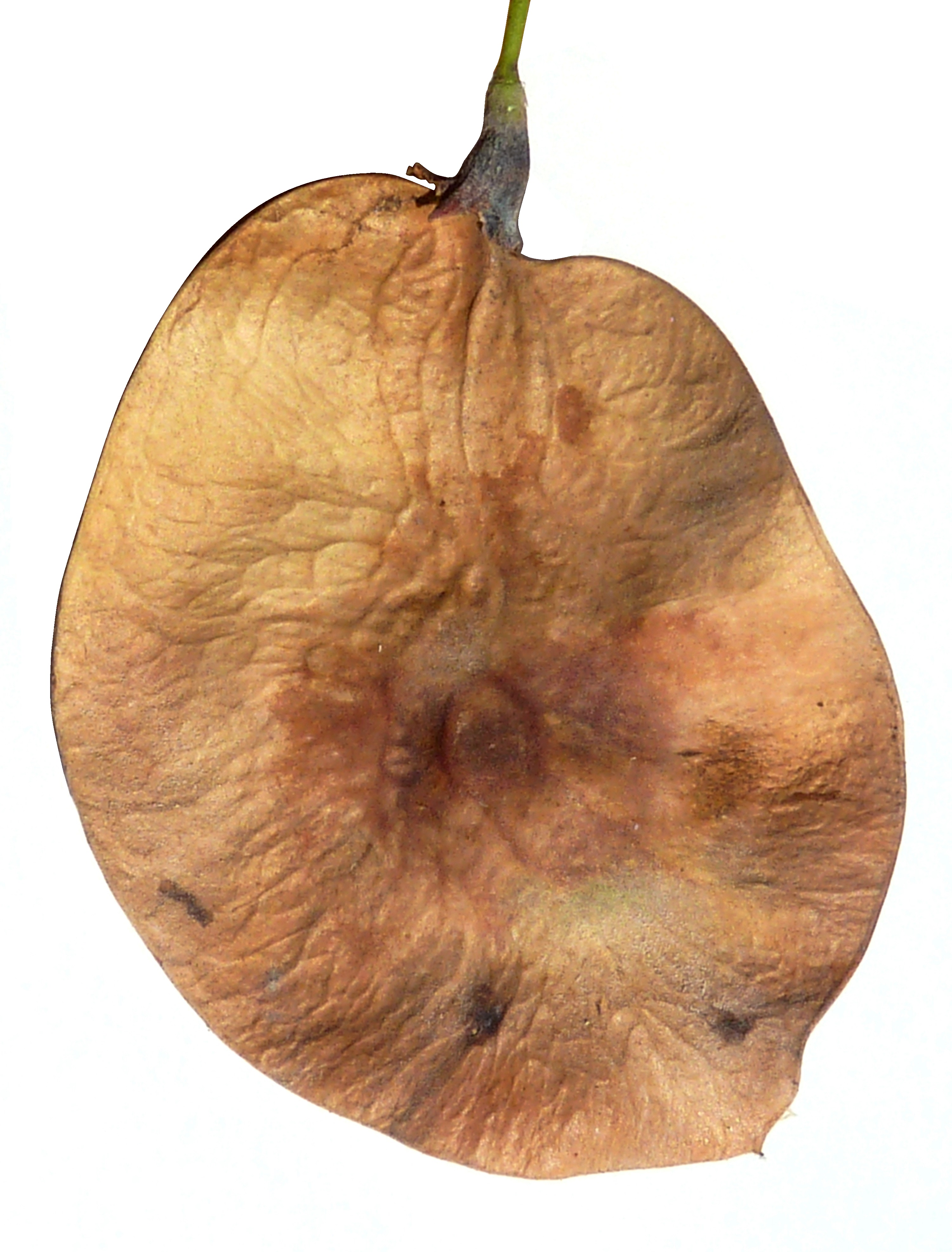
shape of single pod
