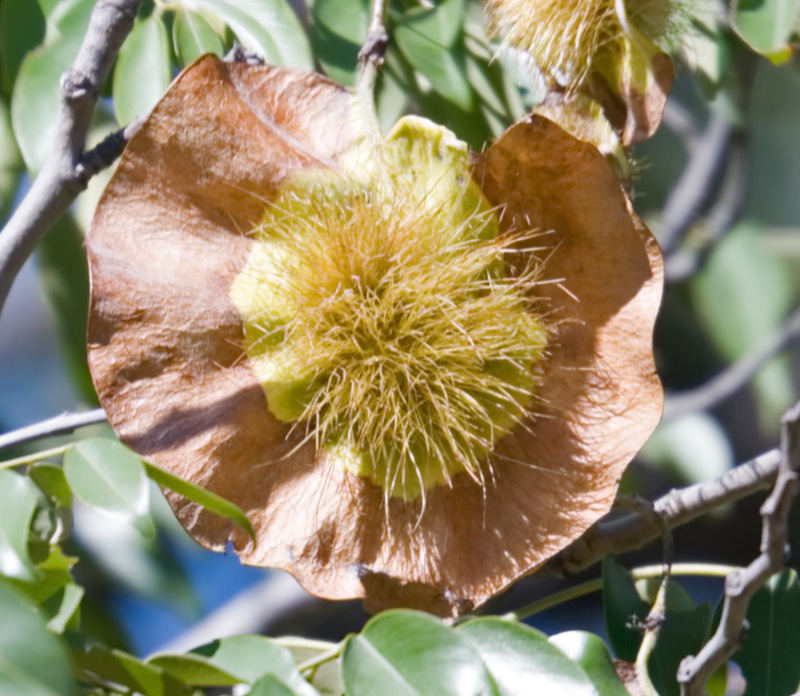
- Kiaat seed in autumn, photographed in Matabeleland South, Zimbabwe
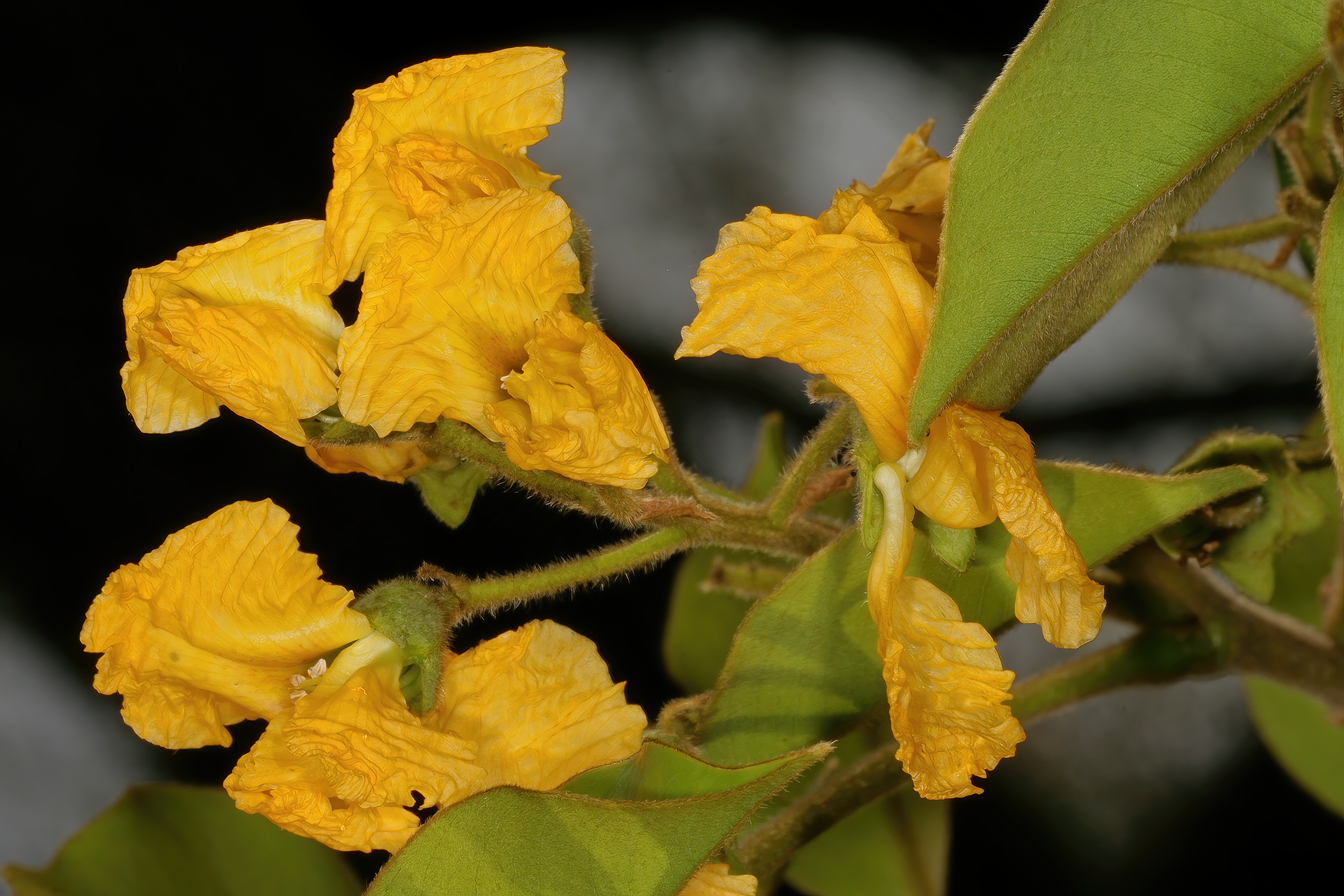
- Yellow flowers

Conservation status
- Least Concern (IUCN 3.1)

Scientific classification
- Kingdom: Plantae
- Clade: Tracheophytes
- Clade: Angiosperms
- Clade: Eudicots
- Clade: Rosids
- Order: Fabales
- Family: Fabaceae
- Subfamily: Faboideae
- Clade: Dalbergioids
- Tribe: Dalbergieae
- Genus: Pterocarpus
- Species: P. angolensis

Binomial name
- Pterocarpus angolensis DC.

= Pterocarpus angolensis =

Species of tree

Pterocarpus angolensis (African teak, wild teak, Portuguese: Girassonde, Afrikaans: Kiaat, Sotho: Morôtô, Tswana: Mokwa, Venda: Mutondo, Shona: Mukwa, Tsonga: Mvhangase, Ndebele: Umvangazi, Shona: Mubvamaropa, Zulu: Umvangazi) is a species of Pterocarpus native to southern Africa, in Angola, Mozambique, Namibia, South Africa, Eswatini, Tanzania, Democratic Republic of the Congo, Zimbabwe, and Zambia. It is a protected tree in South Africa. The name Kiaat, although Afrikaans, is sometimes used outside South Africa as well. In Zimbabwe, depending on the region, it is known as Mukwa (which it is also called in Zambia) or Mubvamaropa.

== Description ==
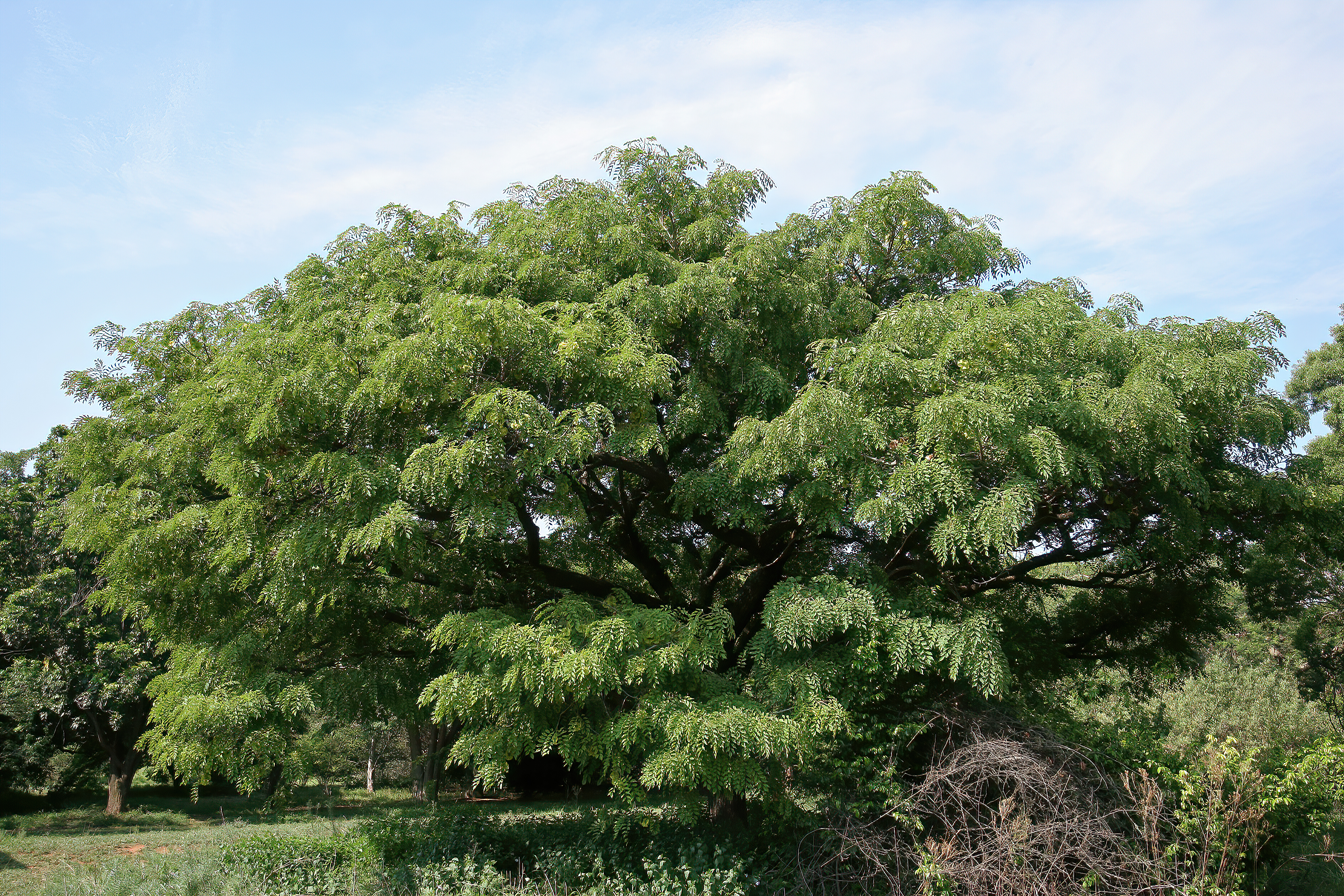
Kiaat tree at the Pretoria National Botanical Garden

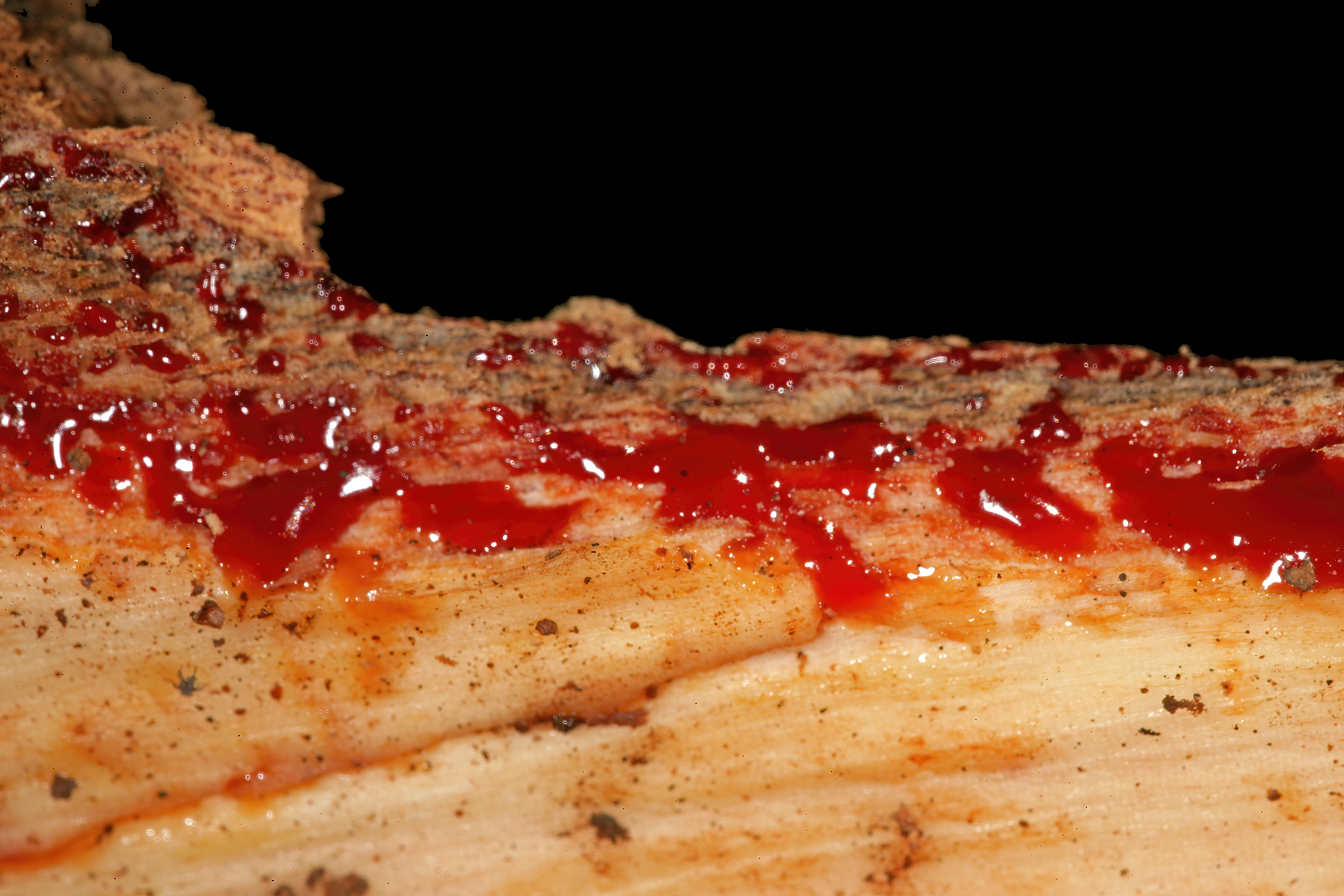
Red blood-like sap

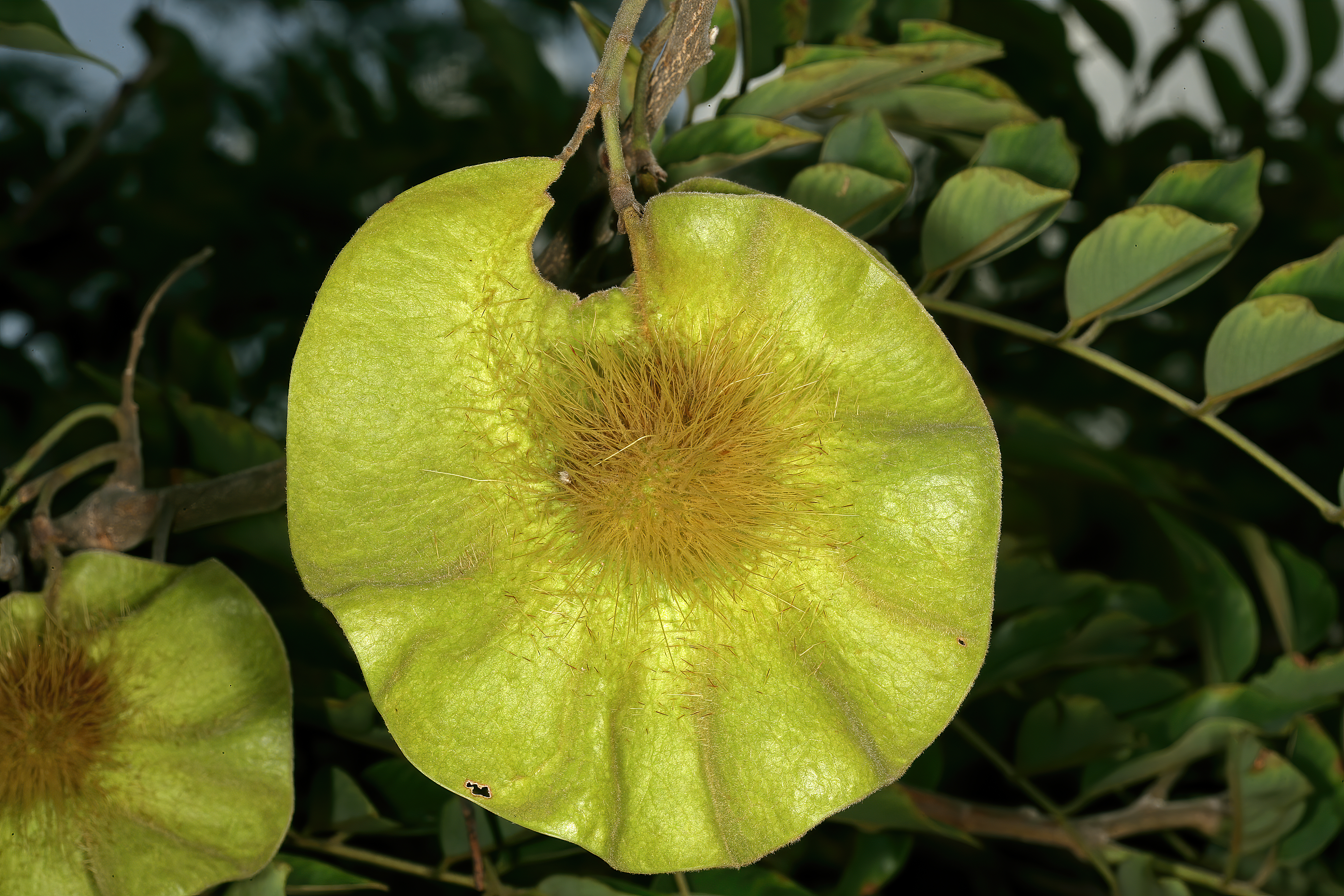
Developing pod

It is a deciduous tree usually growing to 16 m tall, with dark brown bark and a high, wide-crowned canopy of shiny compound leaves. In favoured wetter locations the trees are typically about 18–19 m tall. The leaves appear at the time of the flowers or shortly afterwards. They are alternate, deep green, imparipinnate, with 11-19 subopposite to alternate leaflets, the leaflets 2.5–7 cm long and 2–4.5 cm broad. It produces an abundance of scented, orange-yellow flowers in panicles 10–20 cm long; flowering is in the spring. In southern Africa, this is usually just at the end of the dry season, often about mid-October. The pod is 2–3 cm diameter, surrounded by a circular wing 8–12 cm diameter, reminiscent of a brown fried egg, and containing a single seed. This brown papery and spiky seed pod stays on long after the leaves have fallen. In poorly drained locations, the tree can still grow but it becomes more open in shape with leaves on the end of long branches - a 'stag-headed' appearance. It is referred to as a blood wood tree: when it is cut, it appears to bleed because of dark red sap.

== Ecology ==
Pterocarpus angolensis grows in southern and eastern Africa over a wide range of localities where there is a dry season contrasting with a wet season. It grows best where it is warm and free of frost. The soil type must be deep sandy soil or well drained rocky slopes where the rainfall is above 500 mm per year. It grows well in areas of open woodland such as the Mashonaland plateau in Zimbabwe and northern Kwazulu-Natal region of South Africa, where it assumes a broad crown with heavy branches, and is a pioneer species on woodland and forest margins. The best specimens grow in the seasonal closed woodland of central Mozambique and parts of Malawi, where they sometimes form pure stands.

Pterocarpus angolensis is fed upon by many animals that include the charaxes butterfly in larval state, squirrels, baboons and monkeys that feed on the seed pods, which have a diameter of about 12 cm. The elephant has been known to destroy P. angolensis by pushing it over.

== Uses ==
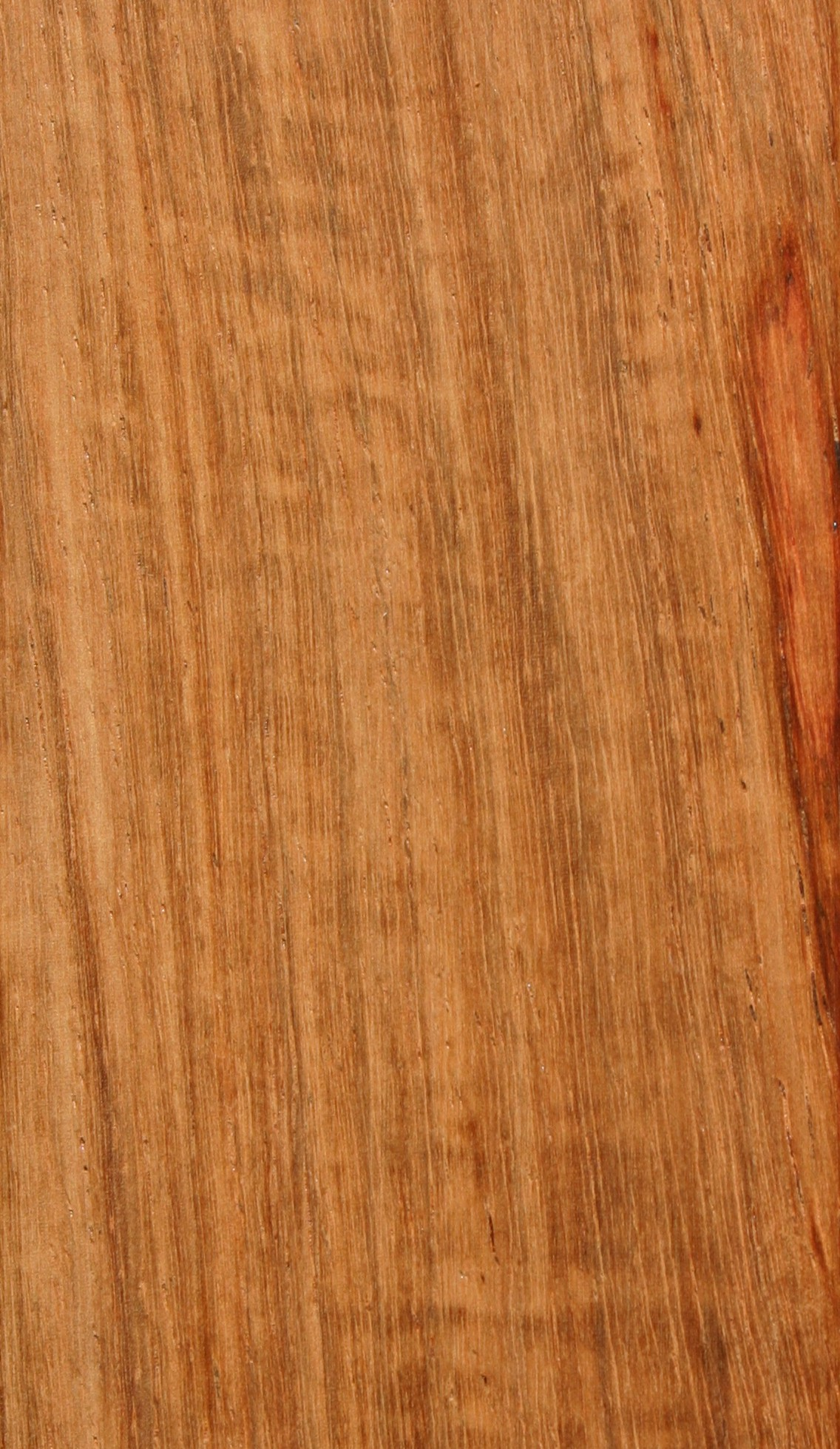
Reddish Kiaat plank

There are several uses for the wood of P. angolensis. The brown heartwood is resistant to borer and termite, is durable and has a pleasing spicy fragrance. The wood polishes well and is well known in tropical Africa as Mukwa when used to make good quality furniture that has an attractive light brownish-yellow colour. It can also be used for curios, and implements. Since the wood does not swell or shrink much it is great for canoe building. Furniture and curios are often made from the reddish sapwood. The colour of the sapwood is a result of the remarkable, dark red sap of the plant; an alternative name of Bloodwood rises from this. This wood also produces a rich, resonant sound and can be made into many different musical instruments. In Zimbabwe, the mbira is traditionally made from mukwa.

Methanolic extracts of the bark have been reported to have molluscicidal activity against some freshwater snails. The resemblance of the sap to blood has led to the belief in supposed magical healing powers concerning the blood. Because of all these reasons and that it is also fire resistant, P. angolensis is sometimes planted around the chief's enclosure to make a living fence.

== Cultural Importance ==
In places like Ota in Ogun State and Okrika in Rivers State in Nigeria, these trees are considered sacred and are believed to have spiritual or supernatural powers.
