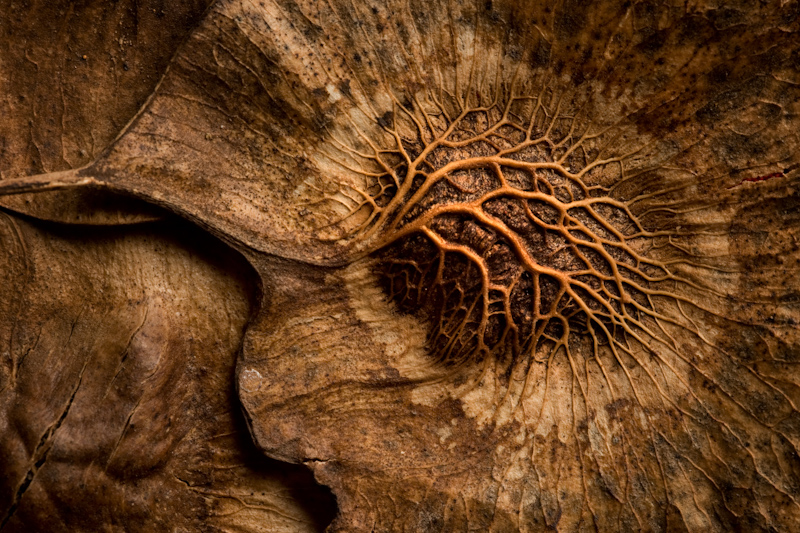

Conservation status
- Vulnerable (IUCN 3.1)

Scientific classification
- Kingdom: Plantae
- Clade: Tracheophytes
- Clade: Angiosperms
- Clade: Eudicots
- Clade: Rosids
- Order: Fabales
- Family: Fabaceae
- Subfamily: Faboideae
- Genus: Pterocarpus
- Species: P. dalbergioides

Binomial name
- Pterocarpus dalbergioides Roxb. ex DC.

= Pterocarpus dalbergioides =

Species of legume

Pterocarpus dalbergioides, the Andaman padauk, Andaman redwood or East Indian mahogany, is a species of flowering plant in the family Fabaceae. It is sometimes called "narra", but this is just a generic term used for any of several Pterocarpus species. It is native to the Andaman Islands.

== Description ==
This is a large evergreen tree, with ascending branches spreading towards the tips. Has more numerous leaflets than the similar Pterocarpus indicus. The leaflets are ovate-lanceolate and acuminate, with 5 to 8 pairs of conspicuous secondary nerves. The fruit pod is a winged achene or samara that is nearly hairless and about 5 cm in diameter. The heartwood colour varies from light grey to deep reddish-brown, but this variation is unrelated to any differences in leaves or flowers.

== Distribution ==
The species is native and endemic to the Andaman Islands, India.

== Gallery ==
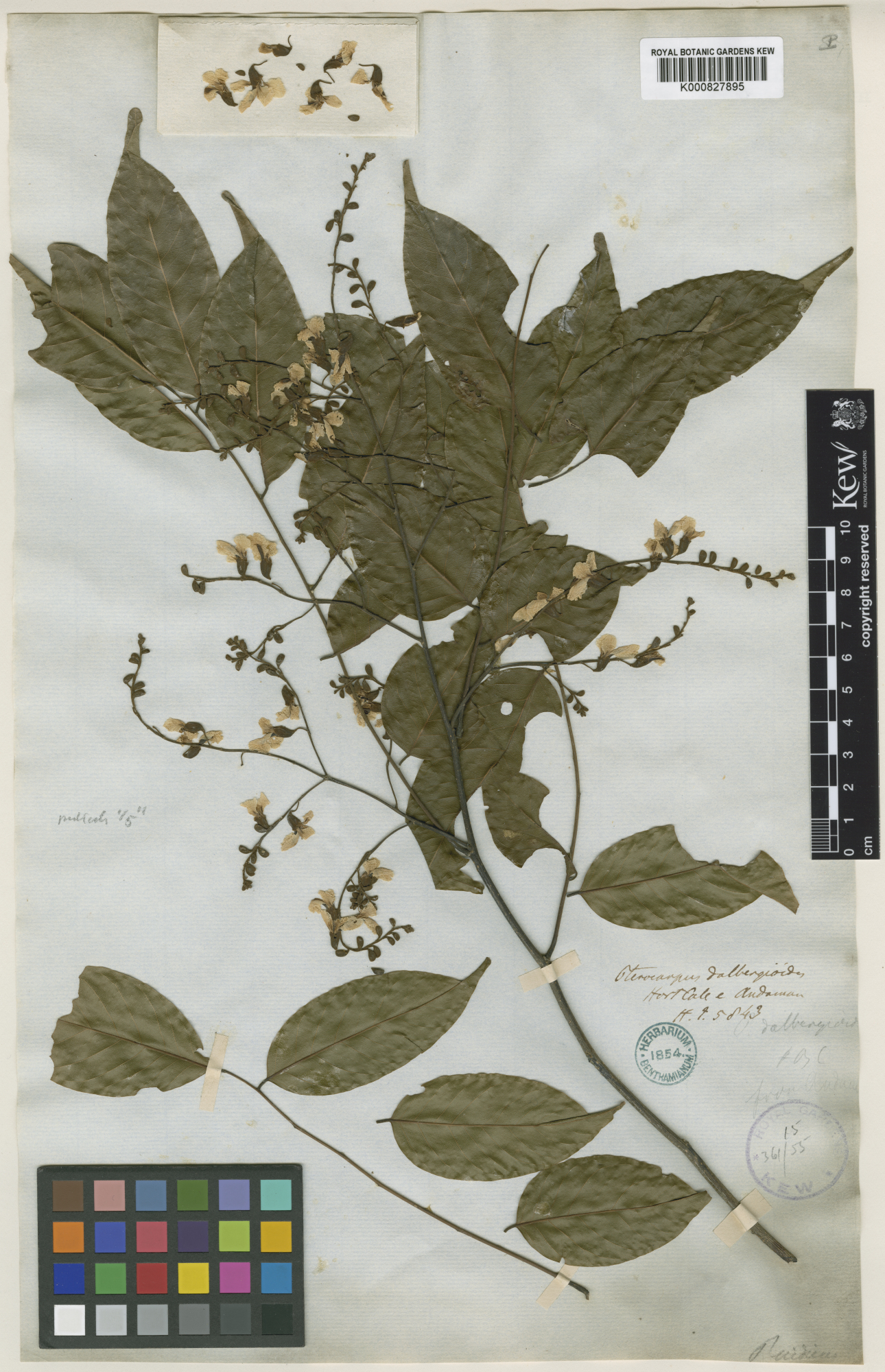
Herbarium specimen of flowering twig

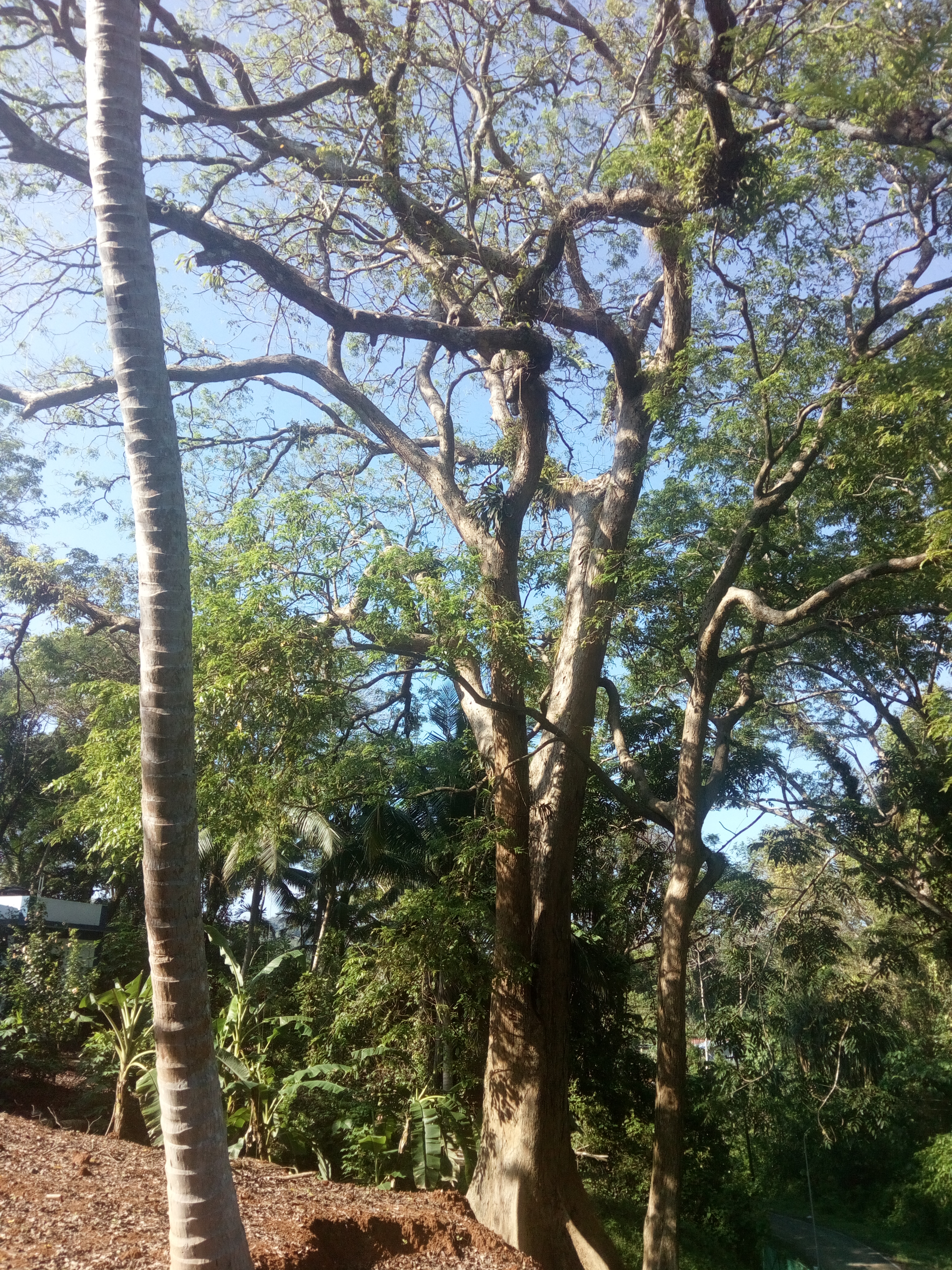
Tree

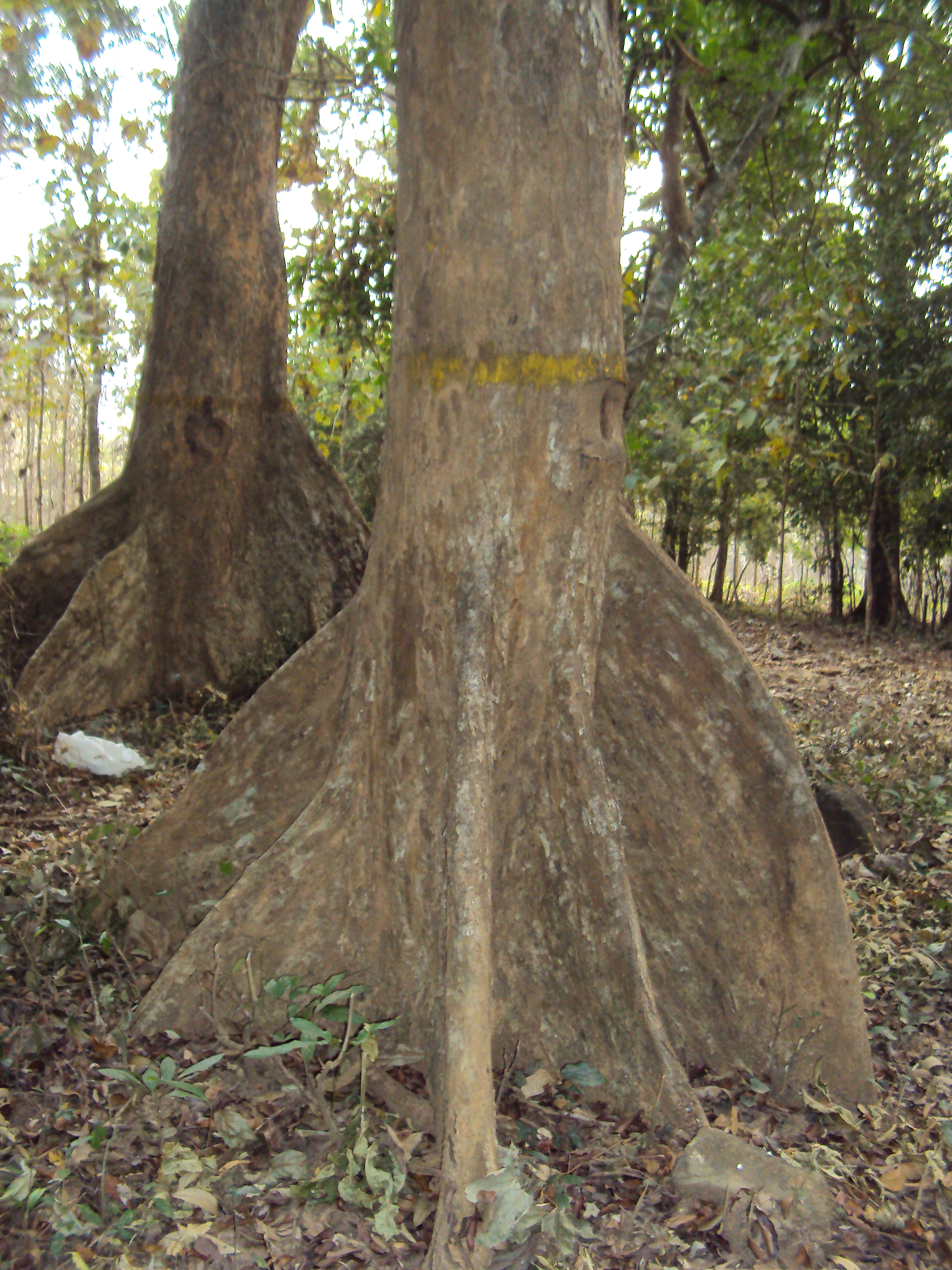
Buttress and trunk

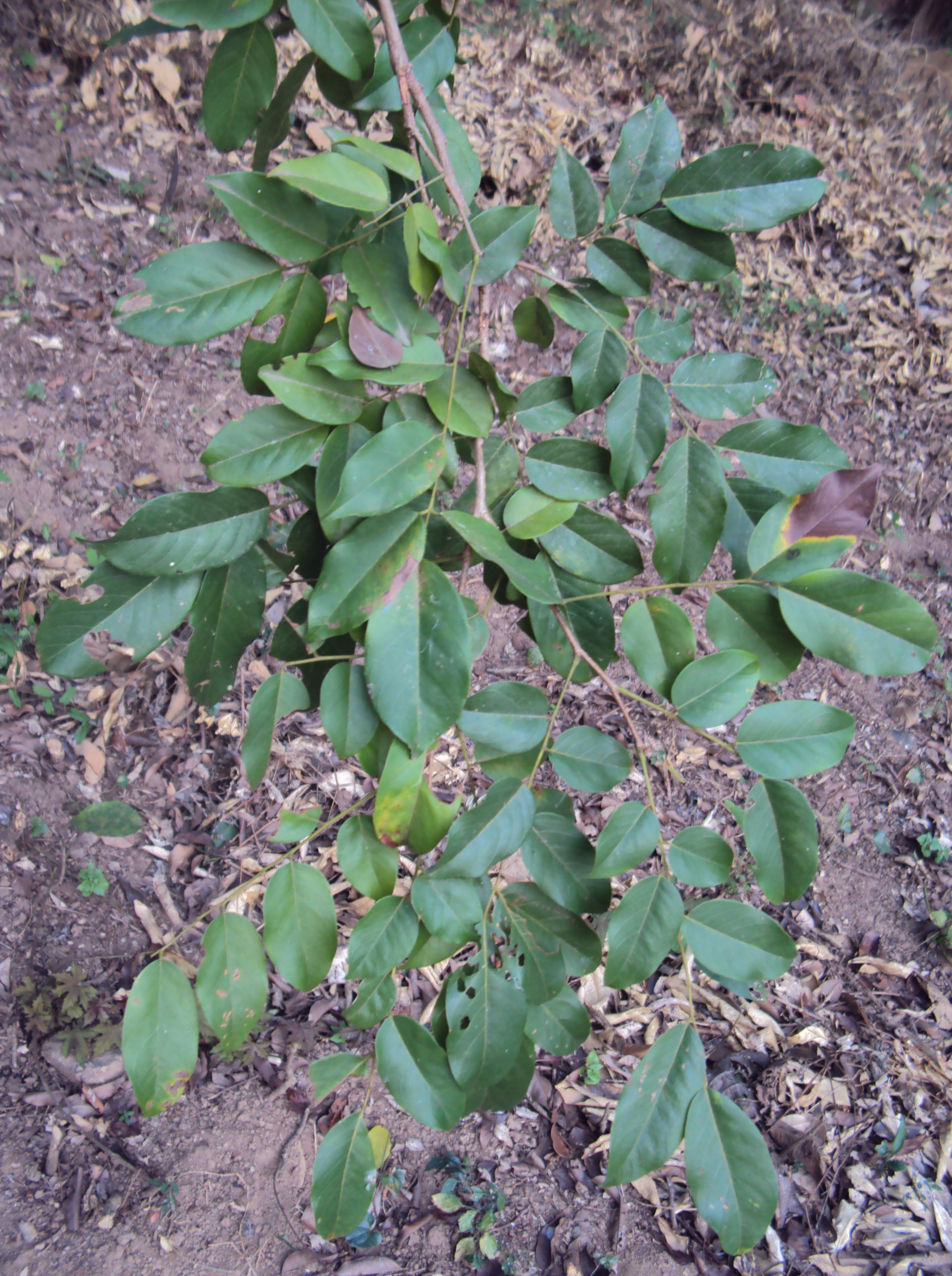
Leaves

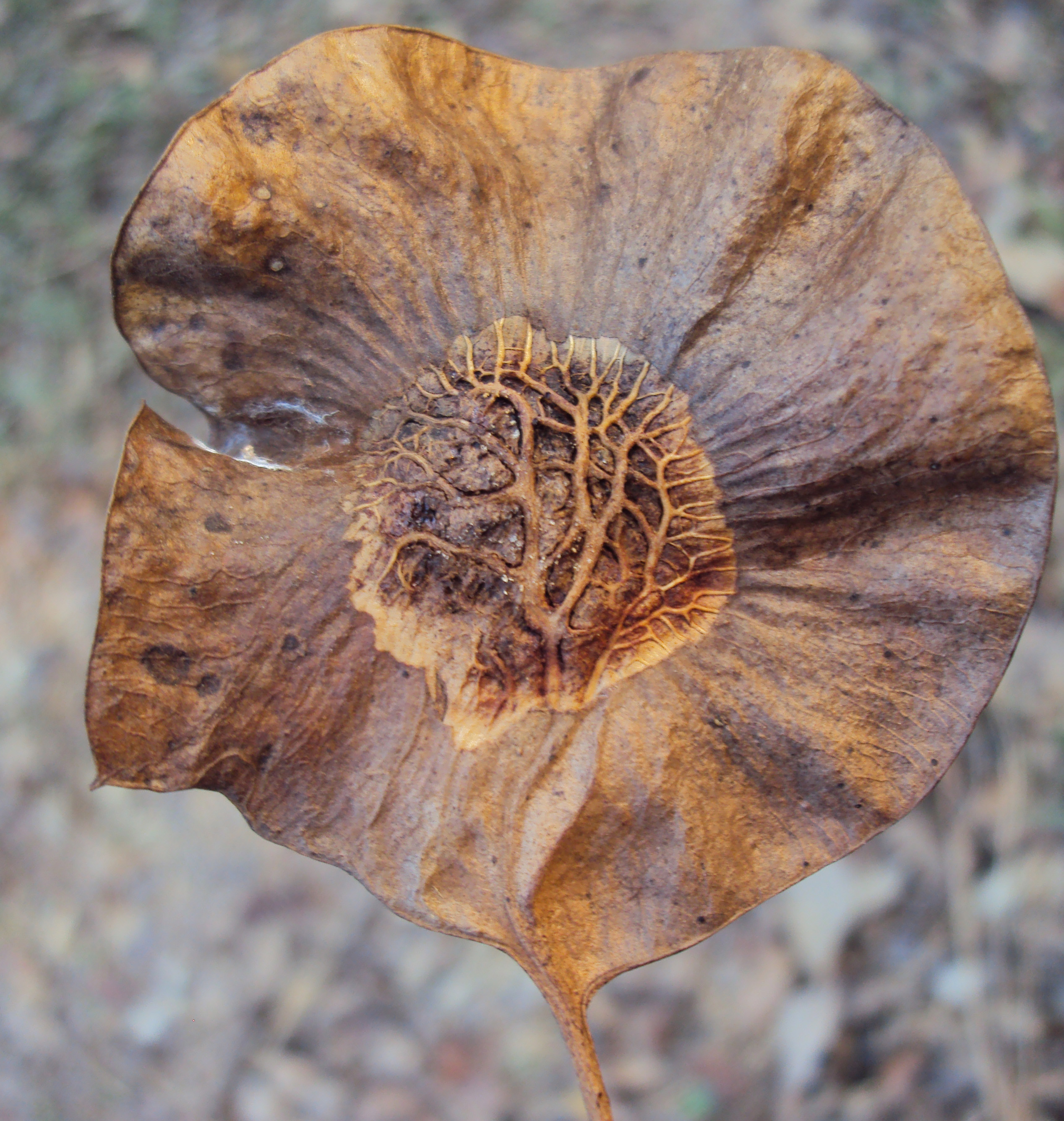
Pod (samara)
