= Pterocarpus brenanii =

Conservation status
- Least Concern (IUCN 3.1)

Scientific classification
- Kingdom: Plantae
- Clade: Tracheophytes
- Clade: Angiosperms
- Clade: Eudicots
- Clade: Rosids
- Order: Fabales
- Family: Fabaceae
- Subfamily: Faboideae
- Genus: Pterocarpus
- Species: P. brenanii

Binomial name
- Pterocarpus brenanii Barbosa & Torre

Species of legume

Pterocarpus brenanii is a species of flowering plant in the family Fabaceae. It is found in Mozambique, Zambia, and Zimbabwe.
