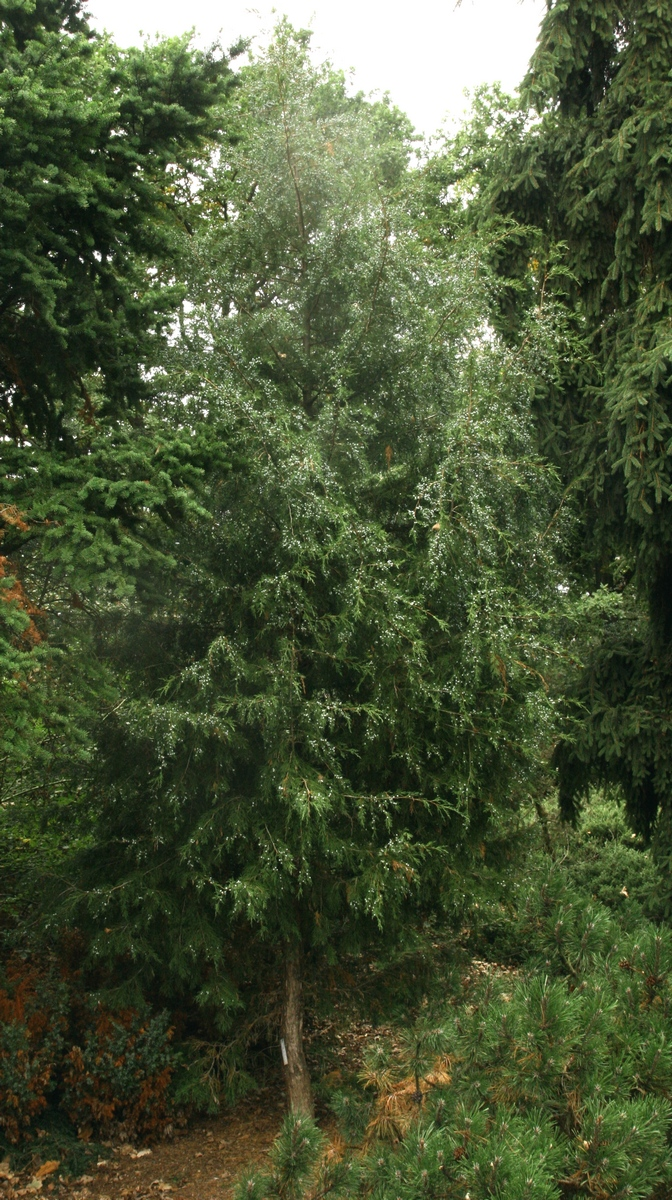

Conservation status
- Least Concern (IUCN 3.1)

Scientific classification
- Kingdom: Plantae
- Clade: Tracheophytes
- Clade: Gymnospermae
- Division: Pinophyta
- Class: Pinopsida
- Order: Cupressales
- Family: Cupressaceae
- Genus: Juniperus
- Section: Juniperus sect. Sabina
- Species: J. semiglobosa

Binomial name
- Juniperus semiglobosa Regel

= Juniperus semiglobosa =

Species of juniper

Juniperus semiglobosa, the Himalayan pencil juniper, is a species of juniper native to the mountains of Central Asia, in northeastern Afghanistan, westernmost China (Xinjiang), northern Pakistan, southeastern Kazakhstan, Kyrgyzstan, western Nepal, northern India, Tajikistan, and Uzbekistan. It grows at altitudes of 1,550–4,420 metres (5,090–14,500 feet).

== Description ==
Juniperus semiglobosa is an evergreen coniferous shrub or small to medium-sized tree growing to heights of 5–15 metres (16–49 feet), rarely 20 m (66 ft), with a trunk diameter of up to 1.2 m (4 ft), rarely to 2–6 m (6 1/2–19 1/2 ft). It has flaky bark. The leaves are of two forms, juvenile needle-like leaves 3–7 millimetres (1/8–1/4 inch) long on seedlings and occasionally (as regrowth after browsing damage) on adult plants, and adult scale-leaves 1–2 mm long on older plants; they are arranged in decussate opposite pairs or whorls of three.

The cones are flattened globose (from which the name semiglobosa) to bi-lobed or triangular, berry-like, 4–6 mm long and 4–8 mm across, blue-black, and contain two or three seeds; they are mature in about 18 months. The pollen cones are 3–5 mm long, and shed their pollen in spring. It is usually dioecious (male and female cones on separate plants), but occasionally monoecious (male and female cones on the same plant).

=== Varieties ===
A variety Juniperus semiglobosa var. talassica has been described from Kyrgyzstan as having sweeter cone pulp, but does not differ from the type in genetics or leaf chemistry, and is not usually regarded as distinct.

== Culture ==
Juniperus semiglobosa, locally "shukpa", is the state tree of Ladakh, where it is found in Leh and Kargil districts. It is locally used in religious ceremonies. However, such uses have led to excessive harvesting of the species.
