= Maharashtracha Favourite Kon? =

Maharashtra Film Award

- Awarded for: Excellence in cinematic achievements in Marathi cinema
- Country: India
- Presented by: Zee Talkies
- First award: 2009

Most recent Maharashtracha Favourite Kon? winners
- Best in films in 2023
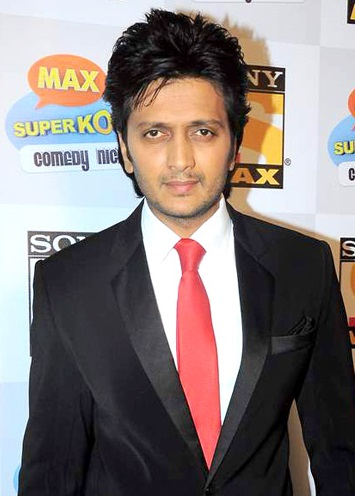

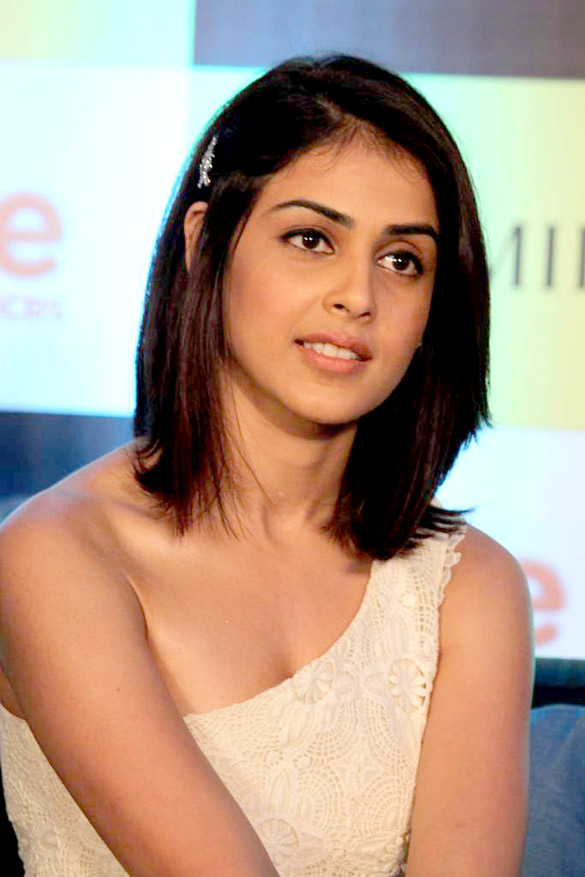

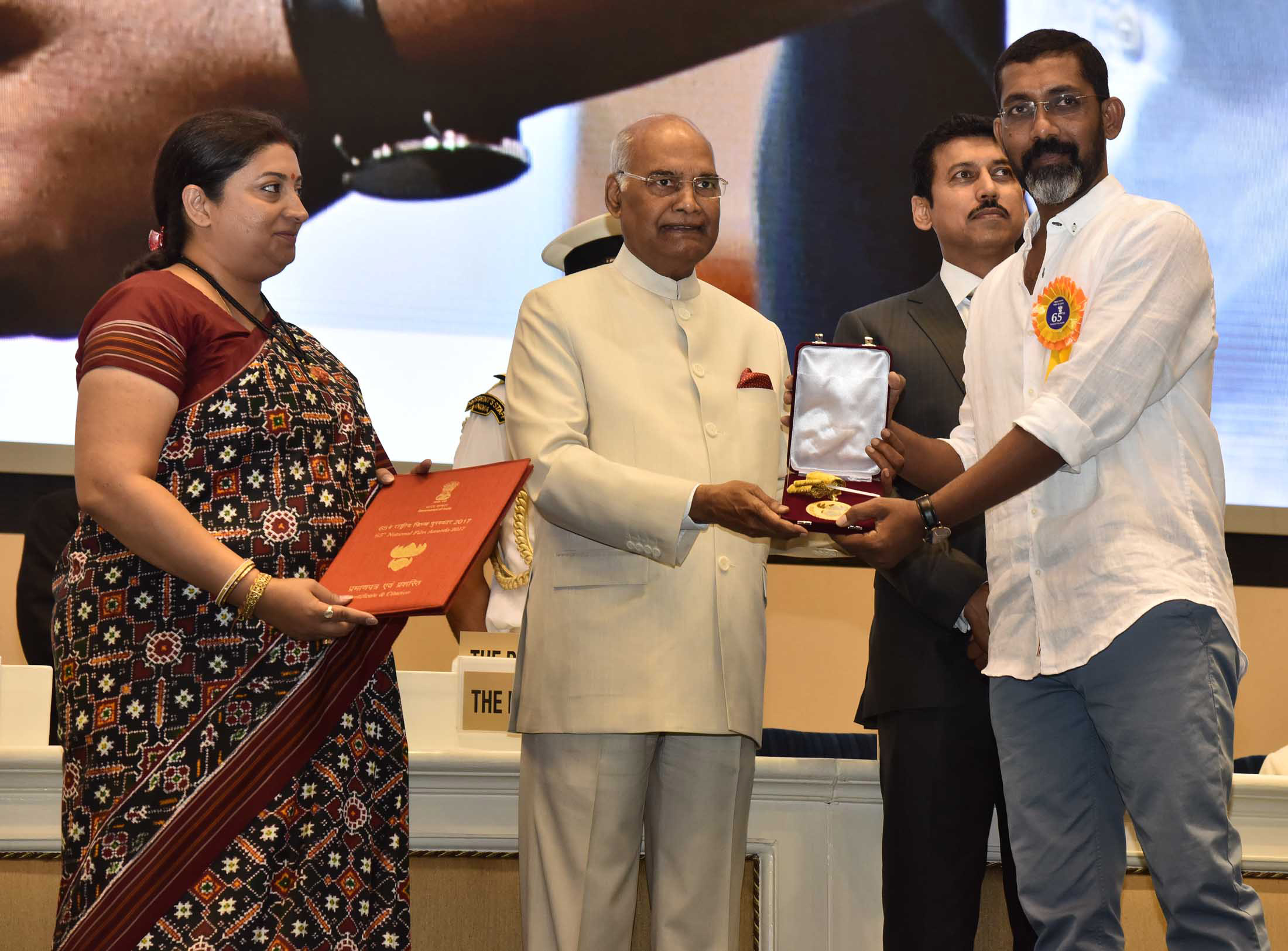

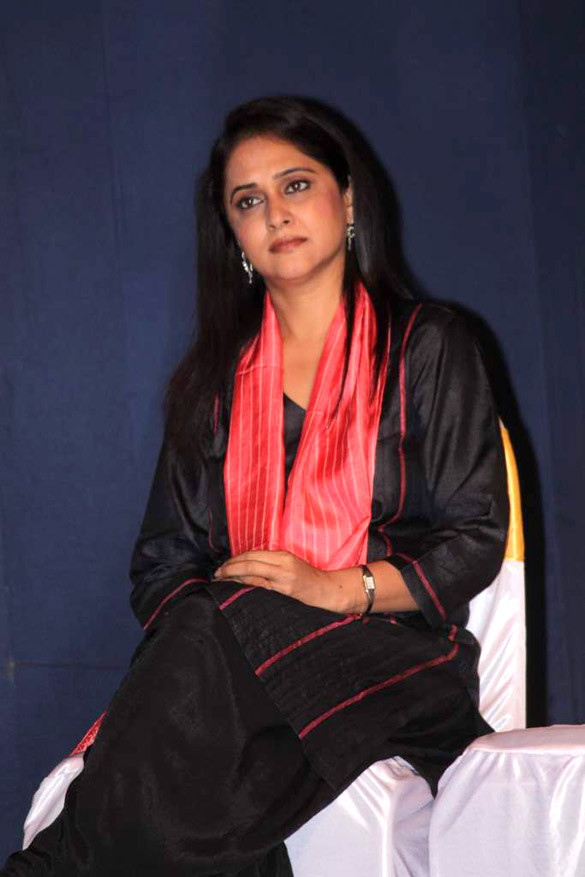
Award	Favourite Actor	Favourite Actress
Winner	Riteish Deshmukh (Ved)	Genelia D'Souza (Ved)
Award	Favourite Supporting Actor	Favourite Supporting Actress
Winner	Nagraj Manjule (Ghar Banduk Biryani)	Mrinal Kulkarni (Subhedar)
Previous Favourite Film
Dharmaveer
Favourite Film
Ved

The Maharashtracha Favourite Kon? Awards are presented by the Marathi television channel Zee Talkies to honour excellence in Marathi cinema. It has been given annually since 2009, with the latest—the 14th edition—of the award-giving ceremony having been held in 2024. The awards are decided by a jury, consisting of noted film-makers, critics and technicians, while winners in a separate category named "Favourite awards" are chosen by public voting.

== History ==
The first edition of the awards was held to select the most popular artists; however, not for any technical work. In the first year of the awards, viewers were asked to choose their all-time favourite film and artists in nine categories - Favourite Hero, Heroine, Film, Director, music director, Playback Singer Male/Female, Villain and Comedian.

== Awards ==
- Favourite Film
- Favourite Director
- Favourite Actor
- Favourite Actress
- Favourite Supporting Actor
- Favourite Supporting Actress
- Favourite Comedian
- Favourite Villain
- Favourite Song
- Favourite Male Debut
- Favourite Female Debut
- Favourite Playback Singer (Male)
- Favourite Playback Singer (Female)
- MFK Award for Style Icon of the Year
- MFK Award for Popular Face of the Year

=== Critics ===
- Favourite Film
- Favourite Director
- Favourite Actor
- Favourite Actress
- Favourite Writer
- Favourite Lyricist

== Ceremony ==
The ceremony is held every year at the Hotel Hyatt Regency in Mumbai and is telecast on Zee Talkies only. However, it is not televised live. Except for the first edition, the ceremonies are held in November or December though always before the announcement of the Filmfare Awards Marathi.

Ceremony	Date	Host(s)	Title sponsor
1st MFK Awards	19 September 2009	Mahesh Manjrekar	Lux
2nd MFK Awards	28 November 2010	Mahesh Manjrekar	Lux
3rd MFK Awards	11 December 2011	Mahesh Manjrekar	Lux
4th MFK Awards	9 December 2012	Mahesh Manjrekar	Lux
5th MFK Awards	2 December 2013	Swapnil Joshi and Pushkar Shrotri	Lux
6th MFK Awards	28 December 2014	Swapnil Joshi and Sai Tamhankar	Lux
7th MFK Awards	20 December 2015	Vaibhav Tatwawadi and Siddharth Chandekar	Lux
8th MFK Awards	17 March 2017	Shreyas Talpade and Amey Wagh	Lux
9th MFK Awards	20 January 2018	Vaibhav Tatwawadi and Amey Wagh	Lux
10th MFK Awards	24 February 2019	Amey Wagh	Lux
11th MFK Awards	12 January 2020	Vaibhav Tatwawadi and Amey Wagh	Lux
12th MFK Awards	23 December 2021	Swapnil Joshi and Amey Wagh	Vaseline
13th MFK Awards	20 January 2023	Amey Wagh and Priyadarshan Jadhav	Jagannath Gangaram Pednekar Jewellers
14th MFK Awards	18 January 2024	Amey Wagh and Mahesh Manjrekar	Jagannath Gangaram Pednekar Jewellers

== 2009 ==
The ceremony was hosted by Mahesh Manjrekar.

De Dhakka led the ceremony with 5 nominations, followed by Aamhi Satpute, Uladhaal, and Galgale Nighale with 4 nominations each.

De Dhakka earned 3 awards, including Favourite Film and Favourite Actor, and Aamhi Satpute earned 2 awards.

Siddhartha Jadhav and Makarand Anaspure received 3 nominations in different categories, where the former earned Favourite Comedian and Favourite Villain, while the latter earned Favourite Actor.

Favourite Film: De Dhakka; Sanai Choughade; Aamhi Satpute	Favourite Jodi: Sachin Pilgaonkar & Supriya Pilgaonkar – Aamhi Satpute; Makarand Anaspure & Siddhartha Jadhav – De Dhakka; Sachin Pilgaonkar & Ashok Saraf – Aamhi Satpute
Favourite Actor: Makarand Anaspure – De Dhakka; Bharat Jadhav – Galgale Nighale; Ankush Chaudhari – Uladhaal	Favourite Actress: Supriya Pilgaonkar – Aamhi Satpute; Madhura Velankar – Uladhaal; Sai Tamhankar – Sanai Choughade
Favourite Comedian: Siddhartha Jadhav – De Dhakka; Nirmiti Sawant – Sasu Numbari Jawai Dus Numbari; Makarand Anaspure – Sasu Numbari Jawai Dus Numbari	Favourite Villain: Siddhartha Jadhav – Galgale Nighale; Ramesh Deo – Galgale Nighale; Lokesh Gupte – Uladhaal
Favourite Song: "Morya Morya" – Uladhaal; "De Dhakka" – De Dhakka; "Gori Gauri" – Galgale Nighale	Favourite Style Icon: Ankush Chaudhari; Sachin Pilgaonkar; Shreyas Talpade
Lux Unforgettable Favourite Face: Sai Tamhankar; Hemangi Kavi; Siyaa Patil

== 2010 ==
The ceremony was hosted by Mahesh Manjrekar.

Natarang led the ceremony with 9 nominations, followed by Me Shivajiraje Bhosale Boltoy with 6 nominations and Gallit Gondhal, Dillit Mujra with 4 nominations respectively.

Me Shivajiraje Bhosale Boltoy and Natarang won 4 awards, thus becoming the most-awarded films at the ceremony.

Favourite Film: Me Shivajiraje Bhosale Boltoy; Natarang; Shikshanachya Aaicha Gho; Gallit Gondhal, Dillit Mujra; Ek Daav Dhobi Pachhad	Favourite Director: Santosh Manjrekar – Me Shivajiraje Bhosale Boltoy; Ravi Jadhav – Natarang; Mahesh Manjrekar – Shikshanachya Aaicha Gho
Favourite Actor: Sachin Khedekar – Me Shivajiraje Bhosale Boltoy; Bharat Jadhav – Shikshanachya Aaicha Gho; Atul Kulkarni – Natarang	Favourite Actress: Sonalee Kulkarni – Natarang; Amruta Khanvilkar – Gaiir; Girija Oak – Huppa Huiyya
Favourite Comedian: Ashok Saraf – Ek Daav Dhobi Pachhad; Makarand Anaspure – Gallit Gondhal, Dillit Mujra; Sidhartha Jadhav – Huppa Huiyya	Favourite Villain: Sayaji Shinde – Gallit Gondhal, Dillit Mujra; Ankush Chaudhari – Gaiir; Ganesh Yadav – Huppa Huiyya
Favourite Singer – Male: Ajay Gogavale – "Khel Mandla" – Natarang; Dnyaneshwar Meshram – "Vitthala Konta Zenda" – Zenda; Sukhwinder Singh – "O Raje" – Me Shivajiraje Bhosale Boltoy	Favourite Singer – Female: Bela Shende – "Wajle Ki Bara" – Natarang; Kalpana – "Galit Gondhal" – Gallit Gondhal, Dillit Mujra; Bela Shende – "Apsara Aali" – Natarang
Favourite Song: "Wajle Ki Bara" – Natarang; "O Raje" – Me Shivajiraje Bhosale Boltoy; "Vitthala Konta Zenda" – Zenda	Favourite Character: Mahesh Manjrekar – Chhatrapati Shivaji Maharaj for Me Shivajiraje Bhosale Boltoy; Kishore Kadam – Pandoba for Natarang; Subodh Bhave – Parkhadkar Master for Ek Daav Dhobi Pachhad
Favourite Style Icon: Ankush Chaudhari; Atul Kulkarni; Mahesh Manjrekar	Lux Glowing Face Of The Year: Sonalee Kulkarni; Amruta Khanvilkar; Priya Bapat

== 2011 ==
The ceremony was hosted by Mahesh Manjrekar.

Mee Sindhutai Sapkal led the ceremony with 7 nominations, followed by Balgandharva with 6 nominations and Lalbaug Parel with 5 nominations respectively.

Mee Sindhutai Sapkal won 4 awards, thus becoming the most-awarded film at the ceremony.

Favourite Film: Mee Sindhutai Sapkal; Lalbaug Parel; Taryanche Bait; Balgandharva; Fakta Ladh Mhana	Favourite Director: Mahesh Manjrekar – Lalbaug Parel; Ananth Mahadevan – Mee Sindhutai Sapkal; Kiran Yadnyopavit – Taryanche Bait; Ravi Jadhav – Balgandharva; Sanjay Jadhav – Fakta Ladh Mhana
Favourite Actor: Sachin Khedekar – Taryanche Bait; Subodh Bhave – Balgandharva; Swapnil Joshi – Mumbai Pune Mumbai; Bharat Jadhav – Shikshanachya Aaicha Gho; Sachit Patil – Arjun	Favourite Actress: Tejaswini Pandit – Mee Sindhutai Sapkal; Mukta Barve – Mumbai Pune Mumbai; Madhura Velankar – Haapus; Amruta Khanvilkar – Arjun; Urmilla Kothare – Mala Aai Vhhaychy!
Favourite Supporting Actor: Siddhartha Jadhav – Lalbaug Parel; Balchandra Kadam – Mast Challay Amcha; Sanjay Narvekar – Fakta Ladh Mhana	Favourite Supporting Actress: Vishakha Subhedar – Mast Challay Amcha; Veena Jamkar – Lalbaug Parel; Jyoti Chandekar – Mee Sindhutai Sapkal
Favourite Villain: Sachin Khedekar – Fakta Ladh Mana; Sameer Dharmadhikari – Lalbaug Parel; Vidyadhar Joshi – Haapus	Favourite Song: "Hey Bhaskara" – Mee Sindhutai Sapkal; "Chinmaya Sakal Hridaya" – Balgandharva; "Kadhi Tu" – Mumbai Pune Mumbai
Favourite Singer – Male: Suresh Wadkar – "Hey Bhaskara" – Mee Sindhutai Sapkal; Hrishikesh Ranade – "Kadhi Tu" – Mumbai Pune Mumbai; Anand Bhate – "Chinmaya Sakal Hridaya" – Balgandharva	Favourite Singer – Female: Bela Shende – "Aaj Mhare Ghar Pavana" – Balgandharva; Devki Pandit – "Itkech Mala Jatana" – Mee Sindhutai Sapkal; Urmila Dhangar – "Amhi Nahi Ja" – Ideachi Kalpana
Favourite Comedy Film: Ideachi Kalpana; Shahanpan Dega Deva; Mast Challay Amcha	Favourite Comedian: Makarand Anaspure – Guldasta; Ashok Saraf – Ideachi Kalpana; Bharat Jadhav – Mast Challay Aamcha
Favourite Style Icon: Aniket Vishwasrao; Jitendra Joshi; Santosh Juvekar	Favourite Face Of The Year: Kranti Redkar; Tejaswini Pandit; Urmila Kanetkar

== 2012 ==
The ceremony was hosted by Mahesh Manjrekar.

Kaksparsh led the ceremony with 8 nominations, followed by Tukaram and Deool with 6 nominations each.

Kaksparsh earned 5 awards and Zhakaas earned 3 awards.

Favourite Film: Kaksparsh; Tukaram; Shala; Morya; Deool	Favourite Director: Mahesh Manjrekar – Kaksparsh; Chandrakanth Kulkarni – Tukaram; Umesh Kulkarni – Deool; Sujay Dahake – Shala; Avadhoot Gupte – Morya
Favourite Actor: Sachin Khedekar – Kaksparsh; Jitendra Joshi – Tukaram; Bharat Jadhav – One Room Kitchen; Girish Kulkarni – Deool; Makarand Anaspure – Dambis	Favourite Actress: Amruta Khanvilkar – Zhakaas; Bhargavi Chirmule – One Room Kitchen; Radhika Apte – Tukaram; Priya Bapat – Kaksparsh; Mukta Barve – Badam Rani Gulam Chor
Favourite Supporting Actor: Jitendra Joshi – Zhakaas; Anand Ingale – Badam Rani Gulam Chor; Hrishikesh Joshi – Masala; Pandarinath Kamble – Yedyanchi Jatra; Ketan Pawar - Shala	Favourite Supporting Actress: Savita Malpekar – Kaksparsh; Atisha Naik – Deool; Vishakha Subhedar – Yedyanchi Jatra; Medha Manjrekar – Kaksparsh; Sai Tamhankar – Zhakaas
Favourite Villain: Vaibhav Mangle – Kaksparsh; Vidyadhar Joshi – Sharyat; Murali Sharma – Ajintha	Favourite Song: "Ganadhisha" – Morya; "Deva Tula Shodhu Kutha" – Deool; "Jaganyacha Paya" – Tukaram
Favourite Singer – Male: Avadhoot Gupte – "Ganadhisha" – Morya; Swapnil Bandodkar – "Swapnatli Pari Tu" – Satrangi Re; Dnyashwar Meshram – "Jaganyacha Paya" – Tukaram	Favourite Singer – Female: Urmila Dhangar – "Welcome Ho Raya Welcome" – Deool; Rajashree Patak – "Kuthe Paath Phiravun" – Kaksparsh; Hamsika Iyer – "Mann Chimb Pavasali" – Ajintha
Favourite Comedy Film: Zhakaas; Yedyanchi Jatra; Teen Bayka Fajiti Aika	Favourite Comedian: Makarand Anaspure – Teen Bayka Fajiti Aika; Ankush Chaudhari – Zhakaas; Bharat Jadhav – Yedyanchi Jatra; Sachin Pilgaonkar – Teecha Baap Tyacha Baap; Vijay Patkar – Lau Ka Laath
Favourite Style Icon: Ankush Chaudhari; Adinath Kothare; Santosh Juvekar	Favourite Face Of The Year: Ketaki Mategaonkar; Sai Tamhankar; Amruta Khanvilkar

== 2013 ==
Favourite Film: Duniyadari; Balak Palak; Time Please; Ekulti Ek; Zapatlela 2	Favourite Director: Sanjay Jadhav – Duniyadari; Ravi Jadhav – Balak Palak; Sachin Pilgaonkar – Ekulti Ek; Mahesh Manjrekar – Konkanastha; Mahesh Kothare – Zapatlela 2
Favourite Actor: Swapnil Joshi – Duniyadari; Vikram Gokhale – Anumati; Sachin Pilgaonkar – Ekulti Ek; Sachin Khedekar – Konkanastha; Atul Kulkarni – Premachi Goshta	Favourite Actress: Sai Tamhankar – Duniyadari; Shriya Pilgaonkar – Ekulti Ek; Kranti Redkar – No Entry Pudhe Dhoka Aahe; Priya Bapat – Time Please; Mrunmayee Deshpande – Mokla Shwaas
Favourite Supporting Actor: Ankush Chaudhari – Duniyadari; Siddhartha Jadhav – Time Please; Subodh Bhave – Anumati; Hrishikesh Joshi – Aajcha Divas Majha; Upendra Limaye – Konkanastha	Favourite Supporting Actress: Urmila Kothare – Duniyadari; Reema Lagoo – Anumati; Sai Tamhankar – Balak Palak; Supriya Pilgaonkar – Ekulti Ek; Pallavi Joshi – Prem Mhanje Prem Mhanje Prem Asta
Favourite Villain: Jitendra Joshi – Duniyadari; Sharad Ponkshe – Mokka Shwaas; Kanistha Kamath – Konkansta; Murli Sharma – Vijay Aso; Ashutosh Rana – Yeda	Favourite Comedian: Siddharth Jadhav – Kho Kho; Bharat Jadhav – No Entry Pudhe Dhoka Aahe; Pushkar Shotri – Sanshay Kallol; Prathamesh Parab – Balak Palak; Makarand Anaspure– Pipani
Favourite Singer – Male: Sonu Nigam – "Tik Tik Vajate Dokyaat" – Duniyadari; Adarsh Shinde – "Deva Tujya" – Duniyadari; Vishal Dadlani – "Karuya Aata" – Balak Palak; Shekhar Ravjiani – "Harvali Pakhre" – Balak Palak; Sachin Pilgaonkar – "Thodi Taiyyari" – Ekulti Ek	Favourite Singer – Female: Sayali Pankaj – "Tik Tik Vajate Dokyaat" – Duniyadari; Yogita Godbole – "Thodi Taiyyari" – Ekulti Ek; Bela Shende – "Olya Sanjveli" – Premachi Goshta; Shalmali Kholgade – "Jag Sare Badale " – Pune 52; Usha Uttup – Life Is Kho – Kho Kho
Favourite Song: "Tik Tik Vajate Dokyaat" – Duniyadari; "Karuya Aata" – Balak Palak; "Harvali Pakhre" – Balak Palak; "Deva Tujya" – Duniyadari; "Zindagi" – Duniyadari	Favourite Style Icon: Swapnil Joshi; Ankush Chaudhari; Adinath Kothare; Umesh Kamath; Sushant Shelar; Aniket Vishwashrao
Popular Face of the Year: Sai Tamhankar

== 2014 ==
Favourite Film: Lai Bhaari; Timepass; Poster Boys; Rege; Fandry	Favourite Director: Nishikant Kamat – Lai Bhaari
Favourite Actor: Ritesh Deshmukh – Lai Bhaari; Sachin Khedekar – Pitruroon; Swapnil Joshi – Mangalashtak Once More; Dilip Prabavalkar – Narbhachi Vadi; Mahesh Manjrekar – Rege; Prathamesh Parab – Timepass	Favourite Actress: Ketaki Mategaonkar – Timepass; Radhika Apte – Lai Bhaari; Tanuja – Pitruroon; Sai Tamhankar – Sau Shashi Deodhar; Urmila Matondkar – Ajoba; Mukta Barve – Mangalashtak Once More
Favourite Supporting Actor: Pushkar Shrotri – Rege	Favourite Supporting Actress: Tanvi Azmi – Lai Bhaari
Favourite Villain: Sharad Kelkar – Lai Bhaari	Favourite Comedian: Aroh Welankar – Rege
Favourite Child Actor: Somnath Awghade – Fandry	Favourite Song: "Mauli Mauli" – Lai Bhaari
Favourite Singer – Male: Ajay Gogavale – "Mauli Mauli" – Lai Bhaari	Favourite Singer – Female: Ketaki Mategaonkar – "Mala Ved Laagale" – Timepass
Favourite Style Icon: Ritesh Deshmukh	Favourite Face Of The Year: Amruta Khanvilkar

== 2015 ==
Timepass 2 and Double Seat led the ceremony with 11 nominations, followed by Classmates with 9 nominations and Elizabeth Ekadashi with 7 nominations, respectively. Ankush Chaudhari and Priya Bapat had two nominations for Favourite Actor and Favourite Actress respectively, former won it for Classmates.

Double Seat won 4 awards, thus becoming the most-awarded film at the ceremony.

Favourite Film: Dr. Prakash Baba Amte - The Real Hero; Timepass 2; Double Seat; Elizabeth Ekadashi; Classmates; Killa	Favourite Director: Paresh Mokashi – Elizabeth Ekadashi; Ravi Jadhav – Timepass 2; Sameer Vidwans – Double Seat; Aditya Sarpotdar – Classmates; Sanjay Jadhav – Pyaar Vali Love Story; Avinash Arun – Killa
Favourite Actor: Ankush Chaudhari – Classmates; Ankush Chaudhari – Double Seat; Nana Patekar – Dr. Prakash Baba Amte - The Real Hero; Atul Kulkarni – Happy Journey; Swapnil Joshi – Pyaar Vali Love Story; Priyadarshan Jadhav – Timepass 2	Favourite Actress: Mukta Barve – Double Seat; Priya Bapat – Timepass 2; Priya Bapat – Happy Journey; Sonali Kulkarni – Dr. Prakash Baba Amte - The Real Hero; Sai Tamhankar – Pyaar Vali Love Story; Amruta Subhash – Killa
Favourite Supporting Actor: Vaibhav Mangle – Timepass 2; Siddharth Chandekar – Classmates; Vidyadhar Joshi – Double Seat; Pushkar Shrotri – Paying Guest; Sandeep Pathak – Timepass 2	Favourite Supporting Actress: Sai Tamhankar – Classmates; Nandita Dhuri – Elizabeth Ekadashi; Vandana Gupte – Double Seat; Urmila Kanitkar – Pyaar Vali Love Story; Sharvani Pillai – Paying Guest
Favourite Debut Actor: Gashmeer Mahajani – Deool Band; Dharam Gohil – Aga Bai Arechyaa 2; Shivraj Vaichal – Aga Bai Arrechaa 2; Manasi Moghe – Bugadi Maazi Sandli Ga; Pallavi Patil – Classmates; Neha Mahajan – Nilkanth Master	Favourite Child Actor: Sayali Bhandharkavthekar – Elizabeth Ekadashi; Shrirang Mahajan – Elizabeth Ekadashi; Archit Deodhar – Killa; Parth Bhalerao – Killa; Mihiresh Joshi – Avatarchi Ghost; Pushkar Lonarkar – Elizabeth Ekadashi
Favourite Singer – Male: Jasraj Joshi – "Kiti Sangaychay Mala" – Double Seat; Ajay Gogavale – "Man Suddha Tuze" – Aga Bai Arechyaa 2; Shankar Mahadevan – "Jagnyache Bhan He" – Aga Bai Arrechya 2; Vishal Dadlani – "Waou Waou" – Timepass 2; Swapnil Bandodkar – "Savar Re" – Mitwaa; Harshavardhan Wavare & Amitraj – "Teri Meri Yaariyan" – Classmates	Favourite Singer – Female: Anandi Joshi – "Kiti Sangaychay Mala" – Double Seat; Apeksha Dandekar – "Madan Pichkari" – Timepass 2; Shalmali Kholgade – "Fresh" – Happy Journey; Janhavi Prabhu Arora – "Savar Re" – Mitwaa; Shreya Ghoshal – "Mohini" – Double Seat; Ketaki Mategaonkar – "Sunya Sunya" – Timepass 2
Favourite Song: "Kiti Sangaychay Mala" – Double Seat; "Waou Waou" – Timepass 2; "Dagad Dagad" – Elizabeth Ekadashi; "Sunya Sunya" – Timepass 2; "Man Suddha Tuze" – Double Seat; "Teri Meri Yariyan" – Classmates	Favourite Style Icon: Ankush Chaudhari; Ritesh Deshmukh; Swapnil Joshi; Shreyas Talpade; Vaibhav Tatwawadi; Gashmeer Mahajani
Favourite Face Of The Year: Priya Bapat; Amruta Khanvilkar; Spruha Joshi; Sai Tamhankar; Sonalee Kulkarni; Pooja Sawant

== 2016 ==
Sairat led the ceremony with 19 nominations, followed by Katyar Kaljat Ghusali with 11 nominations.

Sairat won 11 awards, thus becoming the most-awarded film at the ceremony.

Favourite Film: Sairat; Katyar Kaljat Ghusali; Natsamrat; Mumbai Pune Mumbai 2; Dagdi Chawl; Poshter Girl	Favourite Director: Nagraj Manjule – Sairat; Subodh Bhave – Katyar Kaljat Ghusali; Mahesh Manjrekar – Natsamrat; Satish Rajwade – Mumbai Pune Mumbai 2; Chandrakant Kanse – Dagdi Chawl; Sameer Patil – Poshter Girl
Favourite Actor: Akash Thosar – Sairat; Subodh Bhave – Katyar Kaljat Ghusali; Nana Patekar – Natsamrat; Swapnil Joshi – Mumbai Pune Mumbai 2; Ankush Chaudhari – Dagdi Chawl	Favourite Actress: Rinku Rajguru – Sairat; Amruta Khanvilkar – Katyar Kaljat Ghusali; Mrunmayee Deshpande – Katyar Kaljat Ghusali; Mukta Barve – Mumbai Pune Mumbai 2; Medha Manjrekar – Natsamrat; Sonalee Kulkarni – Poshter Girl
Favourite Supporting Actor: Tanaji Galgunde – Sairat; Vikram Gokhale – Natsamrat; Prashant Damle – Mumbai Pune Mumbai 2; Jitendra Joshi – Poshter Girl; Makarand Deshpande – Dagdi Chawl	Favourite Supporting Actress: Chhaya Kadam – Sairat; Sakshi Tanvar – Katyar Kaljat Ghusali; Neha Pendse – Natsamrat; Mrunmayee Deshpande – Natsamrat; Asawari Joshi – Mumbai Pune Mumbai 2
Favourite Debut Actor: Aakash Thosar – Sairat; Amitriyan Patil – Rajwade & Sons; Akshay Tanksale – YZ	Favourite Debut Actress: Rinku Rajguru – Sairat; Mitali Mayekar – Urfi; Kritika Dev– Rajwade & Sons
Favourite Villain: Sachin Pilgaonkar – Katyar Kaljat Ghusali; Suraj Pawar – Sairat; Suresh Vishwakarma – Sairat; Sanjay Khapre – Dagdi Chawl	Favourite Song: "Zingaat" – Sairat; "Yad Lagla" – Sairat; "Sairat Jhala Ji" – Sairat; "Aata Ga Baya Ka Bavarla" – Sairat; "Sur Niragas Ho" – Katyar Kaljat Ghusali; "Awaaz Vadhav Dj" – Poshter Girl
Favourite Singer – Male: Ajay-Atul – "Yad Lagla" – Sairat; Ajay Gogavale – "Yad Lagla" – Sairat; Ajay Gogavale – "Sairat Jhala Ji" – Sairat; Shankar Mahadevan – "Sur Niragas Ho" – Katyar Kaljat Ghusali; Anand Shinde, Adarsh Shinde – "Awaaz Vadhav Dj" – Poshter Girl; Mahesh Kale – "Aruni Kirani" – Katyar Kaljat Ghusali	Favourite Singer – Female: Shreya Ghoshal – "Aata Ga Baya Ka Bavarla" – Sairat; Chinmayi Sripada – "Sairat Jhala Ji" – Sairat; Anandi Joshi – "Sur Niragas Ho" – Katyar Kaljat Ghusali; Bela Shende – "Sath De Tu Mala" – Mumbai Pune Mumbai 2; Anandi Joshi, Bela Shende – "Band Baja Baraat" – Mumbai Pune Mumbai 2; Anandi Joshi – "Dhagadhaga" – Dagdi Chawl
Favourite Style Icon: Aakash Thosar; Swapnil Joshi; Ankush Chaudhari; Vaibhav Tatwawadi; Gashmeer Mahajani; Siddharth Chandekar	Favourite Face Of The Year: Rinku Rajguru; Amruta Khanvilkar; Sonalee Kulkarni; Pooja Sawant; Sai Tamhankar; Spruha Joshi

== 2017 ==
Ventilator led the ceremony with 12 nominations, followed by Ti Saddhya Kay Karte with 9 nominations.

Faster Fene and Ti Saddhya Kay Karte won 4 awards each, thus becoming the most-awarded films at the ceremony.

Favourite Film: Faster Fene; Ventilator; Ti Saddhya Kay Karte; Boyz; Chi Va Chi Sau Ka; Muramba	Favourite Director: Aditya Sarpotdar – Faster Fene; Rajesh Mapuskar – Ventilator; Satish Rajwade – Ti Saddhya Kay Karte; Vishal Devrukhkar – Boyz; Paresh Mokashi – Chi Va Chi Sau Ka; Varun Narvekar – Muramba
Favourite Actor: Amey Wagh – Faster Fene; Amey Wagh – Muramba; Jitendra Joshi – Ventilator; Ankush Chaudhari – Ti Saddhya Kay Karte; Lalit Prabhakar – Chi Va Chi Sau Ka; Parth Bhalerao – Boyz	Favourite Actress: Sai Tamhankar – Jaundya Na Balasaheb; Mithila Palkar – Muramba; Mrunmayee Godbole – Chi Va Chi Sau Ka; Sonali Kulkarni – Kachcha Limboo; Parna Pethe – Faster Fene; Mukta Barve – Hrudayantar
Favourite Supporting Actor: Sachin Khedekar – Muramba; Ashutosh Gowarikar – Ventilator; Dilip Prabhavalkar – Faster Fene; Siddhartha Jadhav – Faster Fene; Bhalchandra Kadam – Jaundya Na Balasaheb; Pushkaraj Chirputkar – Baapjanma	Favourite Supporting Actress: Shilpa Tulaskar – Boyz; Namrata Awate – Ventilator; Sukanya Kulkarni – Ventilator; Sai Tamhankar – Family Katta; Reema Lagoo – Jaundya Na Balasaheb; Chinmayi Sumeet – Muramba
Favourite Debut Actor: Abhinay Berde – Ti Saddhya Kay Karte; Lalit Prabhakar – Chi Va Chi Sauka; Sumedh Mudgalkar – Ventilator & Manjha; Ravi Jadhav – Kachcha Limboo	Favourite Debut Actress: Aarya Ambekar – Ti Saddhya Kay Karte; Mithila Palkar – Muramba; Rucha Inamdar – Bhikari
Favourite Villain: Girish Kulkarni – Faster Fene; Zhakir Hussain – Boyz; Hemant Dhome – Baghtos Kay Mujra Kar; Kiran Karmarkar – Kanha	Favourite Song: "Hrudayat Vaje Something" – Ti Saddhya Kay Karte; "Baba" – Ventilator; "Ya Re Ya" – Ventilator; "Bring It On" – Jaundya Na Balasaheb; "Dolbywalya" – Jaundya Na Balasaheb; "Lagnalu" – Boyz
Favourite Singer – Male: Kaustubh Gaikwad, Janardan Khandalkar – "Lagnalu" – Boyz; Ajay Gogavale – "Bring It On" – Jaundya Na Balasaheb; Nagesh Morwekar, Earl D'Souza – "Dolbywalya" – Jaundya Na Balasaheb; Rohan Pradhan – "Ya Re Ya" – Ventilator; Rohan Pradhan – "Baba" – Ventilator; Vidit Patankar – "Hrudayat Vaje Something" – Ti Saddhya Kay Karte; Riteish Deshmukh – "Fefe Song" – Faster Fene	Favourite Singer – Female: Aarya Ambekar – "Hrudayat Vaje Something" – Ti Saddhya Kay Karte; Aarya Ambekar – "Jara Jara" – Ti Saddhya Kay Karte; Priyanka Chopra – "Baba" – Ventilator; Sunidhi Chauhan – "Kutha Kutha Jayacha Honeymoonla" – Boyz; Anandi Joshi – "Aga Aik Na" – Muramba; Vaishali Samant, Sonu Kakkar – "Krishna Janmala" – Kanha
Favourite Style Icon: Amey Wagh; Abhinay Berde; Swapnil Joshi; Aakash Thosar; Ankush Chaudhari; Vaibhav Tatwawadi; Gashmeer Mahajani	Favourite Face Of The Year: Sai Tamhankar

== 2018 ==
Favourite Film: Mulshi Pattern; Ye Re Ye Re Paisa; Boyz 2; Farzand; Naal; Baban	Favourite Director: Pravin Tarde – Mulshi Pattern; Sanjay Jadhav – Ye Re Ye Re Paisa; Digpal Lanjekar – Farzand; Vishal Devrukhkar – Boyz 2; Sudhakar Reddy Yakkanti – Naal; Bhaurao Karhade – Baban
Favourite Actor: Subodh Bhave – Pushpak Vimaan; Parth Bhalerao – Boyz 2; Shrinivas Pokale – Naal; Om Bhutkar – Mulshi Pattern; Bhausaheb Shinde – Baban	Favourite Actress: Madhuri Dixit – Bucket List; Tejaswini Pandit – Ye Re Ye Re Paisa; Sonali Kulkarni – Gulabjaam; Kalyani Mulye – Nude; Devika Daftardar – Naal; Mrunmayee Deshpande – Farzand
Favourite Supporting Actor: Nagraj Manjule – Naal; Dilip Prabhavalkar – Dashakriya; Siddhartha Jadhav – Ye Re Ye Re Paisa; Sanjay Narvekar – Ye Re Ye Re Paisa; Upendra Limaye – Mulshi Pattern; Mohan Joshi – Pushpak Viman	Favourite Supporting Actress: Mrinal Kulkarni – Ye Re Ye Re Paisa; Vishakha Subhedar – Ye Re Ye Re Paisa; Chhaya Kadam – Nude; Gauri Kiran – Pushpak Vimaan; Spruha Joshi – Home Sweet Home; Mukta Barve – Aamhi Doghi
Favourite Debut Actor: Shrinivas Pokale – Naal	Favourite Debut Actress: Kalyanee Mulay – Nude
Favourite Villain: Pravin Tarde – Mulshi Pattern; Devendra Gaikwad – Baban; Manoj Joshi – Dashakriya; Onkar Bhojane – Boyz 2	Favourite Song: "Jau De Nav" – Naal; "Devak Kalji Re" – Redu; "Ararara" – Mulshi Pattern; "Khandala Ghat" – Ye Re Ye Re Paisa; "Ye Re Ye Re Paisa" – Ye Re Ye Re Paisa; "Ghoti Soda" – Boyz 2
Favourite Singer – Male: Ajay Gogavale – "Devak Kalji Re" – Redu; Pravin Kuvar – "Ye Re Ye Re Paisa" – Ye Re Ye Re Paisa; Jayesh Kumar – "Jau De Nav" – Naal; Adarsh Shinde – "Ararara" – Mulshi Pattern; Adarsh Shinde, Rohit Raut – "Ghoti Soda" – Boyz 2; Avadhoot Gupte – "Un Un" – Mulshi Pattern	Favourite Singer – Female: Vaishali Samant – "Khandala Ghat" – Ye Re Ye Re Paisa; Janhvi Prabhu Arora – "Ye Re Ye Re Paisa" – Ye Re Ye Re Paisa; Shreya Ghoshal, Sadhana Sargam – "Jau De Nav" – Naal; Vaishali Mhade – "Un Un" – Mulshi Pattern; Vaishali Mhade – "Veglya Vata " – Aamhi Doghi; Ankita Joshi, Anandi Joshi – "Hey Darvayta" – Naal
Favourite Style Icon: Swapnil Joshi; Lalit Prabhakar; Ankush Chaudhari; Amey Wagh; Siddharth Chandekar; Umesh Kamat	Favourite Face Of The Year: Vaidehi Parashurami; Sai Tamhankar; Mithila Palkar; Mrunal Thakur; Sonalee Kulkarni; Mrunmayee Deshpande
Lux Diva Award: Pooja Sawant

== 2019 ==
The ceremony was hosted by Vaibhav Tatwawadi and Amey Wagh.

Fatteshikast led the ceremony with 12 nominations, followed by Khari Biscuit with 8 and Anandi Gopal with 6 nominations.

Khari Biscuit earned 4 awards, making it the most-awarded film of the ceremony, whereas Hirkani earned 3 awards including Favourite Film, Favourite Actress and Best Supporting Actor.

Favourite Film: Hirkani; Anandi Gopal; Khari Biscuit; Takatak; Ye Re Ye Re Paisa 2; Fatteshikast	Favourite Director: Sanjay Jadhav – Khari Biscuit; Sameer Vidwans – Anandi Gopal; Prasad Oak – Hirkani; Milind Kavde – Takatak; Hemant Dhome – Ye Re Ye Re Paisa 2; Digpal Lanjekar – Fatteshikast
Favourite Actor: Lalit Prabhakar – Anandi Gopal; Prathamesh Parab – Takatak; Ankush Chaudhari – Triple Seat; Sanjay Narvekar – Ye Re Ye Re Paisa 2; Swapnil Joshi – Mogra Phulaalaa; Chinmay Mandlekar – Fatteshikast	Favourite Actress: Sonalee Kulkarni – Hirkani; Bhagyashree Milind – Anandi Gopal; Ritika Shrotri – Takatak; Shivani Surve – Triple Seat; Mukta Barve – Bandishala; Mrunmayee Deshpande – Fatteshikast
Favourite Supporting Actor: Prasad Oak – Hirkani; Kushal Badrike – Rampaat; Ankit Mohan – Fatteshikast; Anand Ingale – Ye Re Ye Re Paisa 2; Ajay Purkar – Fatteshikast	Favourite Supporting Actress: Mrinal Kulkarni – Fatteshikast; Neena Kulkarni – Mogra Phulaalaa; Nandita Patkar – Khari Biscuit; Priya Berde – Rampaat; Pallavi Patil – Triple Seat; Neha Joshi – Nashibvaan
Favourite Singer – Male: Adarsh Shinde – "Tula Japnar Aahe" – Khari Biscuit; Adarsh Shinde – "Tu Jowgwa Vaad Mai" – Fatteshikast; Adarsh Shinde – "Aali Thumkat Naar" – Mumbai Pune Mumbai 3; Alap Desai – "Tuzi Athavan" – Miss U Mister; Kunal Ganjawala – "Khari" – Khari Biscuit; Ajay Purkar, Ashutosh Mungle – "Rani Phadakti Lakho Zende" – Fatteshikast	Favourite Singer – Female: Ronkini Gupta – "Tula Japnar Aahe" – Khari Biscuit; Priyanka Barve – "Waata Waata Waata Ga" – Anandi Gopal; Anandi Joshi – "Tuzi Athavan" – Miss U Mister; Bela Shende – "Aaichaan Ra" – Rampaat; Bela Shende – "Akhiyan Yeh Dekho Kanha" – Fatteshikast
Favourite Song: "Tula Japnar Aahe" – Khari Biscuit; "Shivrajyabhishek Geet" – Hirkani; "Khari" – Khari Biscuit; "Rang Mayiyela" – Anandi Gopal; "Reni Fadkti Lakho Zende" – Fatteshikast; "Tu Jowgwa Vaad Mai" – Fatteshikast	Favourite Style Icon: Ankush Chaudhari; Adinath Kothare; Swapnil Joshi; Amey Wagh; Siddhartha Jadhav; Akash Thosar
Favourite Face Of The Year: Shivani Surve; Sai Tamhankar; Amruta Khanvilkar; Rinku Rajguru; Sonalee Kulkarni; Vaidehi Parashurami

== 2021 ==
The awards were organized to honored the best Marathi films of the decade. It took place in December 2021 and was hosted by Swapnil Joshi and Amey Wagh, along with Mahesh Manjrekar.

The nominations were the winners from 2010 to 2019.

Sairat won 5 awards, thus becoming the most-awarded film at the ceremony.

Favourite Film: Sairat; Me Shivajiraje Bhosle Boltoy; Mee Sindhutai Sapkal; Kakparsh; Duniyadari; Lai Bhaari; Dr. Prakash Baba Amte - The Real Hero; Faster Fene; Mulshi Pattern; Hirkani	Favourite Director: Nagraj Manjule – Sairat; Santosh Manjrekar – Me Shivajiraje Bhosle Boltoy; Mahesh Manjrekar – Lalbaug Parel; Mahesh Manjrekar – Kaksparsh; Sanjay Jadhav – Duniyadari; Nishikant Kamat – Lai Bhaari; Paresh Mokashi – Elizabeth Ekadashi; Aditya Sarpotdar – Faster Fene; Pravin Tarde – Mulshi Pattern; Sanjay Jadhav – Khari Biscuit
Favourite Actor: Riteish Deshmukh – Lai Bhaari; Sachin Khedekar – Me Shivajiraje Bhosle Boltoy; Sachin Khedekar – Taryanche Bait; Sachin Khedekar – Kaksparsh; Swapnil Joshi – Duniyadari; Ankush Chaudharyi – Classmates; Akash Thosar – Sairat; Amey Wagh – Faster Fene; Subodh Bhave – Pushpak Viman; Lalit Prabhakar – Anandi Gopal	Favourite Actress: Rinku Rajguru – Sairat; Sonalee Kulkarni – Natarang; Tejaswini Pandit – Mee Sindhutai Sapkal; Amruta Khanvilkar – Zhakaas; Sai Tamhankar – Duniyadari; Ketaki Mategaonkar – Timepass; Mukta Barve – Double Seat; Sai Tamhankar – Jaundya Na Balasaheb; Madhuri Dixit – Bucket List; Sonali Kulkarni – Hirkani
Favourite Supporting Actor: Ankush Chaudhari – Duniyadari; Siddharth Jadhav – Lalbaug Parel; Jitendra Joshi – Zhakaas; Pushkar Shrotri – Regge; Vaibhav Mangle – Timepass 2; Tanaji Galgunde – Sairat; Sachin Khedekar – Muramba; Nagraj Manjule – Naal; Prasad Oak – Hirkani	Favourite Supporting Actress: Sai Tamhankar – Classmates; Vishakha Subhedar – Mast Challay Aamcha; Savita Malpekar – Kaksparsh; Urmila Kanitkar – Duniyadari; Tanvi Azmi – Lai Bhaari; Chhaya Kadam – Sairat; Shilpa Tulaskar – Boys; Mrinal Kulkarni – Ye Re Ye Re Paisa; Mrinal Kulkarni – Fatteshikast
Favourite Villain: Pravin Tarde – Mulshi Pattern; Sayaji Shinde – Gallit Gondhal, Dillit Mujra; Sachin Khedekar – Fakta Ladh Mhana; Vaibhav Mangle – Kaksparsh; Jitendra Joshi – Duniyadari; Sharad Kelkar – Lai Bhaari; Sachin Pilgaonkar – Katyar Kaljat Ghusali; Girish Kulkarni – Faster Fene	Favourite Song: "Zingaat" – Sairat; "Wajle Ki Bara" – Natarang; "Hey Bhaskara" – Mee Sindhutai Sapkal; "Ganadhisha" – Morya; "Tik Tik Vajate Dokyaat" – Duniyadari; "Mauli Mauli" – Lai Bhaari; "Kiti Sangaichay Mala" – Double Seat; "Hrudayat Vaje Something" – Ti Saddhya Kay Karte; "Devak Kayji Re" – Redu; "Tula Japnar Aahe" – Khari Biscuit
Favourite Singer – Male: Ajay- Atul – "Zingaat" – Sairat; Ajay Gogavale – "Khel Mandla" – Natarang; Suresh Wadkar – "Hey Bhaskara" – Mee Sindhutai Sapkal; Avadhoot Gupte – "Ganadhisha" – Morya; Sonu Nigam – "Tik Tik Vajate Dokyaat" – Duniyadari; Ajay Gogavale – "Mauli Mauli" – Lai Bhaari; Jasraj Joshi – "Kiti Sangaychay Mala" – Double Seat; Kaustubh Gaikwad & Janardan Khandalkar – "Lagnalu" – Boyz; Ajay Gogavale – "Devak Kayji Re" – Redu; Adarsh Shinde – "Tula Japnar Aahe" – Khari Biscuit	Favourite Singer – Female: Aarya Ambekar – "Hrudayat Vaje Something" – Ti Saddhya Kay Karte; Bela Shende – "Wajle Ki Bara" – Natarang; Bela Shende – "Aaj Mhare Ghar Pavana" – Balgandharva; Urmila Dhangar – "Welcome Ho Raya Welcome" – Deool; Sayali Pankaj – "Tik Tik Vajate Dokyaat" – Duniyadari; Ketaki Mategaonkar – "Mala Ved Laagale" – Timepass; Anandi Joshi – "Kiti Sangaichay Mala" – Double Seat; Shreya Ghoshal – "Aatach Baya Ka Baavarla" – Sairat; Vaishali Samant – "Khandala Ghat" – Ye Re Ye Re Paisa; Ronkini Gupta – "Tula Japnar Aahe" – Khari Biscuit
Favourite Style Icon: Ritesh Deshmukh; Ankush Chaudhari; Aniket Vishwasrao; Swapnil Joshi; Akash Thosar; Amey Wagh	Favourite Face Of The Decade: Sonalee Kulkarni; Kranti Redkar; Ketaki Mategaonkar; Sai Tamhankar; Amruta Khanvilkar; Priya Bapat; Rinku Rajguru; Vaidehi Parashurami; Shivani Surve
