= MFK Award for Favourite Actor =

Indian film award

Maharashtracha Favourite Kon? for Favourite Actor
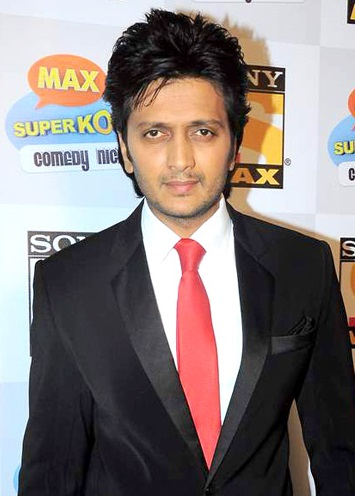
- The 2022 recipient: Riteish Deshmukh for Ved
- Awarded for: Best Performance by an Actor in a Leading Role
- Country: India
- Presented by: Zee Talkies
- First award: Makarand Anaspure, De Dhakka (2009)
- Currently held by: Riteish Deshmukh, Ved (2023)

Maharashtracha Favourite Kon? Award for Favourite Actor is given by Zee Talkies as part of its annual Maharashtracha Favourite Kon? ceremony for Marathi films. The award was first given in 2009.

== Superlatives ==
Superlative	Actor	Record
Actor with most awards	Sachin Khedekar Riteish Deshmukh	3
Actor with most nominations	Sachin Khedekar Ankush Chaudhari; Swapnil Joshi	8
Actor with most consecutive nominations	Sachin Khedekar (2010-2014)	5
Actor with most nominations without ever winning	Bharat Jadhav; Atul Kulkarni; Prathamesh Parab	3
Actor with most nominations in a single year	Sachin Khedekar (2021)	3
Actor with most nominations in a single year	Ankush Chaudhari (2015); Amey Wagh (2017)	2
Oldest winner	Prasad Oak (2022)	48
Oldest nominee	Dilip Prabhavalkar (2014)	70
Youngest winner	Akash Thosar (2016)	23
Youngest nominee	Srinivas Pokle (2018)	8

- With three wins, Sachin Khedekar and Riteish Deshmukh have the most awards. Khedekar also holds the record for most consecutive wins, having won the award for three years in a row from 2010 to 2012.
- Actors who have won both Favourite Actor and Favourite Supporting Actor awards include Ankush Chaudhari, Sachin Khedekar and Prasad Oak.
- Two actors have won the Favourite Actor award for their debut performances: Riteish Deshmukh for Lai Bhaari (2014) and Akash Thosar for Sairat (2016). Other actors who got nominated in this category for their debut performances are Prathamesh Parab for Timepass (2014), Lalit Prabhakar for Chi Va Chi Sau Ka (2017) and Srinivas Pokle for Naal (2018).
- Akash Thosar became the youngest winner of the Favourite Actor award at the age of 23 for Sairat (2016), while Srinivas Pokle became the youngest Favourite Actor nominee in the history of MFK at the age of 8 for Naal (2018).
- Sachin Khedekar has the highest number of consecutive nominations, having been nominated for the award every year from 2010 till 2014; followed by Swapnil Joshi being nominated consecutive four times from 2013 to 2016 and winning the award in 2013 for Duniyadari.
- Ankush Chaudhari and Amey Wagh hold the record for the highest number of Favourite Actor nominations in a single year. Chaudhari has been nominated twice in 2015 and Wagh in 2017.
- Swapnil Joshi, Parth Bhalerao, Prathamesh Parab and Makarand Anaspure are the only actors to be nominated twice for the same role. Joshi achieved this feat twice in the Mumbai-Pune-Mumbai franchise, being nominated for his role as Gautam Pradhan (in 2011 for Mumbai-Pune-Mumbai and in 2016 for Mumbai-Pune-Mumbai 2). Parth Bhalerao was nominated in two consecutive year 2017 and 2018 for his role as Dhungraj in Boyz and Boyz 2. Prathamesh Parab was nominated in 2014 and 2022 for his role as Dagadu Parab in Timepass and Timepass 3 and Makarand Anaspure was nominated in 2009 and 2022 for his role as Makarand Jadhav in De Dhakka and De Dhakka 2, winning in 2009.
- Dagadu Parab is the only character for which two Favourite Actor awards were nominated, both Prathamesh Parab (in 2014 and 2022) and Priyadarshan Jadhav (in 2015) nominated for Timepass.

== Winners and nominees ==
Year	Photos of winners	Actor	Role(s)	Film	Ref.
2009		Makarand Anaspure †	Makarand Jadhav	De Dhakka	
2009		Sachin Pilgaonkar	Mukund (Kandya) Satpute	Amhi Satpute	
2009		Bharat Jadhav	Galgale	Galgale Nighale	
2009		Ankush Chaudhari	Vicky	Uladhaal	
2010		Sachin Khedekar †	Dinkar Bhosale	Me Shivajiraje Bhosale Boltoy	
2010		Atul Kulkarni	Guna Kagalkar	Natarang	
2010		Girish Kulkarni	Mangesh Nadkarni	Gandha	
2010		Upendra Limaye	Tayappa	Jogwa	
2011		Sachin Khedekar †	Shridhar	Taryanche Bait	
2011		Bharat Jadhav	Madhukar Rane	Shikshanachya Aaicha Gho	
2011		Sachit Patil	Arjun	Arjun	
2011		Swapnil Joshi	Gautam Pradhan	Mumbai-Pune-Mumbai	
2011		Subodh Bhave	Balgandharva	Balgandharva	
2012		Sachin Khedekar †	Hari Dada Damle	Kaksparsh	
2012		Girish Kulkarni	Keshav Rambhol	Deool	
2012		Jitendra Joshi	Tukaram	Tukaram	
2012		Bharat Jadhav	Ravi	One Room Kitchen	
2012		Makarand Anaspure	Dattu	Dambis	
2013		Swapnil Joshi †	Shreyas Talwalkar	Duniyadari	
2013		Sachin Pilgaonkar	Arun Deshpande	Ekulti Ek	
2013		Atul Kulkarni	Ram Subramanyam	Premachi Goshta	
2013		Vikram Gokhale	Ratnakar	Anumati	
2013		Sachin Khedekar	Ramchandra Gokhale	Kokanastha	
2014		Riteish Deshmukh †	Prince/Maauli	Lai Bhaari	
2014		Swapnil Joshi	Satyajeet Pathak	Mangalashtak Once More	
2014		Sachin Khedekar	Vyankatesh Kulkarni	Pitruroon	
2014		Mahesh Manjrekar	Pradeep Sharma	Rege	
2014		Prathamesh Parab	Dagadu Parab	Timepass	
2014		Dilip Prabhavalkar	Narba	Narbachi Wadi	
2015		Ankush Chaudhari †	Satya	Classmates	
2015		Ankush Chaudhari	Amit Naik	Double Seat	
2015		Nana Patekar	Prakash Amte	Dr. Prakash Baba Amte – The Real Hero	
2015		Swapnil Joshi	Amar	Pyaar Vali Love Story	
2015		Atul Kulkarni	Niranjan	Happy Journey	
2015		Priyadarshan Jadhav	Dagadu Parab	Timepass 2	
2016		Akash Thosar †	Prashant (Parshya) Kale	Sairat	
2016		Nana Patekar	Ganpat Belvalkar	Natsamrat	
2016		Subodh Bhave	Sadashiv Gurav	Katyar Kaljat Ghusali	
2016		Swapnil Joshi	Gautam Pradhan	Mumbai-Pune-Mumbai 2	
2016		Ankush Chaudhari	Suryakant	Dagadi Chawl	
2017		Amey Wagh †	Banesh Fene	Faster Fene	
2017		Amey Wagh	Alok	Muramba	
2017		Lalit Prabhakar	Satyaprakash	Chi Va Chi Sau Ka	
2017		Ankush Chaudhari	Anurag	Ti Saddhya Kay Karte	
2017		Jitendra Joshi	Prasanna Kamerkar	Ventilator	
2017		Parth Bhalerao	Dhungraj	Boyz	
2018		Subodh Bhave †	Vilas	Pushpak Vimaan	
2018		Parth Bhalerao	Dhungraj	Boyz 2	
2018		Srinivas Pokle	Chaitya	Naal	
2018		Om Bhutkar	Rahul (Rahulya) Patil	Mulshi Pattern	
2018		Bhausaheb Shinde	Baban	Baban	
2019		Lalit Prabhakar †	Gopal Joshi	Anandi Gopal	
2019		Swapnil Joshi	Sunil Kulkarni	Mogra Phulaalaa	
2019		Ankush Chaudhari	Krishna	Triple Seat	
2019		Chinmay Mandlekar	Chhatrapati Shivaji Maharaj	Fatteshikast	
2019		Prathamesh Parab	Thoke	Takatak	
2019		Sanjay Narvekar	Anna	Ye Re Ye Re Paisa 2	
2021		Riteish Deshmukh †	Prince/Maauli	Lai Bhaari	
2021		Sachin Khedekar	Dinkar Bhosale	Me Shivajiraje Bhosale Boltoy	
2021		Sachin Khedekar	Shridhar	Taryanche Bait	
2021		Sachin Khedekar	Hari Dada Damle	Kaksparsh	
2021		Akash Thosar	Prashant (Parshya) Kale	Sairat	
2021		Swapnil Joshi	Shreyas Talwalkar	Duniyadari	
2021		Ankush Chaudhari	Satya	Classmates	
2021		Amey Wagh	Banesh Fene	Faster Fene	
2021		Subodh Bhave	Vilas	Pushpak Vimaan	
2021		Lalit Prabhakar	Gopal Joshi	Anandi Gopal	
2022		Prasad Oak †	Anand Dighe	Dharmaveer	
2022		Adinath Kothare	Daulatrao Deshmane	Chandramukhi	
2022		Amey Wagh	Sudhir Joshi	Zombivli	
2022		Lalit Prabhakar	Vishwas/Jaggu	Zombivli	
2022		Bhau Kadam	Pandu	Pandu	
2022		Sharad Kelkar	Baji Prabhu Deshpande	Har Har Mahadev	
2022		Prathamesh Parab	Dagadu Parab	Timepass 3	
2022		Makarand Anaspure	Makarand Jadhav	De Dhakka 2	
2023		Riteish Deshmukh †	Satya Jadhav	Ved	
2023		Ankush Chaudhari	Shahir Sable	Maharashtra Shahir	
2023		Swapnil Joshi	Aniket	Vaalvi	
2023		Subodh Bhave	Dr. Anshuman	Vaalvi	
2023		Nagraj Manjule	Inspector Raya Patil	Ghar Banduk Biryani	
2023		Ajay Purkar	Tanaji Malusare	Subhedar	
