= MFK Award for Favourite Supporting Actress =

Indian film award

Maharashtracha Favourite Kon? for Favourite Supporting Actress
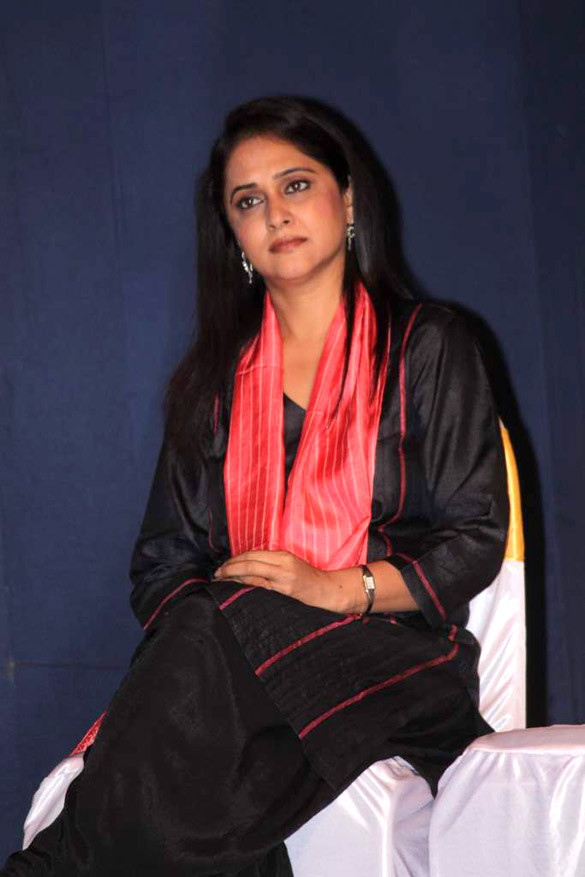
- The 2023 recipient: Mrinal Kulkarni
- Awarded for: Best Performance by an Actress in a Supporting Role
- Country: India
- Presented by: Zee Talkies
- First award: Vishakha Subhedar, Mast Challay Amcha (2011)
- Currently held by: Mrinal Kulkarni, Subhedar (2023)

Maharashtracha Favourite Kon? Award for Favourite Supporting Actress is given by Zee Talkies as part of its annual Maharashtracha Favourite Kon? ceremony for Marathi films, to recognise an outstanding performance by a female actor in a supporting role. Although the awards started in 2009, awards for the Best Supporting Actress category started in 2011.

== Superlatives ==
Superlatives	Actor	Record
Actress with most awards	Mrinal Kulkurni	3
Actress with most nominations	Sai Tamhankar; Mrinal Kulkarni	5
Actress with most nominations	Vishakha Subhedar	4
Actress with most consecutive year nominations	Mrinal Kulkarni (2021-2023)	3
Actress with most nominations without ever winning	Medha Manjrekar; Reema Lagoo; Nandita Patkar; Mrunmayee Deshpande	2

== Winners and nominees ==
Year	Photos of winners	Actor	Role(s)	Film	Ref.
2011		Vishakha Subhedar †	Seema	Mast Challay Amcha	
2011		Veena Jamkar	Manju	Lalbaug Parel	
2011		Jyoti Chandekar	Sindhutai Sapkal	Mee Sindhutai Sapkal	
2012		Savita Malpekar †	Namu Aatya	Kaksparsh	
2012		Medha Manjrekar	Tara Damle	Kaksparsh	
2012		Atisha Naik	Sarpanch	Deool	
2012		Vishakha Subhedar	Mrs. Patil	Yedyanchi Jatra	
2012		Sai Tamhankar	Neha	Zhakaas	
2013		Urmilla Kothare †	Meenakshi Inamdar	Duniyadari	
2013		Reema Lagoo	Ambu	Anumati	
2013		Sai Tamhankar	Neha Sawant	Balak Palak	
2013		Supriya Pilgaonkar	Nandini Deshpande	Ekulti Ek	
2013		Pallavi Joshi		Prem Mhanje Prem Mhanje Prem Asta	
2014		Tanvi Azmi †	Sumitra Devi	Lai Bhaari	
2014		No Other Nominee			
2015		Sai Tamhankar †	Appu	Classmates	
2015		Nandita Patkar	Aai	Elizabeth Ekadashi	
2015		Vandana Gupte	Mrs. Naik	Double Seat	
2015		Urmilla Kothare	Nandini	Pyaar Vali Love Story	
2015		Sharvani Pillai	Gamini	A Paying Ghost	
2016		Chhaya Kadam †	Suman Akka	Sairat	
2016		Sakshi Tanvar	Nabila	Katyar Kaljat Ghusali	
2016		Neha Pendse	Neha Belwalkar	Natsamrat	
2016		Mrunmayee Deshpande	Vidya	Natsamrat	
2016		Asawari Joshi	Neerja	Mumbai Pune Mumbai 2	
2017		Shilpa Tulaskar †	Gayatri Panigrahi	Boyz	
2017		Namrata Sambherao	Rashmi	Ventilator	
2017		Sukanya Kulkarni	Sarika	Ventilator	
2017		Sai Tamhankar	Manju Sabnis	Family Katta	
2017		Reema Lagoo	Aaisaheb	Jaundya Na Balasaheb	
2017		Chinmayi Sumeet	Alok's Mother	Muramba	
2018		Mrinal Kulkarni †	Janhavi Mujumdar	Ye Re Ye Re Paisa	
2018		Vishakha Subhedar	Ranjana	Ye Re Ye Re Paisa	
2018		Mukta Barve	Amla	Aamhi Doghi	
2018		Chhaya Kadam	Chandrakka	Nude	
2018		Gauri Kiran	Smita	Pushpak Vimaan	
2018		Spruha Joshi	Devika	Home Sweet Home	
2019		Mrinal Kulkarni †	Rajmata Jijabai	Fatteshikast	
2019		Neena Kulkarni	Aai	Mogra Phulaalaa	
2019		Nandita Patkar	Mai	Khari Biscuit	
2019		Priya Berde	Aai	Rampaat	
2019		Pallavi Patil	Vrunda	Triple Seat	
2019		Neha Joshi	Reshma	Nashibvaan	
2021		Sai Tamhankar †	Appu	Classmates	
2021		Vishakha Subhedar	Seema	Mast Challay Aamcha	
2021		Savita Malpekar	Namu Aatya	Kaksparsh	
2021		Urmilla Kothare	Meenakshi Inamdar	Duniyadari	
2021		Tanvi Azmi	Sumitra Devi	Lai Bhaari	
2021		Chhaya Kadam	Suman Akka	Sairat	
2021		Shilpa Tulaskar	Gayatri Panigrahi	Boyz	
2021		Mrinal Kulkarni	Janhavi Mujumdar	Ye Re Ye Re Paisa	
2021		Mrinal Kulkarni	Rajmata Jijabai	Fatteshikast	
2022		Snehal Tarde †	Anita Birje	Dharmaveer	
2022		Mrunmayee Deshpande	Damayanti (Dolly) Daulatrao Deshmane	Chandramukhi	
2022		Amruta Khanvilkar	Sonabai Deshpande	Har Har Mahadev	
2022		Medha Manjrekar	Sumati Jadhav	De Dhakka 2	
2022		Mrinal Kulkarni	Rajmata Jijabai	Sher Shivraj	
2022		Trupti Khamkar	Malti	Zombivli	
2023		Mrinal Kulkarni †	Rajmata Jijabai	Subhedar	
2023		Jiya Shankar	Nisha Katkar	Ved	
2023		Anita Date	Avani	Vaalvi	
2023		Deepti Devi	Parvati	Naal 2	
2023		Devika Daftardar	Chaitya's mother	Naal 2	
