= Boyz 4 =

- Theatrical release poster
- Directed by: Vishal Devrukhkar
- Written by: Hrishikesh Koli
- Produced by: Lalasaheb Shinde; Rajendra Shinde; Sanjay Chhabria
- Starring: See below
- Cinematography: Yogesh Koli
- Edited by: Gurunath Patil; Mahesh Killekar
- Music by: Avdhoot Gupte
- Production companies: Everest Entertainment; Supreme Motion Pictures; Ekvira Productions
- Distributed by: Panorama Studios
- Release date: 20 October 2023
- Running time: 134 minutes
- Country: India
- Language: Marathi
- Box office: est.₹4.20 crore (10 days)

Boyz 4 is a 2023 Indian Marathi-language comedy drama film directed by Vishal Devrukhkar, written by Hrishikesh Koli. It is the fourth installment of Boyz franchise. The film is produced by Everest Entertainment and Supreme Motion Pictures. Boyz 4 was theatrically released on 20 October 2023.

== Plot ==
In the film, the journey of degree after school and junior college will begin.

== Cast ==
- Parth Bhalerao as Dhungraj "Dhungya"
- Pratik Lad as Dhairyasheel "Dhairya"
- Sumant Shinde as Kabir Gayatri Panigrahi
- Girish Kulkarni as Madan Bondwe
- Ritika Shrotri as Grace
- Abhinay Berde as Kunal
- Yatin Karyekar as Principal
- Sameer Dharmadhikari
- Gaurav More as Naru
- Nikhil Bane as Kumar
- Jui Bendkhale as Natasha
- Ritooja Shinde as Professor Sofia Shinde
- Om Patil
- Atharva Sudame

== Production ==
This film was announced in the success party of Boyz 3. Sumant Shinde, Parth Bhalerao, and Pratik Lad, who were part of Boyz 3, have been retained, with new cast members including Abhinay Berde, Nikhil Bane, Gaurav More, Ritooja Shinde, and Jui Bendkhale. Additionally, Ritika Shrotri, who appeared in Boyz, also be featured in the film.

== Marketing and release ==
The teaser was released on 28 September 2023, and the trailer on 5 October 2023.

The film was released in theatres on 20 October 2023.

== Reception ==
=== Critical reception ===
A reviewer from The Times of India rated 2.5 out of 5 stars and wrote "A feel good comedy that has no pretentious about it." A reviewer from Urbanly rated 2/5 and wrote "If you have been a fan of the previous parts, this one would disappoint you slightly less, but if you are not a fan don't even think about watching it!"

=== Box Office ===
The film collected around ₹4.20 crore in its first 10 Days.

== Music ==
The music is composed by Avdhoot Gupte and lyrics are provided Hrishikesh Koli. The title song of the film "Boyz Rap Song" was released on 26 September 2023, sung by Pratik Lad, Sumanth Shinde and Parth Bhalerao, along with Gupte. The "Gaav Sutana" song was released on 10 October 2023 sung by Padmanabh Gaikwad, and "Ye Na Rani" was released on 17 October 2023.

Track listing
No.	Title	Lyrics	Music	Singer (s)	Length
1.	"Boyz Rap Song"	Hrishikesh Koli	Avdhoot Gupte	Avdhoot Gupte, Pratik Lad, Sumanth Shinde, Parth Bhalerao	3:57
2.	"Gaav Sutana"	Ganesh Aatmaram Shinde	Avdhoot Gupte	Padmanabh Gaikwad	3:19
3.	"Ye Na Rani"	Avdhoot Gupte	Avdhoot Gupte	Avdhoot Gupte, Vaishali Samant	3:19
