= Salbardi =

2026 Indian Marathi film

- Theatrical release poster
- Directed by: Ramesh Sahebrao Choudhary
- Written by: Ramesh Sahebrao Choudhary; Rohit Shukre
- Produced by: Anil Devde Patil; Dr. Gajanan Jadhav; Rambhau Jadhav
- Starring: Pooja Sawant; Onkar Bhojane; Shashank Shende
- Cinematography: Siddhesh More
- Edited by: Siddhesh More
- Music by: Padmnabh Gaikwad
- Production company: Nebula Films
- Release date: 17 April 2026
- Running time: 145 minutes
- Country: India
- Language: Marathi

Salbardi is a 2026 Indian Marathi-language crime mystery thriller film written and directed by Ramesh Sahebrao Choudhary and produced under the banner of Nebula Films. The film stars Pooja Sawant in the lead role as police inspector, supported by an ensemble cast including Shashank Shende, Bharat Ganeshpure, Anshuman Vichare and Onkar Bhojane. The story revolve around the string of mysterious child murders sends the entire community into a spiral of dread, suspicion and superstition.

The film was theatrically released on 17 April 2026 across Maharashtra.

== Plot ==
The village of Salbardi, a quiet and remote settlement in Maharashtra, is plunged into fear when young boys, each the only child of their parents and all below the age of ten, begin going missing one by one, only to be found dead.

Police Inspector Manorama Pradhan is assigned to investigate the killings. Determined and sharp-witted, she arrives in the village and begins methodically working through the case despite mounting resistance, both from locals whose beliefs are steeped in superstition and from political power brokers who would rather the truth remain buried. Her investigation leads her to the dark interior of an old mansion, where she begins unravelling a dangerous web of power games, deep-rooted superstitious beliefs, and shocking revelations that expose the true nature of the village's influential elite.

When the mystery is finally solved, the culprits and their accomplices are brought to justice, but not before the investigation forces a reckoning with the ugliness that silence, corruption, and fear can breed within a tight-knit community.

== Cast ==
- Pooja Sawant as Police officer Manorama Pradhan
- Shashank Shende as Ganpat Patil
- Bharat Ganeshpure as MLA Zunzarrao Mohite
- Onkar Bhojane as Mukunda Thorat
- Anshuman Vichare as Balu Joshi
- Pravin Dalimbkar as Ganpat Kamble
- Chittaranjan Giri as Pimpalya
- Madhav Abhyankar as Guardian Minister Padmaraj Shelar
- Anik Nagarkar as Police Inspector Tambe
- Tushar Nagargoje as Police Inspector Lokhande
- Rohit Kokate as Kotkar Guruji
- Kamlakar Satpute as Bhandari Sheth
- Abhay Gite as Kanakraj Taksale
- Rajendra Satardekar as Fr. John Chandekar
- Sarvesh Kadam as Rushabh, Manorama's son
- Usha Chavan as maid Yesubai
- Vedant Choudhary as Kanha, maid Yesubai's son
- Ramdas Golhar as Tukaram Sheth
- Pankaj Pacharya as Aabajaan
- Gashmeer Mahajani in a special appearance in the song "Jagdambe"
- Sonalee Kulkarni in a special appearance in the song "Manjula"

== Soundtrack ==
The film's music was composed by Padmanabh Gaikwad, with background score by Amar Mohile.

No.	Title	Lyrics	Singer(s)	Length
1.	"Jagdambe"	Mukund Bhalerao	Ajay Gogavale	4:18
2.	"Manjula"	Guru Thakur	Aanandi Joshi	3:35
3.	"Nij Re – Angai Song"	Mukund Bhalerao	Javed Ali	5:12
4.	"Theme Song"	Mukund Bhalerao	Padmanabh Gaikwad	3:17
5.	"Nij Re – Male Version"	Mukund Bhalerao	Padmanabh Gaikwad	5:11
6.	"Nij Re – Female Version"	Mukund Bhalerao	Surabhi Khekale	5:15
Total length:				26:48

== Release and reception ==
Salbardi was officially announced in January 2026 and released theatrically on 17 April 2026. The film's teaser was released on 2 March 2026, followed by the official trailer on 4 April 2026, both of which generated attention on social media. Its box office opening was reportedly poor, with limited theatrical shows. The film was later released on Amazon Prime Video in mid-May 2026.

=== Critical response ===
Critical reception for Salbardi was mixed to negative. While Pooja Sawant's lead performance was widely praised across reviews, the screenplay and direction were criticized for lacking engagement and emotional depth.

Santosh Bhingarde of Sakal gave the film 3 out of 5 stars and wrote, "The director has shown in this story that despite how advanced science is today, the habit of superstition is still rooted in villages." Sujit Shirke of Lokmat also awarded 3 out of 5 stars, stating that "Salbardi succeeds in creating interest due to the acting of the actors"
