= Killa (film) =

2015 Indian film

- Theatrical release poster
- Directed by: Avinash Arun
- Written by: Tushar Paranjape
- Produced by: Nishant Roy Bombarde; Alan McAlex; Vishesh Agrawal; Sajid Mansuri; Akshay M. Musle; Madhukar R. Musle; Ajay Rai
- Starring: Archit Devadhar; Parth Bhalerao; Gaurish Gawade; Atharva Upasni; Amruta Subhash
- Cinematography: Avinash Arun
- Edited by: Charu Shree Roy
- Music by: Naren Chandavakar; Benedict Taylor
- Production company: Essel Vision Productions
- Distributed by: JAR Pictures
- Release dates: 11 February 2014 (Berlin International Film Festival); 26 June 2015 (theatrical)
- Running time: 107 minutes
- Country: India
- Language: Marathi
- Box office: ₹10 crore (US$1.0 million)

Killa (English: The Fort) is an Indian Marathi-language drama film directed by Avinash Arun. The film revolves around an 11-year-old seventh grade boy struggling to cope with the death of his father and his journey into coming of age.

The film was selected for the 64th Berlin International Film Festival where it won the Crystal Bear by the Children's Jury in the Generation KPlus Selection. At the 62nd National Film Awards in March 2015, the film won the Best Feature Film in Marathi award. The actor Parth Bhalerao received Special Mention for his role in this film and Bhoothnath Returns. The film was released on 26 June 2015.

== Cast ==
- Archit Devadhar as Chinmay Kale
- Parth Bhalerao as Bandya/Suhas
- Gaurish Gawade as Prince/Yuvraj
- Atharva Upasni as Omkar
- Amruta Subhash as Aruna Kale
- Savita Prabhune as Mrs. Nivte
- Jui

== Plot ==
An 11-year-old seventh grade Indian boy who has just lost his father is forced to adapt to a new school in a small village in Konkan, after his mother is transferred from the city of Pune. The story is about how he copes with his transformation and coming of age on a day by day basis. It is also about the pressures that his mother has to deal with, both as a single mother and at work.

== Setting and filming locations ==
The film is set in a village on the Konkan coast of Maharashtra, not far from Ratnagiri, with mentions of Pune as the city they just moved from, and Satara as the town they are moving to at the end of the film.

The fort shown in the film is Vijaydurg Fort in Sindhudurg district. The lighthouse is Jaigad Lighthouse, and general filming takes place in villages in this district. The racing track shown for cycling is near Ganpatipule and the other scenes are shot in Guhagar, Vijaydurga, Palshet, and Pune (as shown in list of locations in movie).

== Production ==
The idea for Killa came to Avinash Arun when he was in the FTII and his father kept having to be transferred from job to job. Arun had a difficult time finding work as a cinematographer. So he decided to pitch his idea to a fellow student Tushar Paranjape, who ended up turning it into a full script. When Indian indie production company JAR Pictures showed desire to fund independent cinema from up-and-coming directors, Avinash Arun told them about his story in March 2013. The company decided to greenlight the project, and it went into production after four months.

== Release ==
The movie was released in Maharashtra, Karnataka, Gujarat, Madhya Pradesh, Goa on 26 June 2015 in 225 screens. It was released in France (as La forteresse) on 7 October 2015 and in Sweden (as Fortet) at the Göteborg Film Festival in January 2015.

== Awards ==
Award/Festival	Category	Result
62nd National Film Awards	Best Feature Film in Marathi	Won
62nd National Film Awards	Special Mention (Feature Film) for Parth Bhalerao	Won
Berlin Film Festival	Crystal Bear - Best Film Generation KPlus Section	Won
Berlin Film Festival	Special Mention - Generation KPlus Section	Won
Asia Pacific Screen Awards	Best Youth Feature Film	Nominated
