= Lai Bhaari =

2014 Indian film by Nishikant Kamat

- Theatrical release poster
- Directed by: Nishikant Kamat
- Screenplay by: Ritesh Shah
- Story by: Sajid Nadiadwala
- Produced by: Genelia D'Souza; Jeetendra Thackeray; Ameya Khopkar
- Starring: Riteish Deshmukh; Tanvi Azmi; Uday Tikekar; Sharad Kelkar; Radhika Apte; Aaditi Pohankar
- Cinematography: Sanjay K. Memane
- Edited by: Aarif Sheikh
- Music by: Ajay–Atul
- Production companies: Mumbai Film Company; Cinemantra Production
- Distributed by: Zee Talkies; Essel Vision
- Release date: 11 July 2014
- Country: India
- Language: Marathi
- Budget: ₹7 crore
- Box office: ₹41–48 crore

Lai Bhaari (meaning: Overwhelming or Awesome) is a 2014 Indian Marathi-language action drama film directed by Nishikant Kamat. The film marks the debut of Riteish Deshmukh in Marathi cinema, while Salman Khan and Genelia D'Souza make cameo appearances. It was the first Marathi that was made on such a big scale, and became the highest grossing Marathi film during that time. It was declared a blockbuster at the box office.

On 25 January 2015 Lai Bhaari broke all previous records and got the highest television viewership for any film in Maharashtra (Marathi – Hindi) with 5727 TVTs.

It is remade in Odia as Jaga Hatare Pagha starring Anubhav Mohanty. It ran for more than 100 days in Maharashtra. At Maharashtracha Favourite Kon? Film Won MFK Award for Favourite Film, MFK Award for Favourite Actor, MFK Award for Favourite Villain, MFK Award for Favourite Supporting Actress, MFK Award for Favourite Singer Male.

== Plot ==
Pratap Singh Nimbalkar (Uday Tikekar) and his wife Sumitra Devi (Tanvi Azmi) are known for their social work like helping poor farmers by giving them land and shelter. Even though they are blessed by everyone, Sumitra Devi is insulted for not having a child even though she has been married for 9 years. Her maid suggests her to pray to Lord Vithoba (generally known as Vitthal by most common people of Maharashtra) in Pandharpur, a holy place in Maharashtra. Out of eagerness, Sumitra Devi promises to give her first son to Lord Vitthal.

As fate would have it, she gets pregnant soon and confirms the good news to Pratap Singh. But when she tells him that she has promised Lord Vithhal to give him her first child, Pratap Singh, who is modern in thought, says all this is ridiculous and flies off to London. When the baby is born, and Sumitra Devi calls up Pratap Singh and tells him that she is now convinced of keeping the baby. He comes back as soon as possible and names the baby Abhay Singh, or Prince, as a nickname.

25 years later, Prince (Riteish Deshmukh) comes back home after studying abroad. On the other hand, there is Prince's paternal cousin Sangram (Sharad Kelkar) is a crooked guy, who is trying to take all farms from the farmers by torturing them. On hearing this, Pratap Singh warns him for doing so. A few days later, Pratap Singh is killed and it is implied that Sangram was behind his death.

Seeing Prince as the only obstacle left in his plan of owning all the farms in the village. He hires Nandini (Aaditi Pohankar) secretary of Pratap Singh to cheat Prince. In her love Prince signs the property papers and Sangram starts harassing the people. When Prince asks him that he was warned then Sangram shows the papers Prince claim them artificial and was going to the collector Sangram subsequently kills Prince by crashing truck to Prince's car and takes over all the property that belonged to Pratap Singh. Seeing no way left, Sumitra Devi goes to Pandharpur and angrily prays to Lord Vitthal to give back her son. Right outside the temple, Mauli (Riteish Deshmukh), a lookalike of Prince, beats up some goons who were eve teasing.

It is revealed that 25 years ago, Sumitra Devi had given birth to twins, one of which she gave to Lord Vitthal. And this son is none other than Mauli, a rowdy, as opposed to the gentleman Prince. How Mauli takes revenge from Sangram forms the crux of the story.

== Cast ==
- Riteish Deshmukh as Mauli and Abhay Singh Nimbalkar 'Prince', the sons of Sumitra Devi and Pratap Singh
- Sharad Kelkar as Sangram, Mauli's first cousin
- Radhika Apte as Kavita, Mauli's love interest
- Tanvi Azmi as Sumitra Devi Nimbalkar
- Uday Tikekar as Pratap Singh Nimbalkar
- Sanjay Khapare as Sakha, Mauli and Prince's friend
- Mrunal Jadhav as Renuka, Sakha's daughter.
- Aaditi Pohankar as Nandini, Prince's love interest
- Amita Khopkar as Sakha's mother
- Mousami Tondwalkar as Sakha's wife
- Rajesh Shisatkar as Lawyer
- Pranav Raorane as Sakha's friend
- Yogesh Shirsat as Sakha's friend
- Rajesh Bhosale as Mauli's friend

=== Cameo appearance ===
- Genelia D'Souza in the song "Aala Holicha San")
- Salman Khan as Bhau

== Production ==
With a budget of ₹8 crore (US$830,000), Lai Bhaari is one of the most expensive Marathi films till date. It has been produced by Jeetendra Thackeray, Ameya Khopkar and Genelia Deshmukh under Cinemantra Production and Mumbai Film Company production banner and it is presented by Zee Talkies and Essel Vision.

This movie marks the third instalment of Ritesh Deshmukh in Marathi after his produced two successful Marathi films Balak-Palak and Yellow.

== Soundtrack ==
The music was composed by Ajay–Atul and released by Video Palace. The song "Mauli Mauli" become one of the most popular Marathi songs at that time.

Lai Bhaari

Soundtrack album by Ajay–Atul
- Released: May 28, 2014
- Recorded: 2014
- Genre: Soundtrack
- Length: 25:39
- Label: Video Palace
- Producer: Ajay–Atul

Ajay–Atul chronology
Fandry (2014)	Lai Bhaari (2014)	PK (2014)

Track list
No.	Title	Lyrics	Singer(s)	Length
1.	"Mauli Mauli"	Guru Thakur	Ajay Gogavale	5:07
2.	"New Nava Tarana"	Ajay–Atul	Kunal Ganjawala	4:52
3.	"Jeev Bhulala"	Guru Thakur	Sonu Nigam, Shreya Ghoshal	4:44
4.	"Aala Holicha Sar Lai Bhari"	Guru Thakur	Swapnil Bandodkar, Yogita Godbole Pathak	5:23
5.	"Ye Na Saajna"	Guru Thakur	Shreya Ghoshal	5:33
Total length:				25:39

== Reception ==
The film has received highly positive reviews. Rediff gave 4 out of 5 stars and declared movie awesome. Bollywoodlife and Koimoi have rated the movie 3 stars out of 5 .Times of India gave the movie a rating of 3.5/5.

== Box office ==
Lai Bhaari opened to packed houses all over and grossed around ₹3.1 crore (US$320,000) on the first day, ₹3.6 crore (US$370,000) on the first Saturday and ₹3.85 crore (US$400,000) on its first Sunday, taking the first weekend collections to ₹10.55 crore (US$1.1 million) in Maharashtra alone.

== See also ==
- Highest grossing Marathi films
- List of most expensive Indian films
