= Girlz =

- Theatrical release poster
- Directed by: Vishal Devrukhkar
- Written by: Hrishikesh Koli
- Produced by: Naren Kumar
- Starring: Ankita Lande; Devika Daftardar; Ketaki Narayan
- Cinematography: Siddartha Jatla
- Edited by: Guru Patil; Mahesh Killekar
- Music by: Praful–Swapnil; Samir Saptiskar
- Production companies: Everest Entertainment; Kyra Kumar Kreations
- Distributed by: 52 Friday Talkies
- Release date: 29 November 2019
- Running time: 136 minutes
- Country: India
- Language: Marathi

Girlz is a 2019 Indian Marathi-language comedy-drama film directed by Vishal Devrukhkar, from the story and screenplay by Hrishikesh Koli. It is produced by Everest Entertainment and Kyra Kumar Kreations. The film stars Ankita Lande, Devika Daftardar, and Ketaki Narayan in the main roles.

== Cast ==
- Ankita Lande as Mati Desai
- Devika Daftardar as Meena Desai, Mati's mother
- Ketaki Narayan as Maggie
- Parth Bhalerao as Sadashiv "Sada" Dhole Patil
- Anvita Phaltankar as Rumi
- Atul Kale as Jimmy
- Nikhil Chavan as Aditya
- Vaishnavi Ambavane as Rohini
- Kishori Ambiye as Frida
- Sulabha Arya as Granny
- Rajshree Autade as Soniya
- Onkar Bhojane as Rajdeep
- Swanand Kirkire as the police officer (special appearance)
- Aarti Chande as Nikita Desai
- Kalpesh Chavan as Pintya
- Amol Deshmukh as Baba
- Archana Kelkar as Rumi's mother
- Sameer Deshpande as Amod
- Sumant Shinde in a special appearance in song "Swag Mazya Fatyavar"
- Pratik Lad in a special appearance in song "Swag Mazya Fatyavar"

== Marketing and release ==
The film was announced in mid-August 2019 with a scheduled release date of 15 November 2019. The first look poster, which showcased three girls facing away from the audience as they prepared to remove their clothes against a beach backdrop, was released on 9 October 2019. On 11 October 2019, Vishal Devrukhkar revealed character posters for Ankita Lande and Ketaki Narayan. The trailer was launched on 17 October 2019 on social media.

The film was theatrically released on 29 November 2019.

== Reception ==
Aay Parchure of Lokmat awarded 3 stars out of 5 stars, praises director Vishal Devrukhkar and writer Hrishikesh Koli for their innovative and humorous approach in the film. He commend the unique dialogues, the standout performances by the lead actresses, and the overall quality of the music. Rishabh Deb of The Times of India awarded 2.5 stars out of 5 stars and wrote "The filmmaker has beautifully captured the finer nuances of the story through Mati's experiences, be it of wearing a bikini or breaking down when her mom constantly calls her in Goa, The film captures such small moments of an innocent girl's journey of discovering life." Ganesh Matkari of Mumbai Mirror awarded 2.5 stars, he critiquing the film for being contradictory. Despite its attempts to present a modern message about freedom and individuality, it ultimately reinforces a traditional belief that parents' advice is paramount, which undermines its central theme and makes the ending seem preachy and ineffective.
