= Lathe Joshi =

Indian Marathi language film

Lathe joshi
- Directed by: Mangesh Joshi
- Story by: Mangesh Joshi
- Produced by: Sonali Joshi; Mangesh Joshi
- Starring: Chittaranjan Giri; Ashwini Giri; Om Bhutkar; Seva Chouhan
- Cinematography: Satyajeet Shobha Shreeram
- Edited by: Makarand Dambhare
- Release dates: October 2016 (MAMI); 13 July 2018
- Running time: 104 minutes
- Country: India
- Language: Marathi

Lathe Joshi is a 2016 Marathi-language drama film directed by Mangesh Joshi and produced by Amol Kagne, Mangesh Joshi, Sonali Joshi and Laxman Kagne.

== Cast ==
- Chittaranjan Giri as Lathe Joshi
- Ashwini Giri
- Seva Chouhan
- Om Bhutkar
- Gouri Konge

== Plot ==
Joshi, known as Lathe Joshi for his skilled work on lathe machine, is left without a job when the owner of the workshop has to close the business due to advances in automation.

== Soundtrack ==
=== Track listing ===
No.	Title	Lyrics	Music	Singer(s)	Length
1.	"Ek Machine"	Vaibhav Joshi	Narendra Bhide	Jaydeep Vaidya	3.13
2.	"Yantrachi Dharma"	Vaibhav Joshi	Narendra Bhide	Sumeet Raghavan	3.12

== Awards ==
- South Asia International Film Festival, Singapore.
- Kazan International Film Festival, Russia.
- Bangalore International Film Festival, 2017.
- Pune International Film Festival, 2017.
