= Bhoothnath Returns =

2014 Indian film by Nitesh Tiwari

- Theatrical release poster
- Directed by: Nitesh Tiwari
- Written by: Story and Script: Nitesh Tiwari; Piyush Gupta; Additional Script: Shreyas Jain; Nikhil Mehrotra
- Produced by: Bhushan Kumar; Krishan Kumar; Renu Ravi Chopra
- Starring: Amitabh Bachchan; Parth Bhalerao; Boman Irani; Usha Jadhav; Sanjay Mishra; Brijendra Kala; Usha Nadkarni
- Cinematography: Kamaljeet Negi
- Edited by: Chandrashekhar Prajapati
- Music by: Songs: Ram Sampath; Yo Yo Honey Singh; Palash Muchhal; Meet Bros Anjjan; Background Score: Hitesh Sonik
- Production companies: T-Series Films; B.R. Films
- Distributed by: AA Films
- Release date: 11 April 2014
- Running time: 155 minutes
- Country: India
- Language: Hindi
- Budget: ₹32 crore
- Box office: ₹60.32 crore

Bhoothnath Returns (transl. Lord of ghosts returns) is a 2014 Indian Hindi-language supernatural political comedy film directed by Nitesh Tiwari and produced by Bhushan Kumar. A sequel to the 2008 film Bhoothnath, the film revolves around Bhoothnath (Amitabh Bachchan) who is mocked in a Bhoothworld for his inability to scare children before being sent back to Earth to redeem himself. The film was released on 11 April 2014 to positive reviews from critics.

The Election Commission of India demanded tax-free status for Bhoothnath Returns, stating, "The state governments should support the strong social message that emanates from the film. Granting tax-free status to this film would make people aware of their rights as voters, like making voter ID cards or not treating polling day as a holiday". The Uttar Pradesh government has declared tax-free status to film on 30 April 2014.

Bhoothnath Returns: The Game, an election mobile video game developed by Vroovy (a joint venture of Hungama and Gameshastra) was also released as a tie-in item to the film.

== Plot ==
The story continues from the previous film.

Kailash Nath, also known as Bhoothnath, enters the Bhoothworld, where he is mocked and questioned about his abilities as a ghost, as he was unsuccessful in scaring any children. To redeem himself, he returns to India, where he tries his best to scare children but is unsuccessful, as the children have become strong physically, mentally and verbally. However, a boy named Akhrot can see him in his true form. Akhrot is not scared of Bhoothnath, but helps him scare a few children; in return, he asks Bhoothnath to act scared of him and to run away from a haunted house while he chants mantras in front of the children, so that they can accept him on their cricket team.

Bhoothnath decides to help Akhrot further by helping him earn money by giving ghosts living in under-construction high-rises peace by fulfilling the wishes that kept them on Earth as ghosts; in the process, they come to know why the ghosts died and help their families get insurance money by scaring corrupt insurance officers, further learning about Bhau, a former criminal who is now a corrupt politician. Seeing the extent of corruption in India, and encouraged by Akhrot, Bhoothnath decides to contest the upcoming elections. Soon, the rivalry between Bhoothnath and Bhau intensifies, to the extent that Bhoothnath sacrifices his powers to win. One day before the elections, a rally is to be held by Bhoothnath to encourage a high turnout on election day. Bhau's men threaten to kill Akhrot unless he prevents the rally from taking place, but Akhrot refuses and is prepared to face the consequences.

On the day of the rally, Bhau's men grievously injure Akhrot for his non-compliance, which causes Bhoothnath to leave his rally to attend to Akhrot in hospital. He goes to the Bhoothworld and begs for Akhrot's life. They tell him that if Bhoothnath wins the election, they will spare Akhrot's life. Meanwhile, Bhau uses Bhoothnath's absence from the rally to his advantage and tries to persuade the audience to vote for him. However, on election day, the majority of the public votes for Bhoothnath. The next day, Bhootnath sees Akhrot's heartbeat rising and realises that he won the election. The film ends with Akhrot regaining consciousness and everybody celebrating Bhoothnath's success.

== Cast ==
- Amitabh Bachchan as Kailash Nath a.k.a. Bhoothnath
- Boman Irani as Bhau Sahib
- Parth Bhalerao as Akhrot
- Usha Jadhav as Bindia Pathak
- Sanjay Mishra as Mishti Baihud
- Kamlesh Sawant as Police Inspector
- Brijendra Kala as Lallan
- Usha Nadkarni as Lalita
- Kurush Deboo as Psychiatrist
- Gajraj Rao as Bade Sahaab
- Subrat Dutta as Engineer Ghost Nikhil Shrivastav
- Vijay Maurya as the ghost of a commoner
- Ajay Jadhav as Constable Shinde

Cameo appearances

- Shah Rukh Khan as Aditya "Adi" Sharma
- Ranbir Kapoor as himself
- Anurag Kashyap as himself
- Aman Siddiqui as Aman "Banku" Sharma (archive footage from previous film)

== Soundtrack ==
Bhoothnath Returns

Soundtrack album by Palash Muchhal, Meet Bros Anjjan, Ram Sampath & Yo Yo Honey Singh
- Released: 28 March 2014
- Genre: Feature film soundtrack
- Length: 27:02
- Language: Hindi
- Label: T-Series
External audio
- Audio Jukebox on YouTube

The film score was composed by Hitesh Sonik while the songs featured in the film were composed by Ram Sampath, Meet Bros Anjjan and Palash Muchhal. Yo Yo Honey Singh also composed one promotional song for the film which marked his first collaboration with Amitabh Bachchan.

Song	Singer	Composer	Lyrics	length
"Party To Banti Hai"	Meet Bros Anjjan and Mika Singh	Palash Muchhal and Meet Bros Anjjan	Kumaar	4:19
"Har Har Gange"	Aman Trikha	Ram Sampath	Kunwar Juneja	3:13
"Party with the Bhoothnath"	Yo Yo Honey Singh	Yo Yo Honey Singh	Yo Yo Honey Singh	5:21
"Sahib"	Rituraj Mohanty	Ram Sampath	Munna Dhiman	4:21
"Dharavi Rap"	Parth Bhalerao & Anish	Ram Sampath	Nitesh Tiwari	2:32
"Party Toh Banti Hai" (Remix)	Mika Singh	Mika Singh	Kumaar	3:39
"Har Har Gange" (Remix)	Aman Trikha	Ram Sampath remixed by DJ Kiran	Kunwar Juneja	3:38

== Critical reception ==
Taran Adarsh from Bollywood Hungama gave the movie 3.5 stars and said that "Bhoothnath Returns is made with noble intentions and the message it conveys resonates in the second hour". Suprateek Chatterejee from First Post called it "a must watch for kids" and found that its "shamelessly manipulative moments are tempered with deliberate humour". A Filmfare reviewer found that the "strength of this film is in its writing" and praised Amitabh Bachchan for his performance whilst giving the movie 3 stars. Rohit Khilnani of India Today, gave the movie 3.5/5 stars and said, "There is no doubt that Bhoothnath will entertain cine-goers. It's entertainment, Bachchan style!"

== Box office ==
Bhoothnath returns collected ₹30 crore (equivalent to ₹52 crore or US$5.6 million in 2026) domestic and ₹2 crore (equivalent to ₹3.5 crore or US$370,000 in 2026) overseas(as of 20 April 2014). Satellite rights of the film is sold to Sony for ₹21 crore (equivalent to ₹37 crore or US$3.9 million in 2026); made it a good profitable venture for producers.

The film that released in over 1,300 theatres saw a "grand" opening of 93% collecting ₹3.25 crore (equivalent to ₹5.7 crore or US$610,000 in 2026)—₹3.5 crore (equivalent to ₹6.1 crore or US$650,000 in 2026) on its first day with stiff competition from the film Disco Singh. With a growth of 60% over its first day collection, it collected ₹5.5 crore (equivalent to ₹9.6 crore or US$1.0 million in 2026) on its second day. After the completion of the films' first weekend, it managed a "fair" collection of ₹16.5 crore (equivalent to ₹29 crore or US$3.1 million in 2026). It collected around ₹4 crore (equivalent to ₹7.0 crore or US$750,000 in 2026) and ₹1.75 crore (equivalent to ₹3.1 crore or US$330,000 in 2026)—₹2 crore (equivalent to ₹3.5 crore or US$370,000 in 2026) on its first Monday and Tuesday respectively, totalling ₹22.5 crore (equivalent to ₹39 crore or US$4.2 million in 2026) over the first five days of its release. After a good growth on Monday, it saw a slide in its collections over the next few days to end up collecting ₹26 crore (equivalent to ₹45 crore or US$4.8 million in 2026) in its first week.
