= Om Bhutkar =

Indian actor (born 1991)

- Born: 1 March 1991 (age 35); Pune, Maharashtra, India
- Education: Brihan Maharashtra College of Commerce, Pune
- Occupations: Actor; writer; poet; playwright; lyricist
- Years active: 2004–present
- Spouse: Prerna Sethia (m. 2026)

Om Bhutkar (born 1 March 1991) is an Indian actor who works in Marathi cinema and occasionally in Hindi cinema. Bhutkar's breakthrough came with his role in Mulshi Pattern, but his debut was in the 2004 Hindi film Chhota Sipahi, for which he earned a National Film Award in the "Best Child Artist" category. He is also known for his theatre show called 'Sukhan', which is a mehfil of Urdu literature & Hindustani music. He is also a poet who writes in Urdu by the pen name 'Maghloob', as well as in Marathi.

== Career ==
He made his film debut with the film Chhota Sipahi, for which he won the National Film Award. In 2018, He gained recognition from the crime film Mulshi Pattern, also made appearance in Nude. Bhutkar has played various roles in the critically acclaimed films like Deool (2011), Faster Fene (2017), Ajoba (2014), Lathe Joshi (2016).

In 2023, he featured in Anup Jagdale's Ravrambha, a period romance film. Also played role of Sane Guruji in Shyamchi Aai in same year. Shyamachi Aai won Best Marathi Film in 71st National Film Awards 2023.

== Filmography ==
=== Films ===
All movies are in Marathi, unless mentioned.

Key
†	Denotes films that have not yet been released

==== As actor ====
Year	Film	Role	Notes
2004	Chhota Sipahi	Joze	Hindi film; Debut
2009	Ek Cup Chya		
2011	Deool	Yuvri	
2012	Masala		
2012	Chintoo	Akki	
2013	Astu	Ram	
2013	Pitruroon		
2014	Ajoba	Shiva Kamble	
2015	Highway		
2016	Lathe Joshi	Son	
2017	Zindagi Virat	Santya	
2017	Faster Fene	Dhanesh	
2018	Barayan	D Bhai	
2018	Nude	Jairam	
2018	Lost And Hound	Sameer Malik	Short film
2018	Naal	Mama	
2018	Mulshi Pattern	Rahul Saka Patil	Remade in Hindi as Antim: The Final Truth
2019	Kahani Mitra Ki	Dalvi	Hindi film
2020	Bappache Gharich Visarjan Surakshit Visarjan		Short film
2023	Ravrambha	Ravji	
2023	Shyamchi Aai	Sane Guruji	
2025	Ata Thambaycha Naay!	Mali Sir	
2026	Deool Band 2	Shankar Maharaj	
2026	Tumbadchi Manjula	Keshav	
TBA	Khashaba †		
TBA	Macho †		

==== As writer ====
- The Golden Harvest (2022)
- Benwad (2022)
- Re-Discovery (2024)

=== Plays ===
- Mi...Ghalib (Marathi-Urdu)
- Vitha (Marathi - based on the journey of Vithabai Narayangaonkar)
- Manaswini Murder Case (Marathi)

=== Theatre Shows ===
- Sukhan (A mehfil of Urdu literature & Hindustani Music)

== Awards ==
Year	Award	Category	Nominated work	Result	Ref(s)
2004	National Film Awards	Best Child Artist	Chhota Sipahi	Won	
2019	Zee Chitra Gaurav	Best Actor in	Mulshi Pattern	Won	
