= Boyz 2 =

- Theatrical release poster
- Directed by: Vishal Devrukhkar
- Written by: Hrishikesh Koli
- Produced by: Lalasaheb Shinde; Rajendra Shinde; Sanjay Chhabria
- Starring: Sumant Shinde; Parth Bhalerao; Pratik Lad; Sayli Patil; Shubhangi Tambale; Onkar Bhojane
- Cinematography: Siddartha Jatla
- Edited by: Gurunath Patil; Mahesh Killekar
- Music by: Avdhoot Gupte
- Production companies: Everest Entertainment; Supreme Motion Pictures; Ekvira Productions; L. V. Shinde Group
- Distributed by: Eros International
- Release date: 5 October 2018
- Running time: 132 minutes
- Country: India
- Language: Marathi
- Box office: est.₹16 crore

Boyz 2 is a 2018 Indian Marathi-language comedy drama film directed by Vishal Devrukhkar and written by Hrishikesh Koli. The second installment of Boyz franchise. It is jointly produced by Everest Entertainment and Supreme Motion Pictures, distributed by Eros International. Boyz 2 was theatrically released on 5 October 2018 worldwide.

== Plot ==
The film begins exactly two years after the events of Boyz. Kabir has undergone a massive personality change after his mother's death and friendship with Dhungya and Dhairya, and now spends a lot of time on social media. Living with his aunt Radhika and her live-in partner Alok, he detests their non-marital relationship. He is often traumatized by the ragging he faced from the college seniors in the boys hostel. As a result, he plans to opt out of hostel to focus on his studies in 12th Std. Meanwhile Dhungya and Dhairya are still indulging in their usual mischief.

Naru Bondwe, son of college trustee Madan Bondwe, rejoins the college and has a rivalry with Juniors. Dharia, Dhungya and Kabir are known for fighting for the rights of juniors. But Kabir now stays away from the hostel because he doesn't want anything else. Seniors are troubled by the 12th board exams. A grade committee will visit the college during the year and tutor Vikram Sabnis, the principal, to end the enmity between juniors and seniors. Chitra A beautiful girl enters the college and Kabir is attracted and goes back to the hostel. The rivalry between juniors and seniors takes a turn for the worse before the grade committee meets. Naru and Kabir, the chosen members of both the teams, must give up their virginity to the girl. And record videos as evidence that failed. The loser has to leave the college.

== Cast ==
- Sumant Shinde as Kabir
- Parth Bhalerao as Dhungya
- Sayli Patil as Chitra
- Pratik Lad as Dairya
- Onkar Bhojane as Naru sheth
- Girish Kulkarni as Madan Bondwe
- Shubhangi Tambale as Swati
- Akshata Padgaonkar as Shalaka
- Sharvari Jamenis as Radhika
- Kishori Ambiye as Chandru
- Jaywant Wadkar as Gopi Anna
- Amitriyaan as Vikram Sabnis
- Rohit Chavan as Sada
- Soham Kalokhe as Lakha Seth
- Yatin Karyekar as Principal
- Ritika Shrotri as Grace (uncredited role)
- Pallavi Patil as Devika
- Shilpa Tulaskar as Gayatri Panigrahi (uncredited role)

== Production ==
Boyz 2 is produced by Everest Entertainment and Avdhoot Gupte under the banner of Supreme Motion Pictures and distributed by Eros International. The filming took place in Pune and Leh, Ladakh.

== Release ==
Boyz 2 was theatrically released on 5 October 2018 worldwide.

== Soundtrack ==
Boyz 2

Soundtrack album by Avdhoot Gupte
- Released: 3 October 2018
- Genre: Feature film soundtrack
- Length: 18:41
- Language: Marathi
- Label: Everest Entertainment

Avdhoot Gupte chronology
Ranangan (2018)	Boyz 2 (2018)	Sarva Line Vyasta Ahet (2019)

Official audio
- Boyz 2 - Full Album on YouTube

Music is composed by Avdhoot Gupte and songs are recorded by Adarsh Shinde and Rohit Raut.

All music is composed by Avdhoot Gupte.

Track listing
No.	Title	Lyrics	Singer(s)	Length
1.	"Goti Soda Batli Foda"	Avdhoot Gupte	Adarsh Shinde, Rohit Raut	4:11
2.	"Tod Fod"	Hrishikesh Koli	Mugdha Karhade, Ganesh Chandanshiv, Prasenjeet Kosambi	4:33
3.	"Shona"	Mandar Cholkar	Rohit Raut, Juilee Joglekar	2:47
4.	"Rakh Jara"	Hrishikesh Koli	Avdhoot Gupte	2:49
5.	"Ghal Ghal"	Avdhoot Gupte	Avdhoot Gupte	2:50
Total length:				18:41

== Reception ==
=== Critical reception ===
Mayuri Phadnis of The Times of India gave 3 out of 5 stars, praised the performances and criticised the film's story which is predictable. Prajakta Chitnis of Lokmat rated 3/5 wrote that the director has taken care not to lean towards vulgarity even though it falls into an adult comedy film.

=== Box office ===
Boyz 2 was released across Maharashtra on 375 screens and grossed ₹16 crore at the box office.

== See also ==
- Boyz
- Boyz 3
- Boyz 4
