= Masala (2012 film) =

2012 Marathi-language Indian film

- Film poster
- Directed by: Sandesh Kulkarni
- Produced by: Girish Kulkarni; Umesh vinayak Kulkarni
- Starring: Girish Kulkarni; Amruta Subhash; Mohan Agashe; Dilip Prabhavalkar; Hrishikesh Joshi; Shashank Shende; Pravin Tarde; Neha Shitole
- Music by: Anand Modak
- Release date: April 2012
- Country: India
- Language: Marathi

Masala (Marathi: मसाला) is a 2012 Marathi film directed by Sandesh Kulkarni and written by Girish Kulkarni. It is Kulkarni's directorial debut. The film is loosely based on the life story of Hukmichand Chordia of Pravin Masalewale fame.

== Synopsis ==
A couple is forced to repeatedly move in search of sustainable business ventures. They live in constant fear of meeting their creditors, whose money they spent in unfruitful investments. When the couple meets another couple, things start changing for the better by following the wise counsel of their new acquaintances. The latter part of the movie showcases these changes.

== Reception ==
The movie was well received by the audience and appreciated by critics.

The Hollywood Reporter wrote "In his transition to film language, theater director Sandesh Kulkarni makes the most of the sparkling dialogue which lets the actors bring surprising depth to their performances".

== Cast ==
- Girish Kulkarni as Reven Patel.
- Amruta Subhash as Sarika (Reven Patel's wife).
- Mohan Agashe as Sethji, a wealthy businessman.
- Dilip Prabhavalkar
- Hrishikesh Joshi
- Shashank Shende as Half Murder.
- Pravin Tarde as Restaurant Owner.
- Neha Shitole
- Alok Rajwade
- Om Bhutkar
- Sneha Majgaonkar as Sumati.
- Dr. Shreeram Lagoo as perfume seller.
- Jyoti Subhash as Sethji's wife.
- Suhas Shirsat as Police constable.
- Shrikant Yadav
- Mangesh Desai
- Gargi Phule
