= Onkar Bhojane =

Indian actor and comedian

Omkar Bhojane
- Born: 5 March 1992 (age 34); Chiplun, Maharashtra, India
- Occupations: Actor; comedian
- Years active: 2018–present

Onkar Bhojane is an Indian actor, comedian who predominantly works in Marathi theatre, television and films. Bhojane known for his comedy characters played in Maharashtrachi Hasyajatra. His notable films includes Boyz 2 (2018), Boyz 3 (2022), Ghe Double (2022), and Girlz (2019), Sarla Ek Koti.

== Early life and education ==
Onkar Bhojane was born and brought up in Chiplun. He has studied from DBJ college, Chiplun.

== Filmography ==
=== Film ===
Key
†	Denotes films that have not yet been released

Year	Film	Role	Notes	Ref(s)
2018	Boyz 2	Naru Madan Bondwe	Film debut	
2019	Girlz	Rajdeep		
2022	Boyz 3	Naru Madan Bondwe		
2022	Ghe Double			
2023	Sarla Ek Koti	Bhikaji Vakhre	Nominated - Fakt Marathi Cine Sanman for Best Actor in a Lead Role	
2023	Sshort And Ssweet			
2023	Ekda Yeun Tar Bagha	Kartik		
2024	Juna Furniture	Bandya		
2024	Lek Asavi Tar Ashi	Popat		
2026	Salbardi	Mukinda Thorat		
2026	Manjar	Mantya		
2026	Afratafri	Dnyana		

=== Television / Web series ===
Year	Title	Role	Ref(s)
2019–2022	Maharashtrachi Hasyajatra	Contestant	
2022	Fu Bai Fu	Contestant	
2022	Fakt Marathi Cine Sanman	Host	
2023	Fakt Marathi Cine Sanman	Host	
2023	Big Boss Marathi season 4	Guest	
2024	Hastay Na Hasaylach Pahije		
2026	Devkhel		

=== Stage work ===
Year	Title	Language	co-actor	Ref(s)
2023	Karun Gelo Gaon	Malvani	Bhau Kadam	
