= Dagdi Chawl =

Human settlement in Byculla, Mumbai, Maharashtra, India

- Neighbourhood
- Location within Mumbai
- Coordinates: 18.9771°N 72.8291°E
- Country: India
- State: Maharashtra
- District: Mumbai Suburban
- City: Mumbai

Government
  - Type: Municipal corporation
  - Body: Brihanmumbai Municipal Corporation (MCGM)

Languages
  - Official: Marathi
- Time zone: UTC+5:30 (IST)
- Vehicle registration: MH 02

Dagdi Chawl is a neighbourhood in Byculla, Mumbai, used to house mill workers from the nearby industries. Now it is known for the fortified home of mafia don turned politician Arun Gawli.

== In popular culture ==
- On 2 October 2015, a Marathi film starring Ankush Choudhary, Makarand Deshpande and Pooja Sawant has been released by the name Dagdi Chawl which showcases 1995-96 gang war.
- In 2017, a Hindi film Daddy starring Arjun Rampal, is based on the life of Arun Gawli and this film is also set in Dagdi Chawl.
