= Chittaranjan Giri =

Indian actor

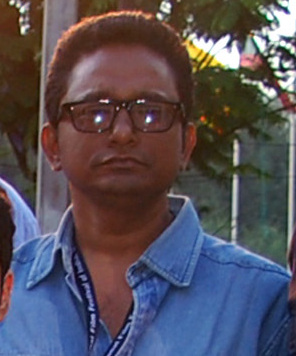
- Chittranjan Giri, 2011
- Born: 10 June 1969 (age 57); Varanasi
- Other name: Chittu
- Occupation: actor
- Years active: 1994–present
- Known for: The Man Beyond the Bridge

Chittaranjan Giri (born 10 June 1965) is an Indian actor, who is known for The Man Beyond the Bridge which won in the competition category at Toronto International Film Festival.

== Early life and education ==
Chittranjan Giri was born on 10 June 1969 in Varanasi, Uttar Pradesh. After completing elementary education and education, he went to the National School of Drama in 1993 to receive bachelor's degree and mastery of Dramatology.

== Upcoming projects ==
- Naham Avkash (Title role)

== Career ==
=== Plays directed ===
- Pratibimb – written by Mahesh Elkunchwar
- Parinati – written by Robin Mohom
- Gunda – written by Jay Shankar Prasad
- Sapne Chuttan Dube Ke – written by Gyan Chaturvedi
- Gur Gobar Ganj – N.S.D. Acting Workshop Benares – written by Ashok Mishra
- The Great Raja Master Drama Co. – written by Dinesh Bharti
- Wang Chu – written by Bhisma Sahani
- Dilli Ki Deewar – written by Uday Prakash, adapted by Vibhanshu Vaibhav, for MCCC Mumbai

=== Lead role in plays ===
- Merchant of Venice – as Shylock
- Kanu Priya – as Krishna
- Einstein – as Einstein
- Romeo Juliet aur Andhra – as Romeo

=== Experience ===
Presently teaching acting and theatre to only selected students and working as an Actor in Film & Theatre in Mumbai

=== Achievements ===
- Received accolades and critical appreciation in the first role as a main lead – film MAN BEYOND THE BRIDGE (Paltadacho Munis)
- Taiwan Film Festival – Maharashtra Times Best Actor nominated for Lathe Joshi
- National Short Film Festival, Malvan – Best Actor (Male) for Black Label
- Jammu Film Festival – Best Actor (Male) in Short Fiction for Black Label
- LIFFT India Filmotsav – Best Actor (Male) in Short Fiction for Black Label

== Filmography ==
- Farzi (2023)
- BABA (2019)
- Super 30 (2019)
- Bhonsle (2019)
- Black Label Lead Role (2019)
- DIFFICULT PEOPLE Lead Role (2019)
- Thackeray (2019)
- Lathe Joshi Lead Role-Winner of PIFF, Best Film (2016)
- PHANTOM (2015)
- Gulaal (2009)
- The Man Beyond the Bridge (2009) Paltadacho Munis (Winner at the TIFF – The Prize of the International Federation of Film Critics (FIPRESCI Prize))
- 1971 (2007)
- Makadee (2002)
- Matrubhoomi (2003)
- Lajja (2001)
- Kasoor (2001)
- Dr. Ambedkar (2000)
- Aakhir Palaayan Kab Tak (2024)
- Salbardi (2026)
