= Parth Bhalerao =

Indian actor

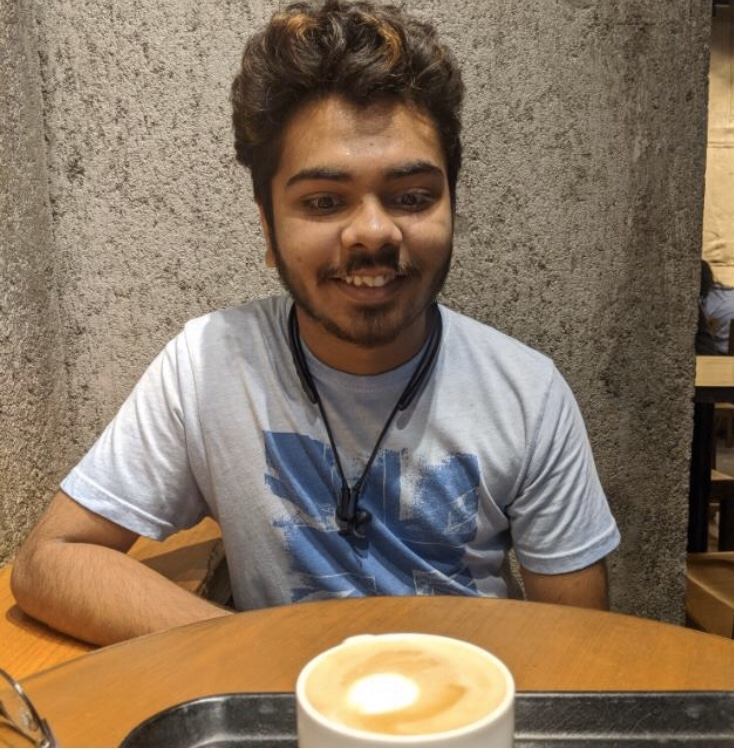
- Born: Pune, Maharashtra, India
- Education: Sir Parashurambhau College
- Occupation: Actor
- Years active: 2012–present

Parth Bhalerao is an Indian actor. He started his acting career with the Marathi film Upside Down (Khalti Doka Varti Paay) but his first released film in Hindi is the 2014 Bollywood film Bhoothnath Returns, co-starring Amitabh Bachchan, for which he received critical acclaim.

At the 62nd National Film Awards, he received Special Mention for his roles in Killa and Bhoothnath Returns, for lovable portrayals with rare aplomb of an impish and caring child in both Killa and Bhootnath Returns. Killa won the Best Feature Film in Marathi Award. At the 57th Maharashtra State Film Awards He Won Maharashtra State Film Award for Best Comedian for his film Basta.

He lives in Pune, where he studies at S. P College. He joined theater in New English school Ramanbaug under the guidance of his teacher Mr. Satpute. He also acts in Satpute's theatre group play, Kollage Creations.

== Filmography ==
Year	Film	Role	Language	Notes	Ref.
2012	Upside Down (Khalti Doka Varti Paay)	Unknown	Marathi	Debut	
2012	Tukaram		Marathi		
2014	Bhoothnath Returns	Akhrot	Hindi	Debut in Bollywood	
2015	Killa	Bandya	Marathi	Won Special Mention (Feature Film) at 62nd National Film Awards	
2016	Lalbaugchi Rani	Govinda	Marathi		
2016	Vees Mhanje Vees		Marathi		
2016	Disco Sanya	Disco Sanya	Marathi		
2017	Boyz	Dhungya	Marathi		
2018	Boyz 2	Dhungya	Marathi		
2018	Firkee	Govind	Marathi		
2019	Girlz	Sada	Marathi		
2020	Doctor Doctor		Marathi	Releasing 30 October on Zee Plex	
2021	Basta	Nandya	Marathi	Maharashtra State Film Award for Best Comedian	
2022	Boyz 3	Dhungya	Marathi		
2022	Ekdam Kadak		Marathi		
2023	Bamboo	Madan	Marathi		
2023	Boyz 4	Dhungya	Marathi		
2023	Piluu Bachelor		Marathi		
2024	Aaichya Gavat Marathi Bol		Marathi		
2025	Ambat Shaukin	Digya	Marathi		

== Television ==
He was in Comedy Nights with kapil as a guest along with Amitabh Bachchan and Boman Irani for one episode.
