= Mulshi Pattern =

2018 Indian film by Pravin Tarde

- Theatrical release poster
- Directed by: Pravin Tarde
- Written by: Pravin Tarde; Kiran Dagade Patil
- Produced by: Abhijeet Bhosale; Punit Balan
- Starring: Om Bhutkar; Pravin Tarde; Mohan Joshi; Upendra Limaye
- Cinematography: Mahesh Limaye
- Edited by: Rameez Dalal; Mayur Hardas; Akshay Salve
- Music by: Narendra Bhide
- Production companies: Abhijeet Bhosale Genuine Production; Punit Balan Entertainment
- Distributed by: Abhijeet Bhosale Genuine Productions; Kiran Dagade Patil Productions
- Release date: 23 November 2018
- Running time: 147 minutes
- Country: India
- Language: Marathi
- Box office: ₹11 crore

Mulshi Pattern is a 2018 Indian Marathi crime film directed by Pravin Tarde and produced by Abhijeet Bhosale, Genuine Production and Punit Balan Entertainment. The film stars Om Bhutkar, Pravin Tarde, Mohan Joshi, and Upendra Limaye. The film is based on events that happened in Mulshi and portrays the hardships faced by farmers and their links to the criminal world. The film was released on 23 November 2018. A Hindi remake of the film released on 26 November 2021, titled Antim: The Final Truth.

== Plot ==
The film opens with the gangster Rahul Patil a.k.a. Rahulya cremating his childhood friend and partner in crime Ganesh a.k.a. Ganya, after his murder at the hands of their rival gang. The rival gang, led by Daya and Pitya, then chase Rahulya through the streets of Pune. Through a series of flashbacks, the film shows how Rahulya ended up becoming a gangster.

Sakharam Patil (Rahul's father), a farmer, in Mulshi tehsil is forced to sell his land. Rahul feels that his family have lost their dignity because of this. Sakharam then works as a watchman at a builder's bungalow but gets fired and insulted after accidentally damaging his car. Along with Rahul's friend Ganya, the family moves to Pune to work as laborers. Rahul refuses to work because he blames his father for the family's troubles. Later, Rahul falls in love with Dipali, the daughter of the head laborer. One morning Rahul angrily beats up and kills a contractor by stabbing him in the collarbone (the contractor abused his father), attracting the attention of local gangster Nanya Bhai in jail who invites Rahul to work for him. Rahul and Ganya both start to work for Bhai. Rahul then learns that it was Nanya Bhai who forced Rahul's father to lose his land. In revenge, Rahul kills him and takes control of the gang. The murder of Nanya Bhai starts a war among the gang members.

Rahul tries to take control over all the lands and businesses built on the lands of Mulshi by corporates, making other gangs angry. Newly employed Inspector Vitthal Kadu (Upendra Limaye) decides to let the gangs kill each other in order to reduce crime. Rahul befriends a small boy and gives him a gun to use in emergencies. Rahul then tries to marry Dipali, but she refuses because he is a gangster. When reunited with his family, he learns that other family members have been earning an honest living doing domestic chores while he enjoyed the profits of crime. When Rahul tells Sakharam to laugh once more, his father responds that Rahul's job has taken his joy away. Eventually, the rival gangs unite to defeat Rahul. Rahul's gang grows weak, and many of his gang members get killed, including Ganya.

The film shifts to the present day where he must attempt to escape from rival gangs. When he seeks help from the boy he befriended, the boy abruptly shoots him upon arriving. As Rahul dies, he learns that the boy's family lost their land to Rahul's gang and that the boy had planned his murder all along. Inspector Kadu, who is shocked by Rahulya's death, is asked by his subordinate where he belongs from, to which Kadu replies that he is from Jatede and he is not from the area of gangsters. Upon hearing the news of Rahul's death, his father finally laughs out, finally getting the joy of knowing that his son is now no longer a gangster and slaps himself. The film ends with an epilogue by Kadu, stating that the "farmers who sell their ancestral land for peanuts, deserves a slap in their face".

== Cast ==
- Om Bhutkar as Rahul "Rahulya" Patil
- Kshitish Date as Ganya
- Mohan Joshi as Sakharam Patil, Rahul's father
- Upendra Limaye as Inspector Vitthal Kadu
- Savita Malpekar as Dhurpi Patil, Rahul's mother
- Dipti Dhotre as Mangal Patil, Rahul's sister
- Pravin Tarde as Nanya Bhai
- Mahesh Manjrekar as Shirpya, Dipali's father
- Malvika Gaekwad as Dipali
- Sunil Abhyankar as the Lawyer
- Suresh Vishwakarma as Uday
- Devendra Gaikwad as Daya
- Ramesh Pardeshi as Pitya Bhai
- Ajay Purkar as Builder Shinde
- Vishwanath Kulkarni as Vaibhav

== Release ==
=== Theatrical ===
Mulshi Pattern was theatrically released on 23 November 2018.

=== Home media ===
The film is available for streaming with English subtitles on ZEE5.

== Remakes ==
In 2020, Tarde revealed the film was being remade in Tamil, Telugu and Kannada languages, and that he was working with actor Dev Gill. The film was remade in Hindi as Antim: The Final Truth and released in 2021.

== Sequel ==
After the success of Mulshi Pattern, the second part of the film is announced by Tarde at the Maharashtra King and Queen contest 2023.
