= Boyz 3 =

- Theatrical release poster
- Directed by: Vishal Devrukhkar
- Written by: Hrishikesh Koli
- Produced by: Lalasaheb Shinde; Rajendra Shinde; Sanjay Chhabriya
- Starring: Parth Bhalerao; Pratik Lad; Sumant Shinde; Vidhula Chaughule
- Cinematography: Yogesh M. Koli
- Edited by: Guru Patil
- Music by: Avdhoot Gupte
- Production companies: A Supreme Motion Pictures; Everest Entertainment
- Release date: 16 September 2022
- Country: India
- Language: Marathi

Boyz 3 is a 2022 Indian Marathi-language comedy drama film written by Hrishikesh Koli and directed by Vishal Devrukhkar. It is sequel to Boyz 2, starring Parth Bhalerao, Pratik Lad, Sumant Shinde and Vidhula Chaughule. The film was released on 16 September 2022.

== Cast ==
- Parth Bhalerao as Dhungraj "Dhungya"
- Pratik Lad as Dhairyasheel "Dhairya"
- Sumant Shinde as Kabir Gayatri Panigrahi
- Vidula Chougule as Keerti Saranjame
- Onkar Bhojane as Narun Madan Bhondwe
- Girish Kulkarni as Madan Bhondwe
- Poonam Bhagwat as Gulabadaniwali Mulagi
- Samir Chaughule as Sundar Gowda
- Sameer Dharmadhikari as Kabir's Father
- Manali Deshmukh as Catering Girl
- Vinayak Gavande as Bodybuilder
- Karan Gupta as Dumya's Friend
- Dilip Halyal as Police Inspector
- Vidyadhar Joshi aa Appa
- Madhavi Juvekar as Amma
- Digambar Kelekar as Tenya

== Release ==
Boyz 3 was theatrically released on 16 September 2022 in all over India including Maharashtra.

== Controversy ==
The Karnataka Rakshana Vedike Association opposed to the release of Boyz 3 in Belgaum, objecting to dialogues against the Karnataka Police.

== Reception ==
=== Critical reception ===
Kalpeshraj Kubal of Maharashtra Times gave 3 out of five and write "The film's leading actors Sameer Choughule, Girish Kulkarni and Onkar Bhojane have brought their own style to the film and Vidhula too has done well with the boldness required in her debut." Appreciating the music and cinematography, she said the scenic beauty of Karnataka has been captured by the director and cinematographer in a fitting manner to the screenplay.

=== Box office ===
Boyz 3 has earned ₹4.96 crores in the first week. In the end, the film stopped running with a collection of ₹7.66 crores.

== Soundtrack ==
Boyz 3

Soundtrack album by Avdhoot Gupte
- Released: 23 September 2022
- Genre: Feature film soundtrack
- Length: 12:06
- Language: Marathi
- Label: Everest Entertainment

Official audio
- Boyz 3 - Full Album on YouTube

Music and lyrics is given by Avdhoot Gupte and Background score is by Aditya Bedekar.

Track listing
No.	Title	Lyrics	Singer (s)	Length
1.	"Manat Shirli"	Sameer Samant	Sonu Nigam	3:28
2.	"Mast Maula"	Sameer Samant	Ravindra Khomne, Munnavar Ali	2:46
3.	"Chand Mathyavari"	Jitendra Joshi	Avdhoot Gupte	3:46
4.	"Yara"	Sameer Samant	Vishwajeet Borwankar, Padmanabh Gaikwad	3:04
Total length:				12:06
