= Shilpa Tulaskar =

Indian television actress

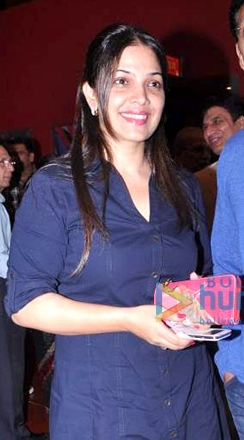
- Tulaskar in 2013
- Born: Shilpa Tulaskar; 10 March 1977 (age 49); Mumbai, Maharashtra, India
- Education: Ramnarain Ruia College
- Occupation: Actress
- Years active: 1993 − present
- Spouse: Vishal Shetty (m. 2003)
- Children: 2

Shilpa Tulaskar (10 March 1977) is an Indian actress who has acted in Marathi films and Hindi television shows.

She recently portrayed the role of Rajnandini in Zee Marathi's drama Tula Pahate Re and also the character of Sujata, mother of the male lead Atharva, in Jana Na Dil Se Door on Star Plus.

== Career ==
Her first television role was in the episode Kiley ka Rahasya of Byomkesh Bakshi (1993) as Tulsi (credited as Shilpa Toraskar), broadcasteby Doordarshan, followed by Shanti, where she played the role of Ranjana in 1994. She then appeared in the Marathi TV show Vaibhav. Tulaskar acted in films Devaki (2001), Dombivali Fast (2005), Kalchakra (2008) and television serial Ladies Special (Sony TV).

Tulaskar also has a number of plays to her credit. She also played role in Dill Mill Gayye. She portrayed Shivaji's mother Jijabai in Veer Shivaji on Colors, and Queen Menavati (Goddess Parvati's mother) in Devon Ke Dev...Mahadev.

She is originally from Vengurla, Sindhudurg Marriage up in Mumbai, Maharashtra Shilpa Tulaskar our family members Konkan.

== Television ==
- 9 Malabar Hill
- Veer Shivaji as Jijabai
- Rishtey Episode 14
- Pal Chhin as Charulata on (Star Plus)
- Kavach (unknown)
- Bandhan on (DD Metro)
- 2001 Dil Chahata Hai on Sony SAB as Shivani Karan Mathur
- Byomkesh Bakshi (TV series) (Episode: Kiley ka Rahasya) as Tulsi (credited as Shilpa Toraskar) (Doordarshan)
- Hero - Bhakti Hi Shakti Hai... as Sunaina Sehgal (Joy's Mother) (Season 1 &3)
- Shanti... as Shyama
- Teacher (Zee TV)
- Hudd Kar Di... as Namrata Singh Dhanwa
- Dill Mill Gayye... as Padma Bansal Gupta
- Jersey No. 10... as Leela Salgaonkar
- Kaisa Ye Pyar Hai... as Avantika Agarwal
- Ladies Special... as Nanda Shinde
- Bhaskar Bharti... as Nanda Shinde
- Chand Chupa Badal Mein (cameo)... as herself
- Devon Ke Dev - Mahadev (Hindi) as Queen Mena
- Eka Lagnachi Tisri Goshta (Marathi) as Gauri Panse-Chaudhari
- Hero Hungama TV as Sunaina Sehgal
- Kyun Hota Hai Pyarrr as Aarti Sharma
- Jaana Na Dil Se Door as Sujata, Atharva's mother
- Ek Deewaana Tha as Sadhvi
- Tula Pahate Re as Rajnandini Dadasaheb Saranjame / Rajnandini Gajendra Patil
- Rang Majha Vegla as Herself (cameo appearance)
- Dadi Amma... Dadi Amma Maan Jaao! as Rekha, an industrialist
- Mere Sai - Shraddha Aur Saburi as Saras (cameo)
- Tu Tevha Tashi as Anamika Dixit / Anamika Akash Joshi (lead role)
- Jhanak as Urvashi
- Manpasand Ki Shaadi as Sarojini Dewan

== Filmography ==
=== Films ===
- Thodi Thodi Si Manmaaniyan (Hindi film); as Saroj Deep Kaul
- Devaki
- Dombivli Fast (Marathi film) as Alka Apte
- Anandache Zhaad
- Kalchakra
- Sanai Choughade (Marathi film) as Urmila
- Mujhse Fraaandship Karoge (Hindi)
- Krazy 4
- Bhatukali
- Boyz as Gayatri Panigrahi (Kabir's Mother)
- Boyz 2 as Gayatri Panigrahi (Kabir's Mother)
- Sugar, Salt ani Prem
- Ente Ummante Peru (Malayalam film)
- Fera Feri Hera Feri (Gujarati film)
- Sohala
- Hi Nanna (Telugu film) as Yashna's mother
- Ishq Vishk Rebound (Hindi film) as Raghav's mother
- Transfer Trimurthulu (Telugu film) as C.M. Kamala Devi

=== Theatre ===
- Javai Maza Bhala (Marathi)
- To Karo Shree Ganesh (Gujarati)
- Savita Damodar Paranjpe (Hindi Zee Theatre)
- Just Another Rape (English)
- Lahanpan Dega Deva (Marathi)
