= Nude (2018 film) =

- Directed by: Ravi Jadhav
- Screenplay by: Sachin Kundalkar; Ravi Jadhav
- Story by: Ravi Jadhav
- Produced by: Ravi Jadhav; Nikhil Sane; Nitin Keni
- Starring: Chhaya Kadam; Madan Deodhar; Kalyanne Mulay
- Cinematography: Amalendu Chaudhary
- Production companies: Zee Studios; Ravi Jadhav Films
- Release date: 27 April 2018
- Country: India
- Language: Marathi

Nude is a 2018 Indian Marathi language film directed by Ravi Jadhav and produced by Ravi Jadhav and Zee Studio. The movie was released on 27 April 2018. The film tells the story of a model who poses nude to earn money for her son's education.

== Plot ==
Yamuna belongs to a very poor family. She lives with her teenage son Lakshman and husband who has an open illicit relationship and spends her earnings and jewellery on the other woman. After being publicly humiliated by her husband, Yamuna leaves her village and arrives in Mumbai to stay with her aunt, Akke who is equally poor and lives with her husband in a single room. Her aunt supports her and they start leading a normal life. Yamuna spends most of the day looking for a job because she doesn't want to be a burden on her aunt. Frustrated one day she tries to find what job Akkey does. She follows her to Sir J. J. School of Art and finds out that she is a nude model for the students of the arts college.

After a minor tiff on the nature of the job, Akke reveals to Yamuna that she has been doing this for past 15 to 20 years and it is a noble work of education. After some thought, she asks Yamuna if she would like to do the job. After initial hesitation, Yamuna agrees and they go to the college. Yamuna starts with her job as a nude model and earns a decent amount of money. She also does housekeeping jobs to earn extra income. There is only one student who seems to care about her while the rest of them are oblivious to her presence.

She is happy with her job because it funds the education of her son. One fine day she finds paintings in his school bag and figures out his inclination towards arts. However Akke and Yamuna fear that one day Lakshman might join the same college and their secret would be exposed. So it is decided that they would send him to a relative in Aurangabad for higher education. Lakshman vehemently protests this because he understands that Mumbai offers better education opportunities than Aurangabad. He is forced to leave Mumbai and is very bitter about this.

Life continues, and Lakshman constantly demands money for his education. Yamuna takes up private assignments reluctantly to fulfill is demands. However, one student from the college always accompanies her because she is not comfortable posing nude outside the secure premises of the college. One day, renowned artist M. F. Husain arrives in Mumbai and she is requested to pose nude for him. After a few days there is violent protest regarding this nude painting and protesters attack the college and destroy the nude paintings. All are scared but it is Yamuna who is the first one to resume work.

Later, Akke suffers joint pains and is unable to continue with her work. One day when Lakshman arrives home, he accuses Yamuna of prostitution. He also tells her that he would not be continuing his education anymore because he is fed up of this life of poverty & wants to go to the Middle East. Yamuna is deeply shattered and feels that one day she would suffer the same fate of Akke and die in pain, agony and poverty. With no more motivation to live, she commits suicide. Lakshman soon learns of an exhibition of nude paintings in the same college. Out of lust, he decides to visit the exhibition. When he sees a nude painting of his mother he attacks the artist.

== Cast ==
- Chhaya Kadam as Chandrakka
- Madan Deodhar as Laxman 'Laanya'
- Kalyanee Mulay as Yamuna
- Naseeruddin Shah as M. F. Husain
- Kishor Kadam as Dean of Sir J. J. School of Art
- Om Bhutkar as Jairam
