= Pitruroon =

- Directed by: Nitish Bharadwaj
- Written by: Nitish Bharadwaj; Pravin Tarde
- Starring: Sachin Khedekar; Tanuja; Suhas Joshi
- Cinematography: Mahesh Aney
- Music by: Kaushal Inamdar
- Release date: 2013
- Running time: 153 minutes
- Country: India
- Language: Marathi

Pitruroon is a 2013 Indian Marathi Language film directed by Nitish Bharadwaj. The film is a directional debut of Nitish Bharadwaj and it based on Runa, a Kannada story by Sudha Murty.

== Plot ==
An archeologist investigates history of his own family when coming across a lookalike during visit to a village.

== Cast ==
- Suhas Joshi
- Sachin Khedekar
- Tanuja
- Poorvi Bhave
