= Mogra Phulaalaa =

2019 Indian Marathi-language drama film

- Theatrical release poster
- Directed by: Shrabani Deodhar
- Screenplay by: Sachin Mote
- Produced by: Arjun Singgh Baran; Kartk D Nishandar
- Starring: Sai Deodhar; Swwapnil Joshi; Neena Kulkarni; Chandrakant Kulkarni
- Cinematography: Amol Gole
- Edited by: Jafar Sultan
- Music by: Kaushik Deshpande
- Production company: GSEAMS
- Distributed by: Panorama Studios
- Release date: 14 June 2019
- Running time: 139 minutes
- Country: India
- Language: Marathi
- Box office: 3.80 crore

Mogra Phulaalaa (transl. Mogra bloomed) is an Indian Marathi language family-drama film, directed by Shrabani Deodhar, and produced by Arjun Singgh Baran and Kartik Nishandar. The film starring Swwapnil Joshi, Sai Deodhar, Neena Kulkarni and Chandrakant Kulkarni follows a story of possessive mother and her devoted son, and how the things change when he meets woman of his dreams. The film was released on 14 June 2019.

== Cast ==
- Swwapnil Joshi as Sunil Kulkarni
- Sai Deodhar
- Neena Kulkarni as mother of Sunil
- Chandrakant Kulkarni
- Sandeep Pathak
- Samidha Guru as Sister-in-law
- Sonamm Nishandarm
- Anand Inghale
- Vighnesh Joshi
- Sanyogitha Bhave
- Dipti Bhagwat
- Saanvi Ratnalikar
- Prasad Limaye as younger brother
- Ashish Ghokale
- Aditya Deshmukh as Pankaj
- Amod Jande as Pagare Banker
- Prachi Joshi
- Harsha Gupte
- Anuradha Rajadhyaksha
- Umesh Dhamle
- Madhuri Bharti
- Siddhirupa Karmarkar
- Suhita Thatte

== Release ==
The official trailer of the film was launched on 3 June 2019 by Zee Music Company.

The film was released on 14 June 2019.

=== Critical response ===
The Times of India gave the film three stars out of five, and praised the performances of Swwapnil Joshi, Sai Deodhar, Neena Kulkarni and felt that, the way the characters of the film gave life to the narrative was appreciable. Concluding, they wrote "Mogra Phulaalaa makes for a decent watch because it sensibly portrays the family equations in families today. Watch it for the same. Chitrali Chogle of the Times Now gave the film two and half stars out of five, and concurred with TOI in praising the performances of entire cast. Summing up Chogle noted, "Mogra Phulaalaa is a good film with all the masala, drama and story, but has some missing points and some loopholes. Nevertheless, the film is entertaining enough to be seen and enjoyed with family."

== Soundtrack ==
Mogra Phulaalaa

Soundtrack album by Rohit Shyam Raut
- Released: 6 May 2019
- Recorded: 2019
- Studio: Amplitude Recording Studio
- Genre: Feature film soundtrack
- Length: 15:43
- Language: Marathi
- Label: Zee Music Company
External audio
- Audio Jukebox on YouTube

The soundtrack is composed by Rohit Shyam Raut and lyrics are by Abhishek Khankar.

Track listing
No.	Title	Singer(s)	Length
1.	"Mogra Phulaalaa"	Shankar Mahadevan	3:41
2.	"Maarva (Male Version)"	Jasraj Joshi	3:48
3.	"Maarva (Female Version)"	Bela Shende	4:44
4.	"Manmohini"	Rohit Shyam Raut	3:30
Total length:			15:43
