= Boyz (film) =

- Directed by: Vishal Devrukhkar
- Written by: Rahul Odak; Vishal Devrukhkar
- Screenplay by: Hrishikesh Koli
- Produced by: Lalasaheb Shinde; Rajendra Shinde; Avadhoot Gupte (Presenter)
- Starring: Sumant Shinde; Parth Bhalerao; Pratik Lad; Ritika Shrotri; Santosh Juvekar; Shilpa Tulaskar; Sharvari Jamenis; Zakir Hussain; Bhalchandra Kadam; Vaibhav Mangle; Ashvini Mahangade
- Cinematography: Siddartha Jatla
- Edited by: Guru Patil; Mahesh Killekar
- Music by: Avadhoot Gupte; Vaibhav Joshi
- Production company: Supreme Motion Pictures Pvt Ltd
- Distributed by: Pickle Entertainment
- Release date: 8 September 2017
- Running time: 135 minutes
- Country: India
- Language: Marathi
- Box office: est. ₹8.40 crore (US$870,000)(1st week)

Boyz is a 2017 Marathi coming of age comedy film directed by Vishal Devrukhkar, produced by Lalasaheb Shinde and Rajendra Shinde and presented by the singer Avadhoot Gupte. The film stars Sumant Shinde, Parth Bhalerao, Pratik Lad and Ritika Shrotri in lead roles, and marks the acting debut for Sumant Shinde and Pratik Lad. A sequel named Boyz 2 was released on 5 October 2018.

== Plot ==
This is a tale of Kabir "Gayatri" Panigrahi, raised by his mother alone. He's tired of facing questions about his father. All the time his mother steers away from the discussion whenever they come to the topic of Kabir's father, which has now developed deep cracks between the two. The only communication thread between them is Kabir's aunt, Radhika. Citing the tense atmosphere at home his mother and aunt decide to send Kabir to a Boarding school.

Two years on, Kabir has settled at the School and has earned every possible success that is achievable. He's striving for success all the time although the questions about the identity of his father still keep haunting him.

Dhairya and Dhungya, two village children get inducted in school as a special case. Both Dhairya and Dhungya are full of mischiefs. Tired of their deeds the villagers have arranged their admission to the boarding school to keep them away. The new entrants start to show their colors and the institute which is based on its principles start to witness changes.

Kabir is irritated with the fact that Dhungya and Dhairya are his new roommates. However, as time passes by, the classmates of the duo start liking their carefree attitude towards Life. Kabir has fallen in love with his classmate Grace. Dhungya and Dhairya help Kabir to confess his love for her. In that process, the trio reveal their respective secrets. Dhungya's father was a farmer who committed suicide due to his inability to repay a loan. Dhairya's parents work in a brick kiln and want him to succeed in life. However Kabir still doesn't know who is his father.

Meanwhile, Gayatri's medical report states that she is in her last stage of breast cancer. Finally, Radhika in a final attempt to mend the relationship between her sister and nephew, calls up the school common phone, which is attended by Dhungya and Dhairya. She tells them about Gayatri's condition and the duo decides to reunite Kabir and his mom.

On the other hand, the principal of the school expels Rohan, a fellow student over his poor performance. Rohan reveals to his friends that his parents are about to get divorced. Hence, that has affected his performance. Kabir helps Rohan to escape from the school. Unfortunately, the latter's father brings him back to the school and the principal flogs him in front of everyone. Dhairya, in a bid to save his friend, steps in and takes the rest of the beatings. Finally tormented by the authority of the principal, the students fill up his complaint box with letters saying "I HATE YOU". Subsequently Dhairya and Dhungya's secret of being sent to this school by forging marksheets is revealed. But their classmates support them to stay. The duo video call Kabir from the latter's house to show him that how much his mom missed him in the last 2 years. Tearfully, Kabir reconciles with his mom.

The film ends with the trio reuniting at the hostel wondering what next. And Kabir tells them to stop worrying.

== Cast ==
- Sumant Shinde as Kabir Gayatri Panigrahi
- Parth Bhalerao as Dhungraj aka "Dhungya"
- Pratik Lad as Dhairyasheel aka "Dhairya"
- Ritika Shrotri as Grace
- Santosh Juvekar as Mandar sir
- Shilpa Tulaskar as Gayatri Panigrahi (Kabir's Mother)
- Sharvari Jamenis as Radhika (Kabir's Aunt)
- Zakir Hussain as Fernandez Sir
- Bhalchandra Kadam as Baban
- Vaibhav Mangle as Namya
- Ashvini Mahangade as Teacher
- Sunny Leone as Item number "Kutha kutha jayacha honeymoon la"

== Box office ==
Boyz was released on 8 September 2017, with the first weekend collection over ₹3.72 crore (US$390,000) at the box office. The film collected ₹8.40 crore (US$870,000) in its first week and became a surprise blockbuster at the box office.

== Sequels ==
A sequel of the movie Boyz 2 was released on 5 October 2018. The Third installment of the movie Boyz 3 was released on 16 September 2022.

== Soundtrack ==
Boyz

Soundtrack album by Avdhoot Gupte and Vaibhav Joshi
- Released: 6 August 2017
- Genre: Feature film soundtrack
- Length: 17:21
- Language: Marathi
- Label: Zee Music Company

Official audio
- Boyz - Full Album on YouTube

The music of the film is composed by Avadhoot Gupte with lyrics by Avadhoot Gupte and Vaibhav Joshi.

=== Track listing ===
All music is composed by Avdhoot Gupte.

No.	Title	Lyrics	Singer(s)	Length
1.	"Lagnalu"	Avadhoot Gupte	Kaustubh Gaikwad, Janardan Khandalkar	3:22
2.	"Jeevana"	Vaibhav Joshi	Swapnil Bandodkar	2:51
3.	"Let's Be Friends"	Avadhoot Gupte	Avadhoot Gupte	3:52
4.	"Yaariyaan"	Avadhoot Gupte	Vijay Prakash	3:49
5.	"Lampat Zampat"		Digvijay Joshi	3:29
6.	"Kutha Kutha Jayacha Hanimunla" (not included in album)		Sunidhi Chauhan	3:48
