= Deool =

2011 film by Umesh Vinayak Kulkarni

- Movie poster
- Directed by: Umesh Vinayak Kulkarni
- Written by: Girish Pandurang Kulkarni
- Screenplay by: Girish Pandurang Kulkarni
- Produced by: Abhijeet Gholap
- Starring: Nana Patekar; Dilip Prabhawalkar; Girish Kulkarni; Sonali Kulkarni; Sharvani Pillai
- Cinematography: Sudhakar Reddy Yakkanti
- Edited by: Abhijit Deshpande
- Music by: Mangesh Dhakde
- Production company: Devisha Films
- Release dates: 10 October 2011 (at Pusan International Film Festival, South Korea); 4 November 2011 (in India)
- Country: India
- Language: Marathi
- Budget: ₹5.5 crore

Deool (transl. The Temple) is a 2011 Indian Marathi comedy directed by Umesh Vinayak Kulkarni (an alumnus of the Film and Television Institute of India, (FTII) Pune). The film stars Girish Kulkarni, Nana Patekar, Dilip Prabhawalkar, Sharvani Pillai, and Sonali Kulkarni in lead roles. The film is about the effect of globalization on India's small towns and the terrible state of Indian villages, with a political backdrop.

Deool won the 59th National Film Awards for Best Feature Film, Best Actor (Girish Kulkarni) and Best Dialogue (Girish Kulkarni).

The film also marks the debut of veteran Hindi film actor Naseeruddin Shah in the Marathi film industry.

== Plot ==
In the rural areas of Maharashtra lies a peaceful village called Mangrul. Keshya (Girish Kulkarni), a simple village youth, who works for Bhau (Nana Patekar) as a cow stockman, takes one of Bhau's cows named "KARDI", to one of the hills in the village where there is an Audumber (Ficus racemosa: Indian fig tree) tree present. KARDI scratches her head over that tree and by which Lord Dattatreya makes a presence and shows his Avtar to Keshya. Keshya, by experiencing God's Avtar, makes a hue and cry in the village saying God Dattatreya made an appearance for him.

Anna (Dillip Prabhavalkar), most respected figure of Mangrul, advises him against announcing such personal matter as it's a question of faith. However, it is too late as a journalist Mahasangram (Kishor Kadam) with the help of a few other village youths who are more involved in politics, sensationalise the news about Lord Dattatrey making an appearance in Mangrul. There is now a demand for a Dattatrey temple. Bhau doesn't approve it as he wants the funds to be used for better purposes, as Anna also has vision to build a hospital in the village. But since Bhau, helpless looking at the village so demanding, the temple is built. And slowly the village becomes a holy place. Mangrul goes through a 360 degree change due to commercialization, but nobody is complaining except Anna. Soon, blinded by the commercial progress, God is forgotten. Every village has a right to progress commercially, but how ethical it is to use a temple and is it good to achieve it?

== Cast ==
- Nana Patekar as Bhau Galande
- Dilip Prabhawalkar as Anna Kulkarni
- Sonali Kulkarni as Vahini
- Girish Kulkarni as Keshav Rambhol
- Jyoti Subhash as Kanta, Keshya's Mother
- Jyoti Malshe as Pinky
- Atisha Naik as Sarpanch (Village head)
- Usha Nadkarni as Sarpanch's Mother in Law
- Kishor Kadam as Mahasangram
- Shrikant Yadav as Appa Galande
- Hrishikesh Joshi as Tommya (Jambuwant Rao)
- Neha Shitole as Tommya's wife
- Shashank Shende as Ninety (Teacher)
- Sharvani Pillai as Ninety's wife
- Om Bhutkar as Yuvri
- Mayur Khandge as Emdya
- Suhas Shirsat as Poytya
- Abhijit Khaire as Audience
- Vibhavari Deshpande as Poytya's Sister in Law
- Bhakti Ratnaparakhi as Appa Galande's wife

Guest Appearance

- Mohan Agashe as Aamdar Saheb
- Naseeruddin Shah as Dacoit

== Release ==
Deool was shown in Busan International Film Festival, New York's South Asian International Film Festival, the Abu Dhabi International Film Festival and MAMI in Mumbai. Deool had its theatrical release on 4 November 2011 with 404 shows across Maharashtra. Following its strong reception, the number of screenings was expanded to 464. In its second week, the film was featured in 307 theaters statewide, including 54 screenings in Pune.

== Reception ==
=== Critical reception ===
Blessy Chettiar of DNA India rated 4 stars out of 5 stars, Chettiar praises Deool for its insightful and engaging portrayal of religion, politics, and rural life in Maharashtra. With strong performances, thoughtful writing, and effective use of humor and music, the film stands out as a significant contribution to Marathi cinema, despite its length. Namita Niwas of The Indian Express rated 3 stars out of 5 stars and commends the film for its engaging portrayal of how globalization and materialism impact a rural village, despite its familiar storyline. With strong performances and adept direction by Umesh Kulkarni, the film effectively highlights societal issues while keeping the audience engaged. Darcy Paquet of Screen Daily praises for its skillful handling of a large ensemble cast and its effective portrayal of a village's rapid transformation. The film balances entertainment with deeper themes of economic development, corruption, and religious belief, allowing viewers to explore these issues without overt direction.

=== Box office ===
The film was collected ₹2.5 crore in the first week.

== Music ==
Music of Deool was composed by Mangesh Dhakade and lyrics were penned by Swanand Kirkire, Sudhir Moghe.

Track listing
No.	Title	Singer(s)	Length
1.	"Deva Tula Shodhu Kutha" (Bhajan)	Shahir Devanand Mali	02:53
2.	"Welcome Ho Raya Welcome"	Urmila Dhangar	04:32
3.	"Phoda Datta Naam Taho"	Swanand Kirkire	05:19
4.	"Tu Jhop Tujha Datta Jaga Aahe"	Swanand Kirkire	02:47
