= Ajay-Atul discography =

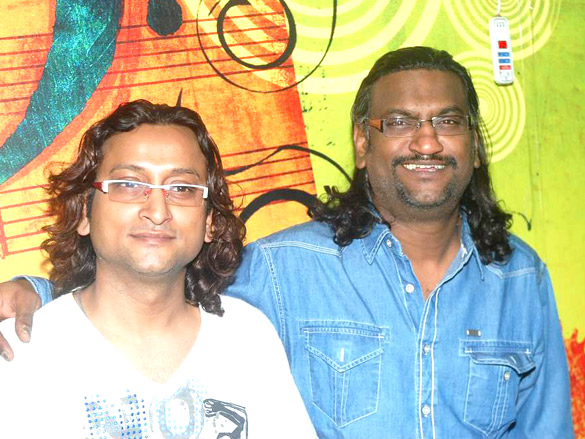
Ajay-Atul in 2012.

Ajay-Atul, are the Indian music composer duo consisting of brothers Ajay Ashok Gogavale and Atul Ashok Gogavale, have made contributions to the music industry. Their work in the Marathi film Jogwa earned them the Best Music Direction award at the 56th National Film Awards in 2008. In 2015, they entered the Forbes India Celebrity 100 List, debuting at the 82nd position, and climbed to 22nd place by 2019. Over the years, they have created music for numerous successful Marathi and Hindi films.

Some of Ajay-Atul's acclaimed works include compositions for the films like Aga Bai Arrecha!, Jatra, Agneepath, Dhadak, Sairat. In 2010, the duo crafted both the songs and the background score for the Marathi film Naṭarang, drawing inspiration from traditional Marathi folk genres such as Lavani, Phaṭakā, and Tamāśā. Their expertise extends to Hindi cinema as well, having composed for films like Singham and Bol Bachchan, both featuring Ajay Devgn and directed by Rohit Shetty, as well as Agneepath and Brothers, produced by Karan Johar and directed by Karan Malhotra. Additionally, they contributed to the soundtrack of the Aamir Khan-led film PK.

In 2016, Ajay-Atul collaborated with director Nagraj Manjule on the film Sairat, which became the only Marathi film to surpass the 1 billion mark in box office collections. They also provided music for Manasu Mallige, the Kannada adaptation of Sairat, and its Hindi remake, Dhadak. Beyond composing, they produced the Marathi film Jaundya Na Balasaheb, directed by Girish Kulkarni. Their portfolio further includes scores for Tumbbad, Thugs of Hindostan, Mauli, and Zero. Notably, the track "Mere Naam Tu".

Recognizing their significant impact, Ajay-Atul were honored with the 'Composer of the Decade' award at the Mirchi Music Awards in 2021 for their work on Agneepath.

== Discography as composer ==
=== Album soundtracks ===
| Year | Album | Language | Contribution |
|---|---|---|---|
| 1999 | College College | Hindi (audio movie) | Composers |
| 2001 | Vishwavinayak | Sanskrit | Composers |
| 2002 | Shri Ram Mantra (Rama) | Sanskrit | Arrangers |
| 2003 | Sang Sang Ho Tum | Hindi | Composers |
| 2003 | Bedhund | Marathi | Composers |
| 2003 | Meera Kahen | Hindi | Composers |
| 2006 | Vishwatma | Sanskrit | Composers |

=== Film soundtracks ===
| † | Denotes films that have not yet been released |

| Year | Film | Director | Language | Notes |
|---|---|---|---|---|
| 2004 | Gayab | Prawaal Raman | Hindi | Songs |
| 2004 | Aga Bai Arrecha! | Kedar Shinde | Marathi | Songs and Background Score |
| 2005 | Goad Gupit | Pramod Prabhulkar | Marathi | Songs and Background Score |
| 2005 | Jatra | Kedar Shinde | Marathi | Songs and Background Score |
| 2005 | Savarkhed Ek Gaon | Rajiv Patil | Marathi | Songs |
| 2005 | Viruddh... Family Comes First | Mahesh Manjrekar | Hindi | 1 Song and Background Score |
| 2005 | Vaah! Life Ho Toh Aisi! | Mahesh Manjrekar | Hindi | 1 Song |
| 2005 | Struggler | Mahesh Manjrekar | Hindi | Songs |
| 2006 | Restaurant | Sachin Kundalkar | Marathi | Background Score |
| 2006 | Shock | Harish Shankar | Telugu | Song |
| 2007 | Zabardast | Mahesh Kothare | Marathi | Songs |
| 2007 | Bandh Premache | Abhiram Bhadkamkar | Marathi | Songs |
| 2007 | Saade Maade Teen | Ankush Choudhary – Sachit Patil | Marathi | Title Song |
| 2008 | Checkmate | Sanjay Jadhav | Marathi | Title Song |
| 2008 | Tujhya Majhya Sansarala Aani Kaay Have | Rajiv Patil | Marathi | Song |
| 2008 | Uladhaal | Aditya Sarpotdar | Marathi | Songs and Background Score |
| 2008 | Mumbai Amchich | Sharad Bansode | Marathi | Background Score |
| 2009 | Ek Daav Dhobi Pachhad | Satish Rajwade | Marathi | Title Song |
| 2009 | Bedhund | Dnyanesh Bhalekar | Marathi | Songs |
| 2009 | Oxygen: Jiv Gudmartoy | Rajiv Patil | Marathi | Songs |
| 2009 | Jogwa | Rajiv Patil | Marathi | Songs |
| 2009 | Natarang | Ravi Jadhav | Marathi | Song and Background Score |
| 2010 | Ringa Ringa | Sanjay Jadhav | Marathi | Songs |
| 2011 | Atta Ga Baya | Sanjay Narvekar | Marathi | 1 Song |
| 2011 | My Friend Pinto | Raaghav Dar | Hindi | Songs |
| 2011 | Singham | Rohit Shetty | Hindi | Songs |
| 2012 | Agneepath | Karan Malhotra | Hindi | Songs and Background Score |
| 2012 | Bol Bachchan | Rohit Shetty | Hindi | 1 Song |
| 2013 | Bharatiya | Girish Mohite | Marathi | Songs |
| 2013 | Dhating Dhingana | Mandar Devsthali | Marathi | 2 Songs |
| 2014 | Fandry | Nagraj Manjule | Marathi | Promotional Song |
| 2014 | Lai Bhaari | Nishikant Kamat | Marathi | Songs |
| 2014 | PK | Rajkumar Hirani | Hindi | 1 Song |
| 2015 | Brothers | Karan Malhotra | Hindi | Songs & Background Score (1 song recreated from Jatra) |
| 2015 | Nilkanth Master | Gajendra Ahire | Marathi | Songs |
| 2016 | Sairat | Nagraj Manjule | Marathi | Song, Lyrics & Background Score |
| 2016 | Jaundya Na Balasaheb | Girish Kulkarni | Marathi | Song & Background Score |
| 2017 | Manasu Mallige | S. Narayan | Kannada | Remake of Sairat. 4 songs reused. |
| 2018 | Mauli | Aditya Sarpotdar | Marathi | Songs |
| 2018 | Dhadak | Shashank Khaitan | Hindi | Songs |
| 2018 | Thugs of Hindostan | Vijay Krishna Acharya | Hindi | Songs |
| 2018 | Tumbbad | Rahi Anil Barve; Adesh Prasad | Hindi | 1 song (Title Track) |
| 2018 | Zero | Aanand L. Rai | Hindi | 4 Songs & Background Score |
| 2019 | Super 30 | Vikas Bahl | Hindi | Songs & Background Score |
| 2019 | Panipat | Ashutosh Gowariker | Hindi | Songs & Background Score |
| 2020 | Tanhaji | Om Raut | Hindi | 1 Song |
| 2022 | Jhund | Nagraj Manjule | Hindi | Songs |
| 2022 | Ram Setu | Abhishek Sharma | Hindi | 1 song |
| 2022 | Chandramukhi | Prasad Oak | Marathi | Songs |
| 2022 | Ved | Riteish Deshmukh | Marathi | Songs |
| 2023 | Jaggu Ani Juliet | Mahesh Limaye | Marathi | Songs |
| 2023 | Maharashtra Shahir | Kedar Shinde | Marathi | Songs & Background |
| 2023 | Adipurush | Om Raut | Hindi; Telugu | 4 songs |
| 2024 | Madgaon Express | Kunal Khemu | Hindi | 1 song |
| 2024 | Yek Number | Rajesh Mapuskar | Marathi | 2 Songs |
| 2026 | Raja Shivaji | Riteish Deshmukh | Marathi; Hindi | Songs |
| 2026 | Ranabaali | Rahul Sankrityan | Telugu | Songs & Background Score |
| 2026 | Eetha † | Laxman Utekar | Hindi | songs & Background Score |
| 2027 | Khashaba † | Nagraj Manjule | Marathi | Songs & Background Score |

=== Television soundtracks ===
| Sr.No. | Serial/Track | Channel | Notes/Awards |
|---|---|---|---|
| 1. | Raja Shivchhatrapati | Star Pravah | Maharashtra Times Sanman |
| 2. | Zee Gaurav Geet | Zee Marathi | Zee Gaurav Award |
| 3. | Eka Peksha Ek | Zee Marathi | |
| 4. | Lakh Lakh Chanderi | Zee Talkies | |
| 5. | Sa Re Ga Ma Pa Marathi | Zee Marathi | |
| 6. | Hapta Band | Zee Marathi | |
| 7. | Hasyasamraat | Zee Marathi | |
| 8. | Cricket Club | Zee Marathi | |
| 9. | Bhavanjali | Mi Marathi | |
| 10. | Kya Baat Hai | Zee Marathi | |
| 11. | Misha | Zee Marathi | |
| 12. | Amchya Sarkhe Amhich | Zee Marathi | |
| 13. | Bola Bola Tring Tring | DD Sahyadri | |
| 14. | Shriyut Gangadhar Tipre | Zee Marathi | Background Score |
| 15. | Vadalvaat | Zee Marathi | Background Score |
| 16. | Bedhund Manachya Lahari | ETV Marathi | Background Score |
| 17. | Mahabharat | Star Plus | Title Song |
| 18. | Sony Entertainment Television | Sony Channel | Sony Theme Track |
| 19. | Sony Marathi theme song | Sony Marathi | Sony Marathi theme song |
| 20. | Kaun Banega Crorepati 11 theme | Sony Channel | |
| 21. | Sony Marathi Gaurav Geet | Sony Marathi | |
| 22. | Indian Idol Marathi | Sony Marathi | Judge season 1 |
| 23. | Sunflower | Zee5 Web Series | Cameo |

=== Plays/drama soundtracks ===
| Sr.No. | Play/Drama Name | Notes/Awards |
|---|---|---|
| 1. | Sahi Re Sahi | Alpha Gaurav 2003 Award |
| 2. | Lochya Zala Re | Maharashtra Rajya Vyavsayik Natya Spardha Award |
| 3. | Mr. Na. Ma. Deo Mhane | |
| 4. | Gopala Re Gopala | |
| 5. | Kala Ya Laglya Jiva | 2007 Maharashtra Rajya Vyavsayik Natya Spardha Award |
| 6. | Jahale Chatrapati Shivray | |
| 7. | Man Udhaan Varyache | |
| 8. | The Great Indian Musical- Civilisation to Nation | 2023 Neeta Mukesh Ambani Cultural Centre Opening Show |

== Ajay as a playback singer ==
| Year | Film | Song | Composer | Co-artist |
|---|---|---|---|---|
| 2004 | Aga Bai Arrecha! | "Durge Durghat Bhari" | Ajay-Atul | Solo |
| 2004 | Aga Bai Arrecha! | "Malharwari" | Ajay-Atul | Krishnarao Sable |
| 2004 | Aga Bai Arrecha! | "Prabhat Geet" | Ajay-Atul | Vijay Prakash, Amey Date, Yogita Godbole, Bela Sulakhe |
| 2005 | Jatra | "Ye Go Ye Maina" | Ajay-Atul | Solo |
| 2005 | Savarkhed Ek Gaon | "Aai Bhavani Tujhya Krupene" | Ajay-Atul | Solo |
| 2005 | Vaah! Life Ho Toh Aisi! | "Hanuman Chalisa" | Ajay-Atul | Shankar Mahadevan |
| 2007 | Zabardast | "Zabardast Funda" | Ajay-Atul | Solo |
| 2007 | Zabardast | "Aaicha Gho" | Ajay-Atul | Swapnil Bandodkar |
| 2007 | Zabardast | "Baby Bol Bol" | Ajay-Atul | Solo |
| 2007 | Checkmate | "Checkmate" | Ajay-Atul | Earl D'Souza |
| 2008 | Tujhya Majhya Sansarala Ani Kay Hava! | "Jyotibacha Navana Changbhal" | Ajay-Atul | Atul Gogavale |
| 2008 | Tujhya Majhya Sansarala Ani Kay Hava! | "Kali Dharti" | Ajay-Atul | Solo |
| 2008 | Uladhaal | "Morya Morya" | Ajay-Atul | Solo |
| 2008 | Uladhaal | "Sab Dhoka Hain" | Ajay-Atul | Solo |
| 2008 | Bandh Premache | "Hi Avkhal Dekhni" | Ajay-Atul | Solo |
| 2009 | Jogwa | "Lallati Bhandar" | Ajay-Atul | Solo |
| 2010 | Natarang | "Apsara Aali" | Ajay-Atul | Bela Shende |
| 2010 | Natarang | "Khel Mandala" | Ajay-Atul | Solo |
| 2010 | Natarang | "Natarang Ubha" | Ajay-Atul | Atul Gogavale |
| 2010 | Natarang | "Achuk Padli Thingi" | Ajay-Atul | Solo |
| 2010 | Natarang | "Mathurechya Bajari" | Ajay-Atul | Bela Shende |
| 2010 | Natarang | "Kagal Gavcha Guna" | Ajay-Atul | Solo |
| 2010 | Natarang | "Petla Gadi" | Ajay-Atul | Solo |
| 2011 | Singham | "Saathiya" | Ajay-Atul | Shreya Ghoshal |
| 2012 | Agneepath | "Deva Shree Ganesha" | Ajay-Atul | Solo |
| 2013 | Fandry | "Tujhya Priticha Vinchu Mala" | Ajay-Atul | Solo |
| 2014 | Lai Bhaari | "Mauli Mauli" | Ajay-Atul | Solo |
| 2015 | Nilkanth Master | "Kaunse Des Chala" | Ajay-Atul | Shreya Ghoshal |
| 2015 | Nilkanth Master | "Vande Mataram" | Ajay-Atul | Atul Gogavale |
| 2015 | Double Seat | "Man Suddha Tuza" | Jasraj-Saurabh-Rishikesh | Priyanka Barve, Deepika Jog |
| 2015 | Deool Band | "Deva Vina" | Narendra Bhide | Solo |
| 2016 | Sairat | "Sairat Zaala Ji" | Ajay-Atul | Chinmayi Sripada |
| 2016 | Sairat | "Yad Lagla" | Ajay-Atul | Solo |
| 2016 | Sairat | "Zingaat" | Ajay-Atul | Atul Gogavale |
| 2016 | Jaundya Na Balasaheb | "Baby Bring It On" | Ajay-Atul | Solo |
| 2016 | Jaundya Na Balasaheb | "Vaat Disu De" | Ajay-Atul | Yogita Godbole |
| 2016 | Jaundya Na Balasaheb | "Gondhal" | Ajay-Atul | Solo |
| 2017 | Manasu Mallige | "Yaare Neenu Parivaala" | Ajay-Atul | Solo |
| 2017 | Manasu Mallige | "Ayyayyappo" | Ajay-Atul | Atul Gogavale |
| 2017 | Manasu Mallige | "Thangaliya Roopa" | Ajay-Atul | Chinmayi Sripada |
| 2017 | Bhikari | "Maagu Kasa Mi" | Vishal Mishra | Solo |
| 2017 | Ghuma | "Vanava Petala" | Jasraj-Saurabh-Rishikesh | Solo |
| 2018 | Mauli | "Majhi Pandharichi Maay" | Ajay-Atul | Solo |
| 2018 | Mauli | "Dhuvun Taak" | Ajay-Atul | Solo |
| 2018 | Mauli | "Maagu Kuna Haat Ra" | Ajay-Atul | Solo |
| 2018 | Dhadak | "Dhadak" | Ajay-Atul | Shreya Ghoshal |
| 2018 | Dhadak | "Zingaat" | Ajay-Atul | Atul Gogavale |
| 2018 | Dhadak | "Pehli Baar" | Ajay-Atul | Solo |
| 2018 | Dhadak | "Vaara Re" | Ajay-Atul | Solo |
| 2018 | Redu | "Devak Kalji Re" | Vijay Narayan Gavande | Solo |
| 2018 | Figght | "Kalana Kahi" | Swapnil Godbole | Solo |
| 2018 | Mantr | "Bolna Re Mana" | Avinash–Vishwajeet | Solo |
| 2018 | Tumbbad | "Tumbbad Title Track" | Ajay-Atul | Atul Gogavale |
| 2019 | Kulkarni Chaukatla Deshpande | "Sundara" | Narendra Bhide | Solo |
| 2021 | Basta | "Phul Jhultaya Yelicha" | Santosh Mulekar | Dipali Sathe |
| 2021 | Maay Baap Vitthala | "Maay Baap Vitthala" | Nitin Ugalmugale, Prasad Shinde | Atul Gogavale |
| 2021 | Soyrik | "Malvat" | Vijay Narayan Gavande | Solo |
| 2022 | Chandramukhi | "Kanha" | Ajay-Atul | Solo |
| 2022 | Lagan | "Payee Fufata" | Vijay Narayan Gavande | Solo |
| 2022 | Samrenu | "Samrenu" | Suraj-Dhiraj | Solo |
| 2022 | Gulhar | "Aabhalana Pankh" | Padmanabh Gaikwad | Solo |
| 2022 | Ved | "Sukh Kalale" | Ajay-Atul | Shreya Ghoshal |
| 2022 | Ved | "Ved Lavlay" | Ajay-Atul | Vishal Dadlani |
| 2023 | Jaggu Ani Juliet | "Mana" | Ajay-Atul | Solo |
| 2023 | Jaggu Ani Juliet | "Bhavi Amdar" | Ajay-Atul | Atul Gogavale |
| 2023 | Maharashtra Shahir | "Baharla Ha Madhumas" | Ajay-Atul | Shreya Ghoshal |
| 2023 | Maharashtra Shahir | "Jai Jai Maharashtra Maza" | Ajay-Atul | Krishnarao Sable |
| 2023 | Maharashtra Shahir | "Gau Nako Kisna" | Ajay-Atul | Jayesh Khare, Mayur Sukale |
| 2023 | Maharashtra Shahir | "Ambabai Gondhalala Ye" | Ajay-Atul | Solo |
| 2023 | Maharashtra Shahir | "Paula Thakala Nahi" | Ajay-Atul | Solo |
| 2023 | Umbrella | "Vangaal Vangaal" | Santosh Mulekar | Solo |
| 2023 | Adipurush | "Shivoham" | Ajay-Atul | Solo |
| 2023 | Jindgani | "Sutale Dhage" | Vijay Narayan Gavande | Solo |
| 2023 | Sarla Ek Koti | "Kevadyacha Paan Tu" | Vijay Narayan Gavande | Aarya Ambekar |
| 2023 | Baaplyok | "Umgaya Baap" | Vijay Narayan Gavande | Solo |
| 2024 | Mitra | "Vanvya Madhye Garvya Sarkha" | Nitin Ugalmugale | Apurva Nishad |
| 2024 | Madgaon Express | "Baby Bring It On" | Ajay-Atul | Nikhita Gandhi |
| 2024 | Sangharsh Yoddha Manoj Jarange Patil | "Udhalin Jeev" | Vijay Narayan Gavande | Solo |
| 2024 | Danka Hari Namacha | "Majha Vitthal" | Abhinay Jagtap | Solo |
| 2024 | Yek Number | "Jahir Zalay Jagala" | Ajay-Atul | Shreya Ghoshal |
| 2025 | Ata Thambaycha Naay! | "Ata Thambaycha Naay - Title Track" | Gulraj Singh | Aanandi Joshi |
| 2025 | Dashavtar | "Rangpooja" | AV Prafullachandra | Solo |
| 2025 | Gondhal | "Chandana" | Ilaiyaraaja | Aarya Ambekar |
| 2025 | Smart Sunbai | "Sath De Tujhi Jara" | Vijay Narayan Gavande | Savani Ravindra |
| 2026 | Peter | "Josh Jawani" | Rithvik Muralidhar | Trilok Trivikram |
| 2026 | Salbardi | "Jagdambe" | Padmanabh Gaikwad | Solo |
| 2026 | Raja Shivaji | "Raja Shivaji Anthem – Chhatrapati" | Ajay-Atul | Solo |
| 2026 | Raja Shivaji | "Jai Shivray" | Ajay-Atul | Solo |
| 2026 | Raja Shivaji | "Bhau Sambha" | Ajay-Atul | Solo |
| 2026 | Raja Shivaji | "Sata Janmachi Gath" | Ajay-Atul | Solo |
| 2026 | The Maharashtra Files | "Man Pakharu" | Ajit-Nitin | Solo |
| 2026 | Ghabadkund | "Vaari Tujhi Chal Ekla" | Vijay Narayan Gavande | Solo |
| 2026 | Ek Hota Malin | "Ghadi Bharcha Khel Sara" | Yuvraj Gongle | Solo |
| 2026 | Bandhu | "Bhau Kay Bandhu Kay" | Vijay Narayan Gavande | Atul Gogavale |

== Ajay-Atul as lyricist ==
| Year | Song | Film | Director |
|---|---|---|---|
| 2016 | "Yad Lagla" | Sairat | Nagraj Manjule |
| 2016 | "Sairat Zaala Ji" | Sairat | Nagraj Manjule |
| 2016 | "Zingaat" | Sairat | Nagraj Manjule |
| 2016 | "Aatach Baya Ka Baavarla" | Sairat | Nagraj Manjule |
| 2016 | "Dolby Walya" | Jaundya Na Balasaheb | Girish Kulkarni |
| 2016 | "Baby Bring It On" | Jaundya Na Balasaheb | Girish Kulkarni |
| 2016 | "Gondhal" | Jaundya Na Balasaheb | Girish Kulkarni |
| 2022 | "Aaya Ye Jhund Hai" | Jhund | Nagraj Manjule |
| 2022 | "Sukh Kalale" | Ved | Riteish Deshmukh |
| 2022 | "Ved Lavlay" | Ved | Riteish Deshmukh |
| 2022 | "Ved Tujha" | Ved | Riteish Deshmukh |
| 2022 | "My One And Only Prem" | Ved | Riteish Deshmukh |
| 2022 | "Besuri" | Ved | Riteish Deshmukh |
| 2023 | "Mana" | Jaggu Ani Juliet | Mahesh Limaye |
| 2023 | "Bhavi Amdar" | Jaggu Ani Juliet | Mahesh Limaye |
| 2024 | "Yek Number Title Song" | Yek Number | Rajesh Mapuskar |
| 2026 | "Raja Shivaji Anthem – Chhatrapati" | Raja Shivaji | Riteish Deshmukh |
| 2026 | "Jay Shivray" | Raja Shivaji | Riteish Deshmukh |
| 2026 | "Bhau Sambhal" | Raja Shivaji | Riteish Deshmukh |
| 2026 | "Phool Parijat" | Raja Shivaji | Riteish Deshmukh |
| 2026 | "Sata Janmachi Gath" | Raja Shivaji | Riteish Deshmukh |
