= List of Marathi songs recorded by Shreya Ghoshal =

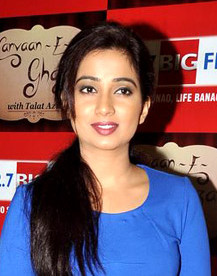
Ghoshal at "Carvaan-E-Ghazal" celebrations

Shreya Ghoshal (born 12 March 1984) is an Indian playback singer. She sings in Hindi, Tamil, Telugu, Malayalam, Kannada, Marathi, Gujarati, Bengali, Assamese, Nepali, Oriya, Bhojpuri, Punjabi and Tulu languages. Ghoshal's career began when she won the Sa Re Ga Ma Pa contest as an adult. Her Bollywood playback singing career began with Sanjay Leela Bhansali's Devdas, for which she received her first National Film Award for Best Female Playback Singer along with Filmfare Award for Best Female Playback Singer and Filmfare RD Burman Award for New Music Talent. Since then, she has received many other awards. Apart from playback singing, Ghoshal has appeared as a judge on several television reality shows. She performs in musical concerts around the world. She was also honored from the U.S. state of Ohio, where the governor Ted Strickland declared 26 June 2010 as "Shreya Ghoshal Day". In April 2013, she was awarded with the highest honour in London by the selected members of "House of Commons of the United Kingdom". In July 2015, John Cranley, the Mayor of the City of Cincinnati also honoured her by proclaiming 24 July 2015 as "Shreya Ghoshal Day of Entertainment and Inspiration" in Cincinnati. She was also featured five times in Forbes list of the top 100 celebrities of India. In 2017, Ghoshal became the first Indian singer to have a wax statute of her in Madame Tussauds Museum, Delhi. She also debuted as producer with her first single Dhadkane Azad Hain.

After a huge success of Devdas album Ghoshal was immediately called by various regional film industries for recording songs in her voice. She has recorded more than fifty songs in Marathi language with back to back hits. In 2009, she received her fourth National Film Award for Best Female Playback Singer for the songs "Jeev Rangla" from Marathi movie Jogwa and "Pherari Mon" from Bengali movie Antaheen. She sang more than 70 songs in Marathi.

Given below is the list of songs recorded by Shreya Ghoshal in the Marathi language :-

== Film Songs ==
She sang more than 60 film songs in Marathi.

=== 2005 ===
Film	No	Song	Composer(s)	Writer(s)	Co-artist(s)
Pak Pak Pakaak	1	"Aaji Mhanti"	K. C. Loy, Aashish Rego	Sanjay More	Yash Narvekar

=== 2007 ===
Film	No	Song	Composer(s)	Writer(s)	Co-artist(s)
Ishhya	2	"Dohale Purva"	Sarang Dev	Kshitiz Zarapkar	Solo

=== 2009 ===
Film	No	Song	Composer(s)	Writer(s)	Co-artist(s)
Samaantar	3	"Nuste Nuste Dole Bhartana"(Duet)	Anand Modak	Sowmitra	Shankar Mahadevan
Samaantar	4	"Kai Jahale Tula Mana Re"	Anand Modak	Sowmitra	Solo
Samaantar	5	"Nuste Nuste Dole Bhartana"(Female)	Anand Modak	Sowmitra	Solo
Jogwa	6	"Man Raanat Gela"	Ajay–Atul	Sanjay Patil	Solo
Jogwa	7	"Jeev Rangla"	Ajay–Atul	Sanjay Patil	Hariharan
Gaiir	8	"Sahi Kya Hai" (Dance Mix)	Avinash-Vishwajeet	Shrirang Godbole	Solo
Sundar Majhe Ghar	9	"Sur Aale Shabd Lyale"	Madhurani Gokhale	Nitin Aakhwe	Solo

=== 2010 ===
Film	No	Song	Composer(s)	Writer(s)	Co-artist(s)
Anandi Anand	10	"Dete Kon Dete"	Saleel Kulkarni	Sandeep Khare	Saleel Kulkarni
Anandi Anand	11	"Dhim Tana"	Saleel Kulkarni	Sandeep Khare	Solo
Mani Mangalsutra	12	"Mangalagauri"	Avadhoot Gupte	—N/a	Solo

=== 2011 ===
Film	No	Song	Composer(s)	Writer(s)	Co-artist(s)
Aarambh	13	"Ha Natyancha Khel Andhala"	Anand Modak	Sudhir Moghe	Solo
Arjun	14	"Gaar Gaar Ha Pawan Bawra"	Lalit Sen	Zaheer Kalam	Solo

=== 2012 ===
Film	No	Song	Composer(s)	Writer(s)	Co-artist(s)
Bharatiya	15	"Aai Yai Yo"	Ajay–Atul	Guru Thakur	Solo
Swapna Tujhe Ni Majhe	16	"Kare Re Mana Ka Asa"	Siddharth Mahadevan	Manoj Yadav	Solo
Yedyanchi Jatra	17	"Kaata Rutla"	Kshitij Wagh	Guru Thakur	Sachin Pandit

=== 2014 ===
Film	No	Song	Composer(s)	Writer(s)	Co-artist(s)
Lai Bhaari	18	"Jeev Bhulala"	Ajay–Atul	Guru Thakur	Sonu Nigam
Lai Bhaari	19	"Ye Na Saajna"	Ajay–Atul	Guru Thakur	Solo
Aashiyana	20	"Sayaba"	Prabhakar Narwade	Rajesh Bamugade	Solo
Happy Journey	21	"Ka Saang Na"	Karan Kulkarni	Kshitij Patwardhan	Swapnil Bandodkar

=== 2015 ===
Film	No	Song	Composer(s)	Writer(s)	Co-artist(s)
Prime Time	22	"Pavsat"	Niranjan Pedgaonkar	Prashant Jamdar	Solo
Dhol Taashe	23	"Maaganya Aadhich"	Nilesh Moharir	Guru Thakur	Swapnil Bandodkar
Carry On Maratha	24	"Sobane Soyanire"	Shail Hada, Pritesh Mehta	Ashwini Shende	Shail Hada
Nilkanth Master	25	"Adhir Man Zaale"	Ajay-Atul	Gajendra Ahire	Solo
Nilkanth Master	26	"Partuni Yena"	Ajay-Atul	Gajendra Ahire	Javed Ali
Nilkanth Master	27	"Kaun Se Des Chala"	Ajay-Atul	Gajendra Ahire	Ajay Gogavle
Double Seat	28	"Mohini"	Hrishikesh Datar, Saurabh Bhalerao, Jasraj Jayant Joshi	Kshitij Patwardhan	Jasraj Jayant Joshi

=== 2016 ===
Film	No	Song	Composer(s)	Writer(s)	Co-artist(s)
Sairat	29	"Aatach Baya Ka Baavarla"	Ajay–Atul	Nagraj Manjule	Solo
7, Roshan Villa	30	"Julun Yeti"	Avinash–Vishwajeet	Shrirang Godbole	Solo
Jaundya Na Balasaheb	31	"Mona Darling"	Ajay–Atul	Vaibhav Joshi	Suman Sridhar, Sonu Nigam, Kunal Ganjawala
Kaul Manacha	32	"Man Manjiri"	Rohan-Rohan	Manoj Yadav	Armaan Malik

=== 2017 ===
Film	No	Song	Composer(s)	Lyricist(s)	Co-artist(s)
Karaar	33	"Sajana Re"	Vijay Narayan Gavande	Guru Thakur	Jasraj Jayant Joshi
F.U. - Friendship Unlimited	34	"Darmiyaan"	Vishal Mishra, Samir Saptiskar	Sanjeev Chaturvedi	Vishal Mishra
Chi Va Chi Sau Ka	35	"Man He"	Narendra Bhide	Paresh Mokashi	Swapnil Bandodkar
Chi Va Chi Sau Ka	36	"Man He"(Sad)	Narendra Bhide	Paresh Mokashi	Swapnil Bandodkar
Zindagi Virat	37	"Makhmali"	Suraj-Dhiraj	Mandar Cholkar	Sonu Nigam
Deva : Ek Atrangee	38	"Roj Roj Navyane"(Duet)	Amitraj	Kshitij Patwardhan	Sonu Nigam
Deva : Ek Atrangee	39	"Roj Roj Navyane"(Female)	Amitraj	Kshitij Patwardhan	Solo

=== 2018 ===
Film	No	Song	Composer(s)	Lyricist(s)	Co-artist(s)
Bucket List	40	"Houn Jau Dya"	Rohan-Rohan	Mandar Cholkar	Sadhana Sargam, Shaan
Bucket List	41	"Tu Pari"	Rohan-Rohan	Mandar Cholkar	Rohan Pradhan
Majha Agadbam	42	"Preeti Sumne"	Satish Chakravarthy	Mangesh Kangne	Satish Chakravarthy
Majha Agadbam	43	"Haluwara"	Satish Chakravarthy	Mangesh Kangne	Solo
Patil	44	"Dhin Tak Dhin"	Anand–Milind	Sameer	Babul Supriyo
Mauli	45	"Bindhast Houn Dashing Yena"	Ajay–Atul	Guru Thakur	Karthik

=== 2019 ===
Film	No	Song	Composer(s)	Lyricist(s)	Co-artist(s)
Premwaari	46	"Baghata Tula Me"	Amitraj	Guru Thakur, Mandar Cholkar	Sonu Nigam
Dhumas	47	"Man Bharun Aalaya"	P. Shankaram	Avinash Kale	Sonu Nigam
WhatsApp Love	48	"Javal Ye Na"	Nitin Shankar	Ajita Kale	Javed Ali
Kulkarni Chaukatla Deshpande	49	"Rangaari"	Soumil, Siddarth	Gajendra Ahire	Solo

=== 2020 ===
Film	No	Song	Composer(s)	Lyricist(s)	Co-artist(s)
Prawaas	50	"Prawaas"(Reprise)	Salim–Sulaiman	Guru Thakur	Solo
Bonus	51	"Navasa Ishara"	Rohan-Rohan	Manndar Cholkar	Rohan Pradhan

=== 2022 ===
Film	No	Song	Composer(s)	Lyricist(s)	Co-artist(s)
Me Vasantrao	52	"Sakali Uthu"	Rahul Deshpande	Traditional	Solo
Me Vasantrao	53	"Ram Ram Lori"(Female)	Rahul Deshpande	Mangesh Kangne	Solo
Chandramukhi	54	"Chandra"	Ajay–Atul	Guru Thakur	Solo
Chandramukhi	55	"To Chand Rati"	Ajay–Atul	Guru Thakur	Solo
Ved	56	"Sukh Kalale"	Ajay–Atul	Ajay-Atul	Solo

=== 2023 ===
Film	No	Song	Composer(s)	Lyricist(s)	Co-artist(s)
Maharashtra Shahir	57	"Baharla Ha Madhumas"	Ajay–Atul	Guru Thakur	Ajay Gogavale
Baloch	58	"Khulya Jivala"	Narendra Bhide	Guru Thakur	Solo
Jhimma 2	59	"Rang Jarasa Ola"	Amitraj	Kshitij Patwardhan	Amitraj

=== 2024 ===
Film	No	Song	Composer(s)	Lyricist(s)	Co-artist(s)
Yek Number	60	"Jahir Zhala Jagala"	Ajay–Atul	Guru Thakur	Ajay Gogavale
Dharmarakshak Mahaveer Chhatrapati Sambhaji Maharaj	61	"Vaat Pahe Shambhuraya"	Mohit Kulkarni	Dr. Prasad Biware	Solo

=== 2026 ===
Film	No	Song	Composer(s)	Lyricist(s)	Co-artist(s)
Raja Shivaji	62	"Phool Parijaat"	Ajay-Atul	Ajay-Atul	Solo
Deool Band 2	63	"Pretaroop"	Ruturaj Sathye	Sant Tukaram	Solo

== Non-film songs ==
She sang more than 14 Non-Film songs in Marathi.

=== 1999 ===
Film	Song	Composer(s)	Lyricist(s)	Co-artist(s)
Krushna Majha	"Chanchal Ha Manmohan Ga"	Milind Joshi	Aruna Dhere	
Krushna Majha	"Ajun Taralate Drushtipudhti"	Milind Joshi	Aruna Dhere	
Krushna Majha	"Hari Ha Majha Pranvisava"	Milind Joshi	Aruna Dhere	
Krushna Majha	"Kai Bai Naval He"	Milind Joshi	Aruna Dhere	

=== 2002 ===
Film	Song	Composer(s)	Lyricist(s)	Co-artist(s)
Ajinkya Bharat	"Garja Jayjaykar"	Swatantryaveer Sawarkar	Swatantryaveer Sawarkar	Cornell University Chorus
Ajinkya Bharat	"Jayostute"	Swatantryaveer Sawarkar	Swatantryaveer Sawarkar	
Ajinkya Bharat	"Ne Majasi Ne"	Swatantryaveer Sawarkar	Swatantryaveer Sawarkar	Ravindra Sathe
Ajinkya Bharat	"Ushakal Hota Hota"	Swatantryaveer Sawarkar	Swatantryaveer Sawarkar	Ravindra Sathe
Ajinkya Bharat	"Vande Mataram"	Hemant Kumar	Bankim Chandra Chattopadhyay	Cornell University Chorus

=== 2015 ===
Film	Song	Composer(s)	Lyricist(s)	Co-artist(s)
Tumcha Aamcha Same Asta	"Tumcha Aamcha Same Asta"	Hrishikesh Datar, Saurabh Bhalerao, Jasraj Jayant Joshi	Kshitij Patwardhan	Hrishikesh Ranade

=== 2016 ===
Film	Song	Composer(s)	Lyricist(s)	Co-artist(s)
Khulta Kali Khulena	"Khulta Kali Khulena"	Samir Saptiskar	Abhishek Khankar	

=== 2017 ===
Film	Song	Composer(s)	Lyricist(s)	Co-artist(s)
Paus Ha	"Paus Ha"	Kiran Vilas Khot	Kiran Vilas Khot	
Radha Prem Rangi Rangli	"Radha Prem Rangi Rangli"	Rohan-Rohan	Manndar Cholkar	

=== 2020 ===
Film	Song	Composer(s)	Lyricist(s)	Co-artist(s)
Sony Marathi Theme Song	Vinuya Atut Naati	Ajay–Atul	Guru Thakur	Ajay–Atul & Chorus
