= Zee Chitra Gaurav Puraskar for Best Music Director =

Award in India

- Awarded for: Best Performance by a Music Director
- Country: India
- Presented by: Zee Marathi
- First award: Ajay–Atul, Jogwa (2009)
- Currently held by: Gulraj Singh, Paani (2025)

The Zee Chitra Gaurav Puraskar for Best Music Director is presented by Zee Marathi as part of its annual Zee Chitra Gaurav Puraskar, for best music done by a composer in Marathi films, who are selected by the jury. Ajay-Atul has won most awards in this category.

== Awards ==
Year	Music Director	Film	Ref.
2008	Ajay–Atul	Bandh Premache	
2009	Ajay–Atul	Jogwa	
2010	Ajay–Atul	Natarang	
2011	Ajit Parab	Huppa Huiyya	
2012	Narendra Bhide	Paulwat	
2013	Kaushal Inamdar	Ajintha	
2014	Nilesh Moharir	Jai Maharashtra Dhaba Bhatinda	
2015	Ajay–Atul	Lai Bhaari	
2016	Shankar–Ehsaan–Loy	Katyar Kaljat Ghusali	
2017	Ajay–Atul	Sairat	
2018	Narendra Bhide, Aditya Bedekar	Hampi	
2019	Sayali Khare	Nude	
2020	Hrishikesh–Jasraj–Saurabh	Anandi Gopal	
2021	Not Awarded		
2022	Ajay–Atul	Sairat	
2023	Ajay–Atul	Chandramukhi	
2023	Ajay–Atul	Ved	
2023	Saleel Kulkarni	Ekda Kay Zala	
2023	Rahul Deshpande	Me Vasantrao	
2023	Avadhoot Gupte	Pandu	
2024	Ajay–Atul	Maharashtra Shahir	
2024	Amitraj	Jhimma 2	
2024	Gulraj Singh	Unaad	
2024	Sai–Piyush	Baipan Bhaari Deva	
2024	Vijay Narayan Gavande	Baaplyok	
2025	Gulraj Singh	Paani	
2025	Avinash–Vishwajeet	Phullwanti	
2025	Sanket Sane	Gharat Ganpati	
2025	Bhushan Mate	Amaltash	
