= Dolby Walya =

- Official song cover

Song by Nagesh Morwekar and Earl Edgar

from the album Jaundya Na Balasaheb
- Language: Marathi
- Released: 20 September 2016
- Genre: Dance; Indi-pop
- Length: 5:07
- Label: Zee Music Company
- Songwriter(s): Ajay-Atul
- Composer(s): Ajay-Atul
- Producer(s): Saarrthi Entertainment; Arbhaat Films; Ajay-Atul Productions

Jaundya Na Balasaheb track listing
- 1. "Dolby Walya"; 2. "Gondhal"; 3. "Baby Bring It On"; 4. "Mona Darling"; 5. "Vaat Disu De"

Music video
- Dolby Walya on YouTube

"Dolby Walya" is the dance number from the 2016 film Jaundya Na Balasaheb, directed by Girish Kulkarni, who also featured in the song. Sung by Nagesh Morwekar and Earl Edgar (rap) and composed by Ajay-Atul, who also penned the lyrics. The song later gained a cult following after it was reused as a background score in the action sequence just before the interval in the 2023 blockbuster, Animal.

== Background ==
The song is written and composed by Ajay-Atul and sung by Nagesh Morwekar and Earl Edgar.

== Release ==
The song was officially released on 20 September 2016 before the release of the film.

== Critical reception ==
Vipin Nair of The Hindu wrote "matching the song’s craziness and energy perfectly, even as Ajay-Atul concocts a heady mix of percussion-heavy folk music and electronic elements in the backdrop. The accelerated electronic coda with the chipmunk-ish voice is an overkill though." Manish Gaekwad of Scroll.in called it "alarming and addictive" and observed it sounds like one half of Ajay-Atul turned up the volume while the Gogavale brother ensured that the unhinged energy has a rhythm on which to rely.

== In popular culture ==
- Sandeep Reddy Vanga reused the song as a background score in the film Animal.
