= Ventilator (2016 film) =

2016 film by Rajesh Mapuskar

- Theatrical release poster
- Directed by: Rajesh Mapuskar
- Screenplay by: Rajesh Mapuskar
- Produced by: Priyanka Chopra; Madhu Chopra
- Starring: Ashutosh Gowariker; Jitendra Joshi; Sulbha Arya; Sukanya Kulkarni
- Cinematography: Savita Singh
- Edited by: Rameshwar S. Bhagat
- Music by: Rohan-Rohan
- Production company: Purple Pebble Pictures
- Distributed by: Zee Studios
- Release date: 4 November 2016
- Running time: 130 minutes
- Country: India
- Language: Marathi
- Budget: ₹35 million (US$550,000)
- Box office: est. ₹250 million (US$4 million)

Ventilator is a 2016 Indian Marathi-language comedy drama film written and directed by Rajesh Mapuskar and produced by Priyanka Chopra. The film features an ensemble cast of more than 100 actors, including Ashutosh Gowariker, Jitendra Joshi, Sulbha Arya, and Sukanya Kulkarni. It tells the story of the Kamerkar family, whose oldest and most beloved member enters a coma and is put on a medical ventilator a few days before the Ganesh Chaturthi festival celebrations.

Mapuskar conceived the film after one of his family members was hospitalised and put on a ventilator; he started writing the script after noting the reaction of his family members, trying to treat the difficult situation with humour. On its completion, he approached several producers, who were sceptical and tried to discourage him from making it in Marathi. Later, Chopra accepted it to produce under her production company Purple Pebble Pictures.

The film was released on 4 November 2016 in Maharashtra and several other cities in India. Ventilator received widespread critical acclaim, garnering praise for its direction, screenplay, cast performances, music and its treatment of humour and emotion. Made on a small budget of ₹35 million (US$550,000), the film was a commercial success, earning ₹250 million (US$4 million) at the box office. As of October 2017, Ventilator is the 10th highest-grossing Marathi film of all time.

Ventilator won three awards at the 64th National Film Awards; Best Director for Mapuskar, Best Editing and Best Sound Mixing. The film was nominated in 16 categories at the 2017 Filmfare Marathi Awards; including Best Film, Best Director for Mapuskar, Best Actor for Joshi, Best Supporting Actor for Gowariker and Best Supporting Actress for Kulkarni. It won five categories, including Best Screenplay. The film was remade in Gujarati in 2018 under the same title.

== Plot ==
Every year, the Kamerkar family assembles in their ancestral village to celebrate the Ganesh Chaturthi festival. Three days before the festival, a doyen of the family — the much-loved and respected Gajanan Karmerkar, who is fondly known as Gajju Kaka — passes into a state of coma. He is placed on life support — a medical ventilator — in a hospital in Mumbai. Gajanan's nephew, Raja Kamerkar, a popular Bollywood film director, receives this news from his father during a screening of his film starring Priyanka Chopra, who suggests Raja leave for the hospital. Gajju Kaka has been extremely kind to Raja, who is having some issues with his own father. On his way to the hospital, Raja informs everyone, including the family in the village, about the situation. Although his relatives are worried about Gajju Kaka, they are also worried about the upcoming festivities. Gajju Kaka's death during the festival would mean a period of mourning, spoiling their festive plans.

All of the family members and their neighbours visit Gajju Kaka in the hospital, praying to Lord Ganesha for his speedy recovery. Gajanan's wife, Manda, and their son, Prasanna, are happy to see Raja at the hospital, while others are excited about Raja's upcoming film and his popularity. Raja meets everyone in the hospital, most of whom are occupied with concerns other than Gajju Kaka's health. Raja is amused by the chaos around the family members and their different attitudes to the situation. Even in this difficult time, Prasanna is busy with political endeavours and his plans to win a competition to prove himself to his boss. Meanwhile, Pritam, Prassana's and Raja's cousin from the village, is on his way with his uncle (Gajju Kaka's older, unmarried brother), his mother, father, wife, and other relatives.

Prasanna has a dysfunctional relationship with his father, Gajju Kaka, of which all the family members are aware. On the contrary, Prasanna's sister, Sarika, shares a deep relationship with their father. Manda reminds Prasanna that Gajju Kaka had always loved him and that Prasanna should have been there for him. Prasanna's employer dismisses him and gives his job to his assistant. The family from the village arrives, only to be shocked to learn about the ventilator and that Gajju Kaka will always depend on it. Prasanna decides to keep Gajju Kaka on the ventilator until the following afternoon and the family understands. Raja, who had problems with his own father, requests Prasanna to visit Gajju Kaka's and see him for the last time. Prasanna reveals his anger towards his father and how he could not be like "his favourite Raja", and that Gajju Kaka never understood him and overlooked him in favour of his sister Sarika.

The next day, Raja and Prasanna's cousin, Lata, arrives from the United States with her husband and their young son. The boy has drawn a family tree, which he presents to the whole family. He enquires Prasanna about his father, and Prasanna informs the child his father never loved him. After overhearing this, Raja's father and Gajju Kaka's brother remind Prasanna about all the difficulties Gajju Kaka faced after Prasanna was born with a thin nostril, and contrary to Prasanna's belief, how much Gajju Kaka loved him. This changes Prassana's opinion, and he rushes to the ward to order the doctors to let his father remain on the ventilator as he makes peace with Gajanan. He rejoins his mother and sister, and they all embrace each other. This gives confidence to Raja, who tries to bury his misunderstanding with his own father. While still on the ventilator, Gajju Kaka is seen smiling.

== Cast ==
- Ashutosh Gowariker as Raja Kamerkar
- Jitendra Joshi as Prasanna Kamerkar
- Sulbha Arya as Manda (Prasanna's mother)
- Sukanya Kulkarni as Sarika (Prasanna's sister)
- Viju Khote as Shirish Appa
- Sanjiv Shah as Ashwin
- Nilesh Divekar as Sai
- Kirti Adarkar as Lata
- Tanvi Abhyankar as Rucha
- Rahul Solapurkar as Nandan
- Shashank Shende as Politician Zantey
- Achyut Potdar as Bhau's younger brother
- Usha Nadkarni as Akka
- Nikhil Ratnaparkhi as Pritam
- Swati Chitnis as Indu
- Satish Alekar as Bhau (Raja's father)
- Deepak Shirke as Aatma Dhadke
- Sumedh Mudgalkar as Karan
- Abhijeet Chavan as Ajit
- Roop as Jai
- Narayan Jadhav as Anna Vinay's Father
- Raja Bapat as Gajju Kaka, main patient in hospital
- Gautam Berde as Doctor
- Vijay Nikam as Subhash Kaka
- Purnima Ahire as Raja's Maid
- Boman Irani as Dr. Shroff
- Rohan Mapuskar as Jr. Doctor
- Nitin Jadhav
- Sonamoni Gadkari as Ms. Iyer (Nurse)
- Namrata Sambherao as Rashmi
- Prabhakar More as Village Priest
- Jayant Gadekar as Gurav
- Rucha Inamdar as Girl on the phone
- Mukund Bhatt as Decorator
- Priyanka Chopra as herself

== Production ==
Ventilator was directed by Rajesh Mapuskar and produced by Priyanka Chopra under her production company Purple Pebble Pictures. Chopra's mother Madhu Chopra also served as producer on the film and looked after its production. It was distributed by Zee Studios.

Mapuskar had the idea for the film when a family member was hospitalised and put on a medical ventilator. According to the director, the word "ventilator" became a part of his daily life and he began to follow the stories of the people undergoing medical treatment. In an interview with Scroll.in, Mapuskar recalled how relatives of people who were under medical treatment made efforts "to treat life with humour in the face of death. That is how the story was born in my mind, and I began to write it". After completing the script, he approached several filmmakers, who thought it was "a great script" but were skeptical of producing it. He revealed that these people tried to discourage him from making it in Marathi, since his debut film Ferrari Ki Sawaari (2013) was in Hindi. They thought going from Hindi to Marathi would be a downgrade. However, he was confident the film would be a Marathi production. He said "It makes economic sense to make the film in Marathi, where better scripts are accepted and projects are wrapped up in record time".

At the same time, Priyanka Chopra set up Purple Pebble Pictures and was looking for content-driven, regional cinema scripts. After reading the script, Chopra was impressed and immediately agreed to produce the film under her production company. She said, "It's one single moment that defines the best of the film. It is funny, ironical and a deeply moving tale that will leave you laughing and crying. I am very lucky to have such a talented collection of actors coming together for my debut Marathi production." Rajesh Mapuskar believed that having Chopra as producer helped to create a larger market for the film. When Mapuskar approached Ashutosh Gowariker with the script, he assumed Mapuskar wanted him to produce the film. However, despite liking the script, he declined after learning that he wanted Gowariker to act. Gowariker, who had last acted in a film 18 years earlier, was shocked at the idea of returning to acting. He was also busy with his own directorial venture. After six months, Mapuskar approached him again; Gowariker insisted on an audition so he could be rejected. He finally agreed after getting a phone call from Chopra, who insisted he do the film; they had previously worked together on What's Your Raashee? (2009).

=== Filming ===
Principal photography began on 10 February 2016 in Mumbai. Sonal Kharade designed the costumes for the entire cast, Savita Singh handled the cinematography and Nikhil S. Kovale was in charge of the art direction. Filming of the hospital scenes began in May 2016; most of the film was shot in the Kurla's Kohinoor Hospital, where a daycare unit was converted into an ICU. Chopra filmed her cameo appearance and the music video for "Baba" in a three-day schedule which was completed on 2 July 2016. The filming was completed in 34 days. Rameshwar S. Bhagat edited the film while Alok De did the sound mixing.

== Soundtrack ==
Ventilator

Soundtrack album by Rohan Gokhale, Rohan Pradhan
- Released: 7 October 2016
- Genre: Feature film soundtrack
- Length: 15:38
- Language: Marathi
- Label: Zee Music Company

The soundtrack album consists of four original songs composed by the duo Rohan Gokhale and Rohan Pradhan. The lyrics were written by Manoj Yadav, and Shantaram Mapuskar co-wrote one of song's lyrics with Yadav. The music was digitally released on 7 October 2016 by Zee Music Company. It was released on physical media on 21 October 2016 at an event in Mumbai.

Priyanka Chopra also recorded a song titled "Baba" for the film, making her Marathi singing debut, which was released on 3 November 2016. The music directors wanted her to record a female version but she was apprehensive about singing in Marathi. However, she later decided to record the song as she found the composition "powerful and moving". This song was not used in the film but as a promotional song with a music video that featured Chopra recording the song in a studio and several scenes from the film.

Track listing
No.	Title	Lyrics	Singer(s)	Length
1.	"Baba" (Male)	Manoj Yadav	Rohan Pradhan	04:00
2.	"Baba" (Female)	Manoj Yadav	Priyanka Chopra	04:00
3.	"Ya Re Ya"	Manoj Yadav, Shantaram Mapuskar	Rohan Pradhan	03:20
4.	"Jai Deva"	Manoj Yadav	Ganesh Chandanshive, Rohan Gokhale, Rohan Pradhan	04:18
Total length:				15:38

== Release ==
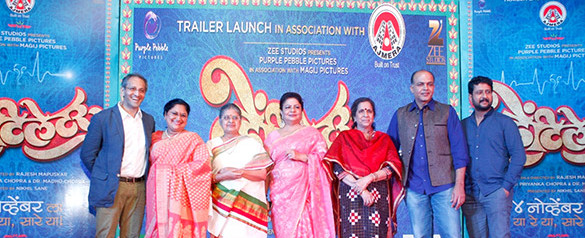
From left to right: Mapuskar, Kulkarni Mone, Arya, Madhu Chopra, Nadkarni, Gowariker and Joshi at Ventilator's theatrical trailer launch.

The first poster of the film was unveiled by Priyanka Chopra on 31 August 2016 on her Instagram account. Between 7 October 2016 to 11 October 2016, two teaser trailers—which were deemed "promising" and "interesting" by the media—were released. Following the teasers, a three-minute-long trailer was released on 18 October 2016; this was well-received by the media and audiences, with NDTV noting the trailer "promises both laugh-out-loud moments and also instances that move you". The music video of "Baba" was used to promote the film.

Ventilator premiered at the 18th Mumbai Film Festival on 24 October 2016. Made on a small budget of ₹35 million (US$550,000), Ventilator was released on 4 November 2016 in Maharashtra, and accompanied by English subtitles in several other cities including Gujarat, Goa, Madhya Pradesh, Delhi, Karnataka, Andhra Pradesh and Telangana. It opened to a positive response at the box office, did good business in its first weekend and continues to perform well in its first week. The film continued to do well in its second weekend; revenues held up well despite the Indian government's surprise currency demonetisation and other big-budget Bollywood and regional films. The film was a commercial success, earning ₹250 million (US$4 million) at the box office. As of October 2017, Ventilator is the 10th highest-grossing Marathi film of all time.

Distributed by Everest Entertainment, it was released on DVD on 26 April 2017 in all regions in a single-disc pack. A VCD version was released at the same time. The film's Blu-ray version was released on 6 June 2017. The world television premiere occurred on 29 January 2017 on Zee Marathi.

== Reception ==
Ventilator has received widespread critical acclaim from critics. Rachit Gupta of Filmfare gave it 4 stars out of 5, calling it an "achievement in handling extended ensemble casts and genuine human emotions with great effect", and said it "serves up humour, anger, hatred, envy, sorrow, regret and myriad human emotions with flawless impact. You’ll laugh and cry through this film at the drop of many a hat." Gupta added, "Ventilator is one of the most honest and emotional films of the year. It's a Marathi film worth treasuring. It's an Indian film worth celebrating." ABP Majha also gave the film a rating of 4 stars out of 5, praising the film's direction, writing, casting, music and sound design.

Mihir Bhanage, writing for The Times of India, also gave the film 4 stars out of 5 and wrote, "The list of must-watch Marathi films of recent times just registered an addition in the form of 'Ventilator'. This Priyanka Chopra production is a beautiful journey of relationships, emotions, misunderstandings and priorities that are a part of many families." Hemant Waje of Rediff.com gave the film 3.5 out of 5, calling it "a refreshing family drama" and saying the characterisation is its biggest strength: "Rajesh Mapuskar has made sure that he uniquely introduces each and every character and their relationship, forming a strong base for the film. He allows each one to express themselves."

Kunal Guha of Mumbai Mirror gave a rating of 3.5 stars out of 5 and said that Mapuskar handled the film carefully while trying his best to contain the story and characters from stretching the limits of exaggeration: "While he largely succeeds, he should be credited for elaborately examining the unexpressed emotions in relationships—and doing so amidst the cacophony of various other parallel tracks—without allowing either to shadow the other." He also praised the performances, particularly that of Joshi, whom he said "furnishes his character's state of mind immaculately". R. M. Vijayakar from India-West awarded the film 4 stars out of 5 and wrote that "with its subtle as well as biting satire", the film "grabs your emotional plexus and makes you love and cherish life and your loved ones all over again". Vijayakar praised Mapuskar's "masterly control of his script", and said that despite "the crackling undercurrent of humor", the film was a tearjerker and that "there will be lumps in the throat and tears in the eyes of those susceptible".

Hindustan Times writer Gulshankumar Wankar gave a rating of 3.5 stars out of 5, calling it "a delightful, well-written family drama" in which the director "successfully conveys his message about a father-son bond without going over the top" and "takes you inside the hospital and makes you sit with each character". Wankar also praised the performance of the cast, calling them "remarkable", and saying "Sukanya Kulkarni Mone and Jitendra Joshi play their characters of Gaju kaka’s children to perfection". A critic from the Indo-Asian News Service gave the film 3.5 stars and termed it a "heart warming saga" while writing, "we get another Marathi film of deep emotional worth, which challenges our long standing notions of the joint family system without the crutches of cynicism and self-loathing". Film critic Prachi Pinglay-Plumber of Outlook gave the film a rating of 3 out of 4, praising the open ending, and writing, "The premise lends itself beautifully to chaos, comedy and dollops of emotion ... you have a film that has all of the above boxes ticked".

== Accolades ==
Award	Date of ceremony (Note: Date is linked to the article about the awards held that year, wherever possible.)	Category	Recipient(s) and nominee(s)	Result	Ref.
Filmfare Marathi Awards	27 October 2017	Best Film	Priyanka Chopra	Nominated	
Filmfare Marathi Awards	27 October 2017	Best Director	Rajesh Mapuskar	Nominated	
Filmfare Marathi Awards	27 October 2017	Best Original Story	Rajesh Mapuskar	Won	
Filmfare Marathi Awards	27 October 2017	Best Screenplay	Rajesh Mapuskar	Won	
Filmfare Marathi Awards	27 October 2017	Best Dialogue	Rajesh Mapuskar	Nominated	
Filmfare Marathi Awards	27 October 2017	Best Debut Director	Rajesh Mapuskar	Won	
Filmfare Marathi Awards	27 October 2017	Best Actor	Jitendra Joshi	Nominated	
Filmfare Marathi Awards	27 October 2017	Best Supporting Actor	Ashutosh Gowariker	Nominated	
Filmfare Marathi Awards	27 October 2017	Best Supporting Actress	Sukanya Kulkarni-Mone	Nominated	
Filmfare Marathi Awards	27 October 2017	Best Music	Rohan-Rohan	Nominated	
Filmfare Marathi Awards	27 October 2017	Best Lyrics	Manoj Yadav (for song "Baba")	Nominated	
Filmfare Marathi Awards	27 October 2017	Best Production Design	Nikhil Kovale	Nominated	
Filmfare Marathi Awards	27 October 2017	Best Cinematography	Savita Singh	Nominated	
Filmfare Marathi Awards	27 October 2017	Best Editing	Rameshwar S. Bhagat	Won	
Filmfare Marathi Awards	27 October 2017	Best Background Score	Rohan-Rohan	Nominated	
Filmfare Marathi Awards	27 October 2017	Best Sound Design	Sanjay Maurya, Allwyn Rego	Won	
Lions Gold Awards	5 January 2017	Favourite Marathi Film	Priyanka Chopra	Won	
Maharashtra State Film Awards	30 April 2017	Best Film III	Priyanka Chopra	Won	
Mata Sanman Awards	28 March 2017	Best Film	Priyanka Chopra	Nominated	
Mata Sanman Awards	28 March 2017	Best Director	Rajesh Mapuskar	Nominated	
Mata Sanman Awards	28 March 2017	Best Supporting Actor	Jitendra Joshi	Won	
Mata Sanman Awards	28 March 2017	Best Music Direction	Rohan-Rohan	Nominated	
Mata Sanman Awards	28 March 2017	Best Lyrics	Manoj Yadav (for song "Baba")	Won	
Mata Sanman Awards	28 March 2017	Best Playback Singer Male	Rohan Pradhan (for song "Baba")	Won	
Mata Sanman Awards	28 March 2017	Best Screenplay	Rajesh Mapuskar	Won	
Mata Sanman Awards	28 March 2017	Best Editing	Rameshwar S. Bhagat	Won	
Mirchi Music Awards Marathi	2 March 2017	Listeners' Choice Song of the Year	Priyanka Chopra (for song "Baba")	Won	
Mirchi Music Awards Marathi	2 March 2017	Upcoming Music Composer of the Year	Rohan-Rohan	Nominated	
National Film Awards	3 May 2017	Best Director	Rajesh Mapuskar	Won	
National Film Awards	3 May 2017	Best Editing	Rameshwar S. Bhagat	Won	
National Film Awards	3 May 2017	Best Sound Mixing	Alok De	Won	
Pune International Film Festival	February 2017	Best Screenplay	Rajesh Mapuskar	Won	
Sanskruti Kaladarpan Awards	8 May 2017	Best Film	Priyanka Chopra	Won	
Sanskruti Kaladarpan Awards	8 May 2017	Best Director	Rajesh Mapuskar	Won	
Sanskruti Kaladarpan Awards	8 May 2017	Best Actor	Jitendra Joshi	Won	
Sanskruti Kaladarpan Awards	8 May 2017	Best Supporting Actor	Ashutosh Gowariker	Won	
Sanskruti Kaladarpan Awards	8 May 2017	Best Villain	Nilesh Diwekar	Won	
Sanskruti Kaladarpan Awards	8 May 2017	Best Screenplay	Rajesh Mapuskar	Won	
Sanskruti Kaladarpan Awards	8 May 2017	Best Editing	Rameshwar S. Bhagat	Won	
Zee Gaurav Puraskar	26 March 2017	Best Film	Priyanka Chopra	Nominated	
Zee Gaurav Puraskar	26 March 2017	Best Director	Rajesh Mapuskar	Nominated	
Zee Gaurav Puraskar	26 March 2017	Best Screenplay	Rajesh Mapuskar	Nominated	
Zee Gaurav Puraskar	26 March 2017	Best Editing	Rameshwar S. Bhagat	Nominated	
Zee Talkies Comedy Awards	30 July 2017	Best Film	Priyanka Chopra	Won	
Zee Talkies Comedy Awards	30 July 2017	Best Director	Rajesh Mapuskar	Won	

== Remake ==
Soon after the release and success of the film, Mapuskar said the producers had received several offers to remake Ventilator in other languages, including Bengali, Tamil, Punjabi and Gujarati. In August 2017, it was announced Ventilator will be remade in Malayalam with Chopra serving as a producer. The Gujarati remake Ventilator was released on 14 September 2018.

In early September 2017, it was announced it would be adapted into a Gujarati play directed by theatre actor Rajesh Joshi, with Mapuskar serving as a creative consultant.
