= Rajesh Mapuskar =

Indian film writer, director and producer

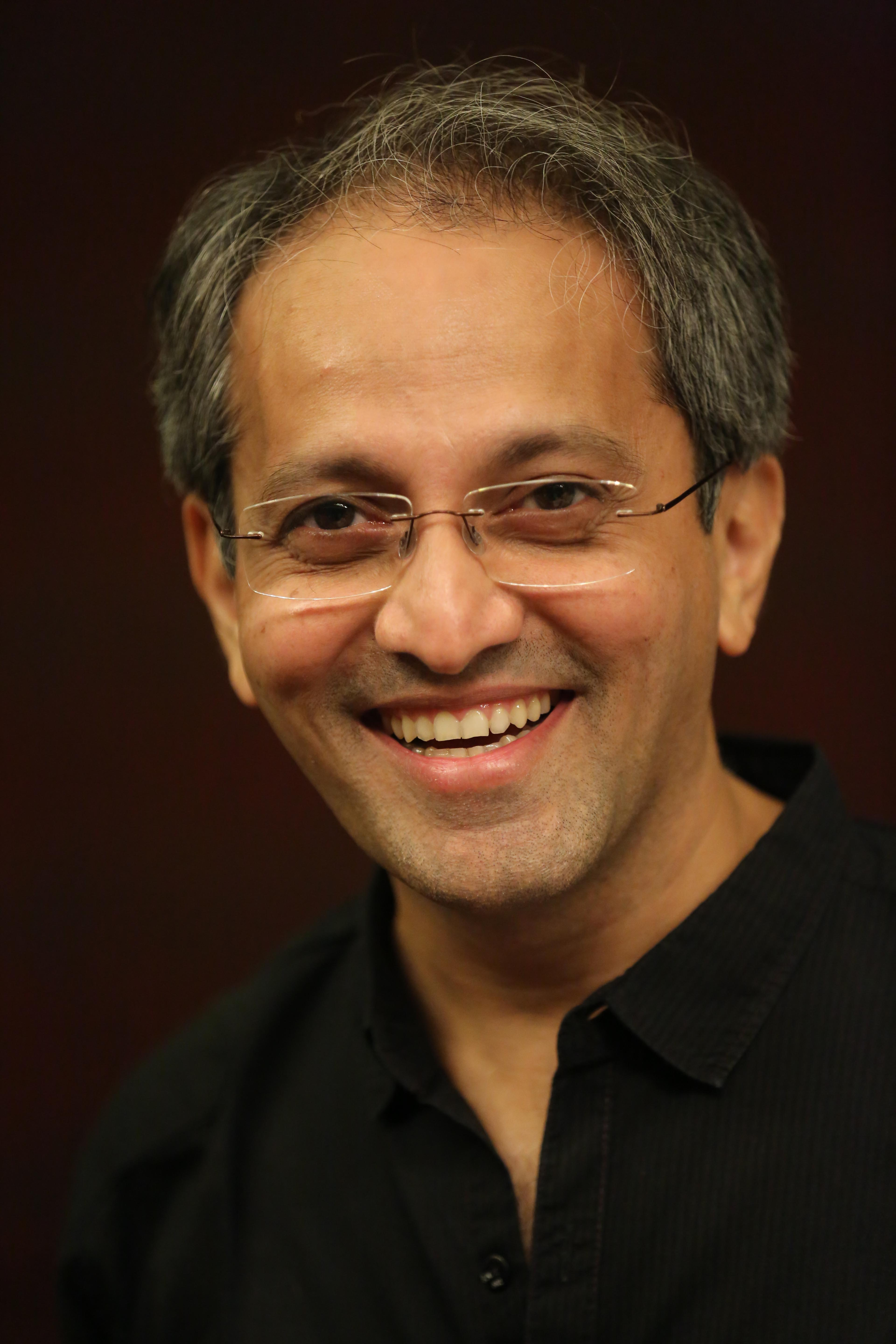
- Born: 26 September 1968 (age 58); Shrivardhan, Maharashtra, India
- Occupations: Director; Writer; Producer
- Years active: 1991–present
- Parent(s): Anant Mapuskar (father); Sindhu Mapuskar (mother)
- Relatives: Megha Barve (sister)

Rajesh Mapuskar is an Indian film writer, director and producer. He got involved in the world of films at a very young age, as his family owned a cinema hall. He made his writing and directional debut with Ferrari Ki Sawaari (2012). Later, he wrote and directed the acclaimed Marathi language film Ventilator (2016), which won him several accolades, including the National Film Award for Best Director.

== Early life and education ==
Rajesh Mapuskar was born on 26 September 1968 in Shrivardhan, a village in coastal Maharashtra. He was born into a joint family, to Anant Mahadev Mapuskar and Sindhu Anant Mapuskar. He studied at Shrivardhan High School till Grade 10 and then came to Mumbai and joined Kirti College, Dadar. He graduated with a Bachelor of Commerce degree.

He spent his childhood watching movies in the cinema hall his family owned. He got involved with taking care of it at a very young age - cleaning up, taking bookings and starting the film.

He also introduced his cousin Rohan Mapuskar to the film industry.

He has two sons Utsav and Zeal.

== Film career ==
Early career

Mapuskar was introduced to the media world in Mumbai by Dr. Satish Rajmachikar, a television producer-director. In 1991, he started working in production with veteran ad film maker Dilip Ghosh at Z Films. He worked there for 4 years, then left to start on his own, producing and line-producing ad films in India and abroad. It was at this time that he met and formed a friendship with Rajkumar Hirani.

Mapuskar started Collective Efforts Films, which soon became a top line producing company. His friend Bimal Oberoi joined him as partner in the company. Mapuskar started directing music videos for artistes like Sonu Nigam, Jagjit Singh and Mika. Collective Effort Films also handled photographer Prasad Naik's print campaigns and multiple ad films in India and abroad.

Feature Films

Just when Mapuskar was readying to relocate from Mumbai to Bangkok because of the constant stream of work from there, Rajkumar Hirani asked him to work as Chief Assistant Director on his directorial debut, Munnabhai MBBS. After Munnabhai MBBS, Mapuskar worked on Hirani's next two films Lage Raho Munnabhai and 3 Idiots, as Associate Director. All three films were produced by Vinod Chopra Films.

Under the same banner, Rajesh Mapuskar made his writing and directorial debut with Ferrari Ki Sawaari. The critically acclaimed ‘father-son-father’ film, starring Sharman Joshi and Boman Irani, was released on 15 June 2012.

Mapuskar's next film was Marathi language film Ventilator. Written and directed by him, the film was produced by Priyanka Chopra and Dr. Madhu Chopra, under their banner Purple Pebble Pictures. The dark comedy on family relationships released on 4 November 2016. It featured Jitendra Joshi and director-actor Ashutosh Gowariker, along with an ensemble cast of 116 actors, including Mapuskar's sons Utsav and Zeal. With Ventilator, Mapuskar also launched his own production house Magij Films.

He is currently working on his next Hindi film, a musical based in North East India. The film goes on the floor mid-2017.

Ad Films

Mapuskar has directed numerous ad films in India and abroad for production houses like Fingerprint Films and Rajkumar Hirani Films. He has worked with brands like Cadbury Drinking Chocolate, Vodacom, Milo, Cello Butterflow, Airtel, Serengeti Beer, Classmate Pens and Pan Emirates.

== Filmography ==
Year	Title	Director	Writer	Producer	Chief AD	Associate Director
2003	Munna Bhai MBBS			Yes		
2006	Lage Raho Munna Bhai					Yes
2009	3 idiots					Yes
2012	Ferrari ki Sawaari	Yes	Yes			
2016	Ventilator	Yes	Yes			
2022	Rudra: The Edge of Darkness	Yes	No			
2024	Yek Number	Yes	No			
2025	Real Kashmir Football Club	Yes	No			
2025	April May 99	No	No	Yes		

Actor

- Sau Jhooth Ek Sach (2005)

== Accolades ==
Award	Date of ceremony (Note: Date is linked to the article about the awards held that year, wherever possible.)	Category	Recipient(s) and nominee(s)	Result	Ref.
Filmfare Marathi Awards	27 October 2017	Best Film	Ventilator	Nominated	
Filmfare Marathi Awards	27 October 2017	Best Director	Rajesh Mapuskar	Nominated	
Filmfare Marathi Awards	27 October 2017	Best Actor	Jitendra Joshi	Nominated	
Filmfare Marathi Awards	27 October 2017	Best Supporting Actor	Ashutosh Gowariker	Nominated	
Filmfare Marathi Awards	27 October 2017	Best Supporting Actor	Sukanya Kulkarni Mone	Nominated	
Filmfare Marathi Awards	27 October 2017	Best Debut Director	Rajesh Mapuskar	Won	
Filmfare Marathi Awards	27 October 2017	Best Music	Rohan Gokhale, Rohan Pradhan	Nominated	
Filmfare Marathi Awards	27 October 2017	Best Lyrics	Manoj Yadav (for song "Baba")	Nominated	
Filmfare Marathi Awards	27 October 2017	Best Production Design	Nikhil Kovale	Nominated	
Filmfare Marathi Awards	27 October 2017	Best Cinematography	Savita Singh	Nominated	
Filmfare Marathi Awards	27 October 2017	Best Original Story	Rajesh Mapuskar	Won	
Filmfare Marathi Awards	27 October 2017	Best Screenplay	Rajesh Mapuskar	Won	
Filmfare Marathi Awards	27 October 2017	Best Dialogue	Rajesh Mapuskar	Nominated	
Filmfare Marathi Awards	27 October 2017	Best Editing	Rameshwar S. Bhagat	Won	
Filmfare Marathi Awards	27 October 2017	Best Background Score	Rohan Gokhale, Rohan Pradhan	Nominated	
Filmfare Marathi Awards	27 October 2017	Best Sound Design	Sanjay Maurya, Allwyn Rego	Won	
Lions Gold Awards	5 January 2017	Favourite Marathi Film	Ventilator	Won	
Maharashtra State Film Awards	30 April 2017	Best Film III	Ventilator	Won	
Mata Sanman Awards	28 March 2017	Best Film	Ventilator	Nominated	
Mata Sanman Awards	28 March 2017	Best Director	Rajesh Mapuskar	Nominated	
Mata Sanman Awards	28 March 2017	Best Supporting Actor	Jitendra Joshi	Won	
Mata Sanman Awards	28 March 2017	Best Music Direction	Rohan-Rohan	Nominated	
Mata Sanman Awards	28 March 2017	Best Lyrics	Manoj Yadav (for song "Baba")	Won	
Mata Sanman Awards	28 March 2017	Best Playback Singer Male	Rohan Pradhan (for song "Baba")	Won	
Mata Sanman Awards	28 March 2017	Best Screenplay	Rajesh Mapuskar	Won	
Mata Sanman Awards	28 March 2017	Best Editing	Rameshwar S. Bhagat	Won	
Mirchi Music Awards Marathi	2 March 2017	Listeners' Choice Song of the Year	Priyanka Chopra (for song "Baba")	Won	
Mirchi Music Awards Marathi	2 March 2017	Upcoming Music Composer of the Year	Rohan-Rohan	Nominated	
National Film Awards	3 May 2017	Best Director	Rajesh Mapuskar	Won	
National Film Awards	3 May 2017	Best Editing	Rameshwar S. Bhagat	Won	
National Film Awards	3 May 2017	Best Sound Mixing	Alok De	Won	
Pune International Film Festival	February 2017	Best Screenplay	Rajesh Mapuskar	Won	
Sanskruti Kaladarpan Awards	8 May 2017	Best Film	Ventilator	Won	
Sanskruti Kaladarpan Awards	8 May 2017	Best Director	Rajesh Mapuskar	Won	
Sanskruti Kaladarpan Awards	8 May 2017	Best Actor	Jitendra Joshi	Won	
Sanskruti Kaladarpan Awards	8 May 2017	Best Supporting Actor	Ashutosh Gowariker	Won	
Sanskruti Kaladarpan Awards	8 May 2017	Best Villain	Nilesh Diwekar	Won	
Sanskruti Kaladarpan Awards	8 May 2017	Best Screenplay	Rajesh Mapuskar	Won	
Sanskruti Kaladarpan Awards	8 May 2017	Best Editing	Rameshwar S. Bhagat	Won	
Zee Gaurav Puraskar	26 March 2017	Best Film	Ventilator	Nominated	
Zee Gaurav Puraskar	26 March 2017	Best Director	Rajesh Mapuskar	Nominated	
Zee Gaurav Puraskar	26 March 2017	Best Screenplay	Rajesh Mapuskar	Nominated	
Zee Gaurav Puraskar	26 March 2017	Best Editing	Rameshwar S. Bhagat	Nominated	
Zee Talkies Comedy Awards	30 July 2017	Best Film	Ventilator	Won	
Zee Talkies Comedy Awards	30 July 2017	Best Director	Rajesh Mapuskar	Won	
