= Aga Bai Arrecha! =

2004 film by Kedar Shinde

- VCD cover
- Directed by: Kedar Shinde
- Screenplay by: Mangesh Kulkarni; Kedar Shinde
- Based on: What Women Want
- Produced by: Jitendra Hariya
- Starring: Sanjay Narvekar; Dilip Prabhavalkar; Priyanka Yadav; Vijay Chavan; Tejaswini Pandit
- Cinematography: Rahul Jadhav
- Music by: Ajay–Atul
- Production company: Ark Productions
- Release date: 10 September 2004
- Country: India
- Language: Marathi
- Budget: ₹1.7 crore (US$180,000)
- Box office: ₹8−10 crore (US$−1.0 million)

Aga Bai Arrechha! (transl. She's Surprised, He's Surprised) is a 2004 Indian, Marathi-language comedy drama film by director Kedar Shinde, loosely based on the Hollywood film What Women Want. The film highlights the life and the problems of a common man living in a metropolitan city like Mumbai. His greatest desire in life is to answer the question "What do women want?" He is then blessed by the Kuldevi (Clan Goddess) of his village and gets a special "ear" for the internal dialogues of the women around him. It highlights his transition from a frustrated individual to someone who is happy, content and in charge of his life. The film also had a sequel titled Aga Bai Arechyaa 2, which was not a commercial success.

The songs from the film have become particularly popular. The film was remade in Kannada as Vaare Vah, starring Komal in 2010 and in Telugu as Lucky (2012).

== Plot ==
Shrirang “Ranga” Deshmukh (Sanjay Narvekar) is a mid-level executive at a travel firm in Mumbai, living in a large joint family with his wife Suman, his mother, estranged father (played by Dilip Prabhavalkar), grandmother, and sister. Ranga is constantly overwhelmed by life—caught between a domineering female boss (Shubhangi Gokhale), a nagging wife, and a household filled with emotional expectations. He feels trapped and suffocated, as if women control every aspect of his world. Everyday situations amplify his frustration: he’s scolded at work, mocked at home, and burdened with responsibilities. During a visit to his native village for the annual Jatra (fair), surrounded by devotional chants and rituals, Ranga mockingly prays, “If only I could understand what women want!” Unbeknownst to him, his plea is answered. On the return train journey to Mumbai, Ranga begins hearing the internal thoughts of every woman around him—conflicting with what they’re saying aloud. A chaotic stream of monologues begins flooding his mind, leaving him confused and disoriented. He initially assumes he’s just exhausted or hallucinating. Back in the city, things escalate: he reacts vocally to women's thoughts on the street and in the bus, making them feel awkward and exposed. At work, he accidentally responds to his female colleagues’ private thoughts, leaving them suspicious or alarmed. People around him, including his family, begin to treat him as unstable. This leads to one of the film’s funniest sequences, where Ranga mimics people’s thoughts, frightening them with seemingly psychic replies. Convinced he’s losing his mind, Ranga visits Dr. Suhas Phadke (Bharti Achrekar), a calm and thoughtful psychiatrist. After listening carefully, she reassures him, saying: “What if this isn’t madness, but a gift? You’re just not used to hearing what’s always been there.” She encourages him not to react impulsively to what he hears, but to use this ability to truly understand and empathize. At home, Ranga begins using his insight wisely: He supports Suman during family tensions. He comforts his mother, sensing her silent stress. He bonds genuinely with his grandmother. For the first time, he sees Suman not as just a wife, but as a woman silently carrying emotional and physical burdens. Instead of playing the “man of the house,” Ranga starts behaving like an equal partner. In a heartfelt gesture, he takes Suman to visit her mother—a reunion she had yearned for since their marriage. Ranga also reconnects with his silent, withdrawn father, who has barely spoken in years. Through his mother's unspoken thoughts (which Ranga can now hear), the tragic backstory unfolds: Years ago, his father, once a trade union leader at a textile mill, was expected to negotiate with mill owners during a strike. But when the moment came, he froze—unable to speak or defend the workers. Humiliated and broken, he withdrew into silence, feeling he had failed as a man and a leader. Ranga, now understanding the deep shame behind his father’s silence, approaches him with compassion. The emotional distance finally dissolves, and they share a moment of quiet reconciliation—a bond restored not by words, but by empathy. At the office, Ranga begins noticing the insecurities and hidden pain of his boss, a woman once seen as arrogant and bitter. Through the thoughts of others and subtle clues, he learns she is divorced, and had once dreamed of being a homemaker. But her partner's financial irresponsibility forced her into a tough professional role. Rather than judging her, Ranga begins treating her with subtle respect and understanding. He communicates with warmth and clarity, and over time, they make peace. His boss begins to see him as a capable and sensitive writer. He also builds a strong connection with a former colleague whom others in the office had sidelined—restoring dignity and inclusion. While visiting a government office, Ranga overhears the inner monologue of a woman planning a bombing. Using his ability, he quickly intervenes and prevents a potential terrorist attack, saving countless lives. At a press conference, when asked how he discovered the plan, he delivers a moving monologue about the depth, strength, and complexity of women’s minds—expressing gratitude for the supernatural experience that changed his life. Later, he even meets the would-be terrorist again, and after hearing her emotional backstory, tries to guide her toward redemption instead of hate. One year later, Ranga revisits the same Jatra where his journey began. This time, his divine power disappears. But instead of sadness, he feels peace. Though his wife is initially unhappy about the loss of the ability, Ranga reassures her that he’s learned the most important lesson that now he won't need supernatural powers to understand women—or anyone

== Cast ==
- Sanjay Narvekar as Shrirang Ganpat Deshmukh alias Ranga
- Priyanka Yadav as Suman Shrirang Deshmukh, Ranga's wife
- Dilip Prabhavalkar as Ganpat Deshmukh, Ranga's mute father
- Vimal Mhatre as Ranga's mother
- Rekha Kamat as Ranga's Grandmother
- Pallavi Vaidya as Meera; Ranga's sister
- Siddharth Jadhav as Ranga's Chawl Friend
- Shubhangi Gokhale as Mrs. Benare, Ranga's boss
- Suhas Joshi as Ranga's Mother-in-law
- Tejaswini Pandit as Aapa
- Bharati Achrekar as Dr. Suhas Phadke, Ranga's psychiatrist
- Rasika Joshi as taxi driver
- Vijay Chavan as the peon in Mantralaya
- Vinay Yedekar as Vishwas; Ranga's chawl friend
- Hrishikesh Joshi as Ranga's Colleague
- Guru Thakur as Ranga's Colleague
- Kshitee Jog as Ranga's Colleague
- Geetanjali Kulkarni as Ranga's Colleague
- Sandeep Pathak as Peon in Ranga Office
- Bharat Jadhav in Special Appearance
- Sonali Bendre in Special Appearance in an Item number "Cham Cham Karta Hai"

== Soundtrack ==
The soundtrack was produced by the musical duo of Ajay–Atul. The music of this movie almost breathes a new life to Marathi light music: The improvisation of the famous Durga Arti, the soul song "Mana Udhaan" and even the item number "Cham Cham karta", in which Sonali Bendre made a special appearance, which attracted much attention outside of Marathi film audience. The soundtrack was released by Sagarika Music.

=== Track listing ===
| No. | Title | Singer(s) | Length |
|---|---|---|---|
| 1. | "Durge Durgat Bhari" | Ajay Gogavale | 5:01 |
| 2. | "Prabhat" | Vijay Prakash, Ameya Datey, Yogita Godbole, Bela Sulakhe. | 6:06 |
| 3. | "Cham Cham Karta Hai" | Vaishali Samant | 4:23 |
| 4. | "Malharvari" | Shahir Sabale (Krishnarao Sable), Ajay Gogavale | 5:40 |
| 5. | "Mann Udhaan Varyache" | Shankar Mahadevan | 4:35 |
