= Baby Bring It On =

2016 Indian Marathi-language song by Ajay Gogavale

- Official song cover

Song by Ajay Gogavale

from the album Jaundya Na Balasaheb
- Language: Marathi
- Released: 27 September 2016
- Genre: Drum and bass
- Length: 4:18
- Label: Zee Music Company
- Songwriter: Ajay-Atul
- Composer: Ajay-Atul
- Producers: Saarrthi Entertainment; Arbhaat Films; Ajay-Atul Productions

Jaundya Na Balasaheb track listing
- 1. "Dolby Walya"; 2. "Gondhal"; 3. "Baby Bring It On"; 4. "Mona Darling"; 5. "Vaat Disu De"

Music video
- Baby Bring It On on YouTube

"Baby Bring It On" is a Marathi-language song from the soundtrack album of the 2016 comedy drama film Jaundya Na Balasaheb. The song was composed and written by Ajay-Atul, picturised on Bhau Kadam, and Sai Tamhankar, along with Girish Kulkarni, who also directed the film. It was remade in Hindi with the same title, for the 2024 movie Madgaon Express.

== Credits ==
- Ajay-Atul – composer, lyricist
- Ajay Gogavale – vocals
- Zee Music Company – label

== Critical reception ==
Vipin Nair of The Hindu observed the 'Bring It On' seems to be a sort of reprise to "Dolby Walya": the melody and percussion-laden arrangement are both similar. Manish Gaekwad of Scroll.in wrote "another manic hook-and-rhythm jamboree of folk and electronic beats." Saumitra Pote of Maharashtra Times opinied that the presence of this song in the movie makes the subject irrelevant.

== Hindi version ==
"Baby Bring It On"

Song by Ajay Gogavale and Nikhita Gandhi

from the album Madgaon Express
- Language: Hindi
- Released: 8 March 2024
- Genre: Soundtrack
- Label: Zee Music Company
- Songwriter: Kumaar
- Composer: Ajay-Atul
- Lyricist: Kumaar
- Producer: Ajay-Atul

Music video
- Baby Bring It On on YouTube

The song is remade in Bollywood with the same name, composed by Ajay-Atul for the 2024 film Madgaon Express, directed by Kunal Khemu. The song features Nora Fatehi, Divyenndu, Pratik Gandhi, Avinash Tiwary, Chhaya Kadam, Upendra Limaye. The song is sung by Ajay Gogavale and Nikhita Gandhi and lyrics are penned by Kumaar.

=== Credits ===
- Ajay-Atul – music composer, arranger, producer
- Ajay Gogavale –singer
- Nikhita Gandhi – singer
- Kumaar – lyricist (Hindi)
- Ajay-Atul – original lyrics (Marathi)
- Abhijit Vaghani – additional programmer
- Vijay Dayal – recording, mix & mastering at YRF Studios, Mumbai
- Savinay Shetty – music co-ordinator (Misfits Inc.)
- Nayantara Kumar – music co-ordinator (Misfits Inc.)
- Remo D'Souza – choreographer
- Ollwyn D'Souza – executive producer
- Karan B. Rawat – cinematographer
- Nitin FCP – editor
- R. D. Entertainment – line production company

=== Release ===
The song was officially released on 8 March 2024 on Zee Music Company YouTube channel. The actors Divyenndu, Avinash Tiwary, and Nora Fatehi had danced to the song in the Mumbai Metro.
