= Madgaon Express =

2024 Indian film by Kunal Khemu

- Theatrical release poster
- Directed by: Kunal Khemu
- Written by: Kunal Khemu
- Produced by: Farhan Akhtar; Ritesh Sidhwani
- Starring: Divyenndu; Pratik Gandhi; Avinash Tiwary; Nora Fatehi; Upendra Limaye; Chhaya Kadam
- Cinematography: Adil Afsar
- Edited by: Anand Subaya; Sanjay Shrirang Ingle
- Music by: Songs: Sharib-Toshi; Ankur Tewari; Kunal Khemu; Sagar Desai; Sameer Uddin; Ajay–Atul; Score: Sameer Uddin
- Production company: Excel Entertainment
- Distributed by: AA Films
- Release date: 22 March 2024
- Running time: 143 minutes
- Country: India
- Language: Hindi
- Box office: est. ₹57.34 crore

Madgaon Express is a 2024 Hindi-language crime comedy film written and directed by Kunal Khemu, in his directorial debut, and produced by Excel Entertainment. It stars an ensemble cast of Divyenndu, Pratik Gandhi, Avinash Tiwary, Nora Fatehi, Upendra Limaye and Chhaya Kadam.

Madgaon Express was theatrically released on 22 March 2024 to positive reviews from critics and grossed ₹57 crore worldwide. It received four nominations at 70th Filmfare Awards including Best Actor (Gandhi) and Best Debut Director (Khemu).

A spin-off film starring Khemu's cameo character Hardik titled Vibe released in theatres on 18 September 2026.

== Plot ==
1998, Mumbai: Dhanush "Dodo" Sawant, Pratik "Pinku" Garodia and Ayush Gupta, who have just passed 10th standard, dream of going to Goa after their board examinations. Due to their parents' reluctance, they are unable to do so. In 2003, the friends again plan the trip after their graduation, but meet with an accident as soon as they begin their journey. The plan is yet again put on the backburner.

A few years later, Pinku moves to Cape Town and Ayush to New York City. Pinku and Ayush have succeeded in life, earning well and leading comfortable lives. Meanwhile, Dodo is struggling to keep a steady job. He keeps in touch with Pinku and Ayush on social media. To catch up, Dodo starts faking a glamorous lifestyle on social media using editing software.

2015, Mumbai: Pinku and Ayush decide to fly down to Mumbai. They inform Dodo about it and also tell him that they will stay at his 'penthouse'. Dodo gets tense and suggests that, instead, they should fulfill their plan of visiting Goa. Pinku and Ayush agree. Unable to afford expensive flight tickets, Dodo books three tickets to Goa via train. Pinku and Ayush hate the idea, but agree on the condition that they will return by flight only. Before boarding the train, Pinku’s bag accidentally gets swapped with another man's. They discover that the bag contains cash, a gun and a key to a hotel room. They agree to get rid of the bag. Upon reaching their destination, they head straight to the beach. A drug dealer gives them psychedelic drug pills and after consuming it, they party together and spend the night with prostitutes at a hotel. Upon waking up the next morning, Ayush is upset at Dodo for bringing prostitutes with them as he did not want to cheat on his long-distance online girlfriend Nisha. Dodo confesses that he had secretly kept the hotel room key from the stranger's bag, along with the cash and had brought them to the same hotel room. This angers Ayush and Pinku and during an altercation, Pinku falls down hard on top of the bed and they discover a stash of cocaine hidden underneath it. Later, Kanchan Kombdi, a lady gangster, arrives with her gang and mistakens Ayush for Ganpat, whose bag got exchanged with Pinku's.

Kanchan Kombdi asks him to meet her at her place and her gang surrounds the entire hotel premises. The three escape the place by jumping off the window. Pinku begins to act strangely due to overdosing on cocaine. They start looking for a doctor to help Pinku. They meet a young woman Tasha, who takes them to Dr. Danny. He gives Pinku an injection which heals him. It is revealed that the cocaine found at the hotel room belongs to Mendoza Bhai, a ruthless gangster. Upon returning to the hotel, the three are shocked to discover that the cocaine is missing. The police arrive and they escape the place. Meanwhile, Ganpat reaches the hotel and is angry to find the cocaine missing, which he had hidden underneath the bed. He discovers Pinku's cellphone inside his bag and sees text messages from his girlfriend Mariam.

Ayush and Pinku blame Dodo for their predicament and say they no longer trust him. Dodo admits his social-media persona was all an act because he felt like a “nobody” and didn’t want to embarrass them. Hearing this, they reassure him that he’ll always be their friend and forgive him. It is revealed that Mendoza Bhai and Kanchan Kombdi used to love each other and were married, but Mendoza Bhai fell in love with and married another woman, which angered Kanchan Kombdi, leading to her embarking on a journey of vengeance. Kanchan Kombdi had found the cocaine in the hotel room and had stolen it, planning to sell it and earn money, to get even with Mendoza Bhai. Ganapath is revealed to be a member of Mendoza Bhai's gang, but is secretly working with Kanchan Kombdi.

The three decide to leave Goa, but discover that the police are looking for them and posters, with their sketches, are stuck everywhere. Dodo receives a phone call from Tasha, who asks them to meet her if they want to leave safely. Upon reaching, they discover that Tasha is held hostage by Mendoza Bhai and it was a setup to bring them to him. Mendoza Bhai orders Dodo and Pinku to go to Kanchan Kombdi's place to retrieve the cocaine, disguised as women, to blend in with her gang members. Mendoza Bhai adds that Ayush and Tasha would remain with him and that he would kill them if they cannot retrieve the cocaine.

Dodo and Pinku reach Kanchan Kombdi's place and begin to look for the cocaine. One of the gang members finds out Pinku's identity, which leads to an altercation in which Pinku's finger is chopped. The place is raided by Dr. Danny, who is actually an undercover cop, along with his team, and a massive shootout ensues. Dodo and Pinku manage to escape the place with the cocaine. Ayush and Tasha also escape while Mendoza Bhai and his gang are asleep. Tasha develops a liking towards Ayush. The four are united and plan to finally leave the place, but Pinku receives a call from Ganpat, saying that he has taken Mariam hostage and demands that they return his money and the cocaine. They decide to meet Ganpat on board the Madgaon Express and return the goods to him. The next day, they board the train and Ganpat arrives there with Mariam.

However, Mendoza Bhai and Kanchan Kombdi also arrive and demands to return the cocaine. They return the bag to them, but the cocaine is not there inside the bag. It is revealed that with the help of Danny, they had informed the police about everything and had handed over the cocaine to them. The police arrive and arrest Mendoza Bhai, Kanchan Kombdi and Ganpat, while the three along with Mariam finally leave Goa. Before Ayush boards his flight back to New York, Dodo confesses that his online girlfriend Nisha is actually Dodo, who chatted with him online pretending to be a girl, as a practical joke. This upsets Ayush, though he gives Dodo a hug before leaving, seemingly forgiving him.

A year later, Pinku introduces Mariam to his mother and they plan to get married. Dodo wins the lottery and becomes rich. Ayush removes "Nisha" as a friend from his social media account and receives a friend request from Tasha. Dodo, now rich, reaches Ayush's house and says that they should go to Las Vegas together.

== Cast ==
- Divyenndu as Dhanush "Dodo" Sawant
  - Aryan Prajapati as young Dodo
- Pratik Gandhi as Pratik "Pinku/Pinkya" Garodia
  - Jewel Narigara as Young Pinku
- Avinash Tiwary as Ayush Gupta
- Nora Fatehi as Tasha
- Upendra Limaye as Mendoza Bhai
- Chhaya Kadam as Kanchan Kombdi
- Remo D'Souza as Dr. Danny (Special appearance)
- Raviraj Kande as Ganpat
- Sameer Patil as Dodo’s father
- Vipul Deshpande as Inspector Girish Dhodankar
- Umesh Jagtap as Constable Santosh Sathe

Additionally, writer and director Kunal Khemu makes a cameo appearance as a drug peddler Hardik.

== Production ==
Principal photography commenced in August 2022 and wrapped in February 2023.

== Music ==
Madgaon Express

Soundtrack album by Sharib-Toshi Ankur Tewari, Kunal Khemu, Sagar Desai, Sameer Uddin and Ajay–Atul
- Released: 13 March 2024
- Recorded: 2022
- Genre: Feature film soundtrack
- Length: 20:20
- Language: Hindi
- Label: Zee Music Company

Official audio
- Madgaon Express - Full Album on YouTube

The music of the film is composed by Sharib-Toshi, Ankur Tewari, Kunal Khemu, Sagar Desai, Sameer Uddin and Ajay–Atul. Lyrics are written by Kumaar, Kalim Sheikh and Kunal Khemu.

The song Baby Bring It On is a remake of same title song which was composed by Ajay–Atul for the 2016 Marathi film Jaundya Na Balasaheb.

Track listing
| No. | Title | Lyrics | Music | Singer(s) | Length |
|---|---|---|---|---|---|
| 1. | "Baby Bring It On" | Kumaar | Ajay–Atul | Ajay Gogavale, Nikhita Gandhi | 3:36 |
| 2. | "Raaton Ke Nazaare" | Kalim Sheikh | Sharib-Toshi | Sharib-Toshi, Benny Dayal | 3:33 |
| 3. | "Not Funny" | Kalim Sheikh | Sharib-Toshi | Shaarib, Akasa Singh | 2:42 |
| 4. | "Hum Yahin" | Kunal Khemu | Ankur Tewari, Kunal Khemu | Kunal Khemu, Nathan D’Souza | 3:21 |
| 5. | "Bohot Bhaari" | Kunal Khemu, D'Evil | Sharib-Toshi | Toshi Sabri, D'Evil | 2:24 |
| 6. | "Who’s Your Mommy" | Sameer Uddin, Abhishek Nailwal, Srushti Tawade | Sameer Uddin | Srushti Tawade, Sameer Uddin, Nora Fatehi | 2:18 |
| 7. | "Mamo Chitte" | Sagar Desai | Sagar Desai | Sagar Desai | 2:26 |
| Total length: | | | | | 20:20 |

== Release ==
=== Theatrical ===
The film was theatrically released on 22 March 2024.

=== Home media ===
The film was premiered on Amazon Prime Video from 17 May 2024.

== Reception ==
=== Critical response ===
Madgaon Express received positive reviews from critics. On the review aggregator website Rotten Tomatoes, 73% of 11 critics' reviews are positive, with an average rating of 6.2/10.

Mayur Sanap of Rediff.com rated 3/5 stars and applauded "Madgaon Express understands that its charm lies in its inherent silliness and then works around as pure unadulterated entertainment, which makes it imminently watchable". NDTV's Saibal Chatterjee rated the film 3/5 and wrote "Madgaon Express is a wild and wacky comedy of errors that rarely, if ever, pauses for a breather. The film is deliriously funny as it moves effortlessly and incessantly between slapstick and sparkling silver-tongued wit."

Conversely, Shubhra Gupta of The Indian Express gave 1.5 stars out of 5 and stated that "too many of the jokes end in a clunk. A song line about not having fun attempts to spice up a scene when the bad guys are sleeping and the good men are trying to get away. That may have served as a summary of the entire movie".

== Accolades ==
| Year | Award | Category | Nominee/Work | Result | Ref. |
|---|---|---|---|---|---|
| 2025 | 70th Filmfare Awards | Best Debut Director | Kunal Khemu | Won | |
| 2025 | 70th Filmfare Awards | Best Screenplay | Kunal Khemu | Nominated | |
| 2025 | 70th Filmfare Awards | Best Dialogue | Kunal Khemu | Nominated | |
| 2025 | 70th Filmfare Awards | Best Actor (Critics) | Pratik Gandhi | Nominated | |
