= Mauli (film) =

2018 Indian film by Aditya Sarpotdar

- Theatrical release poster
- Directed by: Aditya Sarpotdar
- Written by: Kshitij Patwardhan
- Produced by: Genelia D'Souza
- Starring: Riteish Deshmukh; Saiyami Kher
- Cinematography: Amalendu Chaudhary
- Edited by: Sanjay Sankla
- Music by: Background Score: Troy-Arif; Songs: Ajay–Atul
- Production companies: Mumbai Film Company; Hindustan Talkies
- Distributed by: AA Films; Jio Studios
- Release date: 14 December 2018
- Running time: 136 minutes
- Country: India
- Language: Marathi

Mauli is a 2018 Indian Marathi-language action drama film directed by Aditya Sarpotdar and produced by Genelia D'Souza. The film stars Riteish Deshmukh in the title role along with Saiyami Kher. Though the film is not a sequel, it carries a premise and various plot elements similar to the 2014 film Lai Bhaari. The film was initially supposed to be released on 21 December 2018 but it was changed to 14 December to avoid clashing with the Shah Rukh Khan starrer Zero. The film was released on 14 December 2018. Upon release, Mauli received mixed reviews from critics, with praise for the cinematography, performance of Deshmukh, soundtrack, action sequences, and narration, but criticism for its writing and pace.

== Plot ==
Mauli (Riteish Deshmukh) and Mauli, are twin brothers who share a name. Mauli is brave, while Inspector Mauli is the complete opposite. But their life changes when Inspector Mauli gets transferred to a village where there are no laws, and the whole village is afraid of Nana (Jitendra Joshi), a powerful goon who closed down the temple of God Mauli.

After he gets transferred, he falls in love with Renuka (Saiyami Kher), who mistakenly thinks that he is a brave officer. When Inspector Mauli gets beaten, his furious brother, Mauli, fights back and gives all the credit to his brother, making him a brave officer in front of the village. However, nobody can come to the understanding that they are twin brothers.

When Mauli becomes an obstacle for Nana, he kills him, through which, everybody in the village finds out the truth. Inspector Mauli becomes weak without his brother but decides to kill the evil Nana to save the village and take his revenge.

== Cast ==
- Riteish Deshmukh as Inspector Mauli Sarjerao Deshmukh / Mauli Sarjerao Deshmukh (double role)
- Saiyami Kher as Renuka
- Jitendra Joshi as Nana Londhe aka Dharamaraj
- Vijay Nikam as Bhanudas Tupe
- Girija Oak as Mauli's mother
- Siddharth Jadhav as Kadaknath
- Genelia Deshmukh as herself in the song "Dhuvun Taak" (cameo appearance)
- Usha Naik as Shantai
- Umesh Jagtap as Dharma Pawar
- Chinmay Mandlekar as Preacher
- Mayur Khandge as Uttam
- Vitthal Patil as Dinu
- Shrikant Yadav as Bhairavnath
- Prashant Tapasvi as Constable Salunkhe
- Gaurav More as Baloon shop owner
- Mahesh Jadhav as Tailor Assistant
- Sandy as Nana's Henchmen

== Soundtrack ==
Mauli

Soundtrack album by Ajay–Atul
- Released: 18 December 2018
- Recorded: 2018
- Genre: Soundtrack
- Length: 21:53
- Label: Mumbai Film Company

The music was composed by Ajay–Atul and released under the Mumbai Film Company. Background score was done by Troy-Arif.

No.	Title	Singer(s)	Length
1.	"Bindhast Houn"	Karthik, Shreya Ghoshal	4:35
2.	"Magu Kuna Haat Ra"	Ajay Gogavale	4:43
3.	"Dhuvun Taak"	Ajay Gogavale	3:34
4.	"Mazi Pandhari Chi Maa"	Ajay Gogavale	7:37
5.	"Mauli - Teaser"		1:24
Total length:			21:53
