= Jaundya Na Balasaheb =

- Theatrical release poster
- Directed by: Girish Kulkarni
- Screenplay by: Girish Kulkarni
- Produced by: Ajay–Atul; Poonam Shende; Umesh Vinayak Kulkarni
- Starring: Girish Kulkarni; Bhalchandra Kadam; Sai Tamhankar; Manava Naik; Mohan Joshi; Reema Lagoo; Shrikant Yadav; Savita Prabhune
- Music by: Ajay–Atul
- Production companies: Zee Studios; Saarrthi Entertainment; Arbhaat Films; Ajay-Atul Productions; Saaga Films
- Distributed by: Zee Studios
- Release date: 7 October 2016
- Running time: 165 minutes
- Country: India
- Language: Marathi

Jaaundya na Balasaheb (transl. Leave it Balasaheb) is a 2016 Indian Marathi-language comedy drama film written and directed by Girish Kulkarni in his directorial debut. The filming began in Pune and its surroundings, in February–March of the 2015. The music is composed by Ajay–Atul who also co-producer of the film. The song "Dolby Walya" featured in Animal as a background score and "Baby Bring It On" is remade for the soundtrack album of Madgaon Express.

== Plot ==
Balasaheb is son of a rich influential politician of his village Annasaheb. The word saheb means sir and everyone, including his parents, addresses him by that name, as he is heir to their political heritage. Karishma is a childhood friend of Balasaheb and has a crush on him, but he is unaware of that. He gets nightmares of his marriage which was broken right before they took vows because of a power tussle between Annasaheb's and bride's father. He consults a few doctors, but they tell him that he is perfectly normal.

On returning from Pune city after consulting a doctor, they visit a theatre academy because his friend is fond of theatre and wants to check for any courses there. They find that there is a play in session and decides to attend it. The play is on social stigma associated with lesbian love written and directed by Urmi. After the play Urmi explains her views & inspiration behind the play & Balasaheb is smitten by her.

His father aspire that he would continue his lineage by becoming candidate for his party in the next election, but Balasaheb seems to have lost purpose in his life after his broken marriage. His mother is very fond of him & tries to provide him emotional support. He spends time drinking, women & he keeps on drifting aimlessly. However, after the watching the play he feels that he has found some purpose.

Later he has an argument with father & Balasaheb berates him of his corrupt practices & how his lust of power resulted in his broken marriage. His father challenges him to get just two followers on his own without money or his influence and only then would he come to terms with harsh realities of power and money.

He tries calling all his friends & he realises that everyone is avoiding him except 2 of his close friends Jeevan & Vicky. He gives a stash of cash to Jeevan to pursue the course at the theatre academy. All three of them attend the course and post session they have a casual chat with the Urmi who is one of the instructors at the course. She bluntly questions Balasaheb what has he has achieved in life to deserve the title of sir. Balasaheb doesn't have any answer & is embarrassed. She then takes a promise from him that he would use his political clout to help his friend become a scriptwriter (in turn giving voice to free speech). He resolves to fulfill the promise & when he returns to his village he assembles his friends for the play written by Jeevan which they would present in a competition.

Balasaheb again has argument with Annasaheb who wants him to wrap up his play & focus on forthcoming elections. Balasaheb enraged leaves his home, but his mother keeps in touch with his friends to keep a tab on his well-being. As the cast starts practising it seems that none of them have any talent for acting. Balasaheb plays a character of poet, however his pitch & actions are that of rich landlord. Here Annasaheb puts making hurdles in his play to get him ready for forthcoming elections, but Balasaheb remains firm on his resolve & overcomes each of them. He receives support from his mother, later from each member of the play & finally from his entire village. With emotional turmoil and unable to get his pitch of that of a helpless commoner it takes a toll on his emotional state.

Later the when the play is staged at the competition, everything goes well till the entry of Balasaheb. When he enters he is unable to enact his role & breaks down in front of the audience. He then narrates to them how his team assembled the play despite their tough living conditions. He now finds the true purpose of his life & later decides to fight elections independently to serve the people in true spirit.

== Cast ==
- Girish Kulkarni as Balasaheb Marne
- Bhalchandra Kadam as Zatkya
- Sai Tamhankar as Karishma
- Manava Naik as Urmi
- Mohan Joshi as Annasaheb
- Reema Lagoo as Aaisaheb
- Dilip Prabhavalkar as Sarpanch
- Satish Alekar as Professor
- Nandkishor Choughule as Jeevan
- Swapnil Kuthe as a guy in crowd

== Release ==
Jaundya Na Balasaheb was theatrically released in India on 7 October 2016.

== Soundtrack ==
Jaundya Na Balasaheb

Soundtrack album by Ajay–Atul
- Released: 17 September 2016
- Genre: Feature film soundtrack
- Length: 25:49
- Language: Marathi
- Label: Zee Music Company

Ajay–Atul chronology
| Sairat (2016) | Jaundya Na Balasaheb (2016) |

The songs and background score for the film are composed by composer duo Ajay–Atul, who gave a blockbuster performance in their earlier film Sairat (2016). The track "Dolby Walya" was later reused as a background score in Bollywood-film Animal (2023).

| No. | Title | Lyrics | Singer(s) | Length |
|---|---|---|---|---|
| 1. | "Dolby Walya" | Ajay–Atul | Nagesh Morwekar & Rap : Earl Edgar(Rapper) | 05:07 |
| 2. | "Gondhal" | Ajay–Atul/Rooh | Ajay Gogavale | 05:00 |
| 3. | "Baby Bring It On" | Ajay–Atul | Ajay Gogavale | 04:18 |
| 4. | "Mona Darling" | Vaibhav Joshi | Suman Sridhar, Shreya Ghoshal, Sonu Nigam & Kunal Ganjawala | 04:53 |
| 5. | "Vaat Disu De" | Rooh | Ajay Gogavale & Yogita Godbole | 05:42 |
| Total length: | | | | 25:49 |
