= Yek Number (film) =

- Theatrical release poster
- Directed by: Rajesh Mapuskar
- Written by: Story and screenplay: Tejaswini Pandit; Dhairya Gholap; Arvind Jagtap; Vinayak Purushottam; Mayuresh Joshi; Dialogues: Arvind Jagtap; Vinayak Purushottam
- Produced by: Tejaswini Pandit; Warda Nadiadwala
- Starring: Dhairya Gholap; Sayli Patil
- Cinematography: Sanjay Memane
- Edited by: Mayur Hardas; Apurva Motiwale
- Music by: Ajay-Atul; Kunal-Karan
- Production companies: Zee Studios; Nadiadwala Grandson Entertainment; Sahyadri Films
- Release date: 10 October 2024
- Running time: 160 minutes
- Country: India
- Language: Marathi

Yek Number is a Marathi-language drama film directed by Rajesh Mapuskar, starring Dhairya Gholap and Sayli Patil in the lead roles. It is produced by Tejaswini Pandit and Warda Nadiadwala under the banners of Zee Studios, Nadiadwala Grandson Entertainment, and Sahyadri Films.

== Cast ==
- Dhairya Gholap as Pratap
- Sayli Patil as Pinky
- Rajesh Khera as Afiz Hamid
- Malaika Arora Special appearance in song "Majha Yek Number"

== Production ==
Tejaswini Pandit made her debut as a film producer, while politician Raj Thackeray also ventured into film production, collaborating with Nadiadwala Grandson on the project. On International Women's Day 2024, Tejaswini Pandit and Warda Nadiadwala announced the film. The film was shot in various locations across Maharashtra, including Wai, Junnar, Mumbai, and Konkan.

== Marketing ==
The film look poster unveiled on 18 August 2024. The teaser was released on YouTube on 13 September, followed by the trailer launch on 25 September. The trailer launch event was attended by the film's creators and various directors and stars from the industry. Aamir Khan was present alongside fellow filmmakers Rajkumar Hirani, Ashutosh Gowariker, and Sajid Nadiadwala, as well as the film's producer, politician Raj Thackeray.

== Release ==
The film was theatrically released on 10 October 2024 in Maharashtra, coinciding Dasara.

== Soundtrack ==
Track listing
No.	Title	Lyrics	Music	Singer(s)	Length
1.	"Majha Yek Number - Title Track"	Ajay-Atul	Ajay-Atul	Jonita Gandhi	4:14
2.	"Jahir Jhalay Jagala"	Guru Thakur	Ajay-Atul	Ajay Gogavale; Shreya Ghoshal	5:14
3.	"Tu Abhaal"	Kunal-Karan	Kunal-Karan	Javed Ali; Ravindra Khomne	7:56
4.	"Toll Naka"	Vinayak Purushottam	Kunal-karan	Kunal-karan	2:41
Total length:					20:05

== Reception ==
Jaydeep Pathakji of The Times of India rated 3/5 stars praised the film's interesting premise and its blend of rural and urban elements. However, he feel that the first half lacks momentum. Payal Naik of Sakal rated 3/5 stars and finds Yek Number interesting but notes that the first half is slow, with the film gaining momentum in the second half through engaging twists.
