= Ajay-Atul =

Indian play-back singers and composers

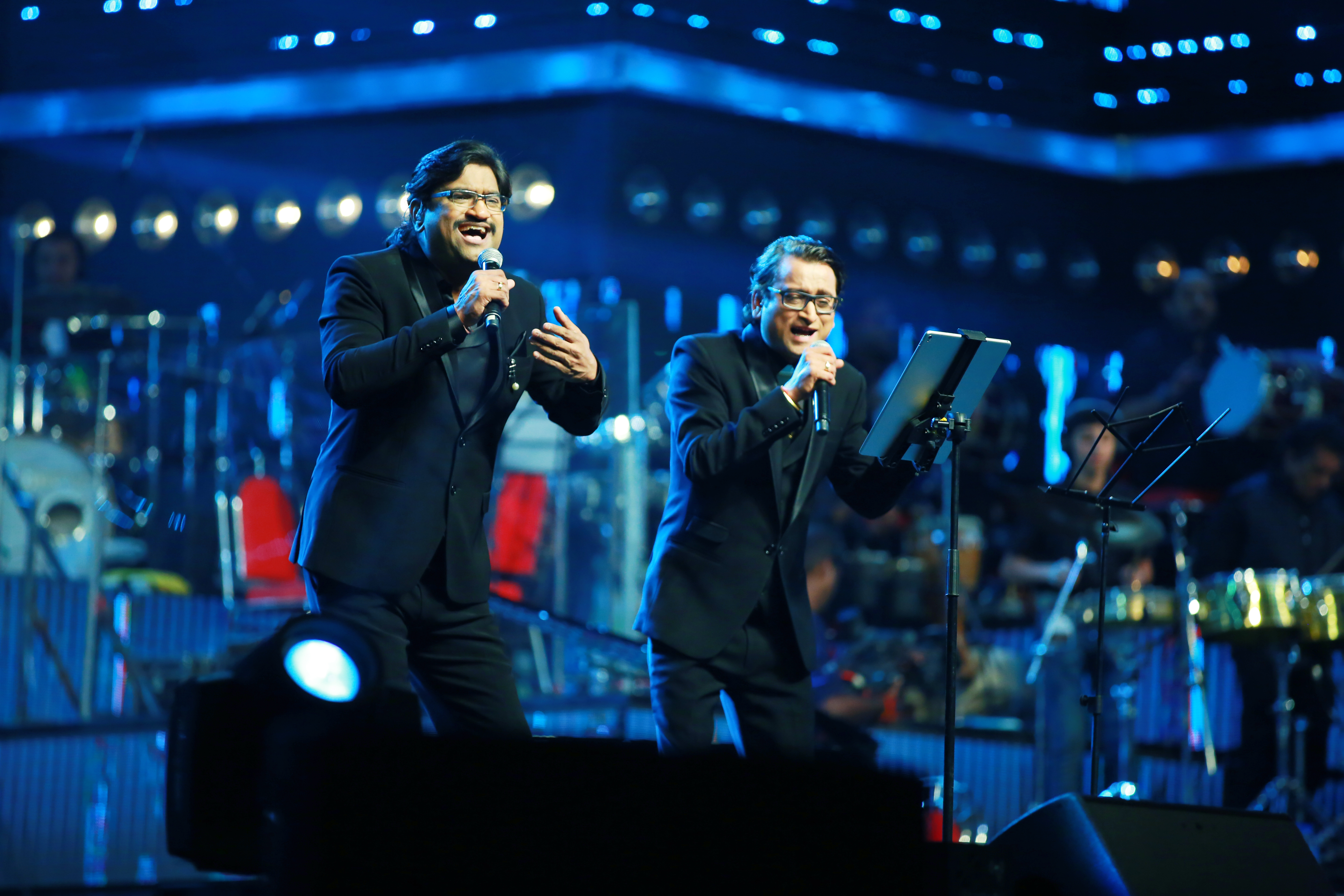
- Ajay (left)-Atul (right) in Pune
- Born: 21 August 1976 (age 50) (Ajay); 11 September 1974 (age 52) (Atul); Pune, Maharashtra, India
- Occupations: Record producer; composer; playback singer; songwriter
- Years active: 2000–present
- Organization(s): A&A Music Studios
- Works: Discography

Ajay-Atul
- Genres: Indian folk music; filmi; classical; semi-classical; folk; orchestral
- Instruments: Vocals; keyboards; piano; harmonium; percussions; drums; guitar; accordion; harp; synthesizer; dholki

Ajay-Atul is an Indian music composer duo comprising brothers Ajay Ashok Gogavale and Atul Ashok Gogavale. Known for their works in Indian cinema; predominantly in Marathi and Hindi films. They are recipient of a National Film Award, four Filmfare Awards Marathi, three Maharashtra State Film Awards, twelve Mirchi Music Awards, and two Zee Cine Awards. They made their debut in the 2015 Forbes India Celebrity 100 List securing a position of 82 and were placed 22nd in 2019.

They began their career with the devotional album Vishwa Vinayak, which combined traditional Ganpati mantras with symphonic music. Over the years, they have worked on notable films such as Natarang, Sairat, Agneepath, Dhadak, and Tumbbad. Their compositions often feature live instruments and draw from a mix of traditional and contemporary styles. In recent years, their work in Marathi films like Chandramukhi and Ved has received critical recognition and awards. They remain active in the music industry, consistently exploring new projects.

== Early life ==
Ajay and Atul were born to Ashok Gogavale, a Revenue Department officer of Alandi, Pune. They spent their childhood in several villages of western Maharashtra, such as Rajgurunagar, Junnar, Shirur, Manchar and Ghodegaon as their father had a transferable job. Atul, the elder of the brothers, was born on 11 September 1974 and Ajay, the younger of the brothers, was born on 21 August 1976.

Throughout their childhood, they were not much interested in academics. But their interest in music developed while they were still in school. Around this time, they started experimenting with music. In an NCC competition, Ajay played an existing composition differently, and they won the prize for their experiment.

They did not have a musical background. Although they were not supported by their family directly for music, they were never denied any assistance. As their family could not afford the instruments for their musical endeavors, they started their musical ventures through their school, temples, local bands, etc. Despite not getting direct training, they learned a lot from these ventures. They would befriend people who owned instruments like harmoniums, mridangam, dhol, etc., since they could not afford them on their own. Later, while at college, they started working with local bands as arrangers. Their father bought them a keyboard on their mother's insistence. This proved to be one of their greatest gifts. Their father said, "You have not been given any toys during childhood, now this is your toy". This inspired them and they started experimenting.

== Career as music composers ==
In the early days of their career, They created a devotional album called Vishwa Vinayak. At that time, devotional music was heavily influenced by film tunes and repetitive loops, which they felt affected its sanctity. Inspired by their devotion to Lord Ganesh, they decided to compose the album by blending traditional aartis and mantras with symphonic music, drawing inspiration from Western composers like Bach and Beethoven, even though they had little knowledge of symphonies. They spent about a year and a half researching and working on the album to ensure the religious chants were accurate and respectful. Despite their excitement about the project, Vishwa Vinayak did not bring them instant success. For the next two and a half years, they struggled to find opportunities in music. During this period they also worked one devotional music -" Teri Sharan" a Christian devotional album by singer Dhiraj James Thapa, recorded in MOM studio by the finest sound engineer Peter Gaikward, which went on to become a hit. Looking back, they saw this phase as a time of learning and preparation for bigger achievements.

However, their fortunes changed when they received a call from a music enthusiast in Baroda, who praised the album and went out of his way to contact them. This marked the beginning of growing recognition for Vishwa Vinayak, as they started receiving appreciation from listeners worldwide.

Gradually, their work in Vishwa Vinayak caught the attention of filmmakers. Ram Gopal Varma approached them for the film Gayab, while Mahesh Manjrekar and Amitabh Bachchan collaborated with them on Viruddh. Their success in Marathi cinema also began during this time, with projects like Savarkhed Ek Gaon, Aga Bai Arrecha! and Jatra. They credit Vishwa Vinayak as the breakthrough that brought them widespread recognition and launched their successful career in music composition. They worked on many commercial jingles, ballets, and advertisements to strengthen their profile.

Man Udhān Vāryāche (मन उधाण वाऱ्याचे), Malhāravārī (मल्हारवारी), Kombdī Paḷalī (कोंबडी पळाली ) are some of their notable compositions. Ajay-Atul composed the songs and background score for the Marathi film Naṭarang (नटरंग) (2010). Their composition for Naṭarang was influenced by traditional Marathi folk music forms like Lavani (लावणी), Phaṭakā (फटका) and Tamāśā (तमाशा). They composed music for the Hindi films Singham & Bol Bachchan starring Ajay Devgan directed by Rohit Shetty and Agneepath & Brothers produced by Karan Johar directed by Karan Malhotra. They have also contributed music to the Aamir Khan starrer PK. In 2016, they worked in Nagraj Manjule's film Sairat which is the only Marathi film to gross over 1 billion. They also composed for Manasu Mallige, the film's Kannada remake and Dhadak, the Hindi remake. They produced the Marathi film Jaundya Na Balasaheb directed by Girish Kulkarni. They composed for Tumbbad, Thugs of Hindostan, Mauli and Zero. Their first song from Zero, "Mere Naam Tu", garnered 18 million views in 24 hours on YouTube.

They were awarded as 'Composer of the Decade' in Mirchi Music Awards (Hindi) 2021 for Agneepath and Mirchi Music Awards (Marathi) 2021 for Sairat.

Almost all of their songs and albums are recorded using live instruments, the most notable of them being Agneepath, Sairat and Dhadak.

They continued to compose music for several Hindi and Marathi films. In Bollywood, they worked on Super 30, Panipat, Tanhaji (one song), Jhund (one song) and Ram Setu (one song). In 2022, they delivered chartbuster songs for the Marathi films Chandramukhi and Ved. Their work in Chandramukhi earned them multiple awards, including the Filmfare Marathi Award for Best Music Director, Maharashtracha Favourite Kon, Zee Chitra Gaurav Puraskar, and Fakt Marathi Cine Sanman. Songs like "Sukh Kalale" and "Ved Lavlay" from Ved also became highly popular.

In 2023, they composed songs for Jaggu Ani Juliet, but the music did not gain much attention. However, their work in Maharashtra Shahir brought them success again, with the song "Baharla Ha Madhumas" becoming a hit and earning a Filmfare Marathi Award for Best Music Director. Later that year, their composition "Jai Shri Ram" from the film Adipurush was widely praised for its unique style.

In 2024, the song Baby Bring It On from the film Madgaon Express was released but received negative reviews as it was a remake. Currently, They are working on a song for the upcoming film Yek Number.

== Awards and recognition ==
Year	Award	Award Category	Award Details
2003	Alpha Gaurav (Later Zee Gaurav)	Best Music Direction	Play: Sahi Re Sahi
2004–05	Maharashtra Kala Niketan Award	Best Music Direction	Film: Savarkhed Ek Gaon
2004–05	Maharashtra Times Sanman	Best Music Direction	Film: Savarkhed Ek Gaon
2004–05	Maharashtra Rajya Natya Vyavsayik Spardha	Best Music Direction	Play: Lochya Zala Re
2004–05	Sanskruti Kala Darpan	Best Music Direction	Film: Aga Bai Arrecha
2007	Maharashtra Rajya Natya Vyavsayik Spardha	Best Music Direction	Play: Kala Ya Laglya Jiva
2008	Maharashtra Times Sanman	Best Music Direction	Film: Zabardast
2008	Zee Gaurav Puraskar	Best Music Direction	Film: Bandh Premache
2008	Akhil Bhartiy Marathi Chitrpat Mahamandal Awards	Best Music Direction	Film: Tujhya Majhya Sansarala Aani Kaay Have
2008	Akhil Bhartiy Marathi Chitrpat Mahamandal Awards	Best Playback Singer- Ajay Gogavale	Film: Tujhya Majhya Sansarala Aani Kaay Have
2008	Sanskruti Kala Darpan	Best Music Direction	Film: Tujhya Majhya Sansarala Aani Kaay Have
2009	Maharashtra Times Sanman	Best Music Direction	TV series: Raja Shivchhatrapati
2009	V Shantaram Awards	Best Music Direction	Film: Uladhaal
2009	V Shantaram Awards	Best Playback Singer- Ajay Gogavale	Film: Uladhaal, Song- Morya Morya
2009	Maharashtracha Favourite Kon?	Best Playback Singer- Ajay Gogavale	Film: Uladhaal, Song- Morya Morya
2009	Late Music Director Shrikant Thackeray Awards	Best Music Direction	–
2009	Sanskruti Kala Darpan	Best Music Direction	Film: Jogwa
2009	Maharashtra Times Sanman	Best Music Direction	Film: Jogwa
2010	National Film Awards	Best Music Direction	Film: Jogwa
2010	Zee Gaurav Puraskar	Best Music Direction	Film: Natarang
2010	Zee Gaurav Puraskar	Best Playback Singer- Ajay Gogavale	Film: Natarang, Song: Khel Mandla
2010	Sanskruti Kala Darpan	Best Music Direction	Film: Natarang
2010	Maharashtra Times Sanman	Best Music Direction	Film: Natarang
2010	Shivgaurav	Influential Personalities	–
2010	47th State Film Awards	Best Music Direction	Film: Natarang
2010	47th State Film Awards	Best Playback Singer- Ajay Gogavale	Film: Natarang, Song: Khel Mandla
2010	V Shantaram Awards	Best Playback Singer- Ajay Gogavale	Film: Natarang, Song: Khel Mandla
2010	V Shantaram Awards	Best Background Score	Film: Natarang
2010	V Shantaram Awards	Best Music Direction	Film: Natarang
2010	Star Majha "Majha Sanman"	Best Music Direction	–
2010	Bal Gandharva Awards	Best Music Direction	–
2010	BIG FM BIG Music Director Award	Best Music Direction	Film: Natarang
2010	BIG FM BIG Playback Singer Award	Best Playback Singer- Ajay Gogavale	Film: Natarang, Song: Khel Mandla
2010	BIG FM BIG Song of the Year Award	Best Song of the Year	Film: Natarang, Song: Apsara Aali
2010	Pu. La. Tarunai Sanman	Music Direction	–
2010	Maharashtracha Favourite Kon?	Best Playback Singer- Ajay Gogavale	Film: Natarang, Song: Khel Mandla
2010	Maharashtracha Favourite Kon?	Best Song	Film: Natarang, Song: Wajle Ki Bara
2011	Marathi International Film and Theater Awards	Best Music Direction	Film: Natarang
2011	Marathi International Film and Theater Awards	Best Playback Singer- Ajay Gogavale	Film: Natarang, Song: Khel Mandla
2011	Ram Kadam Kalagaurav Award	Music Direction	–
2011	Zee Marathi Awards	Best Judges	Sa Re Ga Ma Pa (Marathi) Season – X
2012	Zee Gaurav Awards	Marathi Paul Padte Pudhe	–
2013	Zee Cine Awards	Best Background Score	Film: Agneepath
2013	Rajarshee Shahu Gaurav Puraskar	–	–
2013	ETC Business Awards	Most popular song of 2012 – Chikni Chameli	Film: Agneepath
2013	Stardust Awards	Best Music Direction	Film: Agneepath
2013	5th Mirchi Music Awards	Song of the year	Abhi Mujh Me Kahin Film: Agneepath
2013	5th Mirchi Music Awards	Album of the year	Film: Agneepath
2013	5th Mirchi Music Awards	Music Composer of The Year	Film: Agneepath
2013	Times of India Film Awards 2013	Best Music Director	Film: Agneepath
2014	Mirchi Music Awards 2014	Best Music Director	Film: Nilkanth Master
2015	Filmfare Awards 2015	Best Music Director	Film:Lai Bhaari
2017	Filmfare Awards 2017	Best Music Director	Film:Sairat
2017	Mirchi Music Awards 2017	Best Music Director	Film:Sairat
2019	11th Mirchi Music Awards	Best song producer	Film:Dhadak
2019	Zee Cine Awards 2019	Best Music Director	Film: Dhadak
2020	12th Mirchi Music Awards	Best arranging and programming	Jugrafiya Film: Super30
2021	13th Mirchi Music Awards	Music Composer Of The Decade	Film: Agneepath
2021	13th Mirchi Music Awards	Song Of The Decade	Abhi Mujh Me Kahin Film: Agneepath
2021	Mirchi Music Awards Marathi	Song Programming and Arranging of the Decade	Yaad Lagala Film: Sairat
2021	Mirchi Music Awards Marathi	Music Composer of the Decade	Film: Sairat
2021	Mirchi Music Awards Marathi	Song of the Decade	Mauli Mauli Film: Lai Bhaari
2021	Mirchi Music Awards Marathi	Album of the Decade	Film: Sairat
2021	Mirchi Music Awards Marathi	Listener Choice Song of the Decade	Sairat Jhala Ji Film: Sairat
2022	7th Filmfare Awards Marathi	Best Music Director	Chandramukhi
2022	Zee Chitra Gaurav Puraskar	Best Music Director	Chandramukhi
2023	8th Filmfare Awards Marathi	Best Music Director	Maharashtra Shahir
2023	Zee Chitra Gaurav Puraskar	Best Music Director	Maharashtra Shahir
2023	61st Maharashtra State Film Awards	Best Music Director	Maharashtra Shahir

== See also ==
- List of Indian film music directors
