= Nilkanth Master =

2015 Indian film

- Theatrical release poster
- Directed by: Gajendra Ahire
- Written by: Gajendra Ahire
- Produced by: Meghmala Balbheem Pathare
- Starring: Omkar Govardhan; Pooja Sawant; Adinath Kothare; Neha Mahajan
- Cinematography: Krishna Soren
- Edited by: Ballu Saluja
- Music by: Ajay-Atul
- Production company: Akshar Films Pvt Ltd
- Distributed by: Indian Films Studios
- Release date: 7 August 2015
- Country: India
- Language: Marathi

Nilkanth Master is a 2015 Indian Marathi-language drama film directed by Gajendra Ahire, also provided screenplay story and dialogues. It is produced by Meghmala Balbheem Pathare under the banner of Akshar Films Pvt Ltd. The film stars Omkar Govardhan, Pooja Sawant, Adinath Kothare and Neha Mahajan. The film was theatrically released on 7 August 2015.

== Plot ==
Vishwanath joins a revolutionary group and earn trust of Vyankatesh who was planning a secret mission to loot.

Vyankatesh is shot in cross firing by English policemen and leaves a message for Yashoda with Vishwanath while dying.

Vishwanath is devastated by this incidence and goes to his family instead. His family is unhappy with his active participation in a revolutionary group. Local police Raosaheb asks him to come meet urgently and tells him about police coming to catch him.

He runs away from there, takes name as Nilkanth Master and moves to a village as a teacher. He sees Indu there who was now married to a mad but rich man. She was in love with Vishwanath before he moved to Mumbai and later joined the group.

Vishwanath aka Mastar meets Yashoda but cannot tell her that her fiancé died so he tells her that Vyankatesh is captured and is in some jail. He starts to have feelings while taking care of her when she falls ill.

Indu is jealous of Vishwanath seeing Yashoda and seduces him. Also tries to blackmail him about revealing his true identity. One of the servants overhears their conversation and gives a tip to police. While police attack, Vishwanath is asked to run away with Yashoda.

Yashoda then tries to go away alone when Vishwanath lies again saying Vyankatesh has run from jail and asked to look after her. To hide from police they take cover and start working as labours in a farm as a couple.

Police were still searching for them. One day Yashoda notices Vishwanath staring at her and is also questioned by other women about not having kids yet. She forces him to find out about the other folks in the movement which is when he leaves and finds a guy who tells him what happened since when they left.

In the gun-firing back at Indu's mansion, her father in law and Yashoda's father are killed. While police were trying to find evidence and collect information, Indu sets everything on fire including the mansion and herself. Vishwanath is devastated to know that and feels guilty about the fact he could not save anyone.

Yashoda on the other hand is almost caught by police but she kills one of them and runs from there for several days until reaching a safe house and starts living there as Fatima in a Muslim doctor's house.

Vishwanath comes back to take Yashoda but sees their farm owner being arrested and gets to know that their secret was revealed. He roams around looking for Yashoda and finally goes back home to see his father dead, mother not in her senses.

He decides to stay there and hide for a few days. Local police Raosaheb who helped him earlier, questions him about the purpose of the freedom fight. And Vishwanath gives him explanation on why he is fighting.

Cholera pandemic starts to spread like a wildfire and it catches to Vishwanath as well. While in the camp, Yashoda notices him being extremely unwell, takes care of him without thinking about her being exposed. Finally police arrest them both and send them in jail.

India becomes independent and they two meet again. Vishwanath finally tells her the truth and she also tells him that she respects his feelings about her but she would rather be a widow of Vyankatesh than be with him.

== Cast ==
- Omkar Govardhan as Vishwanath
- Adinath Kothare as Vyankatesh
- Neha Mahajan as Yashoda
- Pooja Sawant as Indu
- Rahul Solapurkar as police who is hunting Vishwanath
- Vikram Gokhle as freedom fighter also Indu's father in law
- Mangesh Pawar as servant and informant

== Soundtrack ==
Nilkanth Master

Soundtrack album by Ajay-Atul
- Released: 2015
- Recorded: 2015
- Genre: Feature film soundtrack
- Length: 15:47
- Language: Marathi

Official audio
- Nilkanth Master – Full Album on YouTube

Track listing
| No. | Title | Singer(s) | Length |
|---|---|---|---|
| 1. | "Adhir Man Jhale" | Shreya Ghoshal | 4:10 |
| 2. | "Paratun Ye Na" | Javed Ali, Shreya Ghoshal | 3:11 |
| 3. | "Kaunse Des Chala" | Ajay-Atul, Shreya Ghoshal | 5:22 |
| 4. | "Vande Mataram" | Ajay-Atul | 3:04 |
| Total length: | | | 15:47 |

== Reception ==
Mihir Bhanage of The Times of India gave it 2 out of 5 stars, calling the film "The performances sustain the film but don't salvage it. The hastiness shows as the plot goes haywire. Better editing and implementation of the story could’ve made this a good watch but alas, it's not". Ganesh Matkari of Pune Mirror gave the film two and a half stars out of five and opining that "To sum it up, it is a mildly curious and yet annoying film, which starts off well but then gets lost. It's not entirely a waste of time but keep your expectations in check". Soumitra Pote of Maharashtra Times rated the film 2.5 out of 5 stars and wrote "Art direction is also good. The point remains that if this was a love story, the bond between these three would have been much more fun if it had been explored separately keeping in mind the times".
