= Jogwa =

- Theatrical poster for Jogwa
- Directed by: Rajiv Patil
- Written by: Rajan Gavas
- Screenplay by: Sanjay Krishnaji Patil
- Produced by: Shripal Morakhia
- Starring: Upendra Limaye; Mukta Barve
- Cinematography: Sanjay Jadhav
- Edited by: Rajesh Rao
- Music by: Songs: Ajay-Atul; Score: Vijay Narayan Gavande
- Production company: iDream Production Pvt Ltd.
- Release date: 25 September 2009
- Running time: 114 min
- Country: India
- Language: Marathi

Jogwa is a 2009 Marathi-language drama film directed by Rajiv Patil and produced under iDream Productions with screenplay by Sanjay Krishnaji Patil. It stars Upendra Limaye and Mukta Barve while Priya Berde, Vinay Apte, Sharvani Pillai and Kishor Kadam essay supporting roles.

At the 56th National Film Awards ceremony in 2010, the film won National Film Award for Best Film on Social Issues, National Film Award for Best Actor for Limaye, National Film Award for Best Music Direction for Ajay Atul, National Film Award for Best Male Playback Singer for Hariharan for song "Jeev Rangla" and National Film Award for Best Female Playback Singer for Shreya Ghoshal for the same.

It contains strong romantic elements, that explore the life of a rural people from Maharashtra who are the devotees of Goddess Yellamma, known as "Jogtin" (female) and "Jogta" (male) and are treated as slaves viewed with a mixture of semi-respect.

Jogwa actually means alms given to a person, usually known as a Jogta or a Jogtin. They are forced by the society to give up everything and serve God. A jogta has to give up the fact of being a man and suppress all his desires. A jogtin is expected to give up herself, she cannot get married, have children or have a life of her own.

This tradition was followed in the rural areas in the ancient times and like any tradition was flexible enough for those in power to misuse it. It is known to be still followed in some villages in Karnataka. Jogwa is a love story between jogta played by Upendra Limaye and jogtin played by Mukta Barve.

On the centenary of Indian cinema in April 2013, Forbes included Limaye's performance in the film on its list, "25 Greatest Acting Performances of Indian Cinema".

== Plot ==
The story of Jogwa is about Tayappa (Upendra Limaye) and Suli (Mukta Barve), who are forced by their families to become jogtins, a practice where they have to dress as women, beg for alms, and serve a deity. Suli becomes a jogtin because her hair has a knot, and Tayappa is compelled to act like a girl because he has blood in his urine. They both meet others like them and form groups. Living this way affects them mentally, and they lose their courage. Through their troupe, they learn about the lives of jogtins.

Yamnya (Kishor Kadam), a male jogtin endure sexual abuse from young men at first, but eventually finds comfort in it and sees it as their only source of pleasure aside from alcohol. The female jogtins often turn to prostitution, facing betrayal and despair, with many resorting to suicide. Yamnya warns Tayappa that he'll come to enjoy the attention from men as his femininity becomes fixed in his being. Tayappa is deeply affected by these words. He reflects on his loveless marriage, where his wife feels unfulfilled due to his lack of emotional connection. She eventually leaves him for another man. Along the journey, many young jogtins, including Suli, are deceived by men and end their lives tragically (except Suli). Suli becomes pregnant and is expelled from her home after undergoing a forced abortion.

A social worker tries to raise awareness in the village against harmful practices and superstitions, but the jogtins and villagers attack him and force him to leave. Suli and Tayappa can only watch helplessly as they cannot intervene.

Eventually, Tayappa is also kicked out of his home. He shares his feelings with Suli, who happily agrees to marry him. They both decide to get married. When the villagers find out, they try to force them back into being jogtins. Suli and Tayappa fight against this pressure and ultimately succeed in marrying each other.

== Cast ==
- Upendra Limaye as Tayappa
- Mukta Barve as Suli
- Kishor Kadam as Yamnya
- Vinay Apte as Basappa
- Anand Alkunte as Mharatya
- Anita Date-Kelkar as Sakhu
- Priya Arun as Shevantakka
- Amita Khopkar as Akkubai
- Pramod Pawar as Subana
- Vidya Karanjikar as Bayja
- Aditi Deshpande as Taanu
- Vijay Salve as Mhadu
- Rajan Gavas as More Sir
- Prashan Patil as Annu
- Sharvani Pillai as Parvvaa
- Smita Tambe as Phula
- Vinayak Karanjikar as Raghu
- Chinmay Mandlekar as Sakhya Patil
- Milind Oak as Pujari
- Komal Aapke as Ratnavva
- Rajhans Shinde as Hanmya
- Ujjwala Shah as Kalawwa
- Sunil Shahane as Thorla Jadhav
- Ravi Inamdar as Bhima Patil
- Rohit Chavan as Balu
- Bhalchandra Kane as Ganpa Misa

== Soundtrack ==
Jogwa

Soundtrack album by Ajay–Atul
- Released: September 2009
- Recorded: 2009
- Genre: Feature film soundtrack
- Length: 18:10
- Language: Marathi
- Label: Sony Music
- Producer: Shripal Morakhia

Ajay–Atul chronology
Oxygen: Jiv Gudmartoy (2009)	Jogwa (2009)	Natarang (2010)

Music videos
- "Jeev Rangla" on YouTube

The Marathi music duo Ajay–Atul composed varied compositions including romantic and traditional Gondhal. The song "Jeev Rangla" won a National Film Award in 2010.

=== Track listing ===
No.	Title	Lyrics	Music	Singer(s)	Length
1.	"Man Ranaat Gela Ga"	Sanjay Patil	Ajay-Atul	Shreya Ghoshal	4:19
2.	"Lallati Bhandar"	Sanjay Patil	Ajay-Atul	Ajay Gogavale	5:02
3.	"Jeev Rangla"	Sanjay Patil	Ajay-Atul	Hariharan, Shreya Ghoshal	4:43
4.	"Harinichya Daarat"	Sanjay Patil	Ajay-Atul	Anand Shinde	4:35
Total length:					18:10

== Critical reception ==
The film is internationally acclaimed, praised by critics and audience alike and won awards like Best Director Award, three prominent awards, 12 nominations in various categories at the Zee Chitra Gaurav Puraskar 2009 along with 13 nominations for depiction of culture and society and First Special Jury Award and Audience Choice Award at the Pune International Film Festival.

Jogwa received critical acclaim, with praise for Upendra Limaye, Mukta Barve & Kishor Kadam's performance. Talib Shaikh of MouthShut.com called the film "A different unusual yet great social cinema". Janani Rajeshwari S. in her review in Verandah called the film "Jogwa’ remains one of the most poignant films by director Rajiv Patil that touched upon such a tradition with utmost finesse and subtlety." Chetana Gavkhadkar of MarathiMovieWorld called the film "It comes out strong against superstition". The Times of India described film as "breaking away from tradition".

== Awards ==
- Got 37 Awards out of 60 Nominations before its commercial release.
- Zee Gaurav Award 2009 Got 12 Nominations.
- 8 Maharashtra State Film Awards for Best Film, Best Director, Best Actor & Best Actress.
- 9 Zee Chitra Gaurav Puraskar for Best Film, Best Director, Best Actor & Best Actress.
- 7 V. Shantaram Awards for Best Film.
- 7 Sanskruti Kala Darpan Awards for Best Film.
- 5 Maharashtra Times Awards for Best Film.
- International Film Festival, Pune Awards For Best Film.
- Marathi International Film & Theater Awards- Best Actress - Mukta Barve
- Marathi International Film & Theater Awards- Best lyricist - Sanjay Patil
- Marathi International Film & Theater Awards- Best Cinematography - Sanjay Jadhav

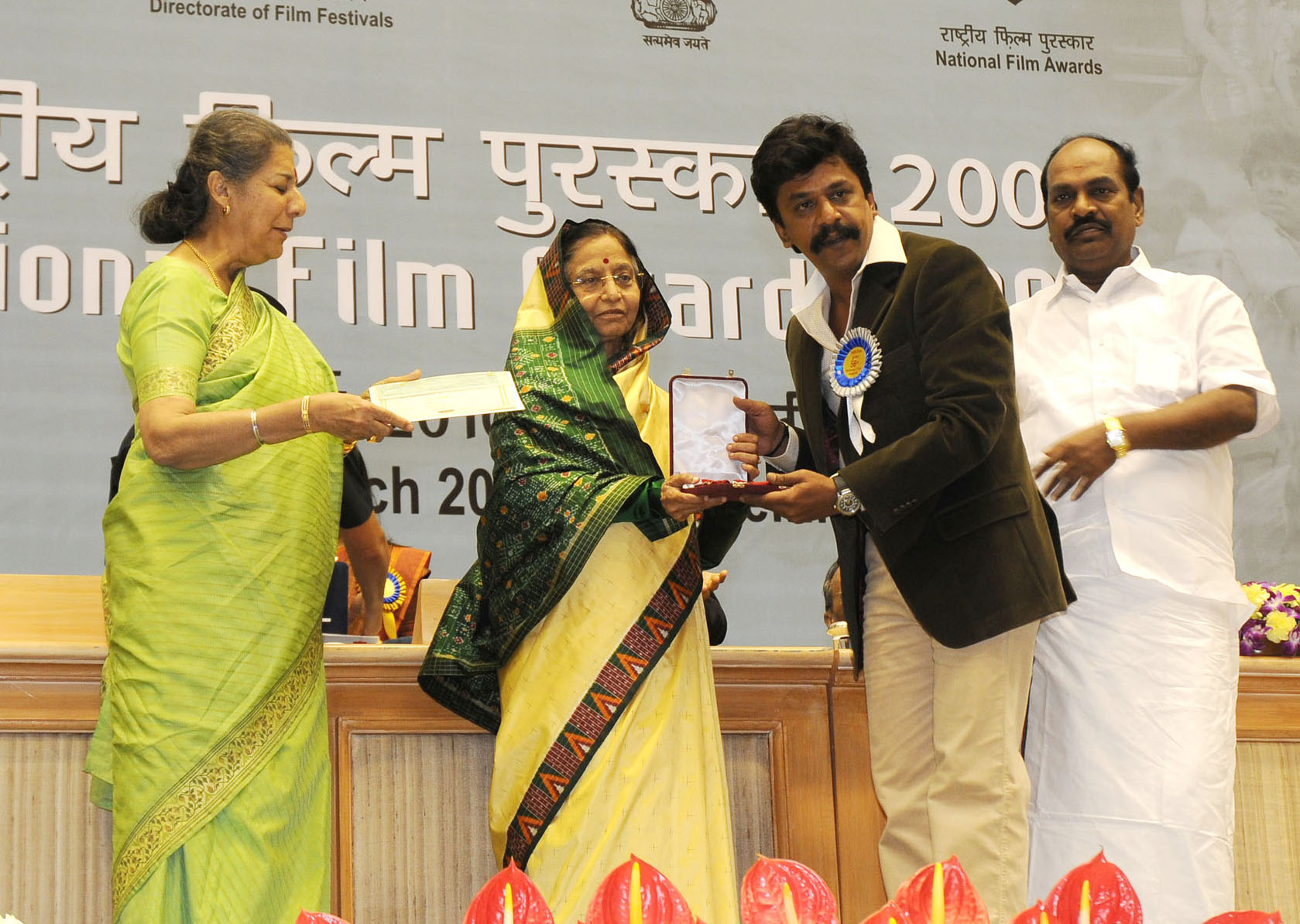
Upendra Limaye receiving National Film Award for Best Actor for Marathi film ‘Jogva’, at the 56th National Film Awards function, 2010.

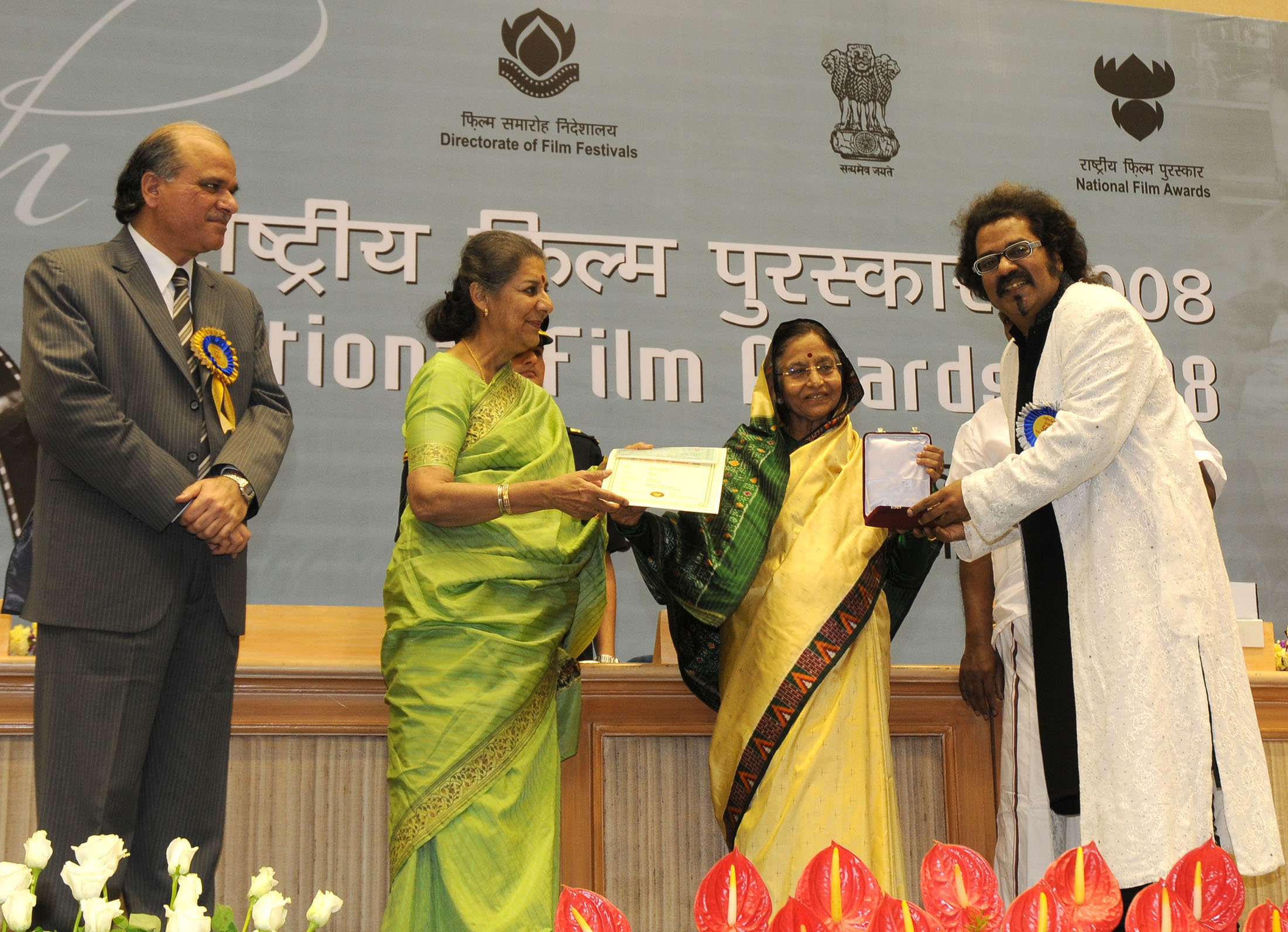
Hariharan receiving National Film Award for Best Male Playback Singer for Marathi film ‘Jogva’, 2010.

Award	Category	Recipient	Result
56th National Film Awards	National Film Award for Best Actor	Upendra Limaye	Won
56th National Film Awards	National Film Award for Best Male Playback Singer	Hariharan (for song " Jiv Rangala ")	Won
56th National Film Awards	National Film Award for Best Female Playback Singer	Shreya Ghoshal (for song " Jiv Rangala ")	Won
56th National Film Awards	National Film Award for Best Music Direction	Ajay-Atul	Won
56th National Film Awards	National Film Award for Best Film on Other Social Issues	Shripal Morakhia	Won
Zee Chitra Gaurav Puraskar	Best Story	Rajan Gavas	Nominated
Zee Chitra Gaurav Puraskar	Best Screenplay	Sanjay Patil	Won
Zee Chitra Gaurav Puraskar	Best Dialogue	Sanjay Patil	Won
Zee Chitra Gaurav Puraskar	Best Cinematography	Sanjay Jadhav	Won
Zee Chitra Gaurav Puraskar	Best Editing	Rajesh Rao	Nominated
Zee Chitra Gaurav Puraskar	Best Production Design	Mahesh Salgaonkar	Nominated
Zee Chitra Gaurav Puraskar	Best Supporting Actress	Aditi Deshpande	Won
Zee Chitra Gaurav Puraskar	Best Supporting Actor	Kishor Kadam	Won
Zee Chitra Gaurav Puraskar	Best Actress	Mukta Barve	Won
Zee Chitra Gaurav Puraskar	Best Actor	Upendra Limaye	Won
Zee Chitra Gaurav Puraskar	Best Director	Rajiv Patil	Won
Zee Chitra Gaurav Puraskar	Best Film	Shripal Mokharia	Won
Maharashtra State Film Awards	Best Story	Rajan Gavas	Nominated
Maharashtra State Film Awards	Best Screenplay	Sanjay Patil	Nominated
Maharashtra State Film Awards	Best Dialogue	Sanjay Patil	Nominated
Maharashtra State Film Awards	Best Costume Design	Neha Nupura	Won
Maharashtra State Film Awards	Best Lyricist	Sanjay Patil	Won
Maharashtra State Film Awards	Best Music Direction	Ajay-Atul	Won
Maharashtra State Film Awards	Best Actress	Mukta Barve	Won
Maharashtra State Film Awards	Best Actor	Upendra Limaye	Won
Maharashtra State Film Awards	Best Director	Rajiv Patil	Won
Maharashtra State Film Awards	Best Film	Shripal Mokharia	Won
V. Shantaram Awards	Best Director	Rajiv Patil	Nominated
V. Shantaram Awards	Best Film	Shripal Mokharia	Won
Maharashtra Times Sanman Awards	Best Supporting Actor	Kishor Kadam	Nominated
Maharashtra Times Sanman Awards	Best Actress	Mukta Barve	Nominated
Maharashtra Times Sanman Awards	Best Actor	Upendra Limaye	Won
Maharashtra Times Sanman Awards	Best Director	Rajiv Patil	Nominated
Maharashtra Times Sanman Awards	Best Film	Shripal Mokharia	Won
