= 14th MFK Awards =

Maharashtra film awards

14th Maharashtracha Favourite Kon? Awards
- Presented on: 18 January 2024
- Hosted by: Amey Wagh, Mahesh Manjrekar
- Organized by: Zee Talkies

Highlights
- Best Film: Ved
- Best Direction: Riteish Deshmukh for Ved
- Best Actor: Riteish Deshmukh for Ved
- Best Actress: Genelia Deshmukh for Ved
- Most awards: Ved (7)
- Most nominations: Ved (15)

Television coverage
- Network: Zee Talkies

The 14th Maharashtracha Favourite Kon? Awards ceremony, presented by the Marathi television channel Zee Talkies, honored the best Marathi-language Indian films of 2023. The ceremony was held on 18 January 2024, and was hosted by Amey Wagh and Mahesh Manjrekar. The year also introduced Critics choice awards in six categories.

Ved led the ceremony with 15 nominations, followed by Vaalvi with 11 and Maharashtra Shahir with 9 nominations.

Ved earned 7 awards, including Favourite Film, Favourite Director, Favourite Actor, and Favourite Actress, making it the most-awarded film of the ceremony, whereas Godavari earned 3 awards — Favourite Film Critics, Favourite Director Critics and Favourite Actor Critics.

Riteish Deshmukh got 3 nominations in different categories and won all three, while Genelia Deshmukh won both awards for which she was nominated. Whereas, Jitendra Joshi received 3 nominations in two categories and won Favourite Actor Critics. Nagraj Manjule received 2 nominations for Favourite Actor and Supporting Actor, winning the latter. Ajay Gogavale got 4 nominations in the Favourite Singer – Male category, winning for the song Ved Tujha from Ved.

== Winners and nominees ==
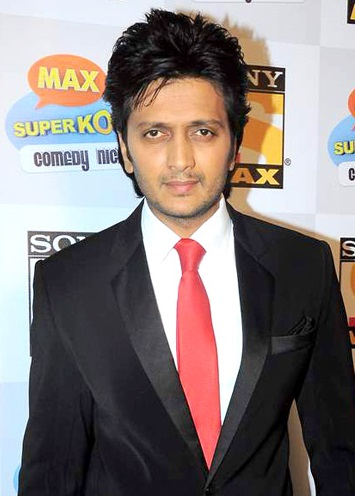
Riteish Deshmukh, Favourite Director, Favourite Actor & Style Icon of the Year

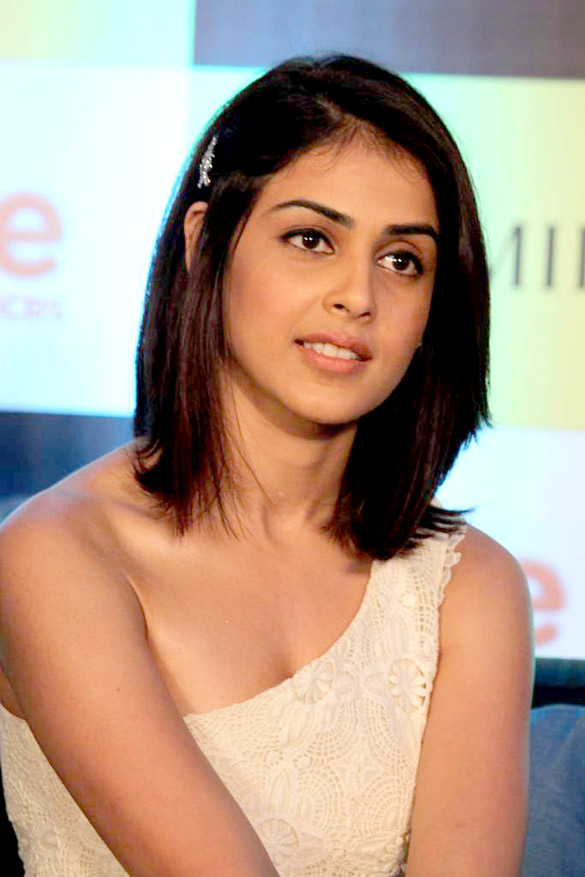
Genelia Deshmukh, Favourite Actress & Popular face of the Year

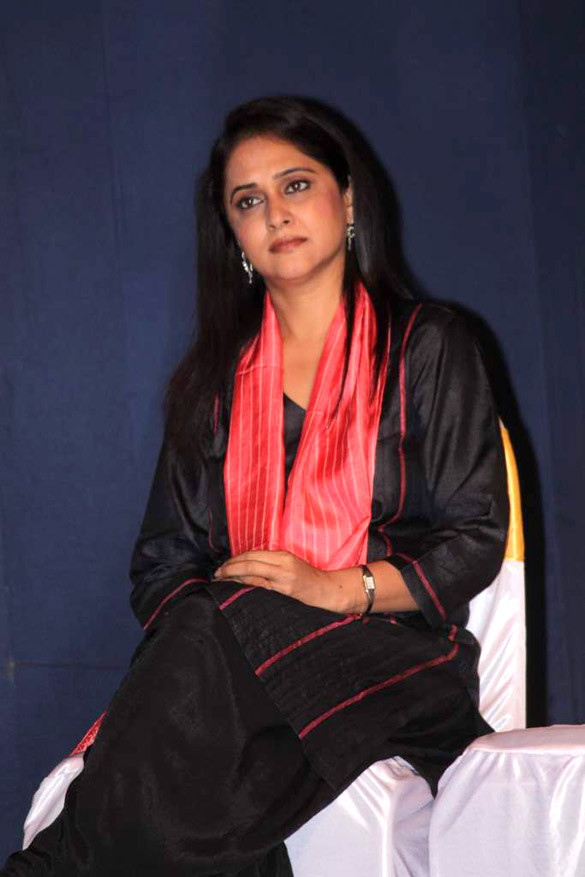
Mrinal Kulkarni, Favourite Supporting Actress

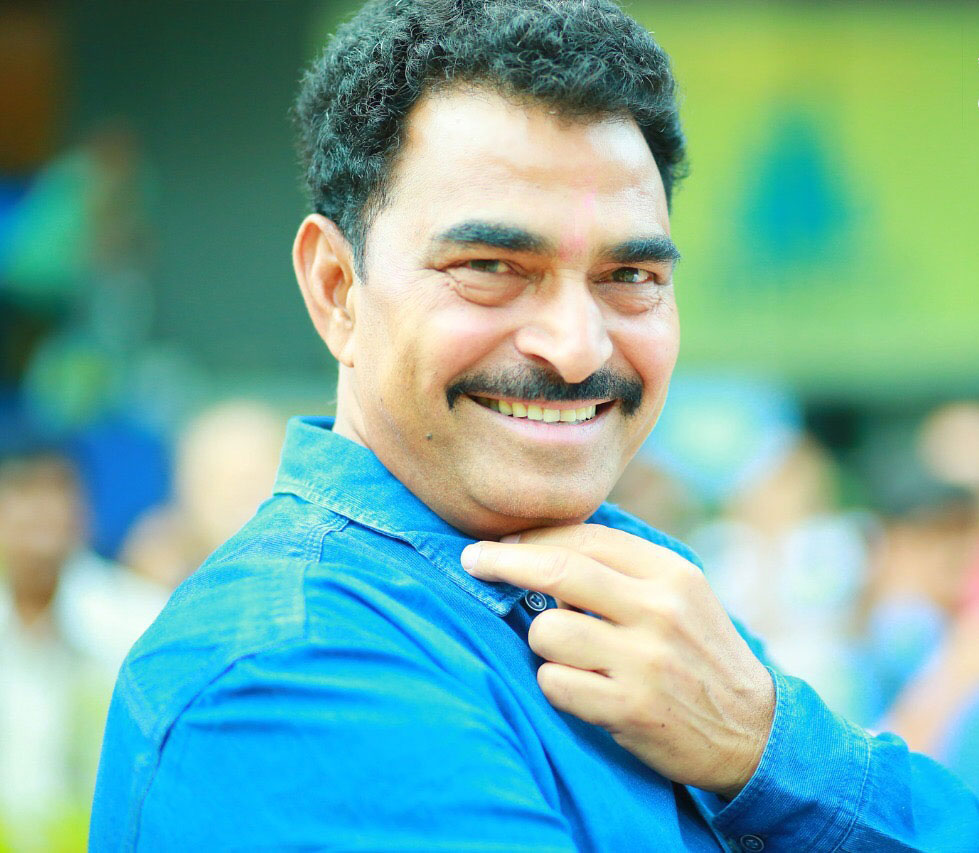
Sayaji Shinde, Favourite Villain

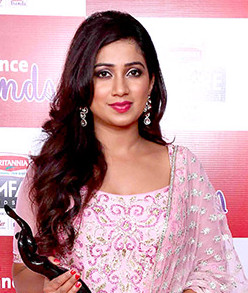
Shreya Ghosal, Favourite Female Singer

Favourite Film: Ved; Baipan Bhaari Deva; Subhedar; Maharashtra Shahir; Vaalvi; Naal 2; Jhimma 2; Ghar Banduk Biryani	Favourite Director: Riteish Deshmukh – Ved; Kedar Shinde – Baipan Bhaari Deva; Kedar Shinde – Maharashtra Shahir; Digpal Lanjekar – Subhedar; Paresh Mokashi – Vaalvi; Sudhakar Reddy Yakkanti – Naal 2; Hemant Dhome – Jhimma 2; Hemant Jangal Awtade – Ghar Banduk Biryani
Favourite Actor: Riteish Deshmukh – Ved; Ankush Chaudhari – Maharashtra Shahir; Swapnil Joshi – Vaalvi; Subodh Bhave – Vaalvi; Nagraj Manjule – Ghar Banduk Biryani; Ajay Purkar – Subhedar	Favourite Actress: Genelia Deshmukh – Ved; Rohini Hattangadi, Vandana Gupte, Sukanya Kulkarni, Shilpa Navalkar, Suchitra Bandekar, Deepa Parab – Baipan Bhaari Deva; Suhas Joshi, Nirmiti Sawant, Kshitee Jog, Suchitra Bandekar, Sayali Sanjeev, Shivani Surve, Rinku Rajguru – Jhimma 2; Shivani Surve – Vaalvi
Favourite Supporting Actor: Nagraj Manjule – Naal 2; Jitendra Joshi – Naal 2; Siddharth Chandekar – Jhimma 2; Shubhankar Tawde – Ved; Akash Thosar – Ghar Banduk Biryani	Favourite Supporting Actress: Mrinal Kulkarni – Subhedar; Jiya Shankar – Ved; Anita Date – Vaalvi; Deepti Devi – Naal 2; Devika Daftardar – Naal 2
Favourite Villain: Sayaji Shinde – Ghar Banduk Biryani; Raviraj Kande – Ved; Digvijay Rohidas – Subhedar; Pravin Tarde – Chowk	Favourite Song: "Sukh Kalale" – Ved; "Ved Lavlay" – Ved; "Ved Tujha" – Ved; "Kevadyacha Paan Tu" – Sarla Ek Koti; "Baharla Ha Madhumas" – Maharashtra Shahir; "Gau Nako Kisna" – Maharashtra Shahir; "Mangalagaur" – Baipan Bhaari Deva; "Baipan Bhari Deva" – Baipan Bhaari Deva; "Marathi Pori" – Jhimma 2
Favourite Singer – Male: Ajay Gogavale – "Ved Tujha" – Ved; Ajay Gogavale, Vishal Dadlani – "Ved Lavlay" – Ved; Jayesh Khare – "Gau Nako Kisna" – Maharashtra Shahir; Ajay Gogavale – "Baharla Ha Madhumas" – Maharashtra Shahir; Ajay Gogavale – "Kevadyacha Paan Tu" – Sarla Ek Koti; Adarsh Shinde – "Marathi Pori" – Jhimma 2	Favourite Singer – Female: Shreya Ghosal – "Sukh Kalale" – Ved; Savani Ravindra – "Mangalagaur" – Baipan Bhaari Deva; Shreya Ghosal – "Baharla Ha Madhumas" – Maharashtra Shahir; Aarya Ambekar – "Kevadyacha Paan Tu" – Sarla Ek Koti; Vaishali Samant, Mugdha Karhade – "Marathi Pori" – Jhimma 2
Favourite Style Icon: Riteish Deshmukh; Ankush Chaudhari; Swapnil Joshi; Siddharth Jadhav; Lalit Prabhakar; Amey Wagh; Siddharth Chandekar	Favourite Popular Face of the Year: Genelia Deshmukh; Sonalee Kulkarni; Sai Tamhankar; Amruta Khanvilkar; Shivani Surve; Sayali Sanjeev; Rinku Rajguru; Vaidehi Parshurami
Favourite Song (Non-film): "Nauvari Pahije" – Sanju Rathod; "Jhumka" – Sanju Rathod, Abhiman Marathi Adhikrut; "Patlancha Bailgada" – Swapnil Gaikwad, Nateshwari Music Pvt Ltd; "Mehbooba" – Preet Bendre; "Pahilyanda " – Prasad Shirsath, Brahmaa, Jagdamba Productions; "Pirmachi Lagan" – Kunal Karan, Ace Production; "Heartbreak Jhala" – Prashant Nakti

=== Critics ===
Favourite Film: Godavari; Aatmapamphlet; Shyamchi Aai; Tendlya; Vaalvi	Favourite Director: Nikhil Mahajan – Godavari; Ashish Bende – Aatmapamphlet; Sujay Dahake – Shyamchi Aai; Paresh Mokashi – Vaalvi; Sachin Jadhav, Nachiket Waikar – Tendlya
Favourite Actor: Jitendra Joshi – Godavari; Om Bhutkar – Shyamchi Aai; Swapnil Joshi – Vaalvi; Subodh Bhave – Vaalvi	Favourite Actress: Gauri Deshpande – Shyamchi Aai; Gauri Nalawade – Godavari; Neena Kulkarni – Godavari
Favourite Writer: Madhugandha Kulkarni, Paresh Mokashi – Vaalvi; Nikhil Mahajan, Prajakt Deshmukh – Godavari; Paresh Mokashi – Aatmapamphlet; Sunil Sukthankar – Shyamchi Aai; Sachin Jadhav, Nachiket Waikar – Tendlya; Sudhakar Reddy Yakkanti, Nagraj Manjule – Naal 2	Favourite Lyricist: Guru Thakur – "Umagaya Baap Ra" – Baaplyok; Jitendra Joshi – "Kojagiri" – Godavari; Jitendra Joshi – "Khal Khal Goda" – Godavari; Guru Thakur – "Kevadyacha Paan Tu" – Sarla Ek Koti; Guru Thakur – "Baharla Ha Madhumas" – Maharashtra Shahir; Ajay-Atul – "Sukh Kalale" – Ved; Ajay-Atul, Guru Thakur – "Ved Tujha" – Ved

=== Special awards ===
Special Awards
- Rohini Hattangadi, Vandana Gupte, Sukanya Kulkarni, Shilpa Navalkar, Suchitra Bandekar, Deepa Parab – Baipan Bhaari Deva
- Mrunal Thakur
Special Contribution Award
- Asha Kale

== Superlatives ==
Multiple nominations
Nominations	Film
15	Ved
11	Vaalvi
9	Maharashtra Shahir
8	Godavari
7	Naal 2
7	Jhimma 2
6	Baipan Bhaari Deva
5	Subhedar
5	Ghar Banduk Biryani
5	Shyamchi Aai
4	Sarla Ek Koti
3	Aatmapamphlet
3	Tendlya

Multiple wins
Awards	Film
7	Ved
3	Godavari

== See also ==
- Maharashtracha Favourite Kon?
