= Fakt Marathi Cine Sanman for Best Playback Singer Female =

Awards for Best Playback Singer Female

- Awarded for: Best Playback Singer Female
- Country: India
- Presented by: Fakt Marathi
- First award: Aarya Ambekar, "Bai Ga"; Chandramukhi (2022)
- Currently held by: Shreya Ghoshal, "Sukh Kalale"; Ved & Anandi Joshi, "Rang Lagala"; Tamasha Live (2023)

The Fakt Marathi Cine Sanman for Female Playback Singer is given by the Fakt Marathi television network as part of its annual awards for Marathi Cinemas. The winners are selected a jury. The award was first given in 2022.

Here is a list of the award winners (in bold text) and the nominees of the respective years.

== Winner and nominees ==
Year	Photos of winners	Singer	Song	Film	Ref.
2022		**Aarya Ambekar**	**"Bai Ga"**	**Chandramukhi**	
2022		Shreya Ghoshal	"To Chand Rati"	Chandramukhi	
2022		Vaishali Samant, Mugdha Karhade, Aarti Kelkar, Suhas Joshi	"Jhimma Title Song"	Jhimma	
2022		Amita Gugari	"Kaina"	Soyrik	
2022		Priyanka Barve	"Bindiya Le Gayi"	Me Vasantrao	
2023		**Shreya Ghoshal** (co-recipient)	**"Sukh Kalale"**	**Ved**	
2023		**Aanandi Joshi** (co-recipient)	**"Rang Lagala"**	**Tamasha Live**	
2023		Shreya Ghoshal	"Baharla Ha Madhumas"	Maharashtra Shahir	
2023		Vaishali Mhade	"Gar Gar Bingri"	De Dhakka 2	
2023		Aarya Ambekar	"Kevdyach Paan Tu"	Sarla Ek Koti	
2023		Mugda Karhade	"Alahida Parawa"	Ananya	
