= Sammarth =

2026 Indian Marathi-language film

- Directed by: Yogesh Phulphagar
- Written by: Ashutosh Bhosekar; Dialogues: Manas Layal
- Produced by: Manas Kinkar; Ravindra Pathak
- Starring: Bhushan Pradhan; Pushkaraj Chirputkar; Sharvari Jamenis; Hardeek Joshi; Isha Keskar
- Cinematography: Athit Naik
- Edited by: Vishal Bate
- Music by: Kedar Pandit; Rohit Raut
- Production companies: A3 Events & Media Services
- Distributed by: AA Films
- Release date: 14 August 2026
- Running time: 146 minutes
- Country: India
- Language: Marathi

Sammarth is an Indian Marathi-language drama film directed by Yogesh Phulphagar and produced by Ravindra Pathak under the banner of A3 Events & Media Services. The film stars Bhushan Pradhan in the title role, alongside Pushkaraj Chirputkar, Sharvari Jamenis, Hardeek Joshi, Isha Keskar and Prasad Khandekar.

The film centres on a young civil engineer whose life is upended by an unexpected crisis, prompting him to confront his childhood resentment towards his devout father and reconsider the teachings of the 17th-century Marathi saint Samarth Ramdas.

Sammarth was released theatrically on 14 August 2026 by AA Films. It received mixed reviews from critics, who were divided over the pacing of its screenplay while noting the performances of Pradhan and Chirputkar.

== Plot ==
Mr. Borgainkar, a devotee of the teachings of Samarth Ramdas, tires of city life and returns to his village to dedicate himself to spreading them. His wife supports the decision, but their young son Samarth grows up resenting his father for placing spiritual pursuit above the family. Samarth leaves to live with his maternal uncle in a larger town and eventually qualifies as a civil engineer, joining a major construction firm whose owner's daughter, Urvashi, becomes close to him. In the village, his childhood friend Goku becomes a lawyer, while Suma continues to care for his father. When a bridge collapse results in Samarth being jailed, he is forced to revisit his past, his beliefs and the ideas he had rejected.

== Cast ==
- Bhushan Pradhan as Sammarth
  - Ayaan Darekar as young Sammarth
- Pushkaraj Chirputkar as Borgainkar, Samarth's father
- Sharvari Jamenis as Samarth's mother
- Hardeek Joshi as Goku
  - Shirjay Deshpande as young Goku
- Isha Keskar as Suma
  - Abhidnya Mathvad as young Suma
- Prasad Khandekar as Mama
- Rajan Bhise as Deshmane
- Yatin Karyekar as Nanavati
- Disha Pardeshi as Urvashi
- Nikhil Raut as Marne

== Production ==
The film was directed by Yogesh Phulphagar, previously known for the family drama Baap Manus (2023). He described the film as an attempt to answer questions faced by the present generation through the ideas of Samarth Ramdas, saying the narrative sought a balance between tradition and modern life. Ravindra Pathak said the intention was to restart conversations between generations by combining spirituality, family values and human relationships.

== Soundtrack ==
The soundtrack consists of seven songs, five composed by the veteran composer Kedar Pandit and two by the singer-composer Rohit Raut. The background score was composed by Aditya Bedekar. The soundtrack was formally launched at the Ramkrishna More Auditorium in Chinchwad, Pune, in an event hosted by the actress Swanandi Tikekar and attended by Supriya Pilgaonkar as chief guest.

Track listing
No.	Title	Lyrics	Music	Singer(s)	Length
1.	"Mukhi Naam"	Nachiket Jog	Kedar Pandit	Shankar Mahadevan	4:14
2.	"Veda Mann"	Nachiket Jog	Kedar Pandit	Jaideep Vaidya	3:35
3.	"Vaat Gavasali"	Kedar Pandit	Nachiket Jog	Aniruddha Joshi	4:30
4.	"Bandh Vimochan Raam"	Sant Vennabai	Kedar Pandit	Aarya Ambekar	4:49
5.	"Vanva Kela"	Rohit Raut	Rohit Raut	Rohit Raut, Gandhaar	2:18
Total length:					19:26

== Release ==
The film's motion poster was unveiled at Alandi in May 2026. The film's poster was unveiled at an event attended by several thousand school children in June 2026. A teaser was released in mid-July 2026 and confirmed the release date, followed by the theatrical trailer in August 2026.

Sammarth was released in cinemas on 14 August 2026.

== Reception ==
Santosh Bhingarde of Sakal awarded the film 4 stars, writing that it "beautifully highlights why today's generation needs to turn to spirituality". Kapil Deshpande of Mumbai Tarun Bharat called it "a film that makes you introspect with the thoughts of Ramdas Swami", worth watching with the family, though he felt it would have gained from being fifteen minutes shorter. Keerti Kadam of CineBuster rated the film 3 stars and concluded that "Samarth succeeds in delivering its message without becoming preachy".
