= Kevadyacha Paan Tu =

- Official song cover

Song by Arya Ambekar, Ajay Gogavale

from the album Sarla Ek Koti
- Language: Marathi
- Released: 7 January 2023.
- Studio: Audio Talkies, Pune; Dawn Studio, Pune; Euphony Studio, Mumbai; Hilltop Studio, Mumbai; Sound Idea, Mumbai
- Genre: Soundtrack
- Length: 5:05
- Label: Ultra Music
- Composer: Vijay Narayan Gavande
- Lyricist: Guru Thakur
- Producer: Avi Lohar

Sarla Ek Koti track listing
- 1. "Kevadyacha Paan Tu"; 2. "Tharyavar Jeev Raahina"; 3. "Saimaya Sajani Le"

Music video
- Kevadyacha Paan Tu on YouTube

"Kevadyacha Paan Tu" (transl. You are a leaf of Kevda) is a Marathi-language song from the soundtrack album of 2023 Indian drama film Sarla Ek Koti, written and directed by Nitin Supekar. The song was composed by Vijay Narayan Gavande, voiced by Ajay Gogavale and Arya Ambekar, while lyrics are penned by Guru Thakur. The music video of the track was released on 7 January 2023 on YouTube, featuring Isha Keskar and Onkar Bhojane. The song became popular and gained traction on social media following its release.

== Credits ==
Credits adapted from YouTube.

- Music – Vijay Narayan Gavande
- Background score – Vijay Narayan Gavande
- Lyrics – Guru Thakur
- Singers – Ajay Gogavale, Arya Ambekar
- Cinematography – Nagraj Diwakar
- Editor – Nitesh Rathod
- Choreographer – Sujeet Kumar
- DI Colorist – Vinod Raje
- Music Production – Avi Lohar
- Flute – Paras Nath
- Shehnai – Yogesh More
- Ethnic String Instruments – Tapas Roy
- Percussion Instruments – Pratap Rath
- Orchestra section – Jitu Javada and team
- Mix and Mastering – Ishan Devsthalli
- Recording – Tushar Pandit, Sagar Sathe (Dawn Studio Pune), Abhishek Kate (Audio Talkies Pune), Kittu Mayank (Sound Idea Mumbai), Partha Das (Euphony Studio Mumbai), Rohan Mistry (Hilltop Studio Mumbai)
- Actors – Isha Keskar, Onkar Bhojane
- Music label – Ultra Music

== Music video ==
The song is picturized on actors Onkar Bhojane and Isha Keskar.

== Accolades ==
Year	Award	Category	Recipient (s) and Nominee (s)	Result	Ref.
2024	Radio City Cine Awards	Best Playback Singer Female	Arya Ambekar	Won	
2024	Maharashtracha Favourite Kon?	Favourite Song	"Kevadyacha Paan Tu"	Nominated	
2024	Maharashtracha Favourite Kon?	Favourite Singer – Male	Ajay Gogavale	Nominated	
2024	Maharashtracha Favourite Kon?	Favourite Singer – Female	Aarya Ambekar	Nominated	
2023	Fakt Marathi Cine Sanman	Best Playback Singer Female	Aarya Ambekar	Nominated	
