= Shaky (song) =

2025 single by Sanju Rathod

- Official song cover

Single by Sanju Rathod
- Language: Marathi
- Released: April 22, 2025
- Venue: Apostrophe Studios
- Genre: Indie folk; pop; afrobeats
- Length: 3:45
- Songwriter: Sanju Rathod
- Composer: Sanju Rathod
- Producer: G-Spark

Sanju Rathod singles chronology
"Kali Bindi" (2024)	"Shaky" (2024)	"Bappa Bhari Re" (2025)

Music video
- Shaky on YouTube

"Shaky" is a 2025 Marathi-language song by Indian singer-songwriter Sanju Rathod. Released as single on April 22, 2025, the song was written, composed, and performed by Rathod, with music production by G-Spark. The music video, directed by Himanshu Dhar, features Isha Malviya and was released under Rathod's official YouTube channel. "Shaky" blends traditional Marathi folk elements with contemporary sounds, including Afrobeats.

== Background ==
The song is written and performed by Sanju Rathod, with music production by his brother G-Spark, who has previously collaborated with Rathod on chartbusters like "Nauvari Pahije", "Kali Bindi", and "Gulabi Sadi". The track also features Isha Malviya, marking her debut in Marathi music, where she wore a lehenga weighing 40-45 kgs while dancing, making it extremely difficult to take a single step, yet she performed the entire dance sequence, including the signature Shaky step. For this track, Rathod blended contemporary sounds and Afrobeats with traditional Marathi folk elements. The outro features a hauntingly layer created by G-Spark, who improvised a few lines from an old Banjara folk song. They recorded and processed his voice to mimic a choral female section.

Rathod shares that "Shaky" marked a turning point for him. "After plenty of reflection and some genuine conversations, I managed to rediscover my rhythm. That single breakthrough not only laid the foundation for 'Shaky' but also sparked five or six more songs soon after," he says. Now, his focus is on pushing Marathi pop (M-pop) into fresh territory — "a space where folk meets pop, and tradition blends seamlessly with modernity." The outro of the track was developed from a contribution by G-Spark, who incorporated lines from a traditional Banjara folk song with Rajasthani influences. His vocals were subsequently recorded and digitally processed to emulate a female choral arrangement, resulting in a distinctive folk-inspired texture in the closing section of the song.

== Credits and personnel ==
Adapted from the official music video

=== Audio ===
- Sanju Rathod – singer, lyricist, composer
- G-Spark – music producer, mixing engineer
- Rupendar Venkatesh – mastering engineer
- Jagdish Bhandge – recording

=== Music video ===
- Himanshu Dhar – music video director
- Isha Malviya – featuring artist
- Manvir Dhaliwal – cinematographer
- Archit Warwade – choreographer
- Gomz Sahu – assistant choreographer
- Krishan Khanna – editor
- Gaurav Manku – VFX supervisor
- Onkar Singh – colourist

== Reception ==
"Shaky" became a viral success, garnering over 350 million views on YouTube and nearly 1.5 million streams on Spotify. The popular hook step recreated by many social media influencers and film and television personalities like Mrunal Thakur, Sonali Kulkarni, Gauahar Khan, Aishwarya Narkar, Avinash Narkar, Prapti Redkar, Shubhangi Latkar, Ritika Shrotri, Rajeshwari Kharat, and Ayesha Khan. The song crossed 100 million views on YouTube in one month and went viral on Instagram reels and YouTube shorts. It was among the top 10 trending videos on YouTube in Nepal.

In June 2025, the song reached #1 on YouTube's Global Top Music Videos chart and secured the top spot on the weekly chart for the week of June 20–26. "Shaky" peaked at #1 on Billboard India for the week of June 28, 2025. As of the first week of July 2025, the song held the top spot on the Gaana Indie Top 10 for the fourth consecutive week. In December 2025 the song became most viewed Marathi song on YouTube surpassed "Zingaat". It garnered 609 million views in eight months on YouTube.

== Live performances ==
Sanju performed the song at Filmfare awards Marathi 2025.

In October 2025, during a concert in Amravati Sanju performed song.

In December 2025, Rathod joined AP Dhillon at a concert in Pune, where he performed the song "Shaky."

== Charts ==
Chart performance for "Shaky"
Chart (2025)	Peak position
India (Billboard)	1
United Arab Emirates (IFPI)	14
