= Shaky (disambiguation) =

Shaky is a nickname given to Welsh singer and songwriter Shakin' Stevens (born 1948).

Shaky or Shakey may also refer to:

== People ==
=== Shakey ===
- Shakey Graves, stage name of Americana musician Alejandro Rose-Garcia (born 1987)
- Shakey Jake (1925–2007), American street musician and storyteller in Ann Arbor, Michigan
- Shakey Jake Harris (1921–1990), American Chicago blues singer, harmonica player and songwriter
- Big Walter Horton (1921–1981), American blues harmonica player
- Sherwood Johnson (1925–1998), American businessman, founder of Shakey's Pizza
- Mike Walton (born 1945), Canadian retired National Hockey League and World Hockey Association player
- "Bernard Shakey", pseudonym of Neil Young when he directs films

=== Shaky ===
- Jim Hunt (columnist) (1926–2006), Canadian sports columnist
- Thomas Kain (1907–1971), American minor league baseball player and manager, college football referee
- Shaky Kane or Shaky 2000, pseudonyms of British writer and psychedelic artist Michael Coulthard
- Bob Walton (1912–1992), Canadian hockey player

== Other uses ==
- Shaky (album), by Shakin' Stevens
- Shakey: Neil Young's biography, written by Jimmy McDonough
- Shakey River, Michigan, United States
- Shakey Sanchez, The Muppets character
- Shakey the robot, the first general-purpose mobile robot to be able to reason about its own actions, developed between 1966 and 1972
- Shakey's Frozen Custard, original name of Shake's Frozen Custard, an American franchise chain
- Shakey's Pizza, an American restaurant chain
- Shakey's V-League, a women's volleyball league in the Philippines
- Shaky, an enemy of Dick Tracy - see List of Dick Tracy villains
- "Shaky", a 2025 Marathi-language song by Sanju Rathod

== See also ==
- Douglas C-124 Globemaster II, a cargo airplane nicknamed "Old Shaky"
- Shaky Isles or Islands, a nickname for New Zealand
- Daly's bridge, also known as the Shakey Bridge, a pedestrian bridge in Cork, Ireland
