= Nashibvaan =

Nashibvaan : The Fortunate One
- Nashibvaan Movie Poster
- Directed by: Amol Gole
- Screenplay by: Amol Gole
- Story by: Amol Gole, Uday Prakash
- Produced by: Vidhi Kasliwal
- Starring: Bhalachandra Kadam; Mitalee Varadkar; Neha Joshi; Atul Aagalaavey; Rajesh Shringarpure
- Cinematography: Amol Vasant Gole
- Edited by: Karan Uday Shetty
- Music by: Nandu Ghanekar
- Production company: Landmarc films
- Release date: 11 January 2019
- Running time: 128 minutes
- Country: India
- Language: Marathi
- Box office: ₹0.8 crore (US$83,000) (2 days)

Nashibvaan is a 2019 Indian Marathi language with English Subtitles directed by Amol Gole. It is a Family Drama starring Bhalchandra Kadam, Mitalee Jagtap Varadkar, and Neha Joshi in lead roles. A Landmarc Films Presentation and a Flying God Films Production in association with Giri Media Factory. Nashibvaan was released in theatres on 11 January 2019.

== Plot ==
Baban is a sluggard who barely manages to bring home an income for the family from his job as a sweeper. In contrast, his prudent wife, Geeta, works as a housemaid to earn an extra buck. Though god-fearing, Baban's day-dreaming and drunken carousing continue to force the family to lead a hand to mouth existence...until one day when he accidentally uncovers an astounding stash of cash. As this streak of luck further fuels Baban's mindless ways, his wife Geeta wants to use this opportunity to secure her family's future, resulting in a rift in their relationship. His non-platonic feelings towards a young co-worker, Reshma further puts a strain on his marriage.

Hastening Baban's plunge back into misfortune is the local police inspector, Dhananjay Jadhav, who senses an easy win in tracing the source of Baban's unexplained riches.

Will Baban's luck stand by him one more time or will he find himself deserted by both his family and his newfound wealth?

== Cast ==
- Bhalchandra Kadam as Baban
- Mitalee Jagtap Varadkar as Geeta
- Neha Joshi as Reshma
- Atul Aagalaavey as Raakya
- Rajesh Shringarpure as Dhanajay Jadhav

== Soundtrack ==
Nashibvaan

Soundtrack album by Shivkumar Dhale
- Released: November 2018
- Genre: Feature film soundtrack
- Length: 14:03
- Language: Marathi
- Label: Zee Music Company

The soundtrack of Nashibvaan consists of four songs composed by Soham Pathak and written by Shivkumar Dhale.

Tracklist
No.	Title	Lyrics	Singer(s)	Length
1.	"Bhir Bhir Najar"	Shivkumar Dhale	Avdhoot Gandhi	03:03
2.	"Paakharu (happy)"	Shivkumar Dhale	Shalmali Kholgade	03:20
3.	"Bloody Fool Jiya Re"	Shivkumar Dhale	Anand Shinde	04:08
4.	"Paakharu (sad)"	Shivkumar Dhale	Suresh Wadkar	03:32
Total length:				14:03

== Release ==
Nashibvaanwas released on 11 January 2019 all over Maharashtra, India.

== Critical reception ==
Mihir Bhanage of The Times of India gave the film a rating of 3 out of 5 saying that, "Through the film, director Amol Gole aims to address the age-old question - how much is too much? He succeeds in that, a la the Icarus story, and in the process, also documents the changes wealth brings in a person’s behaviour." Ganesh Matkari of Pune Mirror gave the film a rating of 3 out of 5 and said that, "The film is effective in its straightforward message. It portrays a carefree life affected by the sudden change in the situation. From the emotional and psychological perspective, the film scores." Suparna Thombare of Cinestaan gave the film a rating of 3 out of 5 and said that, "Based on Uday Prakash's Hindi novel Dilli Ki Deewar, Nashibvaan is an entertaining film overall."
