= Fakt Marathi Cine Sanman for Best Lyricist =

Awards for Best Lyricist

- Awarded for: Best Songwriter
- Country: India
- Presented by: Fakt Marathi
- First award: Mangesh Kangane, "Anand Harpla"; Dharmaveer & Vaibhaiv Deshmukh, "Kaina"; Soyrik (2022)
- Currently held by: Ajay-Atul, "Sukh Kalale"; Ved (2023)

The Fakt Marathi Cine Sanman for Best Lyricist is given by the Fakt Marathi television network as part of its annual awards for Marathi Cinema. The winners are selected by a jury. The award was first given in 2022.

Here is a list of the award winners and the nominees of the respective years.

== Winner and nominees ==
Year	Lyricist	Song	Film	Ref.
2022	Mangesh Kangane	"Anand Harpla"	Dharmaveer	
2022	Vaibhaiv Deshmukh	"Kaina"	Soyrik	
2022	Guru Thakur, Ajay-Atul	"Bai Ga"	Chandramukhi	
2022	Kshtij Patwardhan	"Jhimma Title Song"	Jhimma	
2022	Vaibhav Joshi	"Punav Raticha"	Me Vasantrao	
2023	Ajay-Atul	"Sukh Kalale"	Ved	
2023	Jitendra Joshi	"Khal Khal Goda"	Godavari	
2023	Guru Thakur	"Gau Nako Kisna"	Maharashtra Shahir	
2023	Guru Thakur	"Tuzya Sobatiche"	Phulrani	
2023	Vaibhav Deshmukh	"Gun Gun"	Ghar Banduk Biryani	
2023	Abhishek Khankar	"Alahida Parawa"	Ananya	
