= Block by Block =

- Film poster
- Directed by: Hina Sayada
- Written by: Gautam Pemmaraju
- Produced by: Vidhi Kasliwal
- Starring: Sachin Khedekar Marathi Narrator; Raj Zutshi Hindi, English Narrator
- Cinematography: Viraj Singh
- Edited by: Hina Sayada
- Production company: Landmarc Films
- Release date: 11 April 2013 (Maharashtra)
- Running time: 23 minutes
- Country: India
- Languages: Hindi, English, Marathi

Block by Block is a 2013 Indian documentary film produced by Vidhi Kasliwal. A Landmarc Films production and presentation is directed by Hina Sayada. The film shows the experiences of construction laborers who built Palais Royale, Mumbai, the tallest building in India.

== Cast ==
This film was released in English, Hindi, and Marathi languages, and it is known as Saathi Haath Badhana in non-English versions. While the English and Hindi versions have Raj Zutshi as the narrator, the Marathi version was narrated by Sachin Khedekar.

== Accolades ==
Block by Block won Best Background Music at the 4th Kolkata Short International Film Festival, Best Cinematography at the 4th Delhi Short International Film Festival, Special Jury Mention at the 3rd Indian Cine Film Festival, and the Official Selection at the 4th Bangalore Shorts Film Festival and many more.
