= Highway (2015 film) =

2015 Indian film

- Theatrical release poster
- Directed by: Umesh Vinayak Kulkarni
- Written by: Girish Pandurang Kulkarni
- Produced by: Vinay Vaman Ganu
- Starring: Girish Kulkarni; Huma Qureshi; Renuka Shahane; Tisca Chopra; Mukta Barve; Sunil Barve; Nagraj Manjule; Shashank Shende; Shrikant Yadav; Kishor Kadam; Savita Prabhune
- Cinematography: Sudhakar Reddy Yakkanti
- Edited by: Paresh Kamdar
- Music by: Songs: Amit Trivedi; Background Score: Mangesh Dhakde
- Production company: Kharpoos Films
- Distributed by: Arbhaat Films
- Release date: 28 August 2015
- Running time: 135 minutes
- Country: India
- Language: Marathi

Highway (also known or stylized as 'हायवे एक Selfie आरपार.....!') is a 2015 Indian Marathi language road drama film produced by Vinay Vaman Ganu under Kharpoos Films banner and distributed by Arbhaat Films. Directed by Umesh Vinayak Kulkarni. The film marks Marathi debut of Bollywood actress Huma Qureshi and Tisca Chopra and newcomers Vrushali Kulkarni and Sameer Bhate. The film also debut of Bollywood music composer Amit Trivedi and singer Benny Dayal. The film has ensemble cast of Girish Kulkarni, Huma Qureshi, Renuka Shahane, Tisca Chopra, Mukta Barve, Sunil Barve, Nagraj Manjule, Shrikant Yadav, Kishor Kadam, Savita Prabhune, Vidhyadhar Joshi, Purva Pawar.

The story, screenplay and the dialogues were written by Girish Kulkarni. The soundtrack of the film is composed by Amit Trivedi and lyrics were penned by Vaibhav Joshi. Sudhakar Reddy is the film's cinematographer while the editing was done by Paresh Kamdar.

The film released in Maharashtra on 28 August 2015 and received highly positive reviews from critics, celebrities and public who praised the writing, direction and acting.

== Cast ==
- Girish Kulkarni
- Huma Qureshi
- Renuka Shahane
- Tisca Chopra
- Mukta Barve
- Sunil Barve
- Nagraj Manjule
- Kishor Kadam
- Savita Prabhune
- Shrikant Yadav
- Kishore Chougule
- Vidyadhar Joshi
- Mayur Khandge
- Vrishali Kulkarni
- Purva Pawar
- Chhaya Kadam
- Satish Alekar
- Shakuntal Nargekar
- Shashank Shende
- Nipun Dharmadhikari
- Vrushali Kulkarni
- Sameer Bhate
- Shubham
- Om Bhutkar

== Soundtrack ==
Highway

Soundtrack album by Amit Trivedi
- Released: 7 May 2015
- Genre: Feature film soundtrack
- Length: 11:44
- Language: Marathi
- Label: Zee Music Company

Amit Trivedi chronology
Guddu Rangeela (2015)	Highway (2015)	Shaandaar (2015)

The film's soundtrack was composed by composer Amit Trivedi; it was his debut Marathi soundtrack, the film also debut of Bollywood singer Benny Dayal while the background score has been composed by Mangesh Dhakde. The film's score consists of three tracks and all the lyrics are written by Vaibhav Joshi. The album rights of the film were acquired by Zee Music Company. The soundtrack was released on 7 May 2015.

Highway (Original Motion Picture Soundtrack)
No.	Title	Artist(s)	Length
1.	"Kangaroo"	Benny Dayal, Shalmali Kholgade (Additional Vocals: Girish Kulkarni and Vaibhav Joshi)	3:55
2.	"Kalandar"	Jasraj Jayant Joshi	4:23
3.	"Pinjade Wale"	Jasraj Jayant Joshi	3:30
Total length:			11:44

== Release ==
The film was first scheduled to be released on 24 July 2015 but due to technical issues the release was postponed. The film ended up releasing on 28 August 2015.

=== Marketing ===
The film's official first trailer was released on YouTube on 06 Aug 2015 and the second trailer followed on 10 Aug 2015.
