= Isha Keskar =

Indian Actress (born 1991)

- Born: 11 November 1991 (age 34); Pune, Maharashtra, India
- Education: Symbiosis College
- Occupation: Actress
- Years active: 2013–present
- Known for: Jai Malhar; Majhya Navaryachi Bayko; Lakshmichya Paulanni
- Partner(s): Rishi Saxena (2018–present)

Isha Keskar (born 11 November 1991) is an Indian film and television actress who works primarily in Marathi films. She is known for her lead roles in the Marathi series Jai Malhar, Majhya Navaryachi Bayko and Lakshmichya Paulanni.

== Early life ==
Isha Keskar is from Pune, Maharashtra. She completed her schooling from Sinhagad School in Pune, and she is a graduate in psychology from Symbiosis College, Pune.

== Career ==
Keskar began her career with the Marathi film We are On! Houn Jau Dya in 2013. The following year, she portrayed the character Banu in the popular mythological series Jai Malhar, which garnered significant acclaim. She also appeared in the well-known Marathi family drama series Majhya Navaryachi Bayko.

In 2023, she took on her first leading role in the film Sarla Ek Koti, starring alongside Onkar Bhojane and Chhaya Kadam.

== Filmography ==
=== Film ===
Year	Film	Role	Notes	Ref.
2013	We Are On! Houn Jau Dya		Debut	
2013	Nital	Darshana	Short film	
2016	A Short Scene About Waiting	Isha	Short film	
2016	Yala Jeevan Aise Naav			
2016	CRD	Dipti	Hindi film	
2019	Girlfriend	Kaveri		
2021	Pati, Patni, Aur Locket	Naina	Short film	
2022	Sher Shivraj	Saibai Rani Sarkar		
2023	Sarla Ek Koti	Sarla		
2024	Shivrayancha Chhava	Gojau		
2026	Sammarth	Suma		
2025	Love Sulabh †	TBA		

=== Television ===
Year	Title	Role	Channel	Ref.
2014–2017	Jai Malhar	Banu	Zee Marathi	
2018–2020	Majhya Navaryachi Bayko	Shanaya Sabnis	Zee Marathi	
2023–2025	Lakshmichya Paulanni	Kala Dinkar Khare / Kala Advait Chandekar	Star Pravah	

=== Web series ===
Year	Title	Role	Ref.
2018	Horn Ok Please	Gayatri	

== Personal life ==
Isha Keskar has been in a relationship with Rishi Saxena of Kahe Diya Pardes for the past few years. Their relationship became public in 2018 when Rishi shared a photo with Isha on his Instagram story. They first met while working on a TV show called Chala Hawa Yeu Dya. Isha liked Rishi's calmness when they first met. They started talking more at Zee Marathi Utsav Natyancha Awards ceremony, where Isha began the conversation.
