= Chhaya Kadam =

Indian actress

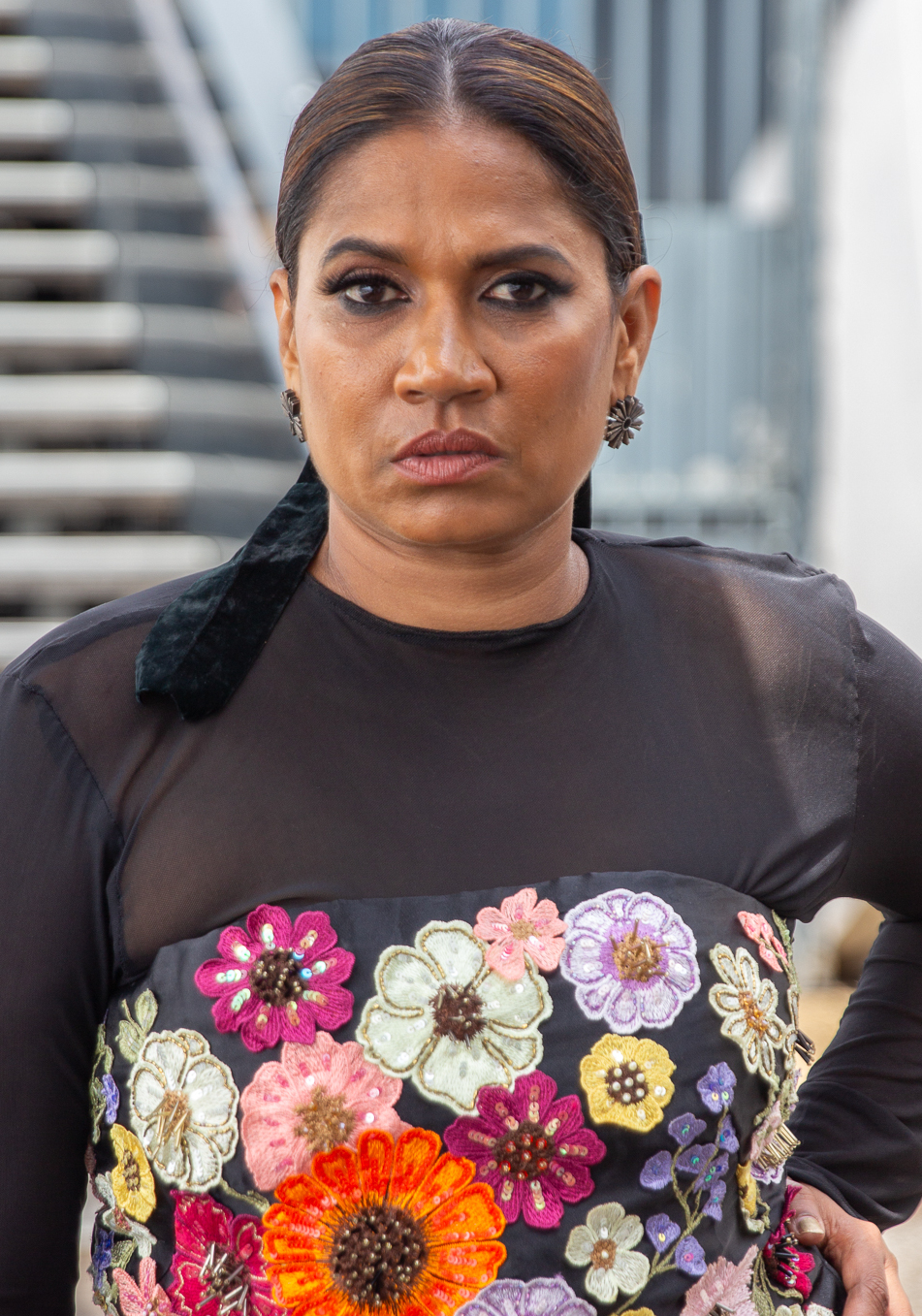
- Chhaya Kadam at 2024 Cannes Film Festival
- Born: 23 October 1975 (age 50); Mumbai, Maharashtra
- Occupation: Actress
- Years active: 2009–present

Chhaya Kadam (born 23 October 1975) is an Indian actress who predominantly appears in Marathi and Hindi films. She has appeared in Nagraj Manjule films, Fandry (2013), Sairat (2016), and Jhund (2022), as well as in other Marathi films including Redu (2018) and Nude (2018). The last of these earned her the Maharashtra State Film Award for Best Supporting Actress. Kadam gained wider recognition in 2024 for her roles in the comedy-dramas Laapataa Ladies and Madgaon Express and the independent drama All We Imagine as Light and Sister Midnight.

For her performance in the film Laapataa Ladies, she won the Filmfare Award for Best Supporting Actress.

== Early life ==
Chhaya Kadam was born into a middle-class family in Kalina, a suburb in central Mumbai. Her father was a mill worker. She has cited her father as one of the trustees of Sai Baba. On failing in the 12th grade, she said, "Success and failure come in life, but that is no reason to be discouraged. Because you get a second chance to prove yourself in life. But life doesn't come second. It is said that because of exam failure, some students resort to suicide". She attended Sathaye College, Vile Parle, where she played kabaddi at the state level, and graduated in Textile Design. She performed on stage throughout high school and college.

== Career ==
Chhaya began her career on stage before moving to film in 2009. Her debut on the stage was with Waman Kendre's Zulva. Her first film, Baimanus (2010), was never released. This was followed by films like Mi Sindhutai Sapkal (2010), Baboo Band Baaja (2011), and Kuni Ghar Deta Ka Ghar (2013). Her debut Hindi film was Singham Returns (2013), in which she had a single scene with Ajay Devgn.

Her breakthrough role came in Fandry (2013), directed by Nagraj Manjule. Her performance as Nani in the national award-winning film was critically acclaimed. She then appeared in Highway (2015) and Gour Hari Dastaan (2015).

In 2016, she starred in Nagraj Manjule's Sairat, their second collaboration. The film met with widespread critical acclaim. She portrayed a Hyderabadi Telugu woman who runs a dosa store in the film. She learned Telugu from the cameramen on the shoot for this. She received a nomination for the Filmfare Award for Best Supporting Actress – Marathi. Other films in 2016 were Babanchi Shala,Taleem, Vees Mhanje Vees, and Budhia Singh – Born to Run. She appeared in films like Atumgiri (2017), Halal (2017), and Hampi (2017).

In 2018, she starred in the film Nude, directed by Ravi Jadhav. Zee Studios, the production house for the film, ran into trouble at the International Film Festival of India in Goa. Despite being chosen as the opening title of the Indian Panorama section at the festival, the movie was dropped on the directives of the Information and Broadcasting Ministry. The Central Board of Film Certification finally approved the film with an Adult certificate and no cuts. Upon release, the film received critical acclaim, with Kadam receiving praise for her performance. The film went on to win the Best Film award at the New York Indian Film Festival 2018. She then starred in Redu, which was screened at many popular international film festivals and bagged several nominations at the 56th Maharashtra State Film Awards. She played an important role in Andhadhun (2018) and a major role in Zelya (2018).

In 2019, she starred in Aatpadi Nights. She received a nomination for the Filmfare Award for Best Supporting Actress – Marathi. She appeared in the web series Hutatma Season 2 and made her television debut in Mere Sai (2020).

In 2022, her first release Nay Varanbhat Loncha Kon Nay Koncha created controversy with the release of its trailer. The chairperson of the National Commission for Women (NCW) has written to the Ministry of Information and Broadcasting (I&B) requesting that the film's trailer be censored after receiving a complaint from Bharatiya Stree Shakti that the film's trailer "depicted women and minors in an offensive manner". Upon its release, the film won accolades for its realistic plot as well as applause for her performance. Kalpeshraj Kubal of Maharashtra Times wrote, "Chhaya Kadam, who is playing the role of Baye, has left us speechless with her acting skills. Her body language and verbal interactions add to the height of the role". She appeared in the drama Soyrik and played a prominent role. Her next two releases were the highly acclaimed Hindi films Gangubai Kathiawadi and Jhund. In the former, she portrayed Rashmibai, a rival of the titular character, played by Alia Bhatt. The latter marked her third collaboration with Nagraj Manjule. She played the wife of Amitabh Bachchan's character, Vijay Borade. Both roles gained her recognition. Kaun Pravin Tambe?, Bharat Maza Desh Aaze, and Yere Yera Pausa. were among the year's other films. She next appeared in Kiran Rao's Laapataa Ladies.

Her upcoming film is Rupesh Paul's neo noir experimental Pedigree (2023), supposedly the first silent Indian film after the post sound era.

== Filmography ==
Key
†	Denotes films that have not yet been released

Year	Film	Role	Language	Notes	Ref
2009	Patacha Pani	Chhaya	Marathi	Short	
2009	Vitthal	Vitthal's mother	Marathi	Short	
2010	Dagadancha Dev (Kingdom of God)		Marathi	Short	
2010	Baimanus		Marathi		
2010	Mee Sindhutai Sapkal	Sindhutai's mother-in-law	Marathi		
2011	Baboo Band Baaja		Marathi		
2012	Nach Tuzach Lagin Haay	Milind's wife	Marathi		
2012	Aayna Ka Bayna	Chuttan's mother	Marathi		
2013	Kuni Ghar Deta Ka Ghar	Kunal's friend	Marathi		
2013	Singham Returns	Slum Dweller	Hindi		
2013	Fandry	Nani	Marathi		
2015	Highway		Marathi		
2015	Gour Hari Dastaan	Khadi Commission	Hindi		
2016	Babanchi Shala	Neeta Satam	Marathi		
2016	Sairat	Suman Akka	Marathi		
2016	Vees Mhanje Vees	Zampya's mother	Marathi		
2016	Budhia Singh – Born to Run	Minister of Child Welfare	Hindi		
2016	Shirpa	Milind's wife	Marathi		
2016	Taleem	Bhau's mother	Marathi		
2017	Atumgiri	Uttam's wife	Marathi		
2017	Halal	Halim's mother	Marathi		
2017	Hampi	Ashabai	Marathi		
2018	Zelya	Zelya's mother	Marathi		
2018	Nude	Chandrakka	Marathi		
2018	Redu	Chhaya	Marathi		
2018	Wagherya	Anna's wife	Marathi		
2018	Andhadhun	Sakhu Kaur	Hindi		
2019	Bombay Rose	Bar Dancer	Marathi		
2019	Rom Com	Rahul's mother	Marathi		
2019	Satellite Shankar	Mahesh's mother	Hindi		
2019	Aatpadi Nights	Laxmi Khatmode	Marathi		
2019	Hutatma Season 2	Bhimabai Naik	Marathi	Web series	
2020	Kesari	Balram's mother	Marathi		
2020	Online Guru	Ragini Kadam	Marathi		
2020	Mere Sai - Shraddha Aur Saburi	Bai	Hindi	TV Series	
2021	Antim: The Final Truth	Dhurpi Patil	Hindi		
2021	Bigg Boss Marathi (season 3)	Herself	Marathi	Special appearance	
2022	Nay Varanbhat Loncha Kon Nay Koncha	Bay Bikaji Chalke	Marathi		
2022	Soyrik	Police Officer	Marathi		
2022	Gangubai Kathiawadi	Rashmibai	Hindi		
2022	Jhund	Ranjana Borade, Vijay Borade's Wife	Hindi		
2022	Kaun Pravin Tambe?	Jyothi Tambe	Hindi		
2022	Yere Yera Pausa	Salman's mother	Marathi		
2022	Bharat Maza Desh Aahe	Sonu's grandmother	Marathi		
2023	Sarla Ek Koti	Mathura Vakhre	Marathi		
2023	Pachuvum Athbutha Vilakkum	Nani	Malayalam		
2023	Safed	Amma	Hindi		
2024	Laapataa Ladies	Manju Mai	Hindi		
2024	Madgaon Express	Kanchan Kombdi	Hindi		
2024	Bardovi	Akka	Hindi		
2024	All We Imagine as Light	Parvaty	Malayalam/ Hindi		
2024	Sister Midnight	Sheetal	English		
2024	Snow Flower	Nanda	Marathi		
2025	Sa La Te Sa La Na Te	Police Officer	Marathi		
2025	Ek Chatur Naar	Radha	Hindi		
2026	Bhootam Bhayyam	Jathai	Marathi		
2026	Gandhari	Uma Didi	Hindi		
2026	Bandkhor	Usha	Marathi		
2027	Maharagni: Queen of Queens †	TBA	Hindi		
2027	Khashaba †	TBA	Marathi		
2027	Privacy †	TBA	Hindi		

== Awards and nominations ==
Year	Work	Award	Category	Result	Ref
2016	Sairat	Filmfare Awards Marathi	Filmfare Award for Best Supporting Actress – Marathi	Nominated	
2016	Sairat	Maharashtracha Favourite Kon?	MFK Award for Favourite Supporting Actress	Nominated	
2018	Nude	Maharashtracha Favourite Kon?	MFK Award for Favourite Supporting Actress	Nominated	
2018	Nude	Maharashtra State Film Awards	Best Supporting Actress	Won	
2019	Redu	Maharashtra State Film Awards	Special Jury Award	Won	
2020	Aatpadi Nights	Filmfare Awards Marathi	Filmfare Award for Best Supporting Actress – Marathi	Nominated	
2025	Laapataa Ladies	Filmfare Awards	Filmfare Award for Best Supporting Actress	Won	
