= Cinderella (2015 Indian film) =

- Directed by: Kiran Nakti
- Written by: Kiran Nakti
- Screenplay by: Kiran nakti
- Story by: Aaditya Halbe Kiran Nakti
- Produced by: Krupasindhi Pictures
- Starring: Atharva Nakti; Rupesh Bane; Yashashwi Wengurlekar; Mangesh Desai; Janardan Parab; Yakub Sayed; Vineet Bhonde
- Cinematography: Raaja Phadatare
- Edited by: Ashish Mhatre; Apurva Motiwale
- Music by: Pankaj Padghan
- Release date: 4 December 2015
- Running time: 118 minutes
- Country: India
- Language: Marathi

Cinderella (Marathi: सिंड्रेला) is a 2015 Indian Marathi language drama film directed by Kiran Nakti and produced by Anjali Avinash Joshi. It is Nakti's debut as a film director. The film stars Rupesh Bane, Yashaswi Vengurlekar, Mangesh Desai and Sajida Khan in lead roles and was released on 4 December 2015 in India.

== Premise ==
The film is based on the story of two orphan children from the slum area of Mumbai.

== Cast ==
- Atharva Nakti
- Rupesh Bane
- Yashaswi Vengurlekar
- Mangesh Desai
- Janardan Parab
- Yakub Sayed
- Vineet Bhonde

== Soundtrack ==
Cinderella

Soundtrack album by Pankaj Padghan, Kiran Vehale & Gaurav Murkar
- Released: 27 November 2015
- Genre: Feature film soundtrack
- Length: 17:44
- Language: Marathi
- Label: Zee Music Company
External audio
- Audio Jukebox on YouTube

The soundtrack of Cinderella consists of 5 songs, of which 3 were composed by Kiran Vehale - Gaurav Murkar while 2 were composed by Pankaj Padghan.

Tracklist
No.	Title	Lyrics	Music	Singer(s)	Length
1.	"Deva" (Sad)	Omkar Mangesh Datta	Pankaj Padghan	Aarya Ambekar	03:36
2.	"Tapori"	Niket Chaudhari	Kiran Vehale - Gaurav Murkar	Rohit Raut	03:41
3.	"Govinda"		Kiran Vehale- Gaurav Murkar	Nandesh Umap	03:37
4.	"Dilachi Rani"	Murlidhar Gode	Kiran Vehale - Gaurav Murkar	Anand Shinde	03:31
5.	"Deva Kasa Re" (Happy)	Omkar Mangesh Datta	Pankaj Padghan	Aarya Ambekar	03:34
Total length:					17:44

== Critical reception ==
Marathi Cineyug gave the film a rating of 3 out of 5 saying that, "‘Cinderella’ is a story of courage and overcoming the hardship of being poor, but still dreaming of a better life and being happy all the time. Above all this is a story of fulfilling one’s dreams through all hardship, a real Cinderella moment." Rasik Tirodkar of Marathi Stars gave the film a rating of 2 out of 5 saying that, "It can for the most parts be labelled as poverty porn. Melodrama in addition to some weak acting makes this film a pretty bad watch."
