= Sanju Rathod =

Indian singer and songwriter

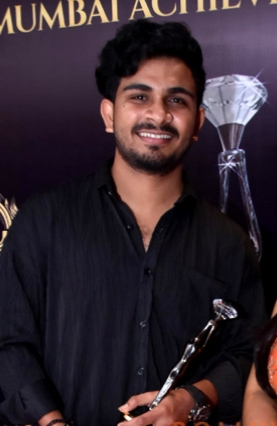
- Rathod in 2024
- Born: 24 November 1998 (age 27); Dhanwad, Jalgaon district, Maharashtra, India
- Occupations: Singer; songwriter; composer; lyricist
- Musical career
- Origin: Maharashtra, India
- Genres: Marathi–pop, Banjara Folk; Contemporary pop; Afrobeats; Indie pop
- Years active: 2017–present
- Label: Independent

Sanju Rathod (Marathi pronunciation: [səɲd͡ʒuː raːʈʰoːɖ]; born 24 November 1998), is an Indian singer, songwriter, composer, and lyricist primarily known for his work in the Marathi music industry. He gained widespread recognition with his viral 2024 hit "Gulabi Sadi," followed by popular tracks like "Shaky", "Kali Bindi", "Bangles" and "Sundari". Rathod's music fuses traditional Marathi folk with contemporary pop, Afrobeats, and indie sounds, attracting a massive following among younger audiences.

== Early life ==
Sanju Rathod was born on 24 November 1998 in Dhanwad village, Jalgaon district, Maharashtra, into a Banjara family. His father is a farmer and his mother is a homemaker. He initially studied mechanical engineering before developing an interest in music during his college years. Inspired by artists such as Honey Singh, he began writing and performing rap songs, with his passion for music partly influenced by personal experiences. In 2017, Rathod left college and moved to Mumbai to pursue a career in music, overcoming financial difficulties, family opposition, and criticism during his early journey.

== Career ==
Rathod started his music career with independent releases, beginning with devotional tracks dedicated to Ganpati Bappa, which garnered 10–15 million views on YouTube each year. His other songs "Chamiya", "Style Martay", "Jhumka" also went popular. His breakthrough came with "Nauvari Pahije" in May 2023, a vibrant single picturised with Prajakta Ghag that surpassed 200 million YouTube views and won the "Favorite Song (Non-film)" award at the 14th Maharashtracha Favourite Kon?.

In 2024, Rathod achieved nationwide fame with "Gulabi Sadi" (transl. Pink Saree), released on 6 February as a sequel to "Nauvari Pahije". The song's catchy melody, vibrant lyrics, and music video—directed by Rathod and featuring Prajakta Ghag—went viral, inspiring over 5 million Instagram reels. Celebrities like Madhuri Dixit, Remo D'Souza joined the trend. The track marked the first Marathi song to be displayed on New York's Times Square and received praise from international artists in Pakistan, Bangladesh, and Indian rappers like Divine and Badshah. Rathod appeared on "Superstar Singer 3" with Neha Kakkar.

In October 2024, Rathod made history as the first Marathi singer to open for Alan Walker's Sunburn Arena concert, representing regional music on an international stage. Rathod's 2025 release "Shaky", featuring Bigg Boss fame Isha Malviya, debuted on 22 April and quickly topped YouTube's Top 100 Music Videos Global chart. Blending Marathi folk with Afrobeats, it garnered over 100 million views and 3.4 million Instagram reels. Rathod revealed plans for its potential inclusion in a Bollywood film, highlighting his growing crossover appeal.

Rathod's next single, "Sundari", featuring Yashika Jatav, was released on 11 September 2025 at YouTube fanfest 2025. It gained massive attention, garnering over 4.47 crore views on YouTube within its first month. In April 2026, he released "Bangles" his second collaboration with Isha Malviya after their earlier work on "Shaky".

== Discography ==
=== Notable singles ===
| Year | Song Title | Notable Details | Ref. |
|---|---|---|---|
| 2023 | "Nauvari Pahije" | Over 20 million YouTube views; won Maharashtracha Favourite Kon? award | |
| 2024 | "Gulabi Sadi" | Viral Marathi hit; popular dance number. | |
| 2025 | "Shaky" | Featured Isha Malviya; topped global YouTube charts. Directed by Himanshu Dhar, the music video has garnered nearly 850 Million views on just the official You Tube link of Sanju. | |
| 2025 | "Sundari" | Featured Yashika Jatav. Directed by Himanshu Dhar, the music video has garnered nearly 270 Million views on just the official You Tube link of Sanju. | |
| 2026 | "Bangles" | | |

== Awards and nominations ==
| Year | Award | Category | Nominated work | Result | Ref. |
|---|---|---|---|---|---|
| 2024 | Maharashtracha Favourite Kon? | Favorite Non-film song | "Nauvari Pahije" | Won | |
| 2024 | Indian Independent Music Awards (IIMA) | Best Marathi song | "Gulabi Sadi" | Won | |
| 2024 | Indian Independent Music Awards (IIMA) | Best Song – Independent | "Gulabi Sadi" | Won | |
