= Building for the Future =

- Film poster
- Directed by: John Owen
- Written by: Gautam Pemmaraju
- Produced by: Vidhi Kasliwal
- Production company: Landmarc Films
- Release date: 11 April 2013
- Running time: 13 minutes 34 seconds
- Country: India

Building for the Future is a 2013 Indian documentary film about the design, engineering and construction of the tallest building in India – The Palais Royale.

This documentary film has been directed by John Michael Owen. It has been produced by Vidhi Kasliwal. Gautam Pemmaraju is the writer of the film. Grafik Fever has worked on the VFX in the film.

This documentary film is a Landmarc films presentation.

It won Best VFX at the 4th Indian Advertising & Corporate Film Festival – 15.
