= Sanngto Aika =

- Directed by: Satish Rajwade
- Written by: Parag Kulkarni
- Produced by: Vidhi Kasliwal
- Starring: Sachin Pilgaonkar; Vaibhav Mangle; Milind Shinde; Bhalchandra Kadam
- Cinematography: Suhas Gujrathi
- Music by: Avinash–Vishwajeet
- Production company: Landmarc Films
- Release date: 2 October 2014; (Maharashtra)
- Running time: 132 minutes
- Country: India
- Language: Marathi

Sanngto Aika (transl. Hear Me Out) is a 2014 Indian Marathi-language film, written by Parag Kulkarni and directed by Satish Rajwade, based on a social issue. The film was released on 2 October 2014 all over Maharashtra. It was the debut film of television actress Sanskruti Balgude, alongside Sachin Pilgaonkar, Bhau Kadam, Vaibhav Mangle. The film was produced and presented by Vidhi Kasliwal and Landmarc Films.

== Plot ==
A drunkard stand up comedian finds himself all alone at the crossroads of life when he is entangled by political stooges to take the fall for a crime he has not committed. His loving wife and 6-year-old son feel let down by him, this incites the drunkard to use his presence of mind and sheer wit to try and emerge a hero in their eyes.

== Cast ==
- Sachin Pilgaonkar as Ambatrao Gholap
- Vaibhav Mangle as Constable Palav
- Bhau Kadam as PSI Kharade
- Milind Shinde as Jhunjharrao aka Bhau
- Jagannath Nivangune as Vikramrao aka Nana
- Pooja Sawant as Kshitija
- Sanskruti Balgude as Mohini
- Madhav Abhyankar as Prataprao
- Atul Kaswa as Sarjerao
- Master Shubam Parab as Kisna
- Vijay Chavan as Shastri

== Production ==
Sanngto Aika has brought together for the first time two popular personalities of the Marathi Film industry: actor-film maker Sachin Pilgaonkar and director Satish Rajwade. The lead cast of this film is headed by Sachin Pilgaonkar, Bhau Kadam, Vaibhav Mangle, Jagannath Nivangune, Milind Shinde, Pooja Sawant, Madhav Abhyankar, Sanskruti Balgude, and Marathi stalwart Vijay Chavan. Story & screenplay is by Parag Kulkarni, dialogues by Sanjay Pawar, and Suhas Gujrathi is the director of photography. Art direction is by Nikhil Kovale and music by Avinash Vishwajeet. The film is directed by Satish Rajwade, who has given many back-to-back successful films like Premachi Goshta and Mumbai-Pune-Mumbai among others. Producer Vidhi Kasliwal has been associated with the Indian film industry for several years and has worked under Sooraj R. Barjatya, as director & producer for Rajshri Productions on several films. Kasliwal had previously worked as an associate director for the films Vivah, and Ek Vivaah... Aisa Bhi, and has written and directed the youth based film Isi Life Mein in 2010.

== Soundtrack ==
Sanngto Aika

Soundtrack album by Avinash-Vishwajeet
- Released: September 2014
- Genre: Feature film soundtrack
- Length: 18:44
- Language: Marathi
- Label: Landmarc Films

Avinash-Vishwajeet chronology
Guru Purnima (2014)	Sanngto Aika (2014)	Ishq Wala Love (2014)

The songs were composed by Avinash-Vishwajeet with lyrics by Guru Thakur, Shrirang Godbole and Damyanti Wagh.

No.	Title	Singer(s)	Lyricist	Length
1	"Datale Abhaal" (Duet Version)	Sonu Nigam, Bela Shende	Damyanti Wagh	4:25
2	"Fantastic" (Lavani)	Urmila Dhangar	Guru Thakur	3:38
3	"Datale Abhaal" (Male Version)	Sonu Nigam	Damyanti Wagh	4:23
4	"Fu Bai Fu"	Sachin Pilgaonkar	Shrirang	3:48
5	"Datale Abhaal" (Female Version)	Bela Shende	Damyanti Wagh	3:10
