= Shrikant Yadav =

Indian actor

Shrikant Mohan Yadav
- Born: Shrikant Mohan Yadav; Pune, Maharashtra, India
- Occupation: Actor

Shrikant Mohan Yadav is a film actor. He is known for Marathi films such as Badha,Valu (The Wild Bull), Vihir, Deool, Ajoba, Masala, Pune 52, Killa, Half Ticket, Faster Fene, Chiththi, Nude, Mauli, Trijya, Dhoorala, Bhirkit, Hutspa Zala Re, Dagadi Chal 2, Har Har Mahadev, Baghatos Kay Mujara Kar, Poster Girl, Highway, Night School, Vartul, ILU ILU, Dithi,Ek Hazarachi Note, Highway, Jaundya Na Balasaheb

Hindi: Umrika, Daddy, Aajji, Bhonsale, Section 375, Jalsa, Munjya

Web series: Breath 1, Inside Edge 3, Broken News 1, Broken News 2, Lust Stories-2

His performance in Marathi films Deool, Ajoba and Jaundya Na Balasaheb has been widely appreciated.

== Filmography ==
- Section 375 (2019)
- Lathe Joshi (2018)
- Faster Fene (2017)
- Baghtos Kay Mujra Kar (2017)
- Jaundya Na Balasaheb (2016)
- Half Ticket (2016)
- Highway (2015)
- Killa (2015)
- Ek Hazarachi Note (2014)
- Ajoba (2014)
- Pune 52 (2013)
- Night school (2012)
- Vihir (2009)
- Bhirkit (2022)
- Daagadi Chawl 2 (2022)
- Lust Stories 2 (2023)
- Ilu Ilu 1998 (2025)
- Gaav Bolavato (2025)
- Ata Thambaycha Naay! (2025)
- Ambat Shaukin (2025)
