= Ilu Ilu 1998 =

Indian Marathi romantic drama film

- Promotional poster
- Marathi: इलू इलू 1998
- Directed by: Ajinkya Phalke
- Written by: Nitin Supekar
- Produced by: Balasaheb Phalke; Hindavi Phalke
- Starring: Elli AvrRam; Nishant Bhavsar; Mira Jagannath; Shrikant Yadav; Veena Jamkar
- Cinematography: Yogesh Koli
- Edited by: Nitesh Rathod
- Music by: Rohit Nagbhide; Vijay Narayan Gavande
- Production company: Phalke Films Entertainment Productions
- Release date: 31 January 2025
- Country: India
- Language: Marathi

Ilu Ilu 1998 is a 2025 Indian Marathi-language romantic drama film directed by Ajinkya Phalke. Produced by Balasaheb Phalke and Hindavi Phalke under the banner of Phalke Films Entertainment Productions, the film features Elli AvrRam (in her Marathi debut), Nishant Bhavsar, Mira Jagannath, Shrikant Yadav and Veena Jamkar. The story follows a 14-year-old boy who develops his first crush on his modern English teacher, and in his effort to impress her, he faces an unexpected twist when a sketch of her is found in the school toilet, changing the course of events.

== Cast ==
- Elli AvrRam as Ms. Pinto
- Nishant Bhavsar as Aniket Surve
- Mira Jagannath as Hema Desai
- Shrikant Yadav as Milind Surve
- Veena Jamkar as Sangeeta Surve
- Ankita Lande as Nisha Dekhane
- Gaurav Kalushte as Ashish Surve
- Yash Sanas as Chikya
- Soham Kalokhe as Lalya
- Aarya Kakade as Joshi
- Siddhesh Lingayat as Rakshash
- Ananda Karekar as Pawar sir
- Vanita Kharat as Jadhav bai
- Kamlakar Satpute as Jadhav saheb
- Aroh Welankar
- Anushka Pimputkar

== Production ==
The film was announced on 2 December 2024, with a motion poster revealing the cast names, although the lead actress's name was not disclosed. It marks Swedish Greek actress Elli AvrRam's debut in the Marathi film industry. The film's teaser was released on 16 December 2024, unveiling AvrRam in the lead role.

== Soundtrack ==
Track listing
No.	Title	Lyrics	Music	Singer(s)	Length
1.	"Ilu Ilu – Title track"	Prashant Madpuwar	Rohit Nagbhide	Arya Ambekar	2:28
2.	"Gulabi Gulabi"	Vaibhav Joshi	Rohit Nagbhide	Avadhoot Gupte	4:53
3.	"Hasane Tujhe"	Vaibhav Deshmukh	Vijay Narayan Gavande	Padmanabh Gaikwad	4:06
Total length:					11:27

== Release ==
The film was released in theaters on 31 January 2025.
