= Landmarc Films =

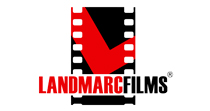
- Company type: Public
- Industry: Entertainment
- Founded: Mumbai, Maharashtra, India (2011)
- Founder: Vidhi Kasliwal
- Headquarters: Mumbai, Maharashtra, India
- Key people: Vidhi Kasliwal; K.R.Mahadevan (Mohan); Deepak Nangalia
- Products: Film Distribution; Film Production
- Website: Landmarc Films

Landmarc Films is a film production company founded by Vidhi Kasliwal, as a division of Landmarc Leisure Corporation Limited [LLCL]. The company's headquarters are located in Mumbai, India.

== Productions ==
=== Documentaries ===
- Block by Block (2011)
- Memories of Prem Ratan Dhan Payo (2015)
- Building for the Future (2013)
- That's What It's All About (2017)
- Vidyoday (2018)

=== Marathi films ===
- Sanngto Aika (2014)
- Vazandar (2016)
- Ringan (2017)
- Gachchi (2017)
- Redu (2018)
- Pipsi (2018)
- Nashibvaan (2019)
- Medium Spicy (2022)
