= Redu (film) =

- Directed by: Sagar Chhaya Vanjari
- Written by: Sanjay Navgire
- Produced by: Vidhi Kasliwal; Navalkishor Sarda
- Starring: Shashank Shende; Chhaya Kadam; Gauri Konge; Vinamra Bhabal; Mrunmayi Supal
- Cinematography: Mangesh Gadekar
- Edited by: Sagar Chhaya Vanjari
- Music by: Vijay Narayan Gavande
- Production company: Landmarc Films
- Release date: 18 May 2018; Theatrical - All over Maharashtra
- Running time: 110 minutes
- Country: India
- Languages: Marathi-Malvani with English Subtitles

Redu (also called The Radio) is a 2018 Marathi-Malvani language Indian film directed by Sagar Chhaya Vanjari and produced by Navalkishor Sarda and Vidhi Kasliwal. The film stars Shashank Shende and Chhaya Kadam in lead roles. A Landmarc Films Presentation and a Naval Films Production in association with Blink Motion Pictures, Redu was released in theatres on 18 May 2018 after a successful run in National & International Film Festivals.

== Plot ==
Redu is the story of Tatu and his family living in a humble village in Konkan, set in the early 1970s. Tatu, a short-tempered, irate middle-aged simpleton, is fascinated and curious to see a ‘redu’, a small portable radio, for the first time in his life.

Fortunate circumstances allow him to possess a ‘redu’. The gadget makes his ordinary life full of excitement and fun. People in his village start looking at him in a different light, raising his status. Tatu gets very attached to this ‘redu’, the newest member of his family, and everything it brings with it. A sudden loss of his prized possession leaves Tatu disheartened and dejected. Refusing to accept this altered reality, Tatu embarks on a quest to reclaim what once belonged to him. Redu is a humorous bittersweet story of one man's life, love, values, and his will to go on despite the odds, set against the backdrop of rural Konkan.

== Cast ==
- Shashank Shende as Tatu
- Chhaya Kadam as Chhaya
- Gauri Konge as Suman
- Vinamra Bhabal as Baban
- Runmayi Supal as Saru

== Soundtrack ==
Redu 2018

Soundtrack album by Vijay Narayan Gavande
- Released: May 2018
- Genre: Film soundtrack
- Length: 12:18
- Label: Landmarc Films

The songs were composed by Vijay Narayan Gavande with lyrics by Gavande and Guru Thakur.

No.	Title	Singer(s)	Lyricist	Length
1	"Dewak Kalaji Re"	Ajay Gogavale	Guru Thakur	4:51
2	"Karkarta Kawlo"	Amita Ghugari, Pravin Kumar	Vijay Narayan Gavande	4:29
3	"Kukur Kukur" (Malvan Express)	Manish Rajgire	Guru Thakur	2:58

== Critical reception ==
Mihir Bhanage of The Times of India gave the film a 3.5 out of 5 ratings, saying that Redu warms up with a light-hearted approach and gradually develops into an emotionally rewarding experience. Though the film is in Malvani, the language doesn't act as a barrier. This one is definitely worth a watch.

Just a couple of weeks prior to its release, Redu won Best Film, Best Director, Best Actor and four more Maharashtra State Awards.

== Accolades ==
Year	Ceremony	Category	Result	Ref.
2017	56th Maharashtra State Film Award	Maharashtra State Film Award for Best Film	Won	
2017	56th Maharashtra State Film Award	Maharashtra State Film Award for Best Actor	Won	
