= Ram Dass (disambiguation) =

Ram Dass (1931–2019) was a contemporary American spiritual teacher and former academic who wrote the 1971 bestseller Be Here Now.

Ramdass, Ram Dass or Ram Das may also refer to:

== People ==
- Swami Ramdas (born Vittal Rao) (1884–1963), Indian saint, philosopher, philanthropist, and pilgrim
- Guru Ram Das (1534–1581), fourth of the ten founding Gurus of Sikhism
- Samarth Ramdas or Samartha Ramdas Swami, 17th century Indian Hindu saint, philosopher, writer and spiritual master
- Kancherla Gopanna or Bhakta Ramadasu (1620–1680), Indian devotee of Lord Rama and composer of Carnatic music
- Ramdas Rupla Gavit, Indian politician
- S. A. Ramadas, Indian politician

== Fictional ==
- Ram Dass, a character in the 1888 book A Little Princess by Frances Hodgson Burnett, and several adaptations of it
- Ram-Dass, a fictional mecha in the 2006 anime Strain: Strategic Armored Infantry
- Ramadasa and Vijayan, fictional characters in a series of Indian films

== Other uses ==
- 1947 Ramdas ship disaster, when SS Ramdas sank off the coast of Mumbai
- Ramdass, a city and municipal council in Amritsar district in the Indian state of Punjab
  - Ashley Ramdass
  - Ryan Ramdass
- Ramdaspur, historic name of Amritsar, Punjab, India
