= Gulabi Sadi =

2024 Marathi song by Sanju Rathod

- Official song cover

Single by Sanju Rathod
- Language: Marathi
- Written: November 10, 2023
- Released: February 6, 2024
- Venue: Apostrophe Studios
- Genre: Indie folk; pop
- Length: 3:45
- Songwriter: Sanju Rathod
- Composer: Sanju Rathod
- Producer: G-Spark (Gaurav Rathod)

Sanju Rathod singles chronology
"Bappa Wala Gana 5.0" (2023)	"Gulabi Sadi" (2024)	"Bappa Wala Gana 6.0" (2024)

Music video
- Gulabi Sadi on YouTube

"Gulabi Sadi" (transl. Pink Saree) is a Marathi-language song by Indian singer Sanju Rathod. It became a viral hit due to its catchy melody, vibrant lyrics, and lively music video featuring Sanju Rathod and Prajakta Ghag. The music was produced by G-Spark, while composition and lyrics were handled by Sanju Rathod.

Gulabi Sadi has been recreated for Dhamaal 4, retaining its original melody while featuring a new musical arrangement by Tanishk Bagchi and new Hindi lyrics by Kumaar.

== Background and release ==
"I didn't have anyone specific in mind when I wrote this song—it's really for all women. My mom really loves pink, and that inspired me too. I wanted to make something that would appeal to a lot of people. I usually come up with the melody first—it's in my head as I write—and the lyrics follow that rhythm."

— Sanju Rathod, during an interview with ABP Majha

The lyrics was written and composed by Sanju Rathod and produced by G-Spark. In an interview with Sakal, Sanju Rathod said that he wrote the song Gulabi Sadi on the morning of Diwali in 2023. "I was thinking what to do. For some reason, I didn't even go home for Diwali. Sitting alone, that question kept haunting me – what should I do? Then I felt that I should try to create something new. I thought that the symbol of love is often the color pink and at that time, "Nauvari Sari" was the only such song. So I thought, why not make a sequel to Nauvari Sari? That's when I came up with Gulabi Sadi," Rathod explained.

"Gulabi Sadi" was released as a single on 6 February 2024, through various music platforms. The song's music video, directed by Sanju Rathod, was uploaded to YouTube on the same day. G-Spark served as the mixing engineer and Jackie Vanjari as the mastering engineer.

== Credits ==
Credits adapted from YouTube.

- Singer: Sanju Rathod, G-Spark
- Lyrics: Sanju Rathod
- Composer: Sanju Rathod, G-Spark
- Music producer: G-Spark (Gaurav Rathod)
- Mixing engineer: G-Spark
- Mastering engineer: Jackie Vanjari
- Choreographer: Akash Rathod, Archit W.
- Cinematographer: Suraj Rajput

== Music video ==
The music video for "Gulabi Sadi" features Sanju Rathod and Prajakta Ghag. The song depicts a girl dressed in a pink saree with red lipstick. She is telling the man to click her photos since she looks beautiful.

== Reception and impact ==
The song achieved significant success, both in India and internationally, became a social media sensation. Sanju Rathod, in an interview with The Times of India, expressed surprise at the song's global reach, noting that artists from Pakistan and Bangladesh, as well as Indian rappers like Divine and Badshah, praised the track. He also mentioned that the people have created multiple versions of the song in various Indian languages. It is a first Marathi song display on New York's Times Square. The song topped YouTube charts in India garnered 300 million views on the platform. It become the most streamed Marathi song on Spotify with over 50 million streams and later became first Marathi independent song to cross 100 million streams. As of June 2025, the song crossed 431 million views on YouTube.

The song became a sensation on Instagram, inspiring more than 3.7 million reels, including celebrities like Madhuri Dixit and Remo D'Souza recreated the hook step. The popular hook step was recreated by the IPL team Mumbai Indians along with influencer Karan Sonawane, which went viral on social media. It was also performed by several film and television personalities, including Bhagyashree, Prarthana Behere, Mawra Hocane, Adah Sharma,. Akshara Singh, Anusha Dandekar, Munmun Dutta, Shweta Shinde, Rupali Ganguly, Nakuul Mehta, and Drashti Dhami. Hindustan Times ranked the song second in their list of the Top 10 Indie songs of 2024, describing "Gulabi Sadi" as "a melodic masterpiece grounded in folk traditions." The track was performed live by Rathod at various events, including award functions, singing reality shows and IPL matches. In December 2024, Indian playback singer Asha Bhosle performed "Gulabi Sadi" in her live concert in Dubai.

== Awards ==
Year	Award	Category	Nominee	Result	Ref.
2024	Indian Independent Music Awards (IIMA)	Best Marathi song	Sanju Rathod	Won	
2024	Indian Independent Music Awards (IIMA)	Best Song – Independent	Sanju Rathod	Won	
