= Vidhi Kasliwal =

Indian filmmaker

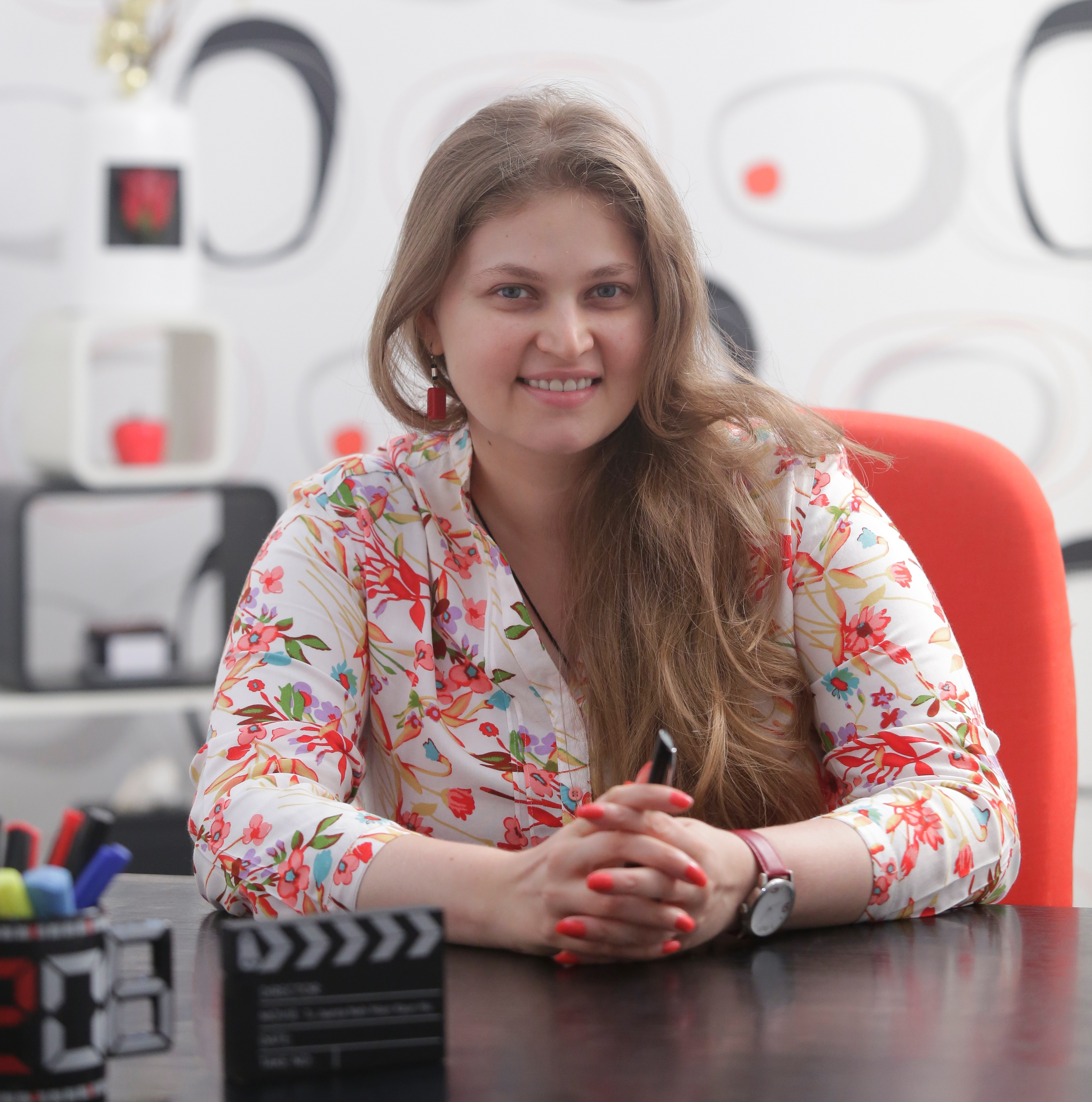
- Occupations: film director; producer
- Years active: 2016–present
- Website: designershawrup.blogspot.com

Vidhi Kasliwal is an Indian film director and producer, as well as the founder and CEO of Landmarc Films. She has a background with Rajshri Productions, where she wrote and produced documentaries and served as an assistant to directors Sooraj R. Barjatya, and Kaushik Ghatak.

== Early life and education ==
Kasliwal grew up in Mumbai and is the eldest of four siblings. She went to Villa Theresa High School and has a Bachelor of Commerce degree from the Sydenham College of Commerce and Economics. She also underwent the Creative Producer's Program at the UCLA Film School.

== Career ==
Kasliwal worked as an assistant at Rajshri Productions, and was part of the crew for Vivah (2006) and Ek Vivaah... Aisa Bhi (2008). She wrote and directed Isi Life Mein...!, a film produced by Rajshri Productions and released in 2010.

She also produced the 2014 Marathi film Sanngto Aika starring Sachin Pilgaonkar, the documentary Block by Block about the lives of building workers at one of the biggest construction sites in India, and the corporate film Building For The Future about next-generation architecture and engineering in India.

She was the producer and director of the 2018 documentary Vidyoday, which is about a Digambar Jain monk.

The Marathi film Vazandar directed by Sachin Kundalkar was produced by her company Landmarc Films. Other projects include Ringan (2017), Gachchi (2017), and Redu (2018)
