= Nauvari Pahije =

- Official song cover

Single by Sanju Rathod
- Language: Marathi
- Released: May 2, 2023
- Studio: Apostrophe Studios
- Genre: Indie pop; Indian pop
- Length: 3:42 (audio track); 3:45 (music video)
- Songwriter: Sanju Rathod
- Composer: Sanju Rathod
- Producer: G-Spark (Gaurav Rathod)

Sanju Rathod singles chronology
"Bolo Jay Sevalal" (2023)	"Nauvari Pahije" (2023)	"Bulletwali" (2023)

Music video
- Nauvari Pahije on YouTube

"Nauvari Pahije" (transl. Want a Nauvari) is a 2023 Indian Marathi-language song by Sanju Rathod, with music produced by G-Spark. The track features Sanju Rathod and Prajakta Ghag. It was released on 2 May 2023 and quickly become a viral hit, later winning the "Favorite Song (Non-film)" award at the 14th MFK Awards.

== Credits ==
Credits adapted from YouTube.

- Sanju Rathod – composer, lyricist and singer
- Manish Mahajan – director, screenplay writer, choreographer
- G-Spark (Gaurav Rathod) – producer, mix
- Jackie Vanjari – master
- Naresh More – choreographer
- Jagdish Bhandge – recording
- Abhinav Nair – additional rhythm
- Suraj Rajput – cinematography, editor

== Music video ==
The music video is a production of Bramhastra Records and directed by Manish Mahajan, who also handles the screenplay. Choreography are executed by Naresh More and Manish Mahajan. The song was picturised on Sanju Rathod and Prajakta Ghag.

== Reception ==
In June 2023, the song surpassed 20 million views on YouTube and garnered over 1 million streams on Spotify. It gained traction on Instagram, inspiring over four lakh individuals to create reels. Prior hits like "Bappa Wala Gaana", "Dimple", and "Style Martay" also resonated well with audiences. Rathod's next month release "Gulabi Sadi" was a bigger hit, garnered massive attention on social media platforms, trending in top 55 music videos on YouTube. Bollywood actress Madhuri Dixit recreated the dance steps of the song.

== Awards ==
Awards	Date of ceremony	Category	Result	Ref.
Maharashtracha Favourite Kon?	18 January 2024	Favourite song (non-film)	Won	
