= Aarya Ambekar =

Indian Marathi singer and actress (born 1994)

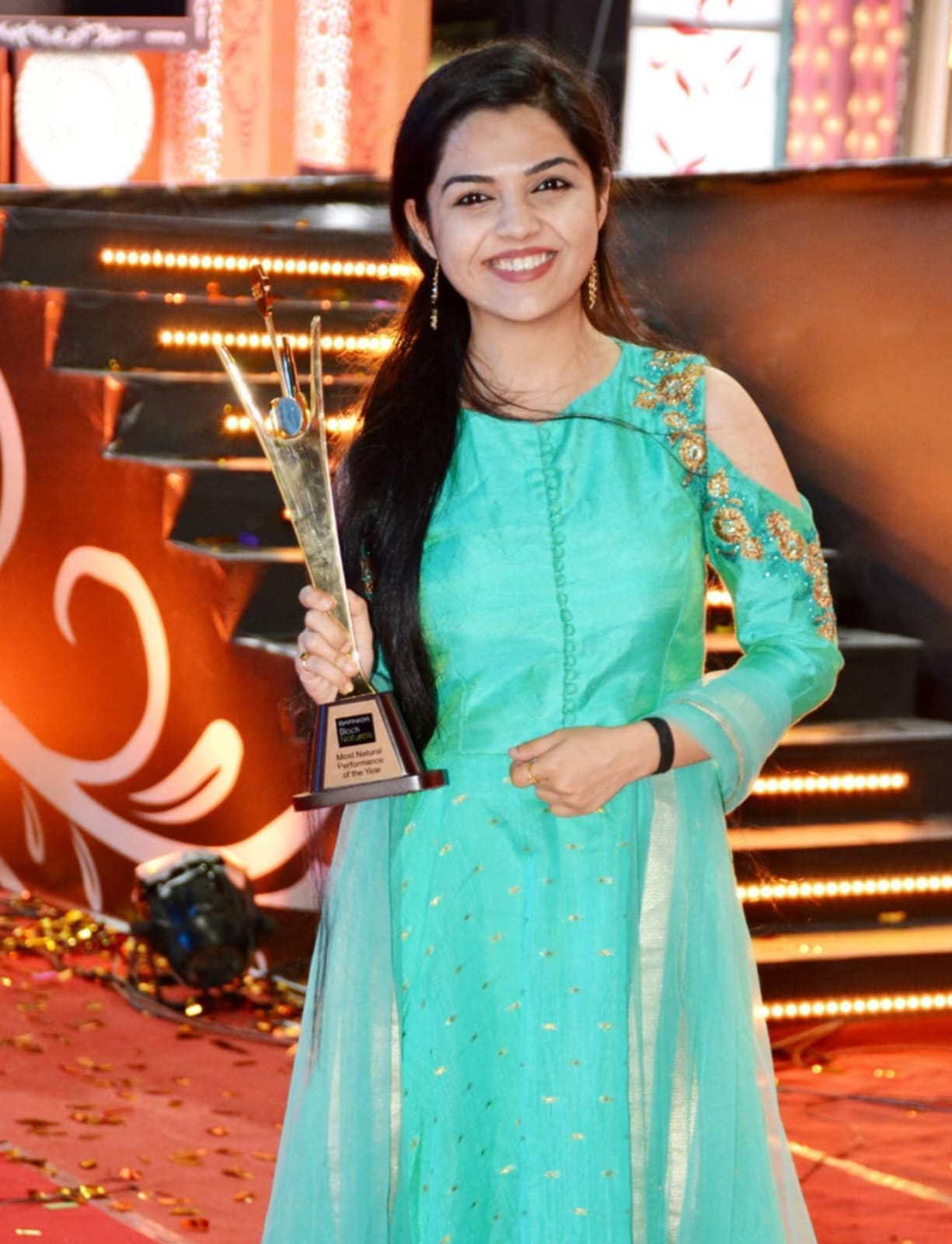
- Born: 16 June 1994 (age 32); Nagpur, Maharashtra, India
- Occupations: Singer; actress
- Years active: 2008–present
- Known for: Sa Re Ga Ma Pa Marathi Li'l Champs; Ti Saddhya Kay Karte
- Musical career
- Genre: Indian classical music
- Instrument: Vocal
- Label: Universal Music India

Aarya Ambekar is a Marathi playback singer and actor from Pune, Maharashtra. She has recorded numerous songs for films and albums in Marathi and Hindi. She has also performed at various prestigious concerts across India and overseas including UAE, USA, Australia, Japan. She was the first Marathi female singer to perform in Tokyo. Aarya has won numerous accolades including a Filmfare Award and Maharashtra State Film Awards.

She participated and reached the finals of the first season of Sa Re Ga Ma Pa Marathi Li'l Champs aired on Zee Marathi channel between July 2008 and February 2009.

Aarya made her acting debut in January 2017 through the film and act character Tanvi in Ti Saddhya Kay Karte.

Lagu Bandhu a Mumbai based jewellery brand announced Aarya as their brand ambassador in October 2025.

== Career ==
Aarya Ambekar's musical journey began early, as her grandmother, a classical vocalist, recognized her talent when she was just two years old. Aarya began formal music training at the age of five and a half under the guidance of her mother, Shruti Ambekar, and gave her first public performance at six.

She rose to fame as a finalist in Sa Re Ga Ma Pa Marathi Li'l Champs in 2008, which served as a launchpad for her professional career.

Aarya made her playback singing debut with the Marathi film Balgandharva (2011), performing classical compositions, and has since sung for films like Rama Madhav and Ti Saddhya Kay Karte, receiving numerous awards. In addition to playback singing, she has released independent singles in Marathi and Hindi and performs live music shows across Maharashtra. Ambekar made her acting debut in the 2017 film Ti Saddhya Kay Karte, further establishing herself in the Marathi entertainment industry.

=== Sa Re Ga Ma Pa Marathi Li'l Champs ===
In 2008, Aarya was auditioned for the debut season of Sa Re Ga Ma Pa Marathi Li'l Champs, a competitive music reality show organized by the Zee Marathi television channel. She was one of the final 50 who were selected from amongst several thousand children aged between 8 and 14 across Maharashtra. She made her way to the top 10 finalists and then to the Final 5 Mega-Finalists. Aarya was popularly referred to as the "Pretty Young Girl", during the show.

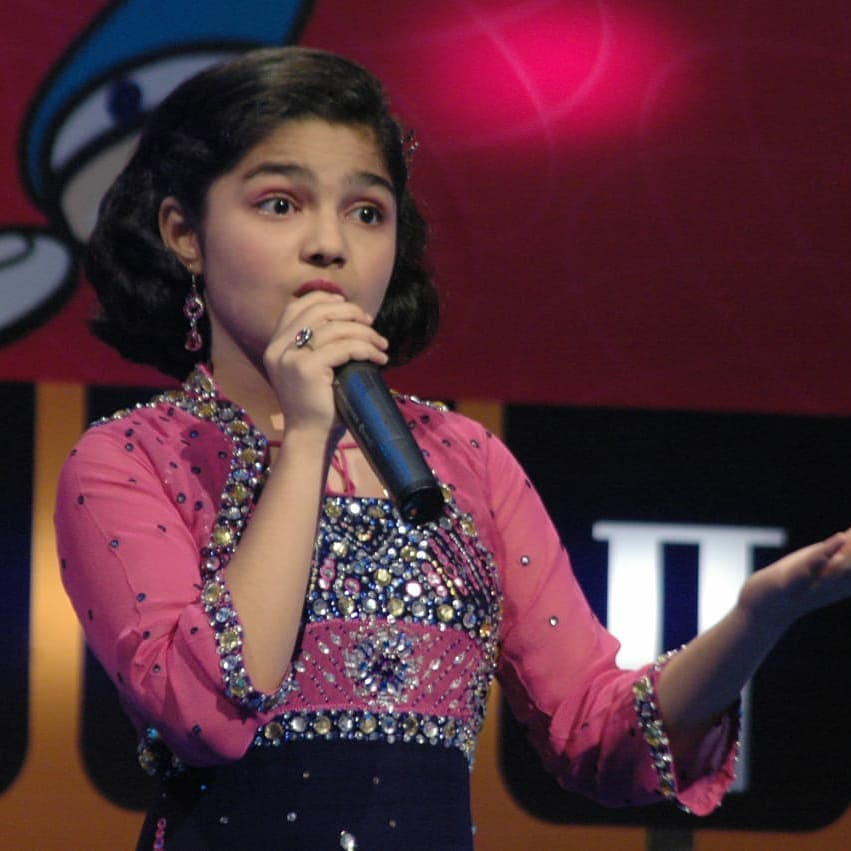
Aarya in the TV series Sa Re Ga Ma Pa L'il Champs

Aarya sang a wide variety of songs in the competition. She created the record of receiving full marks from the judges many times. Aarya created an unbeatable record when she got Upper Ni(equivalent to 200%), for her beautifully sung "Paan Khae Saiyyan Hamaro", which remains unbroken in all the nine Schedules of SA RE GA MA PA and even after two schedules of SA RE GA MA PA for professional singers. Singer Hariharan was the celebrity judge for that episode.

Aarya was also awarded performer of the week in numerous episodes by eminent singing personalities like Mahalaxmi Iyer, Shreya Ghoshal, Hariharan etc. Aarya sings a wide variety of songs ranging from pure classical songs, Natyageet, Bhavgeet, Bhaktigeet to Marathi Chitrapat Sangeet, Hindi songs, folk songs, Lavanis as well.

She sang "Aye Mere Watan Ke Logo" to pay tribute to those who died in the 2008 Mumbai attacks on 26 November 2008. She also performed the same song at Shivaji Park, Dadar in a program organised by Mumbai Police to pay tribute to the martyrs who laid down their lives fighting the terrorists in that attack. The song was originally sung by Lata Mangeshkar after the 1962 India-China War. During the course of the program, Aarya was also awarded the Manik Varma Scholarship. She is the youngest singer to win the scholarship.

=== Sa Re Ga Ma Pa Marathi Li'l Champs Season 3 ===
Aarya along with other finalists of the first season returned to the singing reality show 12 years after the debut season as a judge on the show.

=== Acting ===
Year	Film	Role	Ref.
2017	Ti Saddhya Kay Karte	Young Tanvi Dev	

== Personal life ==
Aarya is the daughter of Samir Ambekar and Shruti Ambekar. Shruti Ambekar is a classical vocalist of Jaipur Gharana whereas Samir is a doctor by profession. Aarya holds a Bachelor of Arts, BA, degree with a major in economics. She studied in the prestigious Fergusson College for her bachelor's degree. She holds a Master of Arts, MA, degree in music. She ranked first in the university for her MA examination and earned a gold medal. She has completed a certificate course in Sound Engineering.

== Discography ==
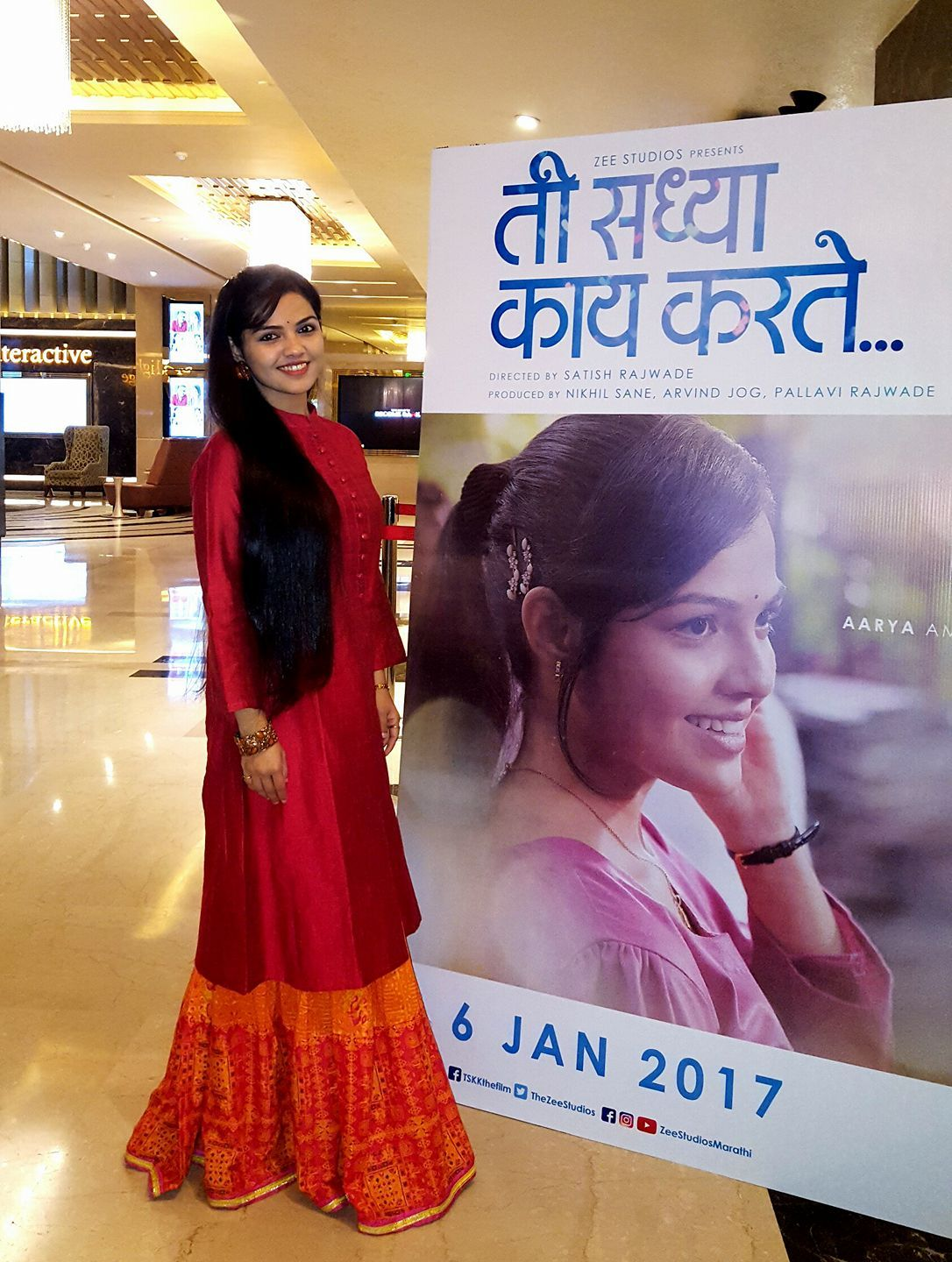
Aarya Ambekar at the premiere event of the film Ti Saddhya Kay Karte

=== Albums ===
- Pancha Ratna Vol. 1, 2, 3 on Universal Music India
- Garjati Sahyadriche Kade
- Jai Hari Vitthal
- Marathi Abhimaangeet composed by Kaushal Inamdar
- Aathava Swar composed by Mrs. Varsha Bhave
- Mala Mhanatyat Aarya Ambekar
- Geet Tujhe Gata Gata – Collections of poems of famous poets
- Khaucha Gaav composed by Yashwant Deo
- Hum Aur Tum – Hindi songs album composed by Khalil Abhyankar
- Aanandwan Ale Ghari – Shri Baba Amte
- Majhya Matiche Gayan – Kusumagraj Pratishthan
- Diva Lagu De Re Deva – First solo album based on poems of eminent Marathi poets. The album is composed by famous composer Saleel Kulkarni
- Door Chandanyanchya Gaava – composer, Neeraj; lyrics, Dr Kshama Valsangkar

=== Singles ===
Year	Track	Language	Co Artist(s)	Lyricist	Composer(s)	Label
2016	Alavar Majhe Man Bavare	Marathi		Khalil Abhyankar	Khalil Abhyankar	Universal Music India
2016	Kaare Se	Hindi		Rohan Nikam	Devendra Bhome	TaleScope Pictures
2018	Vande Maataram	Marathi		Sudhir Moghe	Saleel Kulkarni	Times Music Marathi
2024	Hriday Mein Shri Ram Hain	Hindi	Suresh Wadkar	Sandip Khare	Saleel Kulkarni	India Independent (ii Music)
2024	Gum Ka Nagma	Hindi		Ilahi Jamadar	Prasad Phatak	S.V.P. Muscis
2024	Dukkh Jalte Ajun	Marathi		Anand Jorvekar	Sanjay Gite	
2024	Asale Kase	Marathi		Rutuja Deshkar	Tanmay Bhide	
2024	Aathavaninno	Marathi	Nisarg Patil			Merchant Records
2024	Moraya Vinayaka	Marathi		Guru Thakur	Ankush Boradkar, Mayur Bahulkar	Times Music
2025	Pasaayadaan	Marathi		Sant Dnyaneshwar	Devdutta Manisha Baji	CS Music
2025	Hanumaan Chalisa	Awadhi	Various	Goswami Tulsidas	Milind Vasudev Kulkarni	
2025	Mulgi Jhali	Marathi	Viraj Daki	Sujit Viraj	Sujit Viraj	Abhiman Marathi
2025	Assal Marathi Garba	Marathi	Mangesh Pangarkar	Mangesh Pangarkar	Rushikesh Shelar	

=== Television ===
Year	Title	Composer	Channel	Co-artist
2011	Suvasini	Nilesh Moharir	Star Pravah	Solo
2015	Dil Dosti Duniyadari	Pankaj Padghan	Zee Marathi	Rohit Raut, Juilee Joglekar
2018	Tula Pahate Re	Ashok Patki	Zee Marathi	Solo
2019	Jeevlaga	Nilesh Moharir	Star Pravah	Vaishali Samant, Hrishikesh Ranade, Swapnil Bandodkar
2019	Aai Kuthe Kay Karte!	Avadhoot Gupte	Star Pravah	Solo
2019	Aggabai Sasubai (Rang Punha Aala)	Ashok Patki	Zee Marathi	Solo
2020	Majha Hoshil Na	Ashok Patki	Zee Marathi	Solo
2021	Tuza Maza Jamtay	Sai-Piyush	Zee Yuva	Abhay Jodhpurkar
2021	Man Udu Udu Jhala	Saleel Kulkarni	Zee Marathi	Avadhoot Gupte
2021	Yeu Kashi Tashi Me Nandayla (Mann Bawarle)	Ashok Patki	Zee Marathi	Rohit Raut
2022	Majhi Manasa	Pankaj Padghan	Sun Marathi	Solo
2022	Tuzech Mi Geet Gaat Aahe	Avadhoot Gupte	Star Pravah	Solo
2023	Kasturi	Kunal-Karan	Colors Marathi	Rohit Raut
2024	Thoda Tuza Ani Thoda Maza	Avinash–Vishwajeet	Star Pravah	Nachiket Lele

=== Films ===
Denotes films that have not yet been released

Year	Film	Song	Composer(s)	Lyricist(s)	Co-artist(s)
2010	Let's Go Back	Tujhya Vina	AV Prafullachandra	Ramkumar Shedge	Solo
2011	Balgandharva	Pariyeva Ke Payal Sajani	Kaushal Inamdar	K.P. Khadilkar	Solo
2011	Kali	Umalun Yein Kali	Shrinivas Khale	Guru Thakur	Solo
2013	Yoddha	Trivaar Jay Jay Kar	Omkar Kelkar	Namdeo Dhondo Mahanor	Solo
2014	Rama Madhav	Hamamma Re Pora	Anand Modak	Sant Dnyaneshwar	Sharayu Date
2014	Sant Kaikadi Maharaj	Sant Kaikadi	Anand Modak		Solo
2014	Goshta Tichya Premachi	Sakhya Re	Vikrant Warde	Narendra Thakur	Solo
2014	Goshta Tichya Premachi	Hur Hur	Vikrant Warde	Narendra Thakur	Solo
2015	Cinderella	Deva	Pankaj Padghan	Omkar Mangesh Datta	Solo
2015	Cinderella	Deva Kasa Re	Pankaj Padghan	Omkar Mangesh Datta	Solo
2016	Photocopy	Lag Bag Sakharpudyachi	A.V. Prafullachandra	AV Prafullachandra	Solo
2017	Ti Saddhya Kay Karte	Jara Jara Tipur Chandane	Nilesh Moharir	Ashwini Shende	Hrishikesh Ranade
2017	Ti Saddhya Kay Karte	Jara Jara Tipur Chandane (reprise)	Nilesh Moharir	Ashwini Shende	Solo
2017	Ti Saddhya Kay Karte	Hrudayat Vaje Something (female)	Avinash–Vishwajeet	Vishwajeet Joshi	Solo
2017	Ti Saddhya Kay Karte	Kitida Navyane	Mandar Apte	Devyani Karve-Kothari	Mandar Apte
2017	Autumgiri	O Sajna	P. Shankaram		Solo
2019	Ready Mix	Kaa Mann He	Avinash–Vishwajeet	Ashwini Shende	Farhad Bhiwandiwala
2019	Wedding Cha Shinema	Majhya Mamachya Lagnala	Saleel Kulkarni	Sandeep Khare	Shubhankar Kulkarni, Prasenjit Kosambi
2019	66 Sadashiv	Dahi Dishatun Sonech Sone	Narendra Bhide	Vaibhav Joshi	Savani Shende
2020	Bayko Deta Ka Bayko	Gavat Hyo Navin Aalay	Dhanashree Ganatra	Dhanashree Ganatra	Solo
2022	Kulup	Kesari Kesari	Rudra Karpe		Solo
2022	143	Bharala Ura Madhi	P. Shankaran	Lakhan Choudhari	Solo
2022	Chandramukhi	Bai Ga	Ajay-Atul	Guru Thakur	Solo
2022	Timepass 3	Loveable	Amitraj	Kshitij Patwardhan	Harshwardhan Wavare
2022	Sahela Re	Sai Bai Ga	Saleel Kulkarni	Aruna Dhere	Madhura Datar
2022	Tu Fakt Ho Mhan	Man Moharala	Bhaskar Daberao	Surekha Gavande	Solo
2023	Sarla Ek Koti	Kevadyacha Paan Tu	Vijay Narayan Gavande	Guru Thakur	Ajay Gogavale
2023	Sari	Dhim Dhim	Amitraj	Mandar Cholkar	Harshavardhan Wavare
2023	Get Together	Roop Sajalaya (Duet)	Ajay Ranpise	Ajay Ranpise	Ajay Ranpise
2023	Get Together	Roop Sajalaya (Female version)	Ajay Ranpise	Ajay Ranpise	Solo
2023	Chhapa Kata	Kuni Sanjava Majhya Manala	Mukul Kashijat	Meghana Gore	Abhay Jodhpurkar
2023	Chandramukhi 2	Swagathanjali (Hindi version)	M. M. Keeravaani	Chaitanya Prasad	Solo
2024	Sridevi Prasanna	Toch Ahe	Amitraj	Kshitij Patwardhan	Harshvardhan Wavare
2024	Delivery Boy	Tu Aai Honar	Chinar-Mahesh	Prashant Madpuwar	Solo
2024	Fatwa	Choru Chorun (female)	Sanjeev-Darshan	Dr. Vinayak Pawar	Solo
2024	MyLek	Nastana Tu	Pankajj Padghan	Kshitij Patwardhan	Pankajj Padghan
2024	Kaasara	Man Palataya	Prashant Nakti and Sanket Gurav	Prashant Nakti	Rishabh Sathe
2024	Phullwanti	Phullwanti Title Track	Avinash–Vishwajeet	Vaibhav Joshi	Solo
2024	Gulaabi	Phiruni Navyane Janmen Mi	Sai-Piyush	Mandar Cholkar	Solo
2024	Hashtag Tadev Lagnam	Sagalyancha Photo Aala Pahije	Pankajj Padghan	Kshitij Patwardhan	Nakash Aziz
2024	Dharmarakshak Mahaveer Chhatrapati Sambhaji Maharaj: Part 1	Raja Sambhaji Re Majha (Sad version)	Mohit Kulkarni	Hrishikesh Zambare	Solo
2024	Dharmarakshak Mahaveer Chhatrapati Sambhaji Maharaj: Part 1	Sher Sambhaji Hamare (Sad version)	Mohit Kulkarni	Hrishikesh Zambare	Solo
2025	Sangeet Manapamaan	Mala Madan Bhase	Shankar-Ehsaan-Loy	K. P. Kadhilkar	Solo
2025	Sangeet Manapamaan	Shura Mee Vandile	Shankar-Ehsaan-Loy	K. P. Kadhilkar	Shankar Mahadevan, Avadhoot Gupte, Asmita Chinchalkar
2025	Sangeet Manapamaan	Prem Seva Sharan	Shankar-Ehsaan-Loy	K. P. Kadhilkar	Anand Bhate
2025	Sangeet Manapamaan	Jai Ho Sangrampur	Shankar-Ehsaan-Loy	K. P. Kadhilkar	Avadhoot Gupte, Savani Ravindra, Shrinidhi Ghatate
2025	Ilu Ilu 1988	Ilu Ilu (title track)	Rohit Nagbhide	Prashant Madpuwar	
2025	Amaran	Ved He (He Minnale)	G. V. Prakash Kumar	Magesh Kangane	Harshavardhan Wavare
2025	Devmanus	Sobati	Rohan-Rohan	Prashant Madpuwar	Shekhar Ravjiani
2025	26 November	Saad Ghali Man Majh	Amar Prabhakar Desai	Nilesh Onkar	Swapnil Bandodkar
2025	Gondhal	CHANDANA	Ilaiyaraaja		Ajay Gogavale
2026	After Operation London Cafe	Kay Bolu Ya Pudhe Mi	Prashnu Jha	Kshitij Pathvardhan	Abhay Jodhpurkar
2026	Tumbadchi Manjula	Assa Vegala Gaav	Prateek Omkar Kelkar, Zariya, Tejas Aditya Joshi	Vikram Edke	Rahul Deshpande
2026	Jabraat	Raaya Tumhi Yeta	Dr. Jaibhim Shinde	Dr. Jaibhim Shinde	
2026	Tula Pahata	Tula Pahta (Title track)	Rohan Rohan	Mandar Cholkar	
2026	Tula Pahata	Sparsh Nave	Rohan Rohan	Dinesh Ghogle	Javed Ali
2026	Swapnasundari	Jadu Kelis tu	Ankush Boradkar	Shrirang Godbole	Abhijeet Sawant
2026	Swapnasundari	Taare Sajale Akashi	Ankush Boradkar	Sachin Kadam	
2026	Sammarth	Bandh Vimochan Ram	Kedar Pandit	Sant Vennabai	
2026	Abeer	Deva Panduranga Vitthala	Rohit Nagbhide	Vaibhav Deshmukh	
2026	Dashami	Kalij Dhad Dhadla	Suresh Pandit	Suresh Pandit	Onkarswaroop

== Public appearances ==
A few events where Aarya has performed –

- Vasantotsav 2008 – Musical concert arranged in Pune every year by Rahul Deshpande in memory of his legendary grandfather Vasantrao Deshpande
- Shrimant Dagadusheth Halwai Ganapati Music Festival 2009, 2010.
- Little Champs live shows in many cities like Mumbai, Pune, Nashik Sangli, Aurangabad, Goa, Ratnagiri, Thane, Nagpur, Wardha, Bhopal etc. and at international venues like Dubai, Abu Dhabi. These are runaway popular shows where Aarya performs with four other Little Champs Mugdha Vaishampayan, Prathamesh Laghate, Rohit Raut and Kartiki Gaikwad in perfect sync. This group is known as 'Panch-Ratna'.
- Live performance in the devotional program arranged in the presence of Sathya Sai Baba in Sai Ashram at village Hadshi, near Pune in October 2009
- Live performance in the special program arranged on the occasion of the birthday of Sathya Sai Baba in Sai Ashram at Puttaparthi. November 2009
- Live performance in Swar Asha program arranged to felicitate Asha Bhosale in Pune in March 2010. Aarya sang duets with Sudesh Bhonsle in this program. The program was aired on Mi Marathi Channel.
- Live performance at a function organised by Deccan Education Society to mark its 125th year of existence. Aarya performed in front of The Honourable President of India, Her Excellency Pratibha Patil.
- Live performance along with Lata Mangeshkar in special function organised by Shiv Sena on occasion of the Golden Jubilee Year of Maharashtra State on Maharashtra Day.
- Antarnaad – a program consisting of compositions by Shrinivas Khale. The program was aired on Mi Marathi Channel on 29 August 2010.
- As a celebrity guest in Ashtavinayak Darshan along with Prathamesh Laghate. Ashtavinayak Darshan program consists of visits to the eight holy temples of Lord Ganesha (Ashtavinayaka) situated around Pune district. This program was telecast on Star Majha news channel during the Ganpati Festival 2010 from 11 to 18 September 2010.
- Live performance in Nashik Festival 2011
- Bheeti Laagi Jeeva 2010, 2011 – a special show on the yearly pilgrimage from Alandi to Pandharpur telecast on IBN Lokmat.
- Maharashtra Mandal Dubai (MPFS) 2017 – As a part of Waarsa Suraancha
- TEDxVIT 2021

== Awards and recognition ==
- 2008 – Youngest to be awarded the "Manik Varma Scholarship" towards her future music studies
- 2009 – Runner-up of the Sa Re Ga Ma Pa Marathi Li'l Champs reality-based music competition organised by Zee Marathi
- 2009 – Maharashtra Shasan Puraskar
- 2010 – Haribhau Sane Award
- 2010 – Punyaratna – YuvaGaurav Award
- 2011 – Big Marathi Rising Star Award (Music)
- 2012 – Young Achievers Award – awarded by Whistling Woods International
- 2012 – Dr. Vasantrao Deshpande Puraskar
- 2014 – Aarya Puraskar
- 2015 – Dr. Usha Atre Award by Swaranand Pratisthan
- 2016 – Vidya Pradnya Puraskar by Ga.Di.Ma. Pratisthan
- 2017 – Godrej Fresh Face of the Year – Sahyadri Navaratna Awards
- 2018 – Best Female Singer and Best Acting Debut – Female for Ti Saddhya Kay Karte - Maharashtracha Favourite Kon by Zee Talkies
- 2018 – Most Natural Performance of the Year for Ti Sadhya Kay Karate – Zee Chitra Gaurav
- Nominated - Zee Chitra Gaurav Puraskar for Best Playback Singer – Female For Song Hridayat waje something From the Movie Ti Sadhya Kay Karte.
- 2018 – Best Female Singer and Best Acting Debut – Female for Ti Sadhya Kay Karate – City Cine Awards Marathi by Radio City
- 2019 – Lokmat Sur Jytosna National Music Award by the hands of Union Minister Shri Nitin Gadkari
- 2021 - Best Female Singer of the Decade for the song, 'Hrudayat Vaje Something' from the 2017 movie 'Ti Sadhya Kay Karate' - Maharashtracha Favourite Kon?
- 2022 – Fakt Marathi Cine Sanman for Best Playback Singer Female for "Bai Ga" from Chandramukhi
- 2023 – Best Playback Singer Female for "Bai Ga" from Chandramukhi (Shared with Shreya Ghoshal) – Zee Chitra Gaurav
- 2023 – Best Playback Singer Female for "Bai Ga" from Chandramukhi – Filmfare Awards
- 2023 - Best Playback Singer Female for "Bai Ga" from Chandramukhi – Sakaal Premier Awards.
- 2023 6TH MAJJA DIGITAL AWARD - Best Singer Female for "Bai Ga" from Chandramukhi.
- 2024 - Fergusson College Alumni Association felicitated her as a Distinguished Alumnus and awarded her with 'Fergusson Gaurav Puraskar' at the hands of Chhatrapati Shahu Maharaj (Shahu II of Kolhapur), the Chairperson of Deccan Education Society which runs the Fergusson College
- 2024 - Best Singer (Female) for "Kevadyache Paan Tu" from Sarla Ek Koti - Radio City Cine Awards
- 2025 - 60th Maharashtra State Flim Awards Best Playback Singer Female for "Bai Ga" from Chandramukhi
