= Vees Mhanje Vees =

- Directed by: Uday Bhandarkar
- Starring: Arun Nalawade; Mrinmayee Godbole; Rajan Bhise
- Cinematography: Avinash Arun
- Edited by: Shyam Salgaonkar
- Music by: Anand Modak
- Release date: 10 June 2016
- Country: India
- Language: Marathi

Vees Mhanje Vees is an Indian Marathi language film directed by Uday Bhandarkar and Produced by National Film Development Corporation of India. The film stars Mrinmayee Godbole, Rajan Bhise and Arun Nalawade. The film was released on 10 June 2016.

== Synopsis ==
Shailaja takes it upon herself to fulfil her father's dream and runs a school. However, the authorities threaten to shut down the institution due to fewer students.

== Cast ==
- Mrinmayee Godbole as Shailaja
- Arun Nalawade as Antookaka
- Aditi Devlankar as Sangita
- Rajan Bhise as Anna
- Shivaji Barve as Karmakar

== Critical response ==
Vees Mhanje Vees film received mixed reviews from critics. Mihir Bhanage of The Times of India gave the film 2.5 stars out of 5 and wrote "Being an NFDC production, one expects a lot from 'Vees Mhanje Vees' but alas, this is just an old wine in a new bottle".

Rahi Gaikwad of The Hindu wrote "However, mere good intentions are not enough to redeem the inadequacies of a facile plotline, staid dialogues, and some poorly executed scenes".

Ganesh Matkari of Pune Mirror wrote "Overall, the film feels like a missed opportunity of showing a significant story, highlighting an important and unusual social issue. As it stands, its a marginal success story for a niche audience".

Soumitra Pote of Maharashtra Times gave the film 2.5 stars out of 5 and wrote "However, it is felt that if a little more work had been done on the level of story and screenplay, the drama would have come out more".
