= Sukh Kalale =

- Official song cover

Song by Shreya Ghoshal

from the album Ved
- Language: Marathi
- Released: 27 December 2022
- Genre: Indian pop
- Length: 3:26
- Label: Warner Music India
- Songwriter: Ajay-Atul
- Composer: Ajay-Atul
- Producer: Ajay-Atul

Ved track listing
- 1. "Ved Tujha"; 2. "Besuri"; 3. "Ved Lavlay"; 4. "Sukh Kalale"; 5. "My One and Only"; 6. "Sukh Kalale" (Ajay Gogavale version)

Music video
- Sukh Kalale on YouTube

"Sukh Kalale" is a Marathi-language song from the soundtrack album of the film Ved, directed by Riteish Deshmukh. The song is composed and written by Ajay-Atul, sung by Shreya Ghoshal. The song depicting Shravani's (Genelia D'Souza) one-sided love in the film. It became a hit. A new version of the same song is featured in the voice of Ajay Gogavle.

== Credits ==
Credits adapted from YouTube.

- Music – Ajay-Atul
- Lyrics – Ajay-Atul
- Singer – Shreya Ghoshal
- Recorded & mixed by – Vijay Dayal (YRF Studios)
  - Assisted by – Chinmay Mestry
- Mastered by – Donal Whelan at Hafod Mastering ( whales )
- Music composed, arranged, produced and conducted by – Ajay-Atul
- Additional vocals – Strings Performed by the Budapest Scoring Symphonic Orchestra

== Release ==
The song was digitally released on 27 December 2022 on YouTube channel Desh Music. A new version sung by Ajay Gogavale was released on 15 February 2023.

== Awards and nominations ==
Year	Award	Category	Nominee (s)	Result	Ref.
2022	Filmfare Awards Marathi	Best Lyricist	Ajay-Atul	Nominated	
2022	Filmfare Awards Marathi	Best Female Playback Singer	Shreya Ghoshal	Nominated	
2024	Maharashtracha Favourite Kon?	Favourite Song	"Sukh Kalale"	Won	
2024	Maharashtracha Favourite Kon?	Favourite Singer – Female	Shreya Ghoshal	Won	
2023	Fakt Marathi Cine Sanman	Best Lyricist	Ajay-Atul	Won	
2023	Fakt Marathi Cine Sanman	Best Playback Singer Female	Shreya Ghoshal	Won	
