= Ved (film) =

2022 Indian film by Riteish Deshmukh

- Theatrical release poster
- Directed by: Riteish Deshmukh
- Screenplay by: Rushikesh Turai; Sandeep Patil; Riteish Deshmukh
- Story by: Shiva Nirvana
- Based on: Majili by Shiva Nirvana
- Produced by: Genelia D'Souza
- Starring: Riteish Deshmukh; Genelia D'Souza; Ashok Saraf; Jiya Shankar
- Cinematography: Bhushankumar Jain
- Edited by: Chandan Arora
- Music by: Score: Saurabh Bhalerao; Songs: Ajay-Atul
- Production company: Mumbai Film Company
- Release date: 30 December 2022
- Running time: 148 minutes
- Country: India
- Language: Marathi
- Budget: ₹15 crore
- Box office: ₹75 crore

Ved (transl. Madness) is a 2022 Indian Marathi-language romantic drama film directed by Riteish Deshmukh, in his directorial debut, and produced by Genelia D'Souza, both of whom also star along with Jiya Shankar marking her debut in Marathi films. Ashok Saraf play supporting roles. It is a remake of the 2019 Telugu language romantic slice of life, Majili. Like the original, the film follows a high functioning alcoholic cricket coach struggling to overcome his past trauma, while his wife selflessly ensures his rehabilitation, at the cost of her own happiness.

It was theatrically released on 30 December 2022, to positive reviews with praise for its performances (especially Deshmukh's and D'Souza's), direction, cinematography, soundtrack, and background score. Though, some criticised its slow pace. With a gross collection of ₹75 crore (US$7.8 million), it became the highest-grossing Marathi film of 2022 and the fourth highest-grossing Marathi film of all time, surpassing Deshmukh's own Lai Bhaari (2014). At 14th MKF Awards, the film received 15 nominations and won a leading seven awards, including Best Actor and Best Director for Riteish Deshmukh.

== Plot ==
Satya Jadhav lives in Mumbai, with his father, Dinkar Jadhav. He aspires to play for the Indian Cricket Team and wants to initially get selected for the local Railways cricket team. While trying to get money to get into a cricket team, he runs into Nisha, and after some misunderstandings, they become close and fall in love. However, they are later separated by Nisha's parents, whose father is a strict Naval officer and disciplinarian, along with the circumstances that plague them. Nisha, who promises to return to Satya, never comes back. Satya falls into depression, turning to alcohol, and pushing away his dream of becoming a cricketer.

Meanwhile, Shravani, Satya's neighbor, had been in love with Satya, since their childhood, of which he is unaware. When she learns of Satya's love for Nisha, she starts distancing herself from him, but marries him a few years later, after sensing his and Dinkar's pain. However, Satya married Shravani due to pressure from his father, not out of love. He does not work and instead, relives his memories of Nisha. He relies on Shravani's salary who works at Indian railways, for money to buy alcohol.

When Satya goes to Delhi to help select some cricket players from a youth team, he encounters Khushi, Nisha's daughter. He learns from Nisha's father, that Nisha and her husband, Kunal, died in an accident. Heartbroken, Satya agrees to take Khushi in, as a coach and train her as a cricketer, as it was Nisha's wish. He takes Khushi back to Raigad for cricket training. After letting his family know of the situation, Satya and Shravani both decide to adopt Khushi. However, Khushi says that she will only agree to become their adopted daughter, only if, Satya and Shravani sort out their problems and do not distance themselves, to which they agree.

Satya realizes Shravani's love for him during this time and decides to let go of his past for a new start. However, Shravani thinks he is just acting that way to please Khushi. She decides to get a job transfer to Nagpur, leaving Satya, Khushi, and Dinkar behind. When Satya drops Shravani off at the railway station, he tells her that he loves her and apologizes to her for causing her pain. A delighted Shravani decides to stay back. They both embrace and kiss, with Satya finishing his journey toward love.

== Cast ==
- Riteish Deshmukh as Satya Jadhav, a former cricketer
- Genelia Deshmukh as Shravani Jadhav, Satya's wife
- Jiya Shankar as Nisha Katkar, Satya's ex-girlfriend
- Ashok Saraf as Dinkar Jadhav; Satya's father
- Vidyadhar Joshi as Murli Shinde; Shravani's father
- Raviraj Kande as Bhaskar Anna
- Shubhankar Tawde as Jonty
- Khushi Hajare as Khushi; Nisha and Kunal's biological daughter; Shravani and Satya's adopted daughter
- Vineet Sharma as Captain Kumar Katkar; Nisha's father and Khushi's maternal grandfather
- Sandy as Inspector Sonavane
- Karan Kishore as Kunal; Nisha's husband and Khushi's biological father
- Hrishikesh Joshi as Sandeep Patil; Shravani's boss
- Siddhartha Jadhav as Suresh
- Jitendra Joshi as Ramesh
- Salman Khan in a guest appearance as Bhau in song "Ved Lavlay"
- Kishor Gadekar in a guest appearance as an advocate

== Production ==
In December 2021, it was announced that Riteish Deshmukh will make his directorial debut in the film to be produced by Genelia Deshmukh under the banner of Mumbai Film Company. The film also marks her debut in Marathi films. Jiya Shankar also debut in Marathi films approached by Rohan Mapushkar. On 2 February 2022, Genelia Deshmukh shared video from the sets of the film. The large part of the film was shot at Nagothane in Alibag, Maharashtra.

Deshmukh explained that they had to change the shooting sequence because of his beard, starting with the second part first. However, when they began shooting the first part, the lockdown in India was enforced. Due to restrictions, only 10 people were allowed on set, which wasn't enough for their scenes. They had to cancel some shoots. When the lockdown eased, they returned to film, but faced a challenge with a freight train blocking the platform. Despite not wanting it in the scene, they had to proceed because the train couldn't be moved for five hours. So, they adapted and shot the scene as it was.

In July 2022, Deshmukh wrapped up shoot.

== Soundtrack ==
Ved

Soundtrack album by Ajay-Atul
- Released: 20 December 2022
- Recorded: 2022
- Genre: Feature film soundtrack
- Length: 22:13
- Language: Marathi
- Label: Warner Music Group

The film's score is composed by Saurabh Bhalerao and the songs are composed by Ajay-Atul while lyrics written by Ajay-Atul and Guru Thakur.

Track listing
No.	Title	Lyrics	Singer(s)	Length
1.	"Ved Tujha"	Ajay-Atul	Ajay Gogavale	3:24
2.	"Besuri"	Ajay-Atul	Vasundhara Vee	5:45
3.	"Ved Lavlay"	Ajay-Atul	Vishal Dadlani, Ajay Gogavale	3:51
4.	"Sukh Kalale"	Ajay-Atul	Shreya Ghoshal	5:39
5.	"My One and Only"	Guru Thakur	Armaan Malik	3:34
6.	"Sukh Kalale (Ajay Version)"	Ajay-Atul	Ajay Gogavale	2:00
Total length:				22:13

Track Listing in Hindi dubbed version

No.	Title	Lyrics	Length
1.	"Pyar Pyar Tu"	Kshitij Patwardhan	2:06
2.	"Lavlay"	Kshitij Patwardhan	4:21
3.	"Pyar Tera"	Kshitij Patwardhan	3:15
4.	"Besuri Main"	Kshitij Patwardhan	5:52
5.	"My One and Only"	Kshitij Patwardhan	4:45
6.	"Tum Jo Mile (Ajay Version)"	Kshitij Patwardhan	4:45

== Release ==
=== Theatrical ===
It was released in theaters on 30 December 2022.

=== Home media ===
Ved was digitally premiered on 28 April 2023 on Disney+ Hotstar in Marathi, along with dubbed version in Hindi.

== Reception ==
=== Critical reception ===
Soham Godbole writing for Loksatta praised the acting of ensemble, cinematography and the music, writing, "The best aspects of the film are the cinematography combined with Ajay Atul's music, [which] takes the film to greater heights." Concluding, Godbole opined, "This movie is sure to be a treat for those who are madly in love and those who love madly." Mihir Bhanage reviewing the film for The Times of India rated it with 3 stars out of 5 and wrote, "Ved is a quintessential romantic drama" that "has been shot aesthetically." Bhanage praised the music, writing "The music by Ajay-Atul is good." Concluding the review Bhanage opined, ".... if you’re an average cinegoer wanting to check out what the buzz around Ved is all about, you might be a tad disappointed."

=== Box office ===
Ved earned ₹2.5 crore net and ₹3.5 crores gross on the opening day. The weekend collection for the film was ₹10 crore, which is fourth-highest opening weekend collection by a Marathi film till date. In its first week the film earned ₹20.67 crore, and by the end of second week the earning rose to ₹40.17 crore, while Taran Adarsh reported ₹42.20 crore.

The film collected ₹50 crore in 20 days of its release. In its fifth week, the film grossed ₹58.11 crore net and ₹70.90 crore gross. The film grossed ₹60.24 crore in India and ₹73.50 worldwide in 45 days.

The film collected ₹60.67 crore in India and ₹74 crore worldwide in its fifty-day run and went on to complete a theatrical run of over 100 days, grossing ₹75 crore worldwide.
