= Vijay Narayan Gavande =

Music director

- Genre: Indian film music
- Occupations: Music director, Composer, Music arranger, Programmer
- Years active: 2009–present

Vijay Narayan Gavande is a composer, arranger, music director, singer, and lyricist born in Sindhudurg, Maharashtra. With over 17 years of experience, he has contributed to nearly 45-50 projects, including film songs, singles, jingles, and advertisements for well-known brands.

== Career ==
Gavande began his musical journey in 2001–02, playing the tabla and harmonium for bhajan mandals in his hometown in Konkan. After moving to Pune, he worked as a keyboard player in music groups until 2004. In 2005, he relocated to Mumbai to pursue a career in the mainstream film industry, working as a music arranger under various composers. His first opportunity as a background music director came with Rajiv Patil's National Award-winning Marathi film Jogwa (2009), where he collaborated with Ajay-Atul.

He gained wider recognition with the song "Devak Kalji Re" from the Marathi film Redu in 2018, which garnered over 170 million views. Over the years, his distinctive style has led to his involvement in new projects based on the appreciation of his previous work.

== Discography ==
=== Films ===
Year	Film	Director	Notes
2009	Jogwa	Rajiv Patil	Background score
2011	Vikalp	Sachin Karande	Background score
2015	Shalee	Atul Satam	Background score
2015	Mungla	Vijay Devkar	Music composer
2016	Mumbai Central	Karan Radhakrishna	Music composer
2017	Karaar	Manoj Kotian	Music composer
2017	Ghuma	Mahesh Raosaheb Kale	Background score
2017	Dashakriya	Sandeep Patil	Background score
2018	Redu	Sagar Vanjari	
2019	Krutant	Datta Bhandare	
2019	Aatpadi Nights	Nitin Supekar	
2022	Soyrik	Makarand Mane	
2022	Avasaan	Abhishek Kolge	
2022	Lagan	Arjun Gujar	
2022	Khapakhap	Kaustubh Kulkarni	Background score
2023	Sarla Ek Koti	Nitin Supekar	Music Director
2023	Pahile Mi Tula	Manoj Kotian	Music Director
2023	Baaplyok	Makarand Mane	Music Director
2023	Songya	Milind Inamdar	Music Director
2023	Global Aadgaon	Anil Kumar Salve	Music Director
2023	Pardon	Sahdev Gholap	Music Director
2024	Parampara	Pranay Telang	Music Director
2024	Sangharsh Yoddha Manoj Jarange Patil	Shivaji Doltade	Music Director
2024	Raja Rani	Shivaji Doltade	Music Director
2025	Ilu Ilu 1998	Ajinkya Phalke	Background score & Music director
2026	Ghabadkund	Pritam S. K. Patil	Music director

=== Television ===
Year	Title	Channel	Ref.
2020-2021	Aai Majhi Kalubai	Sony Marathi	
2021	Bawara Dil	Colors TV	
2024	Aai Tulja Bhavani	Colors Marathi	

=== Album ===
Year	Song	Lyrics	Ref.
2024	"Jagat Bhari Pandharichi Waari"	Guru Thakur	

=== Theatre ===
- Aamne Saamne

== Awards ==
Year	Award	Category	Film	Result
2018	Maharashtra State Film Awards	Best Music Director	Redu	Won
