= Sarla Ek Koti =

- Theatrical release poster
- Directed by: Nitin Sindh Vijay Supekar
- Written by: Nitin Sindh Jay Supekar
- Produced by: Arti Chavan
- Starring: Onkar Bhojane; Isha Keskar; Chhaya Kadam
- Cinematography: Nagraj Divakar
- Edited by: Nitesh Rathod
- Music by: Vijay Narayan Gavande
- Production company: Sanvi Production House
- Distributed by: AA Films
- Release date: 20 January 2023
- Country: India
- Language: Marathi

Sarla Ek Koti is a 2023 Indian Marathi-language drama film directed by Nitin Supekar and produced by Sanvi Production House. It stars Onkar Bhojane, Isha Keskar, Chhaya Kadam. The film was theatrically released on 20 January 2023.

== Plot ==
Bhikaji, a poor daily wage laborer, lives with his beautiful wife Sarla in a small village. When Bhikaji suffers a financial crisis, he recklessly wagers Sarla in a card game and loses to the village landlord. The landlord agrees to return Sarla only if Bhikaji can arrange ₹1 lakh within ten days.

Desperate, Bhikaji seeks help from fellow villagers, but they exploit his situation and demand Sarla in return for financial support. Surrounded by greed and objectification, Sarla refuses to submit and instead devises a plan to outwit both the landlord and the villagers. Using her intelligence and resilience, she turns the tables on those who sought to take advantage of her. In the end, Sarla and Bhikaji emerge with both dignity and prosperity restored.

== Cast ==
=== Main ===
- Onkar Bhojane as Bhikaji Vakhre
- Isha Keskar as Sarla
- Chhaya Kadam as Mathura Vakhre, Bhikaji's mother
- Kamlakar Satpute
- Ramesh Pardeshi
- Vanita Kharat
- Suresh Vishwakarma

=== Supporting ===
- Vijay Nikam
- Abhijeet Chavan
- Yashpal Sarnath
- Jatin Inamdar
- Mahendra Khilare
- Ramakant Bhalerao
- Kapil Kamble
- Shyam Mate
- Shubham Khare
- Yogesh Iratkar
- Abhilasha Paul

== Release ==
Sarla Ek Koti was theatrically released on 20 January 2023 in Maharashtra.

== Reception ==
=== Critical reception ===
Anub George of The Times of India rated 3.5 out of 5 and praised storytelling and interesting situations clearly written in the film and wrote ''The peak moment for this film is the way the narrative turns a 180 at the end.'' Kalpeshraj Kubal of Maharashtra Times rated 2.5 out of 5, and wrote "the first half is completely boring, the second half picks up the pace."

== Soundtrack ==
Sarla Ek Koti

Soundtrack album by Vijay Narayan Gavande
- Released: 23 January 2023
- Genre: Feature film soundtrack
- Length: 11:26
- Language: Marathi
- Label: Ultra Music

Vijay Narayan Gavande chronology
| Khapakhap (2022) | Sarla Ek Koti (2023) | Global Aadgaon (2023) |

Official audio
- Sarla Ek Koti - Full Album on YouTube

Music and background score is by Vijay Narayan Gavande and the lyrics is by Guru Thakur. Songs are recorded by Ajay Gogawale, Aarya Ambekar, Vaishali Mhade and Sayli Khare.

| No. | Title | Length |
|---|---|---|
| 1. | "Kevadyacha Paan Tu" | 5:05 |
| 2. | "Tharyavar Jeev Raahina" | 3:34 |
| 3. | "Saimaya Sajani Le" | 1:33 |
| Total length: | | 11:26 |
