= Dhuan (short story collection) =

Short story collection by Saadat Hasan Manto

- Author: Saadat Hasan Manto
- Original title: Dhuan
- Language: Urdu
- Publisher: Saqi Book Depot (Delhi)
- Publication date: 1941 (first edition)
- Publication place: British India
- Media type: Print

Dhuan (Urdu: Smoke) is a 1941 collection of Urdu short stories by Saadat Hasan Manto.

== Background ==
Dhuan was first published in 1941 from Delhi. This was Manto’s third collection of original short stories after Atish Paray and Manto Ke Afsanay. It was written during the time Manto spent with All India Radio. The collection also included reprints of Manto’s earlier stories published in Atish Paray, such as Chori, Ji Aaya Sahab (Qasim) and Dewana Shair. An identical collection under the title Kali Salwar (Black Trousers) was also published in Lahore the same year.

== Content ==
The stories in this collection include:

- Dhuan (Smoke) (Note: first published in the magazine Saqi.)
- Kabutaron wala sain (Pigeon-seller Mendicant)
- Ullu ka Pattha (Fool)
- Namukamal Tahrir (Unfinished composition)
- Qabz (Constipation)
- Aiktras ki Aankh (An Actress’s Eye)
- Woh khat jo post na kiya gaye (Those letters that were never mailed)
- Misri ki dali (A Piece of Rock Candy)
- Matami Jalsa (Assembly in Mourning)
- Talawwun (Capriciousness)
- Sijdah (Prostration)
- Taraqqi Pasand (Progressive)
- Naya Saal (New Year)
- Cuhe daan (Mousetrap)
- Chori (Thief) (Note: first published in Atish Paray.)
- Qasim (Qasim) (Note: a reprint of Ji Aaya Sahab from Atish Paray with a slightly different ending.)
- Dewana Shair (Note: first published in Atish Paray.)
- Kali Salwar (Black Trouser) (Note: first published in the annual number of Adab-i-Latif (Lahore).)
- Lalten (Lantern)
- Intezar (Wait)
- Phoolon ki sajis (The Flowers’ Conspiracy)
- Garam Sut (Warm Suit)
- Mera Hamsafar (My Fellow Traveller)
- Paresaani ka sabab (The Reason for Worry)

== Themes ==
Dhuan (Smoke), from which the collection takes its title, was first published in the Urdu magazine Saqi. The story deals with the awakening of sexual urges in a twelve-year old boy, Masud. In Cuhe daan (Mousetrap), Manto depicts the early discovery of romantic love by teenagers.

Lalten (Laltern), Misri ki dali (A Piece of Rock Candy) and Namukamal Tahrir (Unfinished composition) are similar tales of attraction of a vacationing young man for a young mountain girl.

Manto explores political issues in Matami Jalsa (Assembly in Mourning) which is a satire on the reaction of people to the news of the death of Mustafa Kemal Atatürk. The story describes an assembly of people gathered to honour Ataturk following his death. Taraqqi Pasand (Progressive), based by a true incident involving Rajinder Singh Bedi and Devindra Satyarthi, is a friendly ribbing on the Progressive Writers' Movement to which Manto was associated.

He touches on social realism in Kali Salwar (Black Trouser) through the character of Sultana, a prostitute whose business is falling. First published in Adab-i-Latif in Lahore, it was banned by the British government under section 292 of the Indian Penal Code on grounds of obscenity.

Aiktras ki Aankh (An Actress’s Eye), Qabz (Constipation) and Paresaani ka sabab (The Reason for Worry) are sketches on the people of the Bombay film industry.

== See also ==
- Kali Salwar - a movie based on Manto’s story of the same name

== Cited sources ==
- Flemming, Leslie A. (1985). Another Lonely Voice: The Life and Works of Saadat Hassan Manto. Vanguard Books.
- Flemming, Leslie A. (1985b). "Manto Bibliography". Journal of South Asian Literature. 20 (2): 152–160. ISSN 0091-5637. JSTOR 40872787.
- Jalil, Rakhshanda (2012). "Loving Progress, Liking Modernity, Hating Manto". Social Scientist. 40 (11/12): 43–52. ISSN 0970-0293. JSTOR 23338869.
- Ispahani, Mahnaz (1988). "Saadat Hasan Manto". Grand Street. 7 (4): 183–193. doi:10.2307/25007150. ISSN 0734-5496. JSTOR 25007150.
- Jalal, Ayesha (2013). The Pity of Partition: Manto's Life, Times, and Work across the India-Pakistan Divide. Princeton University Press. ISBN 978-1-4008-4668-9.
