= Mantostaan =

Indian film of the Urdu writer Saadat Hasan Manto

- Directed by: Rahhat Shah Kazmi
- Based on: Thanda Gosht; Khol Do; Assignment; Akhiri Salute; by Saadat Hasan Manto
- Produced by: Aaditya Pratap Singh; Dr. Bhanu Pratap Singh; Rahat Kazmi; Tariq Khan
- Starring: Raghubir Yadav; Sonal Sehgal; Virendra Saxena
- Edited by: Sandeep Singh Bajeli; Bhanu Pratap Singh
- Release date: 5 May 2017
- Country: India
- Language: Hindi

Mantostaan (transl. Manto's land) is a 2017 Indian film directed by Rahhat Shah Kazmi. The film is based on the four short stories of the Urdu writer Saadat Hasan Manto - "Thanda Gosht", "Khol Do", "Assignment", and "Akhiri Salute".

== Cast ==
- Raghubir Yadav as Sirajuddin
- Virendra Saxena as Milan Sahab
- Sonal Sehgal as Kulwant Kaur
- Shoib Nikash Shah as Eshar Singh
- Aaditya Pratap Singh as Aaditya
- Tariq khan as Ram Singh
- Rahat Kazmi as Rabi Nawaz
- Raina Baasnet as Sugra
- Sakshi Bhatt as Sakina

== Synopsis ==
The movie is based on the four stories of the Urdu writer Saadat Hasan Manto. Set during the Indo-Pakistan partition in 1947, the movie highlights the retributive genocide between the religions, killing as many as 2,000,000 people and displacing over 14 million people.

Khol Do focuses on Saina and her father, Sirajuddin, who are separated during a riot.

Thanda Gosht revolves around the relationship between Ishar Singh and Kulwant Kaur.

Assignment focuses on the enduring relationship between a Muslim former judge and a Sikh man.

Akhri Salute looks at the relationship between childhood friends Ram Singh and Nawab, one an Indian soldier and one a Pakistani soldier, which becomes strained in the midst of their differing allegiances.

== Production ==
This film was mostly shot in Poonch (town), Jammu and Mumbai.

== Release ==
In 2016 the film was screened in the Le March' du Film category at the Cannes International Film Festival, the San Francisco International Film Festival, the Melbourne Film Festival, and the NFDC Film Bazaar 2016. The film was also screened at the London Asian Film Festival in March 2017.

This film released in India on 5 May 2017 to mixed to negative reviews. The largest criticism of the film was that it did not translate the source material well, with The Hindu and Indian Express expressing that the source material felt "lost in adaptation". Sify Movies said "the film does nothing much, other than portray the factual in a stark manner, which is dark, violent and brutal". Live Hindustan did give the film a positive review.

== See also ==
- Kali Salwar
