= Sanjiv Saraf =

Indian businessman and writer

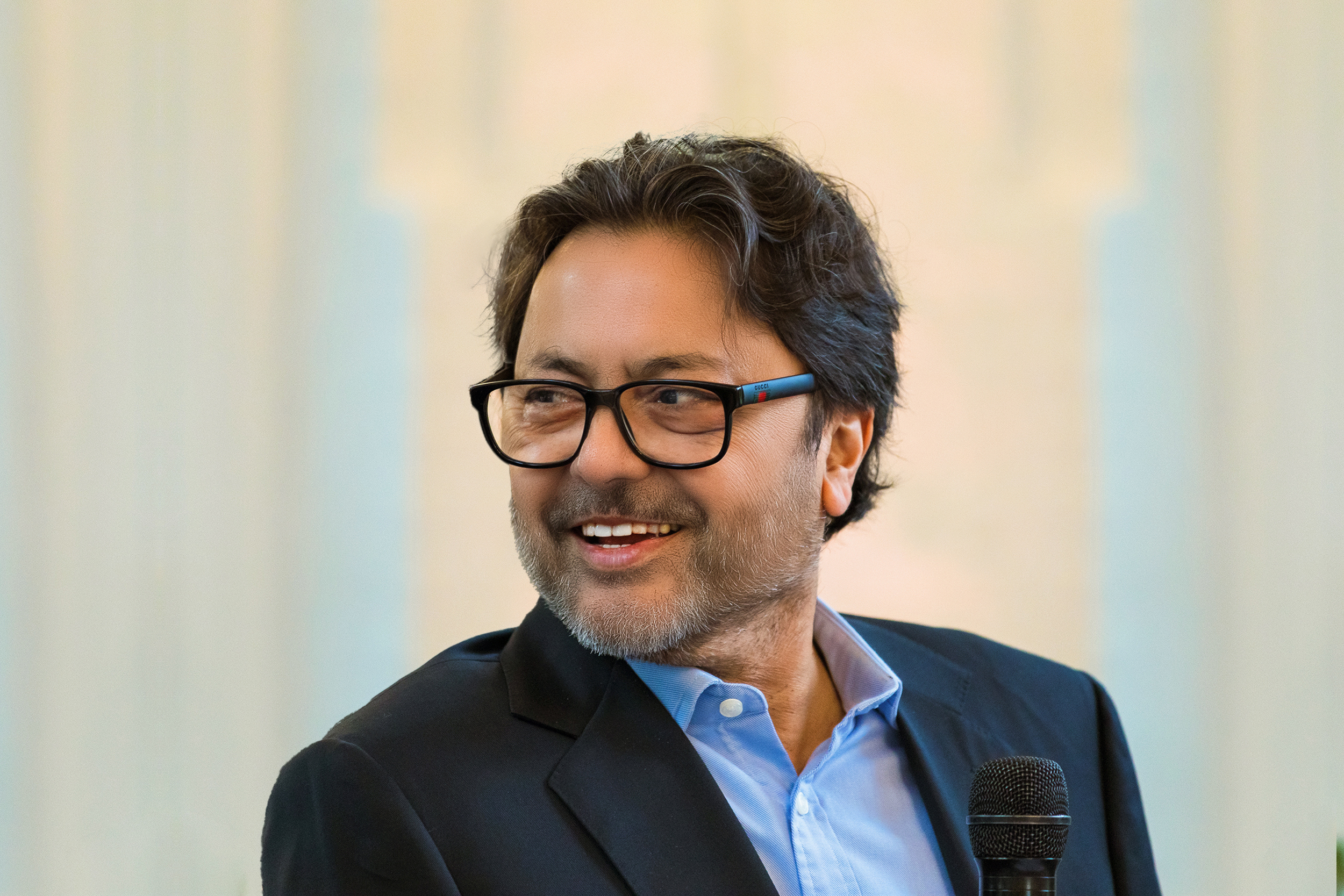
- Born: 30 December 1958 (age 67)
- Education: Agricultural Engineering from IIT Kharagpur
- Occupation: Chairman of Polyplex Corporation Ltd.
- Organization: Rekhta Foundation
- Website: rekhta.org

Sanjiv Saraf (born 30 December 1958) is an Indian entrepreneur, philanthropist, and author. He founded Rekhta Foundation, a not-for-profit organisation which promotes Urdu literature. The Foundation has curated the Rekhta portal to document Urdu literary works and it hosts Jashn-e-Rekhta, an annual literary festival, since 2015. Saraf wrote Love Longing Loss and Nava-e-Sarosh, focusing on Urdu literature and culture.

== Biography ==
Saraf was born on 30 December 1958. He graduated from Scindia School, Gwalior in 1975. He later graduated from IIT Kharagpur in the year 1980 after which he joined the family business.

In 1984, he established Polyplex Corporation, a major producer of thin polyester films. Polyplex is among the thirty five Indian companies in Forbes Asia's 'Best Under a Billion' list. Manupatra, India’s legal online resource, was also founded by Sanjiv Saraf in the year 2000.

He established the Rekhta Foundation in 2013. He obtained an honorary doctorate from Maulana Azad National Urdu University Hyderabad in 2016 for his work in reviving the interest in Urdu language.

In 2020 he was awarded with the Madhav Award by the Scindia school.

== Awards ==
- 2018 - Sir Syed Excellence Award awarded by Aligarh Muslim University in 2018, for the contribution in promoting Urdu.
- 2020 - Madhav Award by Scindia School, Gwalior in 2020, for the entrepreneurial spirit, community service and promotion of Urdu.
- 2013 - Farogh-e-Urdu Award by Nai Duniya in 2013 for the development of Urdu language.
- 2018 - Alamdar-e-Urdu by Bazm-e-Urdu, Dubai in 2018 for non-scholarly contributions in promoting Urdu.
- 2016 - Mir Taqi Mir Award by AFMI (American Federation of Muslims of Indian Origin) in 2016 for the promotion of Urdu language.
