= Fareeda Mehta =

Indian film director

- Born: July 1959 (age 66)
- Occupations: Film Director, Screenwriter

Fareeda Mehta (born July 1959) is an Indian film director who makes short films, documentaries and feature films. Also she collaborates closely with the Press Trust of India and organizations such as UNICEF, NCERT, NORAD and NFDC.

== Early life and education ==
Mehta studied social sciences at Tata Institute of Social Sciences (TISS) in Bombay and later film directing at the Film and Television Institute of India (FTII), Pune.

== Career ==
After graduating at the FTII, Pune as a film director, Mehta made her first short film Hawa Ka Rang in 1989, which was awarded the first prize at the Turin Film Festival. She has also worked on several films directed by Kumar Shahani and Mani Kaul as an assistant.

Her first feature film as a director was the 2002 film Kali Salwaar starring Sadiya Siddiqui, Irrfan Khan, Kay Kay Menon and Vrajesh Hirjee. Centred on a Muslim prostitute coming from Muzaffarpur to Mumbai, Kali Salwaar was an almost abstract odyssey into migration, marginalization, and displacement. Her film is based on a story by Saadat Hasan Manto, the leftist Urdu short story writer of the nineteenth century. Almost the entire film was shot in her neighbourhood in Mumbai, focusing on a lively bazaar. Although the main themes are displacement and the sense of loss in an anonymous metropolis, the setting breathes a striking intimacy. Sultana, the main character, together with her husband and pimp Khudabaksh, soon find out that life in Mumbai is often beyond their control. With nothing left to make ends meet, Khudabaksh is attracted to fakir mysticism, leaving behind his wife, alone with the desperate wish to find a black garment to wear during Moharram, the Islamic month of mourning.

According to Fareeda, Kali Salwaar does not have a message per se, but deals with exchange of energies. In a silent way it creates contemplative spaces in which the audience can pause and let imagination, emotions, and memory roam free. Kali Salwaar has been shown in many international film festivals, including the Indian Panorama in the International Film Festival of India, Goteborg Film Festival, Rotterdam International Film Festival (2003) and Durban International Film Festival (2003). It was nominated for 'Best Film' at the Bogota film festival.

In her own words: "Perhaps cinema is the best form to show the unfolding of Destiny. Destiny, not as predetermined fate, but as it is getting made – as an unfolding of time and events within time. It gets made as people meet and exchange – a few words, or a look, or money. Seemingly inconsequential encounters change you forever and each time. In Kali Salwaar, I try to come close to this pulse of random movement and imperceptible ‘happening’".

== Filmography ==
=== Short films ===
Year	Title	Notes
1989	Hawa Ka Rang	
1994	Paitrik Sampati	
1994	Yaadon Ke Kinaare	

=== Documentary films ===
Year	Title	Notes
1991	Bhavatarana	Worked as a Screenwriter only.
1995	In Search of Greener Pastures	

=== Feature films ===
Year	Title	Notes
1991	Kasba	Worked as a Screenwriter only.
2002	Kali Salwaar	
