= Sonal Sehgal =

Indian actress

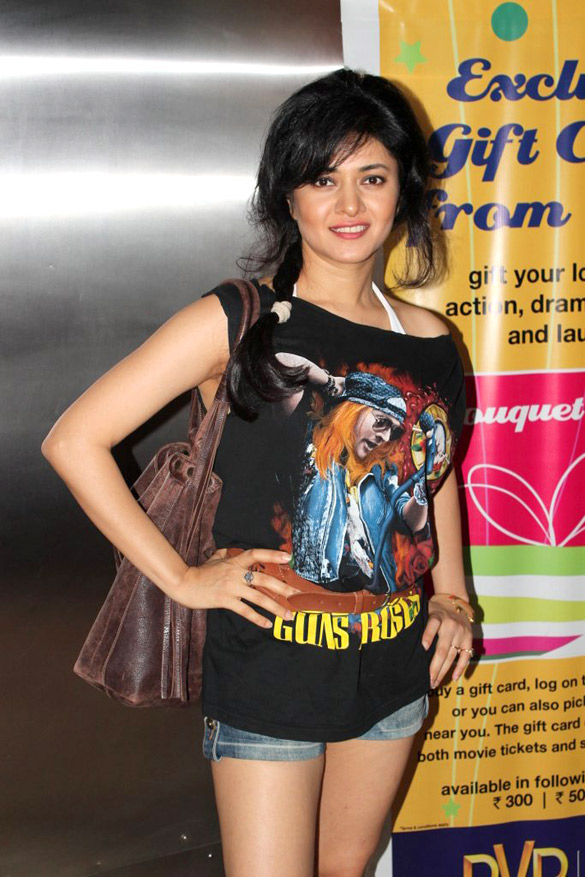
- Sonal Sehgal in 2012
- Born: 13 July 1981 (age 45)
- Occupation: Actress
- Years active: 2001–2020
- Spouse: Naresh Kamath (m. 2011)

Sonal Sehgal (born 13 July 1981) is an Indian actress who debuted on the silver screen with the critically acclaimed Aashayein (film) directed by the national award-winning director Nagesh Kukunoor where she was cast opposite John Abraham. She went on to play lead roles in films like Future to bright hai ji (2012), Mantostaan (2017), and Lihaaf (2019).

== Personal life ==
She married Naresh Kamath in 2011. The couple divorced in 2025. Before pursuing an acting career, Sehgal assisted ad filmmaker and director Pradeep Sarkar who made his film debut with Parineeta. She also worked as a copywriter for leading advertising agencies in Delhi. The actress turned into a producer with Indo-Latvian sci-fi thriller Manny in which she played a lead role opposite Russian actor Jurijs Dyakonovs.

== Career ==
=== Films ===
Aashayein was directed by the national award-winning director Nagesh Kukunoor. Sehgal was cast opposite John Abraham, who played the dying protagonist. Sehgal played the pillar of strength and the only ray of hope in the dying man's life. Radio is a drama, featuring a complex relationship between a man, his ex-wife (played by Sehgal), and his current girlfriend.

Future to bright hai ji, although a disappointment at the box office, earned great reviews. It is a comedy about a couple from a small town (played by Aamir Bashir and Sonal Sehgal) who come to Mumbai to try their luck in Bollywood. It is a hilarious account of their trials and tribulations. Sehgal penned the lyrics of the title song of the same film. In Rahat Kazmi's Mantostaan, based on the works of celebrated writer Saadat Hasan Manto, she played the leading role.

Sonal plays the lead role in and has also co written the screenplay of "Lihaaf", along with director Rahat Kazmi. The film based on Ismat Chugtai's story of the same name, is produced by Oscar Winner Marc Baschet.

Sonal turned Producer with MANNY 2020. The feature film directed by Latvian director Dace Puce, was written and produced by Sehgal who also played the leading role.

In 2025 she Wrote and Executive Produced THE GREAT DEPARTURE in which she starred opposite Xavier Samuel (BLONDE, 2022). The film released theatrically in France to a great response from audience and critics

=== Television ===
She began her career with theatre and television. She had a pivotal role in the celebrated theater scriptwriter/director Mahesh Dattani's play Mad about Money. She also had lead roles in the television serials Saara Akaash and Hotel Kingston, in which she played diverse characters. These programs aired back-to-back from 2005 to 2007. In Saara Akash, she played an undercover spy on the Indian Air force base who lost her heart to a pilot. The audience loved to hate her and then fell in love with her. In Hotel Kingston, she played a spoiled brat who inherited her father's hotel and managed it incompetently. The character was a brat with a golden heart who the audience adored.

== Filmography ==
=== Films ===
Year	Film	Role	Notes
2005	U, Bomsi & Me	Monica	
2008	Ghajini	Model	
2009	Radio	Puja Talwar	
2010	Jaane Kahan Se Aayi Hai	Natasha	
2010	Aashayein	Nafisa	
2011	Damadamm!	Sanjana	
2012	Future to Bright Hai Ji	Sonia Singh	
2017	Mantostaan	Kalwant Kaur	
2020	Forbidden Love	Writer	ZEE5 original film
2020	Manny	Maya	
2025	The Great Departure	Mansi	

=== Television ===
Year	Serial	Role	Channel
2001	Deewane Toh Deewane Hain		Zee TV
2003–2004	Saara Akaash	Naaz / Sanjana Malik	Star Plus
2004	Kasautii Zindagii Kay	Advocate Madhavi Bose	Star Plus
2004–2005	Hotel Kingston	Shelly Sahay	Star One
2006	Jassi Jaissi Koi Nahin	Shiuli	Sony Entertainment Television

== Music ==
Sonal Sehgal worked on many Hindi and Punjabi music albums from 2001 to 2003. Her notable songs include Chadi Jawani with Jassy B, Ghungat by Pankaj Udhas, Botla Sarab Diyan with Bally Sagoo, Harbhajan Maan and many more.

Sonal has written lyrics for the title track of the film Future to Bright Hai ji (2012). She also wrote the lyrics of the 2018 single "Saawariya", composed by Naresh Kamath and sung by Shilpa Rao.

== Books ==
- The Day That Nothing Happened (2018), a fictional story about people who travel to a 'Multiverse'
