= Polyplex (company) =

Indian packaging film company

Polyplex Corporation Ltd
- Company type: Public
- Traded as: BSE: 524051; NSE: POLYPLEX
- Industry: Packaging
- Founded: 1984
- Founder: Sanjiv Saraf
- Headquarters: Noida, Uttar Pradesh, India
- Area served: Worldwide
- Products: Plastic and Polyester Film
- Brands: Sarafil; Saracote; Saralam; Saraprint
- Revenue: ▲₹6,752 crore (US$700 million) (FY22)
- Net income: ▲₹568 crore (US$59 million) (FY22)
- Website: www.polyplex.com

Polyplex Corporation Ltd. is an Indian multinational company which produces biaxially oriented polyester (BoPET) film for packaging, electrical and various industrial applications.

The company is a major exporter of PET film to the United States, Europe, Southeast Asia, South America and Australia.

== Manufacturing facilities ==
It has manufacturing facilities in India, Thailand, Turkey, the US, and Indonesia. The company, headquartered in Noida, adjacent to New Delhi, operates six manufacturing facilities through its own operations and subsidiaries:

1. In Khatima, in the state of Uttarakhand, India
2. In Bajpur, in the state of Uttarakhand, India
3. In Rayong province, Thailand (operated by a subsidiary)
4. In Tekirdağ, Turkey (operated by a subsidiary)
5. In Decatur, Alabama in the USA (operated by a Subsidiary)
6. In Serang, Banten in Indonesia (operated by a subsidiary)
