= Manto Ke Afsanay =

Collection of short stories by Sadat Hasan Manto

- 2008 edition
- Author: Saadat Hasan Manto
- Original title: Manto Ke Afsanay
- Language: Urdu
- Publication date: 1940 (first edition)
- Publication place: British India
- Media type: Print

Manto Ke Afsanay (lit. 'Stories of Manto') is a collection of short stories in Urdu by Saadat Hasan Manto . It was first published in 1940. Rekhta has the largest collection of 233 stories written by Saadat Hasan Manto.

== Background ==
Manto Ke Afsanay was first published in 1940 from Lahore. This was the Manto’s second collection of original short stories. His first publication was titled Atish Paray. Included in this second collection are new stories and also some reprints of stories such as Tamasha (Spectacle), Taqat ka imtahan (Trial of power) and Inqilabi (Revolutionary). The reprints are necessary as these stories were excluded in the later editions of the first publication.

== Content ==
The stories in this collection include:

- Naya Qanun (New Law or New Constitution) (Note: first published in Humayun in May 1938.)
- Shaghl (Amusement)
- Khushiya (Khushiya)
- Banjh (Barren)
- Na’rah (The Slogan)
- Shah nasin par (On the balcony)
- Us ka pati (Her Husband)
- Tamasha (Spectacle) (Note: first published under a pseudonym in Abdul Bari Alig’s Urdu newspaper Khalq (Creation) and later in Atish Paray; dropped in later editions.)
- Taqat ka imtahan (Test of Strength) (Note: first published in Atish Paray; dropped in later editions.)
- Inqilabi (Revolutionary) (Note: a reprint of Inquilab Pasand first published in the Aligarh Magazine in March 1935 and later in Atish Paray; dropped in later editions.)
- Istudant yubyan kaimp (Student union camp) (Note: dropped in later editions.)
- Sharabi (Drunkard) (Note: dropped in later editions.)
- Shushu (Shushu)
- Mera aur uska intiqam (My revenge and hers)
- Mausam ki sharat (the playfulness of the season)
- Begu (Begu)
- Phaha (Bandage)
- Mantar (Mantra)
- Tehri lakir (Crooked line)
- Mom batti ke ansu (The tears of the wax candle)
- Diwali ke diye (The diwali lights)
- Pahchan (Discernment)
- Darpok (Coward)
- Das rupaye (Ten Rupees)
- Misiz di Kosta (Mrs. Dicosta)
- Blauz (Blouse) (Note: a later addition to the collection, it did not appear in the first edition.)

== Themes ==
The themes of Manto’s stories show considerable variation. Stories such as Inqilabi (Revolutionary), Sharabi (Drunkard) and Istudant yubyan kaimp (Student union camp) deal with political issues with characters who identify as revolutionaries or activists. Naya Qanun (New Law) explores the character of Ustaad Mongu, a tonga-driver and the political atmosphere in India in the backdrop of the commencement of Government of India Act 1935. Tamasha (Spectacle), first published in Rusi Afsare (Russian Stories) and later in Atish Paray dealt with the Jallianwala Bagh massacre.

Manto explores the theme of social realism in stories such as Shaghl (Amusement), Na’rah (The Slogan) and Das rupaye (Ten Rupees). Influenced from Maxim Gorky’s Twenty-six Men and a Girl, Shaghl deals with the abduction of a girl by some rich men. In Das rupaye (Ten Rupees), he depicts the life of Sarita, an innocent young girl who works as a part time prostitute.

Manto also depicted romance in some of his stories such as Shushu (Shushu) and Mera aur uska intiqam (My revenge and hers), both of which dealt with teenage love.

== Cited sources ==
- Flemming, Leslie A. (1985). Another Lonely Voice: The Life and Works of Saadat Hassan Manto. Vanguard Books.
- Flemming, Leslie A. (1985b). "Manto Bibliography". Journal of South Asian Literature. 20 (2): 152–160. ISSN 0091-5637. JSTOR 40872787.
- Rumi, Raza (2012). "Reclaiming Humanity: Women in Manto's Short Stories". Social Scientist. 40 (11/12): 75–86. ISSN 0970-0293. JSTOR 23338872.
- Jalil, Rakhshanda (2012). "Loving Progress, Liking Modernity, Hating Manto". Social Scientist. 40 (11/12): 43–52. ISSN 0970-0293. JSTOR 23338869.
- Jalal, Ayesha (2013). The Pity of Partition: Manto's Life, Times, and Work across the India-Pakistan Divide. Princeton University Press. ISBN 978-1-4008-4668-9.
