= Jashn-e-Rekhta =

Urdu language literary festival

Jashn-e-Rekhta جشنِ ریختہ
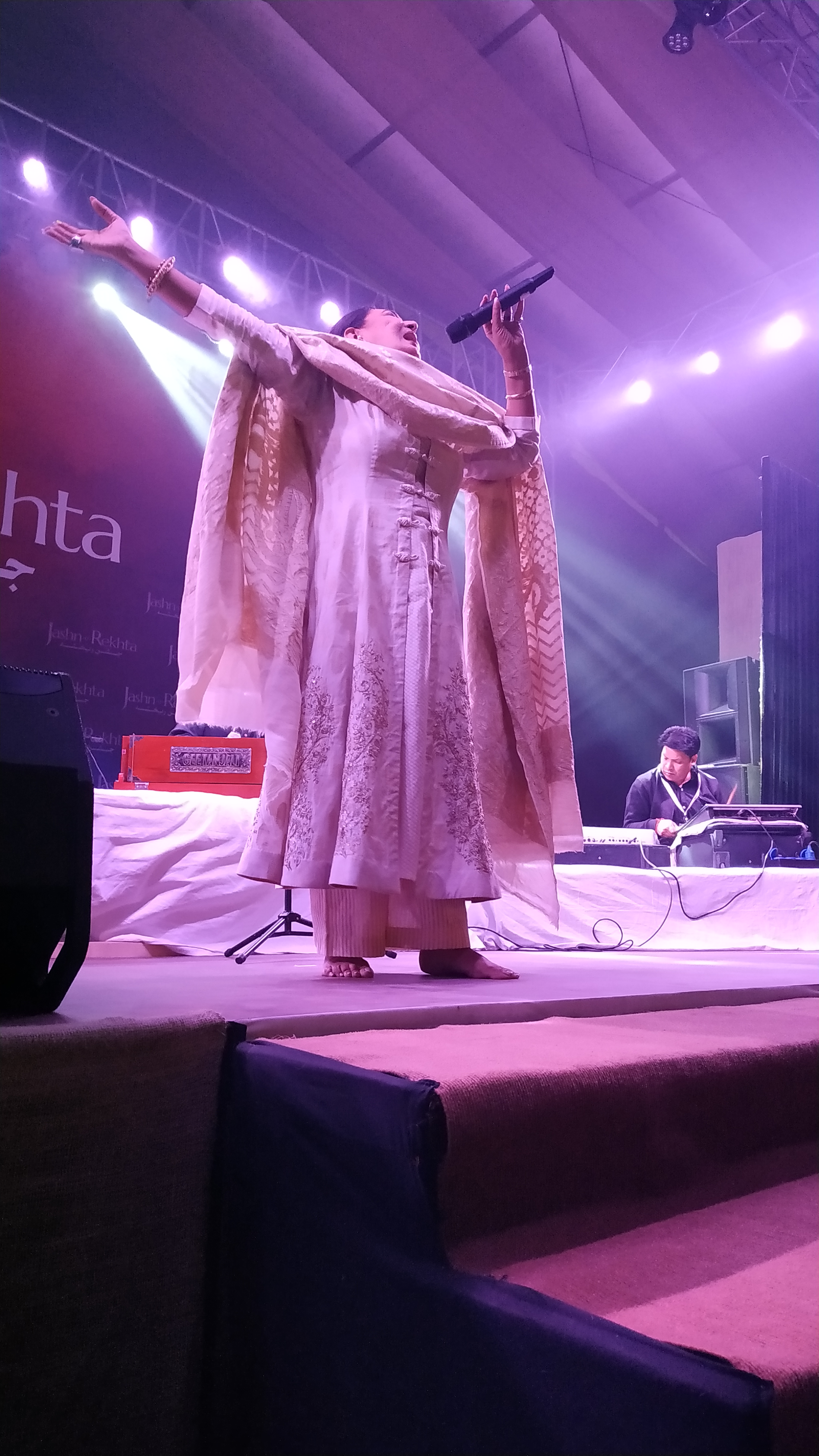
- Jaspinder Narula performing at Jashn-e-Rekhta 2019
- Status: Active
- Genre: Literary festival
- Frequency: Annual
- Location: Delhi
- Country: India
- Years active: 2015 – present
- Organiser: Rekhta Foundation
- Website: https://jashnerekhta.org/

Jashn-e-Rekhta (Urdu: جشنِ ریختہ, lit. 'Celebration of Rekhta', Hindi: जश्न-ए-रेख़्ता) is the world's largest Urdu language literary festival. It is a three-day event held in New Delhi that celebrates Urdu language. This event has been the flagship event of the Rekhta Foundation. The festival showcases Urdu poetry, Urdu literature, Qawwali, and Islamic calligraphy, with performances such as Ghazal, Sufi music, recitations, panel discussions, debates, conversations on films, and calligraphy workshops. It also includes shopping and food festivals. It provides a platform for Urdu lovers to share their poetry and stories in various open forums. The slogan of the festival is "Celebrating Urdu", and it is attended by a huge number of Urdu enthusiasts, including younger people.

== History ==
The festival was first held in 2015. It is organised by the Rekhta Foundation, a non-profit organization that is devoted to the preservation and promotion of the Urdu language and culture.

== Notable participants ==
Jashn-e-Rekhta has seen participation from dozens of Urdu writers and prominent names from the film, music and TV industry from India, Pakistan, and the United States, including:

- Soyam Singh
- Kumar Vishwas
- Zia Mohyeddin
- Javed Akhtar
- Imtiaz Ali
- Muzaffar Ali
- Tom Alter
- Shabana Azmi
- Wasim Barelvi
- Rekha Bhardwaj
- Wadali Brothers
- Prem Chopra
- Nandita Das
- Shamsur Rahman Faruqi
- Ali Akbar Natiq
- Nida Fazli
- Gulzar
- Hans Raj Hans
- Intizar Hussain
- Rahat Indori
- Javed Jaffrey
- Pandit Jasraj
- Prasoon Joshi
- Annu Kapoor
- Irrfan Khan
- Rafaqat Ali Khan
- Ustad Amjad Ali Khan
- Ustad Hamid Ali Khan
- Ustad Rashid Khan
- Anwar Maqsood
- Anwar Masood
- Shubha Mudgal
- Gopi Chand Narang
- Munawwar Rana
- Shilpa Rao
- Waheeda Rehman
- Nawazuddin Siddiqui
- Sharmila Tagore
- Maithili Thakur
- Amish Tripathi
- Harshdeep Kaur
- Zakir Khan
- Kumar Vishwas
- Saeed Naqvi
- Manoj Muntashir
- Mahmood Farooqui
- Syed Sahil Agha
- Rehman Musawwir
- Sukhan
- Om Bhutkar
- Varun Grover
- Kailash Kher

== Critical views ==
Jashn-e-Rekhta received criticism from various corners due to its emphasis on Devanagari script and Roman script in expressing the Urdu literature. Rizwan Ahmad argued that "The first few editions did not have the Jashn-e-Rekhta written in Urdu. Recent ones did include the Urdu script, but the schedules were available only in English. The big ‘I LOVE URDU’ cut-out where the youth were seen taking pictures was only in English. Both speak volumes about the targeted audience".

== See also ==
- Rekhta Foundation
- Sukhan
