= Sukhan =

Theatrical production by Om Bhutkar

Sukhan सुख़न
- Origin: Pune, Maharashtra, India
- Genres: Poetry Recitation, Hindustani Classical Music, Ghazal, Qawwali
- Years active: 2015-present
- Members: Om Bhutkar; Nachiket Devasthali; Abhijeet Dhere; Devendra Bhome; Jaydeep Vaidya; Mukta Joshi; Ketan Pawar; Mandar Bagade; Anup Kulthe; Kalyani Deshpande
- Website: sukhanmehfil.com

Sukhan is a theatrical production that presents Hindustani literature and classical music. Conceived and directed by National-Award winning Marathi actor Om Bhutkar, the show was first performed on 13 October 2015 to commemorate the 67th birth anniversary of Ustad Nusrat Fateh Ali Khan. The performers in the opening show were Nachiket Devasthali, Abhijeet Dhere, Jaydeep Vaidya, Devendra Bhome and others, including Om Bhutkar himself. Since its inception, Sukhan has been performed over 125 concerts.

== Title and Meaning ==
The word "Sukhan" (suKHan / सुख़न / سخن) comes from Persian and means speech, words, conversation, or poetry. It is commonly used in Urdu and Persian literary traditions to refer to eloquent expression, particularly in poetry.

In the context of the show Sukhan, it aligns with its essence— a space for poetry and Hindustani music, where words carry deep emotions and artistic expression.

== Form ==
Sukhan is a mehfil (gathering) where performers recite Urdu & Hindi poetry and render Hindustani classical music pieces, as well as Ghazals & Qawwalis. It combines the literature with musical renditions. The show also pays homage to legendary artists and poets of the Indian subcontinent, such as Mirza Ghalib, Mir Taqi Mir, Sahir Ludhianvi and many more.

Though it is an Urdu show, interestingly, the performers of Sukhan are originally based in Pune, Maharashtra. Pune has primarily Marathi-speaking residents, and all the artists in Sukhan share Marathi as their mother tongue.

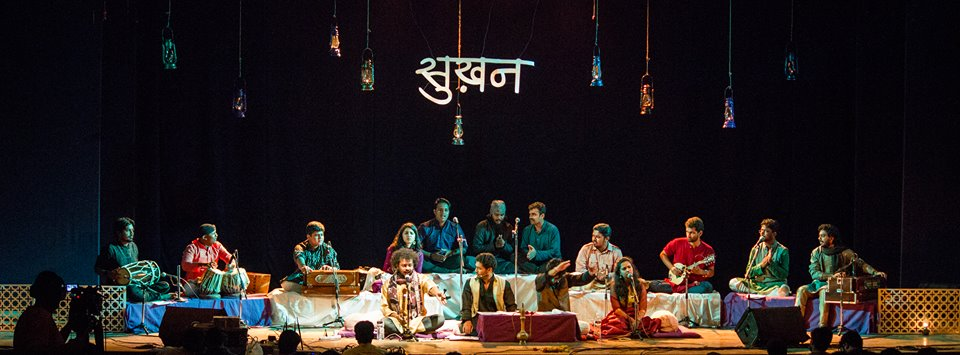

== Performances and Recognition ==
Initially, the show was performed mainly in Pune, gaining local popularity. Over time, its success led to performances in Mumbai and other cities near Pune, expanding its reach beyond its original audience.

In February 2017, Sukhan was invited to perform at Jashn-e-Rekhta, one of India's most prestigious events dedicated to Urdu literature. This performance was a significant milestone, highlighting the show's cultural impact and growing recognition. They were again invited to perform in the same festival in December 2017. They performed at Jashn-e-Rekhta in December 2024 after 7 years since they last performed here.

In January 2018, Sukhan was performed in Pune International Film Festival as a part of the PIFF Forum. Later in 2018, Sukhan was invited to perform at the Akhil Bhartiya Marathi Natya Sammelan organised by Akhil Bharatiya Marathi Natya Parishad, held in Mulund, Mumbai. This invitation to a prominent Marathi theater festival showcased the show's ability to bridge linguistic and cultural boundaries.

Since its debut, it has been performed in various cities in India as well as in USA, Canada and UAE. and has attracted audiences from diverse linguistic and cultural backgrounds. The show has been featured at prestigious festivals: twice at Jashn-e-Rekhta, Delhi & Vishwarang, Bhopal. It was also performed at prestigious 'The Grand Theatre' in NMACC, Mumbai.

== Impact on Pune's art scene ==
Despite Marathi being the predominant language in Pune, Sukhan has significantly influenced the city's artistic community and audience. It has sparked a revival of interest in Urdu poetry, evident in various cultural expressions.

== Reception ==
Sukhan has garnered widespread acclaim for its innovative blend of literature and Hindustani classical music.

Bollywood actress Mrunal Thakur, after attending a performance at NMACC, Mumbai expressed her admiration, stating that she loved the entire atmosphere created in the mehfil and expressed her desire 'to be that repeat audience attending Sukhan's future performances again and again.

Actress Amruta Subhash also lauded the initiative, noting that learning Urdu opened up a whole new world for her, allowing her to appreciate the depth of ghazals and shayari.

The production has been featured in prominent media outlets. The Asian Age highlighted Sukhan's role in bringing together young Marathi artists to celebrate Urdu literature, creating a unique and unforgettable mehfil.

Additionally, Gujarati Mid-Day emphasized the show's dedication to Urdu literature and Sufi music, offering audiences an immersive cultural experience.

Maharashtra Times commended Om Bhutkar's dedication to promoting the beauty of the Urdu language through "Sukhan," noting his efforts in making the language accessible and appreciated by a broader audience.

Sakal praised the production for its remarkable success, stating that the tickets for Sukhan often sell out within minutes, especially in Pune—an impressive feat for a show centered around Urdu literature. The publication also noted that while the show has gained immense popularity among young audiences, it has also captivated elderly attendees, making it a rare intergenerational cultural experience.

== Jashn-e-Sukhan ==
In 2017, the organizers of Sukhan launched Jashn-e-Sukhan, a festival celebrating poetry and music. Unlike Sukhan, which primarily focuses on Urdu literature and Hindustani classical music, Jashn-e-Sukhan embraces diversity in languages and genres. The festival serves as a platform for emerging poets and musicians. Over the years, it has also featured performances by acclaimed artists such as Jasraj Joshi, Vishal Bagh, Nihira Joshi, Anjali Marathe, Gautami Deshpande, Avanti Patel and Shamika Bhide.

== See also ==
- Om Bhutkar
- Jashn-e-Rekhta
- Nachiket Devasthali
