= Thanda Gosht =

Fiction short story by Saadat Hasan Manto, published in 1950

- Short story by Saadat Hasan Manto
- Language: Urdu
- Genre: fiction

Publication
- Published in: 1950
- Publisher: Sang-e-Meel Publications
- Media type: Short story

Thanda Gosht (Urdu: ٹھنڈا گوشت ALA-LC: Ṭhanḍā Gos̱ẖt IPA: [ʈʰənɖɑː ɡoːʃt̪], English: Cold Flesh) is a short story written by Saadat Hasan Manto. The book was first published in a literary magazine in March 1950 in Pakistan. Later it was published by Sang-e-Meel Publications. Manto was charged with obscenity for this story and faced a trial in a criminal court.

== Storyline ==
The story is about the communal violence of 1947. Ishwar Singh fails to make love to his mistress Kalwant. She suspects him of infidelity and in a fit of jealousy stabs him with his own dagger. While dying, Ishwar Singh admits his crime getting involved in riots which broke out in his village, killing a Muslim family with the same dagger and abducting a Muslim girl after breaking in their house and attempting to rape her, who was actually dead. Hence the title "cold flesh".

== Adaptations ==
Mantostaan, a 2017 Indian film which adapted four short stories of Manto for the screen also included a segment based on "Thanda Ghosht". Other stories which were adapted included "Khol Do", "Assignment", and "Akhiri Salute". Manto, a 2018 Indian biographical drama film about Saadat Hasan Manto's later life includes an adaptation of Thanda Gosht and the long-drawn court trials on obscenity which followed, their severe toll on his health and finances.
