= Atish Paray =

- Author: Sadat Hasan Manto
- Original title: Atish Paray
- Language: Urdu
- Publisher: Urdu Bookstall (Lahore)
- Publication date: 1936 (first edition)
- Publication place: British India
- Media type: Print

Atish Paray (Urdu: آتش پارے, lit. 'Nuggets of Fire') is a collection of short stories by Saadat Hasan Manto.

== Background ==
Atish Paray subtitled “a collection of several thought-provoking stories” was published in 1936 from Lahore, while Manto was living in Amritsar. Two stories from this collection Tamasha - Manto's debut story followed by Taqat Ka Imtehan first appeared in a local weekly Khalq (Creation) by Abdul Bari Alig from Amritsar. Manto dedicated this collection to his late father.

== Content ==
There are eight stories in this collection:

- Khooni Thook (Bloody Spit)
- Inqalab Pasand (Revolutionary) (Note: first published in the Aligarh Magazine in March 1935)
- Ji Aaya Sahab (Coming Sir) (Note: It was later included in Manto Ke Afsanay under the title Qasim with a slight change in the ending)
- Mahigir (Fisherman) (Note: also included in his prior collection Rusi Afsanay (Russian Stories))
- Tamasha (Spectacle) (Note: first published under a pseudonym in Abdul Bari Alig’s Urdu newspaper Khalq (Creation) and also included in his prior collection Rusi Afsanay (Russian Stories))
- Taqat ka Imtehan (Test of Strength) (Note: It was included in Manto Ke Afsanay)
- Deewana Shayr (Mad Poet)
- Chori (Theft)

== Cited sources ==
- Flemming, Leslie A. (1985). Another Lonely Voice: The Life and Works of Saadat Hassan Manto. Vanguard Books.
- Flemming, Leslie A. (1985b). "Manto Bibliography". Journal of South Asian Literature. 20 (2): 152–160. ISSN 0091-5637. JSTOR 40872787.
