= Shikwa Jawab Shikwa =

2017 Poetry Book by Anjum Lucknowi

Shikwa and Jawab e Shikwa
- Author: Anjum Lucknowi
- Original title: شکوہ جواب شکوہ
- Language: Urdu
- Subject: Urdu literature
- Genre: Poerty Book
- Published: 2017 in Urdu language
- Publisher: Mustaqeem Inter College
- Publication date: October 1, 2017
- Publication place: India
- Pages: 43
- Award: Dr. Allama Iqbal Award 2017
- ISBN: 9798215710456
- Text: Shikwa and Jawab e Shikwa online

The Shikwa Jawab Shikwa is a 2017 Urdu poetry book collection by Anjum Lucknowi ''Muhammad Iqbal Khan'', published by Mustaqim Inter College, Sultanpur district , India. The book consists of 43 pages and was awarded the Dr. Allama Iqbal Award (2017).

== Overview ==
Shikwa Jawab Shikwa is the second Urdu poetry collection by Anjum Lucknowi, published in 2017. The book is divided into two parts: Shikwa (Complaint) and Jawab-e-Shikwa (Response to Complaint). In Shikwa, the poet expresses human complaints to God, and in Jawab-e-Shikwa, God's responses are presented.

This Shikwa Jawab-e-Shikwa is separate from Allama Iqbal's famous work. It is completely independent, though the structure of the poem follows the same arrangement. However, the verses and content are entirely different.

== Content ==
The book contains a total of 53 poems: 26 in Shikwa and 27 in Jawab-e-Shikwa. The poems explore spiritual dilemmas, human struggles, and divine guidance, reflecting both timeless philosophical questions and the challenges of the modern era.

Shikwa Javab e Shikwa (Roman Urdu)

- Shikwa

Teri rehmat ko na kyun deedah par nam dhoondhe
Hai jise teri zarurat wohi paiham dhoondhe
Phool ko gulshan-e-hasti mein bhi shabnam dhoondhe
Khald-e-Adam ko kabhi khald ko Adam dhoondhe

Shikwa-e-‘abd bhi sun kar tera parda na utha
Teri marzi to mujhe jalwa dikha ya na dikha

Talib-e-madh tha ab talib-e-shikwa mein hoon
Jo hai darya ka talabgar woh qatra mein hoon
Tu hai ma’bud mera aur tera banda mein hoon
Malik-e-husn hai tu ishq ka jalwa mein hoon

Apne ‘ashiq ko mohabbat ki saza kis ne di
Bar sar-dar-e-ana al-haq ki sada kis ne di

Musht bhar khaak se aur hasti-e-Adam ka wujood
Maine maana yeh teri karigari hai ma’bud
Aur farishte, pas Adam bhi hue sar-ba-sajood
Hain usi nasal se kyun kar yeh musalman o hind

Kuch Nasiri hain, Nasara bhi hain Isaai bhi
Jaz mere karte hain kya teri pazeerai bhi

Tere kalme ka bhi aelan kiya hai humne
Kitni qaumon ko musalman kiya hai humne
Qaryah qaryah tujhe zishan kiya hai humne
Marhala sakht tha aasaan kiya hai humne

Hum agar haq par hain to arsh se aawaz to de
Ya bulale humein aur quwwat-e-parwaaz to de

Naam masjid hai tera ghar jo bana rakha hai
Farsh-e-‘ismat ko bhi sajdon se saja rakha hai
Yaad maine bhi tujhe waqt-e-dua rakha hai
Par duaon mein asar tu ne bhi kiya rakha hai

Jeene wale ko dua deta hoon mar jata hai
Mere iman ka shiraza bikhar jata hai

Mein tere naam ki tasbeeh padha karta hoon
Sajda-e-shukr ba-sad shauq ada karta hoon
Mein behr-e-haal tujhe raazi raza karta hoon
Bakhsh de meri khataein yeh dua karta hoon

Tu agar hai to amal ki mere taeed bhi kar
Jari mere liye to chashma-e-tawheed bhi kar

Lamakan tu hai haram, asal tera ghar bhi nahi
Woh kaisa masjid ya mandir bhi nahi
Tere rehne ki jagah yeh dil muztar bhi nahi
Noor jab tu hai tera phir koi humsar bhi nahi

Chaand samjhoon tujhe, sooraj ya sitara samjhoon
Koi pehchan bata, kuch to ishara samjhoon

Haq tujhe maan liya khud-ra hai ‘abid ban kar
Bandagi ki hai teri waqi‘ zaahed ban kar
Da’watain baanti teray deen ka qaasid ban kar
Jo mukhalif hua lada baithe mujahid ban kar

Har jagah parcham-e-tawheed ko gaara kis ne
Bab-e-Khyber ko do ungli se ukhaara kis ne

Naam zinda rahe hai tera ke uthai uftaad
Jab sunai to sunai tujhe apni rodaad
Tegh-e-baatil se nihatta lada ban kar foolaad
Mud ke dekha na kabhi ghar ki taraf waqt-e-jihad

Fauj-e-a’da na rahi, jung ke manzar badle
Meri thokar se hi pathar ke muqaddar badle

Maine kirdar-e-zamane ka palatte dekha
Tera phaila hua Islam simatte dekha
Tu ne kab jung mein peeche mujhe hat-te dekha
Kat gaya mera gala, to ne bhi kat-te dekha

Aasman meri duaon se kahin door na tha
Ran mein majboor tha, main to koi majboor na tha

Tera adni sa karishma hai sabhi shajar o hajar
Tu ne paida kiye daryaaon mein bhi la’l o gaher
Itni fursat bhi na di dekh-ta saare manzar
Mujhko daurata raha haath mein parcham-e-digar

Tere Islam ki tabligh mere dam se hui
Teri duniya ki shuruaat bhi Adam se hui

Lat o Uzza o Hubal ka tu bada lashkar tha
Ghasbana jahan qabza tha, woh tera ghar tha
Jab khudaai thi teri tab bhi khuda pathar tha
Goya takhleeq butaan ke liye ek azar tha

Hum ne toofan-e-nahusat ki raush modhi hai
Ya’ni pathar ke khudaon ki kamar todi hai

Tera mehboob na hota to tera kya hota
Bandagi ka teri har mor pe sauda hota
Tujhko sajda nahi to phir ghair ka sajda hota
Kaisa lagta tujhe main kehta jo acha hota

Sun ke ye baat meri tujhe jalal aa jaata
Tujhe mehboob ka us waqt khayal aa jaata

Faqah karte hain musalman shikam-e-seer Hind
Shukr karte hain ada, phir bhi tera sar-ba-sajood
Kyun nahi dekhta jab har jagah tu hai maujood
Tujhko parwah nahi hai meri shayad ma’bud

Tu hai razzaaq, tu hi sabko ghiza deta hai
Phir mujhe kis liye tu bhooka sula deta hai

Zehan qasir hai ke main kaise gunahgar hua
Teri rehmat ka bahr-e-kaif talabgar hua
Phir bhi tera na kisi mor pe deedaar hua
Main to lazd hoon duniya mein, yeh bekaar hua

Tu hai ma’bud to bande se judaai kaisi
Jo mere kaam na aaye woh khudaai kaisi

Kya sitam hai tera pehle mujhe jannat didi
Maine maangi na thi khud apni khalafat didi
Apni man maani jo chahi woh wasiyat didi
Aur phir khald-e-badr ho, yeh ijaazat didi

Mujhko duniya mein bhatakne ke liye chhod diya
Tu ne ek mitti ke insan ka dil tod diya

Jab mitana hi tha kyun mujhe banaya tu ne
Kyun farishton se mera sajda karaya tu ne
Kyun bulandi pe baitha kar yun giraya tu ne
Kaisa ehsan tera jo ke jataya tu ne

Aye Khuda tu hi bata kya yeh teri marzi hai
Ye jo marzi hai teri is mein bhi khud-gurzi hai

Teri dharti hai magar surat dehqaan hum hain
Ek ek daana-e-gandum ke nigahbaan hum hain
Zeenat-e-ghuncha-e-gul bhi hain gulistaan hum hain
Teri duniya ki sajawat ke bhi samaan hum hain

Imtihan phir bhi humein se tera mansha kya hai
Teri rehmat ne gunaahgar ko samjha kya hai

Hum se pehle tere ‘alam ke ajab ‘alam the
Musht bhar khaak na thi aur na koi Adam the
Jab hui karigari teri wahan par hum the
Kya ibadat ke liye teri malaa’ik kam the

Hum ko be-wajah banaya, koi ehsaan nahi
Hum se pehle tu teri koi bhi pehchaan nahi

Mere aamaal bhale aur bure tu ne kiye
Kaam-e-ziba jo hain tujko woh tu ne kiye
Zakhm-e-maazi ke the dil mein jo hare tu ne kiye
Dar-e-ehsaas mere khote khare tu ne kiye

Teri marzi mein jo aaye wohi to karta hai
Phool se rang juda aur kabhi boo karta hai

Patte sahra pe agar eeriyan ragdi humne
Pyaas, pyaason ki bujhai hai ussi zam-zam ne
Baaliqeen-e-husn-e-amal dekh liya ‘aalam ne
Laj-e-Adam ki bacha rakhi hai ek Adam ne

Tu agar chahta, Kausar bhi pila sakta tha
Tashna lab ko lab-e-Kausar bhi bula sakta tha

Masjid-e-Aqsa par qabiz hain a’due Islam
Jung hum karte hain to karta hai humko nakaam
Ya’ni maqsad hai tera, hum rahein ho ke badnaam
Ab nahi chalta kahin naara-e-takbeer se kaam

Ye bata kab teri rehmat bhala saath aaegi
Masjid-e-Aqsa Palestine ke haath aaegi

Ye sadaqat hai tere naam pe iman rakha
Taaq dil pe tere ikhlaas ka Qur’an rakha
Tujhko mamduh kaha, dil ko sana khwaan rakha
Bazm-e-‘ismat mein tera zikr charaghaan rakha

Is mashaqqat ke ewaz tu ne mujhe khwaar kiya
Ye khata mujh se hui, maine tujhe pyaar kiya

Jurm kya hai mera, mahshar jo bapa hona hai
Itna maloom hai bande ko saza hona hai
Tujh se samjhauta bhi kiya, tujh se juda hona hai
Tu khafa ho ja, agar tujhe khafa hona hai

Jin o insaan mile dozakh mein jalane ke liye
Baqi har shai hai kya jannat mein sajane ke liye

---

- Jawab e Shikwa

Deedah-e-yaas tera kya mera jalwa dekhe
Chashm-e-iman meri raf’at ka tajalla dekhe
Kun faya kun na kabhi wa’da-e-farda dekhe
Koi ghash khaye koi Toor ko jalta dekhe

Tu meri shaan ka andaza na kar paega
Tu agar jalwa mera dekhega, jal jaega

Par a’yaan shikwa-e-bayani se hai seerat teri
Da’wa-e-madh na karwa hai haqeeqat teri
Arz-e-konin pe ek daagh hai khalqat teri
Sharh-e-izhaar-e-tamasha hai muhabbat teri

Kuch bhi zahir ho to Mansoor nahi ho sakta
Zarrah-e-nahis kabhi Toor nahi ho sakta

Patla khaak hai haami takabbur kaise
Raah ke zarron ko keh dega koi dar kaise
Door maazi mein hue ahl-e-tafakkur kaise
Woh the bande mere par tere tasawwur kaise

Kuch hain tareek dil, kuch haasil-e-tanweer bhi hain
Goya sahra mein Asad bhi hain, tu khanzeer bhi hain

Mera mehboob munaadi hai mere kalme ka
Jannati woh hai jo aadi hai mere kalme ka
Us ki jannat jo juhadi hai mere kalme ka
Tera kya, tu tu fasaadi hai mere kalme ka

Kankaron ne teri muthi mein padha hai kalma
Tu hai bojhal, na samjha mera kya hai kalma

Kaun se firqay ki masjid ke bhala baani ho
Tum Arab wale, Turk ho, ya ke Irani ho
Yeh kaho ahl-e-hadith ho, ke Reza khani ho
Da’wat-e-haq ho, ya tum khaadim-e-haqqani ho

Mere Quran mein in firqon ke to naam nahi
Jo Muhammad ka nahi, uska koi kaam nahi

Kab kaha maine ke tasbeeh rahe ward-e-zubaan
Sajda-e-shukr bhi lagta hai tujhe baar-garaan
Murtad deen ki alamat hai tera wahm o gumaan
Phir bhi bar waqt duaon pe hai apni nazaan

Ba-‘amal tu nahi, tu waaqif-e-taqleed nahi
Jazbah-e-shar bhi tera maayel-e-tameed nahi

Lamakan jab hoon, har ek jaa hai mere ghar ki tarah
Chaand, sooraj hain mere noor ke mehwar ki tarah
Main koi dasht o jabal hoon na samundar ki tarah
Mujh ko samjhe na koi, deo ke pathar ki tarah

Noor hoon, kab dil-e-momin se juda rehta hoon
Apne bandon ki main shah-e-rag mein chhupa rehta hoon

Haami-e-nafs hai tu, kab koi ‘aabid nikla
Nash’ah-e-may mein jo kho jaaye, woh zaahid nikla
Khud tera nama-e-aamaal, shawaahid nikla
Haq pe thehre na qadam, aisa mujahid nikla

Tu mujahid ki kisi khaak kaf-e-paa bhi nahi
Tera Islam nahi, tera pharera bhi nahi

Mera paighaam-e-‘amal jisko bhi maqsood hua
Woh bazahir kabhi Khalid, kabhi Mahmood hua
Jab zarurat padi, jis ki wohi maulood hua
Jo mukhalif hua, mera wohi Nimrod hua

Main agar chaahun to sooraj bhi nahi dhal sakta
Aag mein kaise Baraheem mera jal sakta

Woh to baatil tha jo kirdaar palatte dekha
Tu ne kab deen ki wus’at ko simatte dekha
Tujhko himmat di, tujhe haq se na hatt-te dekha
Main raza-mand tha, jo sar tera kat-te dekha

Is liye maine banaya tujhe sardar-e-jinaan
Meri marzi na samajh paayegi ‘aql-e-insaan

Jis ki tamsil nahi, aisi hai qudrat meri
Sang-reeze bhi kya karte hain madhat meri
Surah-e-Ikhlaas se zahir hai haqeeqat meri
Kul jahanon pe musallat hai hukoomat meri

Deen mera, teri tabligh ka mohtaaj nahi
Kaun si shai hai woh jis par ke mera raaj nahi

Tu ne Kaaba ko mere khana-e-asnaam kiya
Teen sau saath khudaon ne bada naam kiya
Teri kaawish ne tujhe mareed-e-Islam kiya
Par mere sher ki himmat ne bada kaam kiya

Mere mehboob ke kaandhon pe khara tha koi
Arsh-e-Azam ke tasawwur se bada tha koi

Farsh se Arsh talak jo hai, mujhe pyara hai
Jo mere hukum ka munkir hai, woh naakaara hai
Sirf ek zarb-e-kalimi ka yeh nazara hai
Gharaq-e-darya hua, Far’awn sitam haara hai

Meri wahdat ne ishara se kahan kaam liya
Mere sheedai ne har waqt mera naam liya

Mere ghar ko tu Baraheem ne tameer kiya
Tune to gir jaao but khane mein takseer kiya
Kaam jo tune kiya, laayak-e-takfeer kiya
Sab ko Mullah o Brahman ne garah-geer kiya

Jo Muhammad ﷺ ne bataya, woh ibadat na rahi
Apne waade par atal, kyun teri niyat na rahi

Hai mere noor se takhleeq-e-Rasool-e-Arabi
Kar le Quran mein tahqiqat-e-Rasool-e-Arabi
Ayatain karti hain tasdeeq-e-Rasool-e-Arabi
Ki hai nabiyon ne bhi tausheeq-e-Rasool-e-Arabi

Sun ae bande, teri har baat hamaqat hai
Mere mehboob ne bhi meri ibadat ki hai

Main ne Konein banai to banaye hain usool
Mujh se ae Adam kha ki tere shikway hain fazool
Yaad kar mera karam, ummat-e-Musa ko na bhool
Meri marzi se hua tha man o salwa ka nuzool

Kaun samjhega, kise rizq mein kya deta hoon
Koh mein rakh ke bhi keede ko ghiza deta hoon

Yaad kar ‘aalam-e-arwah ka waada apna
Bhool baitha hai faramosh madawa apna
Ya’ni talqeen-e-bakhud, da’wat-e-sajda apna
Mere bandon ko banata raha banda apna

Ahl-e-iman karein Far’awn ko kaise tasleem
Mere munkir pe musallat hai abhi zarb-e-kaleem

Shaakir az li jo guzre tere aabaa woh the
Laayak-e-sajda hoon main, maayel-e-sajda woh the
Bandagi ke liye koshish, dam-e-lamha woh the
Zehan-e-naqis na samajh payega kya kya woh the

Adam o Hawa se nisbat, jahan aaraai ki
Tu hai mustahaq saza, tune jo ruswaai ki

Khud-gurz mujhe jo samjhe, woh munafiq tu hai
Tujh mein iman nahi, faajir o faasiq tu hai
Pisar-e-Adam nahi, Iblees ka saabiq tu hai
Mere mehboob ka mera kahan aashiq tu hai

Kalma padh kar bhi na tu saahib-e-iman hua
La’natein tujh pe, to abtak na musalman hua

Arz-e-khaaki, yeh tujhe sahra o kahsaar diye
Nadyaan, khetiyaan, khulian o chaman-zaar diye
Bagh tujhe diye, sar-sabz hi ashjaar diye
Jitne ashjaar diye, woh bhi tu phal-daar diye

Tu jo haqq talfi karega, to pashimaan hoga
Hoon ge aamaal tere aur mera meezan hoga

Zarre zarre ki zubaan pe hai shahadat meri
Kaun samjhega, kahan tak hai hukoomat meri
Khud farishte na samajh paye, mashiyat meri
Ghair mumkin kisi but-gar se ibadat meri

Nasl-e-Adam pe agar main na bharosa karta
Tu hai kya cheez, main Adam ko na paida karta

Fikr naqis hai agar, fikr mutahhar bhi hai
Qalb tareek agar hai, to mannoor bhi hai
Adam khaaki bhi hai, paikar-e-humsar bhi hai
Ya’ni qatra jo hai, wus’at mein samundar bhi hai

Meri rehmat se tujhe bair hai, munkir tu hai
Zaahiri tor pe, dozakh ka musafir tu hai

Khaas banda hai mera, pisar-e-Baraheem hai woh
Kya sadaqat hai teri, laayak-e-ta’zeem hai woh
Meri rehmat ko har haal mein tasleem hai woh
Maalik-e-bagh-e-jinaan, maalik-e-Tasneem hai woh

Jo pasandeeda mere raste pe chal sakta hai
Woh jahan chahe wahan chashma ubal sakta hai

Naam shamil jo mera, naara-e-takbeer mein hai
Zor, lashkar mein hai, aur dhal mein, shamshir mein hai
Deen kaise mate, baatil isi tadbeer mein hai
Qaum-e-jhgi hui, ulama ki jo taqreer mein hai

Muttahid ho ke agar yeh kare baatil se jihad
Pal mein ho jaaye, na kyun Masjid-e-Aqsa azaad

Dil hai seene mein, magar junbish-e-iman nahi
Tera atuwaar o chalan, qari-e-Quran nahi
Main hoon mamduh tera, par tu sana-khwan nahi
Tu kisi mehfil-e-‘ismat mein bhi zishan nahi

Hain tere daaman, poshaak par daagh-e-asiyaan
Kaise mahshar mein chhupayega saraagh-e-asiyaan

Tu woh mujrim hai jo ahkaam-e-sana bhool gaya
Mere mehboob se aur mujh se wafa bhool gaya
Sun ke Quran-e-Muqaddas ki sada bhool gaya
Yaad aaraish dunya hai, qaza bhool gaya

Tu juda mujh se hai, tu mera milansaar nahi
Muttaqi Khald mein jaayenge, gunahgar nahi

Mere mehboob ki jis ne bhi itaat ki hai
Us ne panj waqtah namazon mein bhi shirkat ki hai
Sunnatein ki hain, ada, farz ibadat ki hai
Ek Muhammad hain, jinhein fikr bas ummat ki hai

Ummati ho to Muhammad ke parastaar raho
Qasar jannat hain tumhare, tumhein haqdaar raho

end

— Sir Anjum Lucknowi

=== Shikwa (Complaint) ===
In this section, the poet raises grievances before God, expressing the struggles, hardships, and apparent neglect faced by believers. The verses question why human suffering exists despite devotion, why Muslims endure decline despite their sacrifices, and why divine justice seems delayed. The tone combines reverence with protest, highlighting themes of spiritual longing, historical struggles of Muslims, and a search for divine mercy.

=== Jawab-e-Shikwa (Response to the Complaint) ===
Here, the Divine voice responds, reminding humanity of its responsibilities and moral duties. The reply emphasizes that decline results from human weakness, division, and forgetfulness of true faith rather than divine injustice. The verses urge self-discipline, unity, and adherence to the teachings of the Islamic prophet Muhammad. The response reassures believers that divine mercy and support are always present for those who uphold justice, sincerity, and faith.

Together, the poems reflect a timeless dialogue on the relationship between humanity and God, blending themes of devotion, accountability, and spiritual renewal while resonating with both classical tradition and modern challenges.

== Literary significance ==
Anjum Lucknowi's Shikwa Jawab e Shikwa is considered an important work in Urdu literature. It not only keeps the tradition of Allama Iqbal alive but also addresses current social, spiritual, and existential issues. The book earned the author the Dr. Allama Iqbal Award for his contribution to Urdu poetry.

== Publication ==
Shikwa Jawab-e-Shikwa, published in 2017, was released during the Sultanpur Kavi Sammelan held on 2017 at Kshatriya Bhavan, organized by Mastakim Inter College, Gyanpur. Renowned poets from across India participated, presenting works on social, political, and communal harmony. During the event, Poet Anjum Lucknowi was awarded the "Dr. Allama Iqbal Award."
