= Kali Salwar =

Kali Salwaar
- Directed by: Fareeda Mehta
- Screenplay by: Fareeda Mehta
- Based on: Kali Salwar by Saadat Hasan Manto
- Produced by: Andaaz Productions; National Film Development Corporation of India
- Starring: Sadiya Siddiqui; Irrfan Khan; Vrajesh Hirjee; Jeetu Shastri; Kay Kay; Ashok Banthia; Surekha Sikri; Sheeba Chaddha
- Cinematography: Avijit Mukul Kishore
- Edited by: Aseem Sinha
- Music by: Ved Nair
- Release date: 1 February 2002
- Running time: 112 minutes
- Country: India
- Language: Hindi

Kali Salwaar (transl. The Black Pants) is a 2002 Indian Hindi-language film directed by Fareeda Mehta, set in Mumbai, and starring Sadiya Siddiqui, Irrfan Khan, Kay Kay Menon, Vrajesh Hirjee in main roles.

The film is based on the 1961 short story of the same name by Saadat Hassan Manto, while also incorporating his other short stories as well; such as "Hatak", "Mohammad Bhai", and "Babu Gopinath". The interior of the film is painted by Indian painter Bhupen Khakhar. The stories take place in the underbelly of Bombay (now known as Mumbai).

== Synopsis ==
Sultana (Sadiya Siddiqui), a small town prostitute, and her pimp Khudabaksh migrate to the metropolis, bringing with them their dreams and meagre belongings. Initially, she is bewildered by the crowds and pace of the city. With the help of Anwari (a madam or perhaps a witch), she learns how to find her bearings. As she further encounters the city and its inhabitants, new perspectives open up - sad, comical, ironical but always mysterious. Sultana goes about her bright and artful seductions but somehow misses her targets. Her business collapses. Desperately, Khudabaksh too tries his hands at many jobs but is unsuccessful. His faith in his camera is replaced by his belief in a holy man. Sultana finds herself bereft and turns pensive. Her loneliness and despair get objectified in her desire for the 'kali salwaar' (black trousers) that she needs to complete her black ensemble for the observance of mourning in Moharram (an Islamic lunar calendar month).

One evening, as she solicits from her balcony, she beckons a man. This man, Shankar, inverts their relationship with his wit and worldly wisdom. The downtown and back streets where Sultana's story unfolds is peopled by 'characters' of varying hues, styles and make-up. One of these is the KRISHNA whose story converges with Sultana's though they never meet. Between all these people, goods, favours and money constantly change hands; and destinies are continuously transacted. From these chance meetings, seductive glances, elliptical encounters, graceful gestures and witticisms Kali Salwaar the film unfolds. Plot, colour, identities thicken and dissolve.

== Development ==
Kali Salwaar, based on the writings of Saadat Hasan Manto, marks Filmmaker Fareeda's directorial debut. An alumnus of the TISS, Mumbai from where she passed out in 1984 and the Film and Television Institute of India, Pune from where she graduated with specialization in Film Direction in 1989, it has been years of hard work in getting this film across to the screen. Consciously doing away with Manto's romanticized image of being drunk and depressed and creating legendary stories of the partition, Fareeda set about creating Manto's world through his characters using a contemporary setting to let audiences relate to issues like displacement and marginalization which are very valid even today. Manto has been used as a character in the film as he comes in and out of the frame interacting with his characters. A highlight of the film are the set interiors designed by well known artist Bhupen Khakhar.

The film co-produced by Andaaz Productions and the National Film Development Corporation of India was made on a budget of rupees 1.5 crores and merited production support from the Fonds Sud Cinema (The South Fund Agency of the French Ministry of Culture and Foreign Affairs) which promotes cinema from southern continents, the Goeteborg Film Festival Fund from Sweden and the Hubert Bals Fund based in the Netherlands.

The film is located in the working class areas of Bombay. Sultana's fate is echoed in the lifeless chimneys and jobless workers. As also in the pulsating markets where the energies of those who labour with their bodies constantly give life and rejuvenate that which is beaten down. The chawls, streets and alleys are mostly in the vicinity of the old textile mills (many of them now shut down). Fareeda says," We also shot in the actual red-light areas and other locations controlled by the Mafia. It was important for the actors to figure out the degree of stylization for herself/himself to be able to tread between naturalism and control so as to provide each 'character' with a mist enabling a double take on what was obviously 'seen'."

== Reception ==
Kali Salwaar has been shown in many international film festivals, including the Indian Panorama in the International Film Festival of India, Goteborg film festival, Rotterdam International film festival (2003) and Durban International Film Festival (2003). It was nominated for 'Best Film' at the Bogota film festival.

They said, "Fareeda captures the poetics of life, in which ornate Urdu and street slang alternate, friendship dispels loneliness, hope turns into despair, yet poverty is realistically harsh. She succeeds in weaving genres and symbols into the texture of life in such a way that the film is not only about Indian Muslim culture, but about a community of people living around a Mumbai bazaar, who share, to a certain extent, their memories, symbols, emotions, and desires."
