= Saadat Hasan Manto =

Pakistani writer (1912–1955)

Saadat Hasan Manto NI
- سعادت حسن منٹو
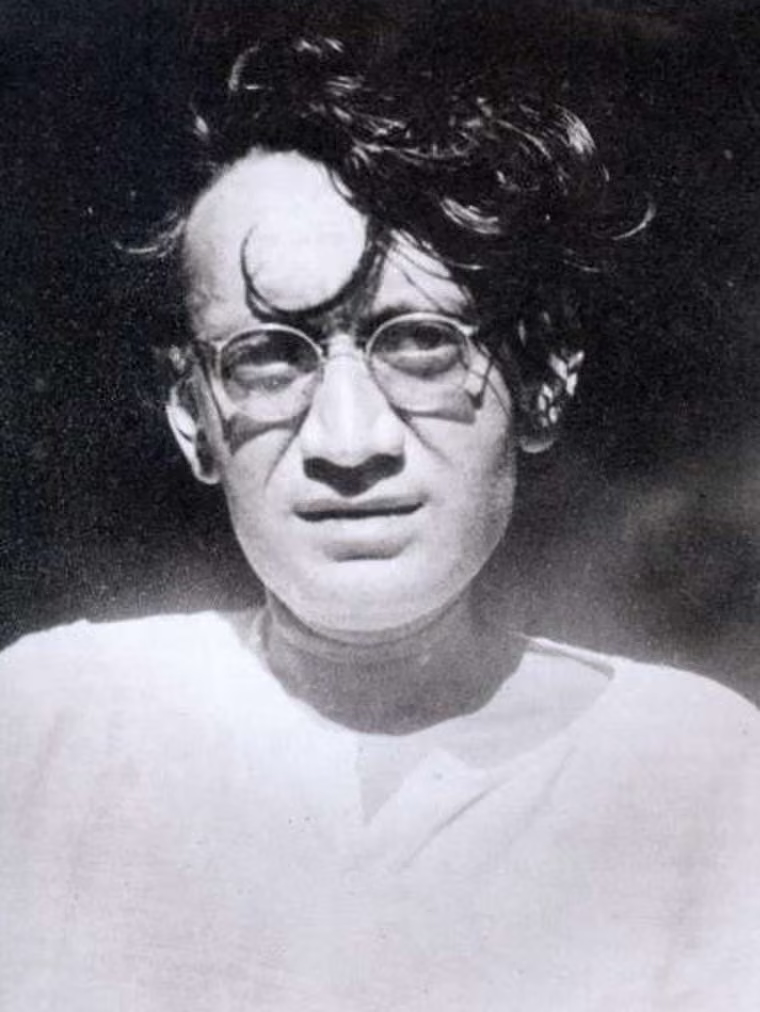
- Born: 11 May 1912; Samrala, Punjab, British India (present-day Punjab, India)
- Died: 18 January 1955 (aged 42); Lahore, West Punjab, Pakistan
- Resting place: Miani Sahib Graveyard, Lahore
- Citizenship: British Indian (1912–1947); Indian (1947–1948); Pakistani (1948–1955)
- Occupations: Novelist; playwright; essayist; screenwriter; short story writer
- Spouse: Safia Manto
- Children: Nighat Manto; Nusrat Manto; Nuzhat Manto
- Relatives: Saifuddin Kichlu; Masood Parvez; Abid Hassan Minto; Ayesha Jalal
- Writing career
- Years active: 1933-1955
- Period: 1934–1955
- Genres: Drama; nonfiction; satire; screenplays; personal correspondence
- Notable works: Toba Tek Singh; Thanda Gosht; Bu; Khol Do; Kaali Shalwar; Hattak
- Notable awards: Nishan-e-Imtiaz Award (Order of Excellence) in 2012 (posthumous)

Saadat Hasan Manto (Note: /mɑːn, -tɒ/; Punjabi, Urdu: سعادت حسن منٹو, Punjabi pronunciation: [s'aːdət (ɦ)əsən mənʈoː], Urdu pronunciation: [səˈaːd̪ət̪ ˈɦəsən ˈməɳʈoː]) NI (11 May 1912 – 18 January 1955) was a Pakistani writer, playwright and novelist from Punjab, who is regarded as the greatest short-story author in Urdu literature. He was active from 1933 during British rule till his death in 1955 after independence.

Writing mainly in Urdu, he produced 22 collections of short stories, a novel, five series of radio plays, three collections of essays, and two collections of personal sketches. His best short stories are held in high esteem by writers and critics. He is best known for his stories about the partition of India, which he opposed, immediately following independence in 1947. Manto's most notable work has been archived by Rekhta.

Manto was tried six times for alleged obscenity in his writings; thrice before 1947 in British India, and thrice after independence in 1947 in Pakistan, but was never convicted. He is acknowledged as one of the finest 20th-century Urdu writers and is the subject of two biographical films: the 2015 film Manto, directed by Sarmad Khoosat and the 2018 film Manto, directed by Nandita Das.

== Biography ==
=== Early life ===
Manto was born in the late British Raj at Paprodi village of Samrala in the Ludhiana district of British Punjab into a Punjabi Muslim family with Kashmiri ancestry on 11 May 1912. His trading family had settled in Amritsar in the early-nineteenth century and taken up the legal profession, with most in his family being barristers at the time of his birth. His father, Khwaja Ghulam Hasan, was a session judge of a local court. His mother, Sardar Begum, was of Pashtun ancestry and was the second wife of his father. Identifying as both Punjabi and Kashmiri, he claimed allegiance to his native Punjab and infamously remarked "Behind my Urdu, it's the Punjabi tongue that speaks" and upon his writing being accused of being obscene, he remarked "We Punjabis are madmen, but pure of heart"; and, in a letter to Jawaharlal Nehru, suggested that being 'beautiful' was the second meaning of being 'Kashmiri'.

=== Education and early career ===
He received his early education at a Muslim High School in Amritsar where he twice failed his matriculation examination. In 1931, he took admission at the Hindu Sabha College but dropped out after the first year due to poor results.

The big turning point in his life came in 1933, at age 21, when he met Abdul Bari Alig, a scholar and polemic writer who encouraged him to find his true talents and read Russian and French authors. Bari also encouraged Manto to translate Victor Hugo's The Last Day of a Condemned Man into Urdu which was later published by Urdu Book Stall, Lahore as Sarguzasht-e-Aseer (A Prisoner's Story). He then translated Oscar Wilde’s Vera into Urdu in 1934. He published his first original story in Urdu, Tamasha (Spectacle) under a pseudonym in Abdul Bari Alig's Urdu newspaper Khalq (Creation). It was based on the Jallianwala Bagh massacre. During this period he contributed to the daily newspaper Musawat, (Equality) and Ehsan (Kindness), both published from Amritsar. He also edited and translated Russian and French stories for the journals Alamgir and Humayun. On Bari's encouragement, these Russian stories were then published in Lahore under the title, Rusi Afsanay (Russian Stories). The collection included stories from Tolstoy, Gorky, and Chekhov and two of Manto's original stories, Tamasha (Spectacle) and Mahigir (Fisherman).

This heightened enthusiasm pushed Manto to pursue graduation at Aligarh Muslim University, which he joined in July 1934, and soon got associated with the literary circle who would later become members of the Indian Progressive Writers' Association (IPWA). It was here that he met writer Ali Sardar Jafri and found a new spurt in his writing. His second story, "Inqlaab Pasand", was published in Aligarh magazine in March 1935. His education at Aligarh was cut short when, nine months into joining the university, he was diagnosed with tuberculosis. He spent the next three months at a sanatorium at Batote in Kashmir to regain his health and then returned home to Amritsar.

After a brief stay in Amritsar, Manto moved to Lahore in search of employment and joined the newspaper Paras (Philosopher's Stone). In 1936, at Lahore, he published his first collection of original short stories Atish Paray (Nuggets of Fire).

In late 1936, he moved to Bombay when he received an invitation to edit the weekly Mussawir (Painter).

=== Career in Bombay (1937-1941) ===
In Bombay, Manto started his work as an editor of Mussawir along with Nazir Ludhianvi and the magazine Samaj (Society). He also started to write dialogues and scripts for the Hindi film industry, working first for the Imperial Film Company and then for Saroj Movietone. His films during this period include the 1940 film Apni Nagariya. He wrote many radio plays including Ao Radio Sunen (Come, Let's Listen to Radio) and Qalopatrah ki maut (Cleopatra's Death). In Bombay, he also came in contact with the Progressive Writers' Association and became friendly with progressive writers like Krishan Chander, Rajinder Singh Bedi and Ahmad Nadeem Qasmi.

In 1940 he published his second collection of short stories Manto Ke Afsanay (Stories of Manto) from Lahore.

In August 1940, he was dismissed from the editorship of Musawwir and started working for another magazine called Karwan (Caravan) at a lower salary. Dissatisfied with his work, he applied to Krishan Chander for a job with All India Radio in Delhi. Subsequently, he moved to Delhi in January 1941 and accepted the job of writing for the Urdu Service of All India Radio.

=== In Delhi (1941-1942) ===
Manto joined All India Radio in early 1941 and became acquainted with many writers working there, such as Chiragh Hasan Hasrat, Akhtar Hussain Raipuri, Ansar Nasiri, Mahmud Nizami, Meeraji and Upendranath Ashk.

This proved to be his most productive period, as in the next eighteen months he published over four collections of radio plays, Aao (Come), Manto ke Drame (Manto's Dramas), Janaze (Funerals) and Teen Auraten (Three women). He continued to write short stories, and his next short story collection, Dhuan (Smoke) was soon out, followed by his first collection of topical essays, Manto ke Mazamin. This period culminated with the publication of his mixed collection Afsane aur Dramey in 1943. Meanwhile, due to growing differences with his colleagues at All India Radio, he left his job and returned to Bombay in July 1942 and again started working with the film industry.

=== Return to Bombay (1942-1948) ===
Manto returned to Bombay in July 1942 and rejoined as the editor of Musawwir. During this time, he associated with his Aligarh friend Shaheed Latif and his wife Ismat Chughtai. In 1942, on Latif's invitation, he joined the Filmistan studio. Here he also formed friendship with Ashok Kumar and entered his best phase in screenwriting giving films like Aatth Din, Chal Chal Re Naujawan and Mirza Ghalib, which was finally released in 1954. He also wrote Shikari. Some of his short stories also came from this phase, including Kaali Shalwar (1941), Dhuan (1941), and Bu (1945), which was published in Qaumi Jang (Bombay) in February 1945. Another highlight of his second phase in Bombay was the publication of a collection of his stories, Chugad, which also included the story 'Babu Gopinath'. Dissatisfied with the people at Filmistan, he joined the Bombay Talkies in 1947, after the partition of India.

=== Migration to Pakistan ===
As a resident of Bombay, Manto had intended to stay in India after partition. In 1948, his wife and children went to Lahore to visit their relatives and friends. During this time, as stories of the atrocities of partition riots reached him, in the midst of occasional communal riots in Bombay itself, he decided to migrate to Pakistan, and left for it by ship. He stayed a few days in Karachi, finally settling at Lahore with his family. Manto and his family thus found themselves as "muhajirs" (refugees from India) and were among the millions of Muslims who left present-day India for the new Muslim-majority nation of Pakistan.

=== Life in Lahore ===
When Manto arrived in Lahore from Bombay, he associated with several intellectuals at Lahore's Pak Tea House. According to one commentator: "There was absolutely no external influence and people would share their opinions on any subject without fear even during the military dictators' regimes." In Lahore, Manto lived with his wife and family in an apartment in Lakshmi Building located in Lahore's famous Lakshmi Chowk (where many Film Distributors had offices) at the juncture of McLeod Road and Abbott Road. Lakshmi Building no longer exists as such, but only its front or facade has been renovated and still faces McLeod Road. Lakshmi Building was abandoned during the partition riots of 1947-48 in Lahore. The mansion is currently dilapidated and uninhabited, though its façade still exists, renovated and painted.

Later on, when Manto's financial situation went from bad to worse, he and his family moved in with his wife, Mrs. Safia Manto's extended family. This was Manto's extended family as well, including his relatives, Film Director Masud Pervaiz, and Cricket Commentator Hamid Jalal. Manto, Safia Manto and their three daughters all lived with their extended family in a large apartment in the posh LAKSHMI MANSION, an Apartment Complex situated between Hall Road and Beadon Road which had a circular enclosed green space with a Peepal Tree where the other Apartment residents included Mani Shankar Ayyar and the renowned Lahore jeweller Girdhari Lal. The three-story building was built by Lala Lajpat Rai's Lakshmi insurance company in 1938, inaugurated by Sarojini Naidu, and was at one time the residence of K.Santhanam, an eminent lawyer. Lakshmi Mansion still exists in Lahore and was never abandoned. Later residents have included a former Speaker of Pakistan's National Assembly and Pakistan Peoples Party stalwart Malik Meraj Khalid.

=== Death ===
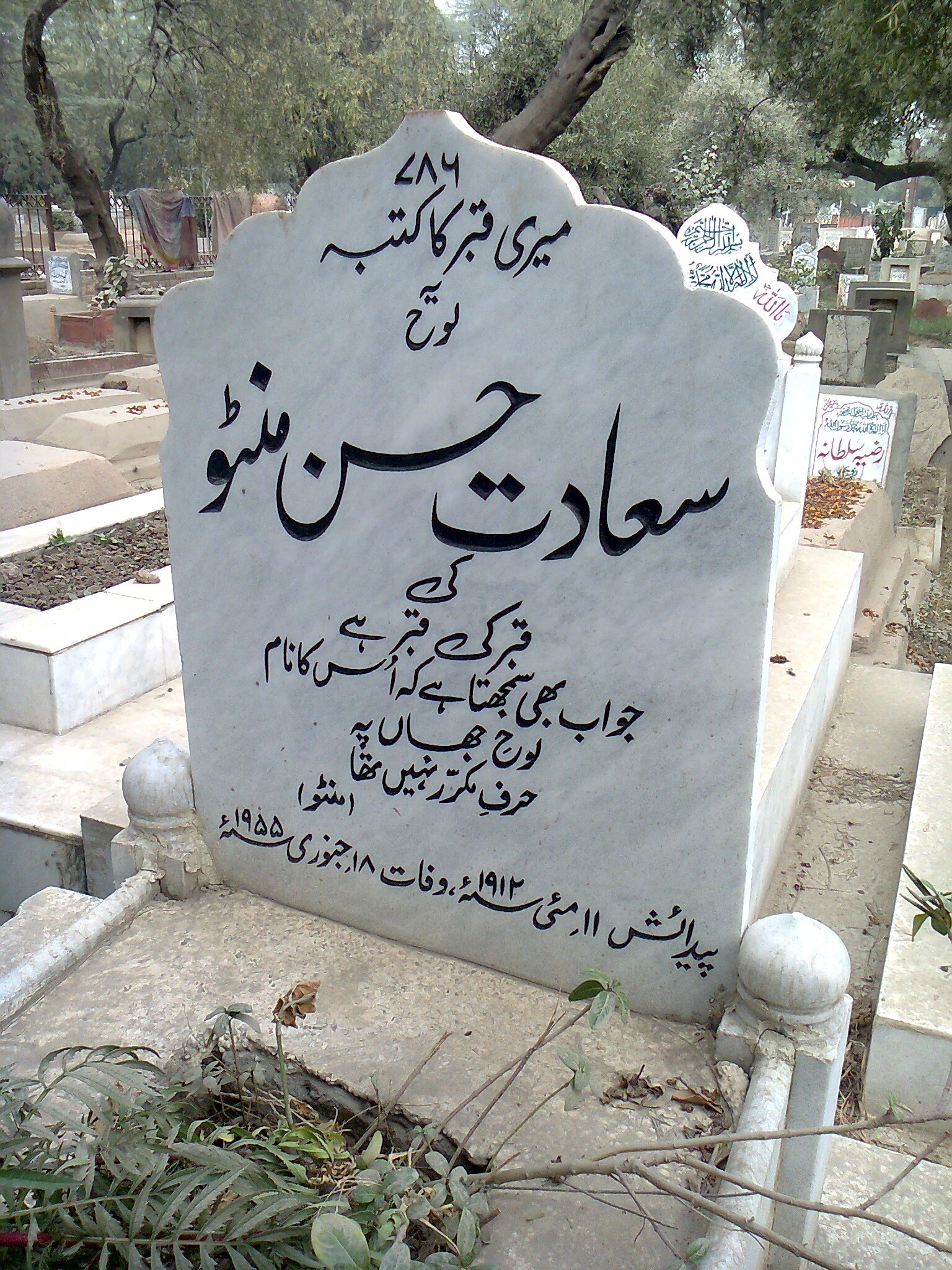
Manto's grave at Miani Saheb graveyard in Lahore.

Manto had suffered public trials mainly on the charge of writing obscene literature in the newly created and increasingly Islamized Pakistan. Sessions Judge Munir presided over Manto's last trial in Lahore, and he is the infamous judge who later became Justice Munir, Chief Justice of Pakistan Supreme Court, and who invented the Doctrine of Necessity alias Nazria-e-Zaroorat in later years to buttress martial law in Pakistan. In this trial in Lahore against Manto, Faiz Ahmad Faiz, M.D. Taseer and many literary celebrities testified in favour of Manto. Manto's trial ended with a warning from Sessions Judge Munir that he was being let off easy with just a fine, but would be sent to jail for many years if he did not stop writing his provocative short stories. So, Manto could not write his novel and cutting-edge short stories. Manto sank into depression. He tried to alleviate his depression with alcohol, and this started affecting his liver and led to cirrhosis of the liver, with him vomiting blood. His wife and relatives tried admitting him into Lahore Mental Asylum on Jail Road, Lahore, which was the rehab clinic for alcoholics at that time. This treatment did not work. Manto returned to Lakshami Mansions, Beadon Road, near Mall Road. Soon, he had become increasingly alcoholic, which eventually led to cirrhosis of the liver. He died on 18 January 1955, at Lakshami Mansions, Lahore. His death was attributed to the effects of alcoholism.

Manto is buried in the Miani Saheb graveyard in Lahore. In 1954, he composed his own epitaph:

Here lies Saadat Hasan Manto. With him lie buried all the arts and mysteries of short story writing . . . Under tons of earth he lies, wondering who of the two is the greater short story writer: God or he.

However, on the insistence of his family it was replaced by an alternative epitaph on his grave, which was also authored by him, inspired by a couplet from Ghalib:

This is the grave of the grave of Saadat Hasan Manto, who still thinks his name was not the repeated word on the tablet of time.

== Personal life ==
On 26 April 1939, Manto married Safia Begum. Their first child, Arif, died at a young age in April 1941 in Delhi. Later, they had three daughters: Nighat Manto, Nuzhat Manto, and Nusrat Manto. His daughter Nighat Bashir still lives at Lakshami Mansions, Beadon Road, where Manto died.

== Writings ==
Manto chronicled the chaos that prevailed during and after the Partition of India in 1947. Manto strongly opposed the partition of India, which he saw as an "overwhelming tragedy" and "maddeningly senseless". He started his literary career translating the works of Victor Hugo, Oscar Wilde and Russian writers such as Chekhov and Gorky. His first story was "Tamasha", based on the Jallianwala Bagh massacre at Amritsar. Though his earlier works, influenced by the progressive writers of his times, showed a marked leftist and socialist leanings, his later work progressively became stark in portraying the darkness of the human psyche, as humanist values progressively declined around the Partition.

"A writer picks up his pen only when his sensibility is hurt."
-- Manto to a court judge

His final works, which grew from the social climate and his own financial struggles, reflected an innate sense of human impotency towards darkness and contained satire that verged on dark comedy, as seen in his final work, Toba Tek Singh. It not only showed the influence of his own demons, but also that of the collective madness that he saw in the ensuing decade of his life. To add to it, his numerous court cases and societal rebukes deepened his cynical view of society, from which he felt isolated. No part of human existence remained untouched or taboo for him; he sincerely brought out stories of prostitutes and pimps alike, just as he highlighted the subversive sexual slavery of the women of his time. To many contemporary women writers, his language portrayed reality and provided them with the dignity they long deserved. He is still known for his scathing insight into human behaviour as well as revelation of the macabre animalistic nature of the enraged people, that stands out amidst the brevity of his prose.

"We’ve been hearing this for some time now — Save India from this, save it from that. The fact is that India needs to be saved from the people who say it should be saved.
-- Manto

At least one commentator compares Saadat Hasan Manto to D. H. Lawrence, partly because he wrote about taboos of Indo-Pakistani Society. His concerns on the socio-political issues, from local to global are revealed in his series, Letters to Uncle Sam, and those to Pandit Nehru. On his writing he often commented, "If you find my stories dirty, the society you are living in is dirty. With my stories, I only expose the truth".

== Controversies ==
=== Conservative critique: charge for obscenity ===
Manto faced trial for obscenity in his writings, three times in British India before 1947 (‘Dhuan’, ‘Bu’ and ‘Kali Shalwar’) and three times in Pakistan after 1947 (‘Khol Do’, ‘Thanda Gosht’ and ‘Upar Neeche Darmiyaan’) under section 292 of the Indian Penal Code (by the British Government) and the Pakistan Penal Code in Pakistan's early years. He was fined only in one case. Regarding the charges of obscenity, he opined, "I am not a pornographer but a story writer".

=== Progressive critique: migration to Pakistan ===
While the conservative or right-wing section of the society criticised him on moral grounds, the progressives or Marxists and leftists criticised him for ideological reasons, namely for his migration to Pakistan and embrace of Pakistani nationalism, Manto then being championed by traditional minded literary critics such as Hasan Askari and Mumtaz Shirin.

== Legacy ==
=== Awards ===
On 14 August 2012 which is Pakistan's Independence Day, Saadat Hasan Manto was posthumously awarded the Nishan-e-Imtiaz award (Distinguished Service to Pakistan Award) by the Government of Pakistan.

=== Film, theatre, and literature ===
Manto was a writer whose life story became a subject of intense discussion and introspection. During the last two decades, many stage productions were done to present his character in conflict with the harsh socio-economic realities of the post-partition era. Danish Iqbal's stage Play Ek Kutte Ki Kahani presented Manto in a new perspective on the occasion of his birth centenary.

In 2015, Pakistani actor and director Sarmad Khoosat made and released a movie, Manto, based on the life of Manto. In 2018, the British Broadcasting Corporation named the work Toba Tek Singh among the 100 stories that shaped the world, alongside works by authors like Homer and Virginia Woolf.

The 2018 film Manto, made by Nandita Das and starring Nawazuddin Siddiqui, is a Bollywood film based on the life of Manto.

=== Other Media ===
On 18 January 2005, the fiftieth anniversary of his death, Manto was commemorated on a Pakistani postage stamp.

On 11 May 2020, Google celebrated his 108th birthday with a Google Doodle.

== Bibliography ==
- Rusi Afsanay (Russian Stories) - translated collection of Russian short stories
- Atish Paray (Nuggets of Fire) – 1936 آتش پارے - short stories collection
- Manto Ke Afsanay (Stories of Manto) – 1940 منٹو کے افسانے - short stories collection
- Aao (Come) - 1940 - radio play collection
- Dhuan (Smoke) – 1941 دُھواں - short stories collection
- Janaze (Funerals) - 1942 - radio play collection
- Teen Auraten (Three women) - 1942 - radio play collection
- Afsane Aur Dramay (Fiction and Drama) – 1943 افسانے اور ڈرامے - collection of stories and radio plays
- Manto ke Drame (Manto's Dramas) - radio play collection
- Chugad (Blind Fool)– چُغد - short stories collection
- Khol Do (Open It) – 1948 کھول دو
- Lazzat-e-Sang – 1948 (The Taste of Rock) لذتِ سنگ
- Siyah Hashiye – 1948 (Black Borders) سیاہ حاشیہ
- Badshahat Ka Khatimah (The End of Kingship) – 1950 بادشاہت کا خاتمہ
- Khali Botlein (Empty Bottles) – 1950 خالی بوتلیں
- Loud Speaker (Sketches) لاؤڈ سپیکر
- Ganjey Farishtey (Sketches) گنجے فرشتے
- Manto ke Mazameen منٹو کے مضا مین
- Nimrud Ki Khudai (Nimrod The God) – 1950 نمرود کی خُدائی
- Thanda Gosht (Cold Meat) – 1950 ٹھنڈا گوشت
- Yazid – 1951 یزید
- Pardey Ke Peechhey (Behind The Curtains) – 1953 پردے کے پیچھے
- Sarak Ke Kinarey (By the Roadside) – 1953 سڑک کے کنارے
- Baghair Unwan Ke (Without a Title) – 1954 بغیر عنوان کے
- Baghair Ijazit (Without Permission) – 1955 بغیر اجازت
- Toba Tek Singh – 1955 ٹوبہ ٹیک سنگھ
- Burquey – 1955 بُرقعے
- Phunduney (Tassles) – 1955 پھندنے
- Sarkandon Ke Peechhey (Behind The Reeds) – 1955 سرکنڈوں کے پیچھے
- Shaiytan (Satan) – 1955 شیطان
- Shikari Auratein (Hunter Women) – 1955 شکاری عورتیں
- Ratti, Masha, Tolah – 1956 رتی ماشہ تولہ
- Kaali Shalwar (Black Pants) – 1961 کالی شلوار
- Manto Ki Behtareen Kahanian (Best Stories of Manto) – 1963 منٹو کی بہترین کہانیاں
- Tahira Se Tahir (From Tahira to Tahir) – 1971 طاہرہ سے طاہر
- Mottled Dawn: Fifty Sketches and Stories of Partition - 1997
