= Rekhta (website) =

Literary web portal for Urdu Literature

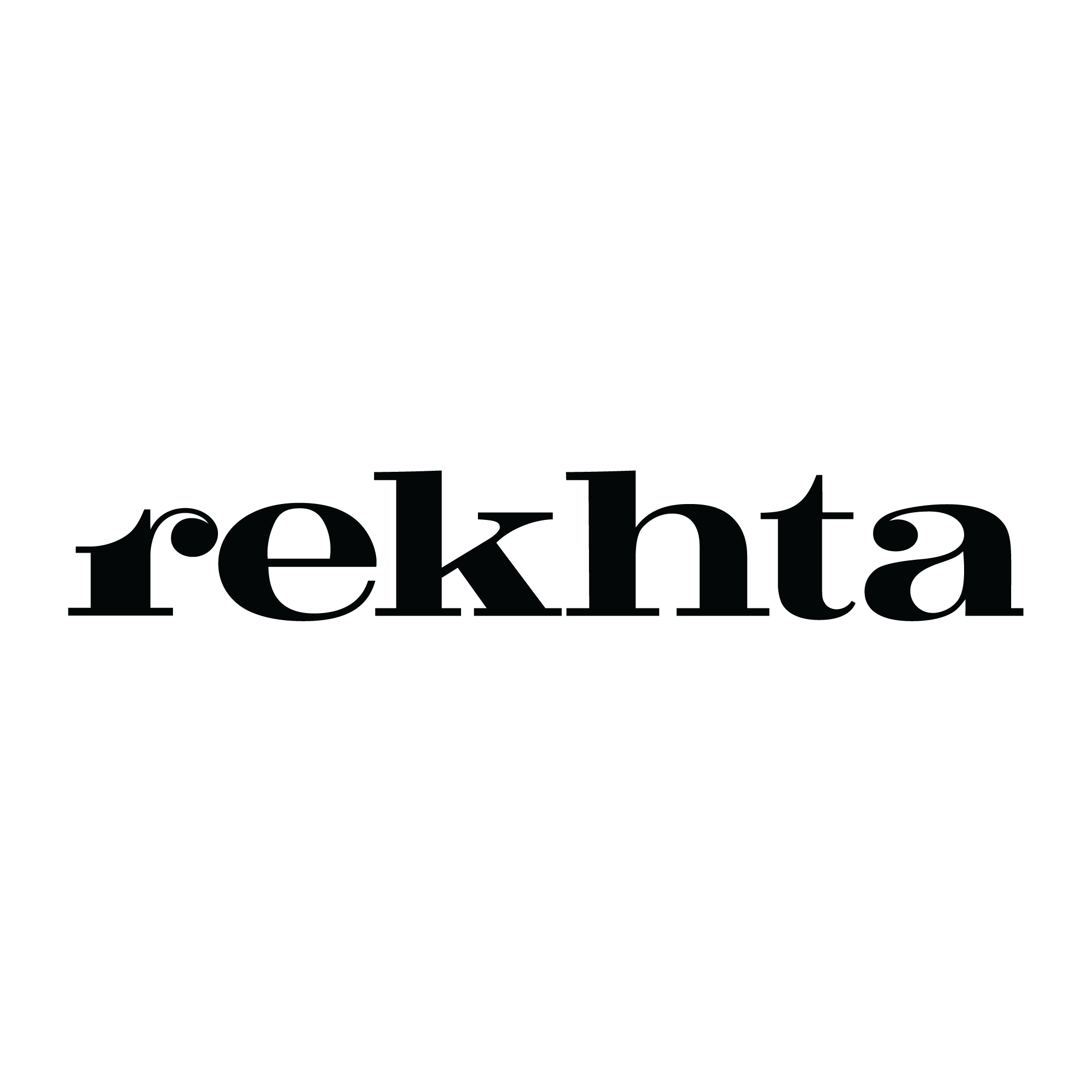
- Website type: Literature
- Available in: English, Urdu, Hindi
- Headquarters: Noida, India
- Owner: Rekhta Foundation
- Founder: Sanjiv Saraf
- Website: rekhta.org
- Commercial: No
- Registration: Optional
- Launched: 11 January 2013; 13 years ago
- Current status: Online
- Content license: Creative Commons license

Rekhta is an Indian web portal started by Rekhta Foundation, a non-profit organisation dedicated to the preservation and promotion of Urdu literature. The Rekhta Library Project, its books preservation initiative, has successfully digitized approximately 200,000 books over a span of ten years. These books primarily consist of Urdu, Hindi and Persian literature and encompass a wide range of genres, including biographies of poets, Urdu poetry, fiction, and nonfiction. The collection originates from public and research libraries in the Indian subcontinent. It serves content in multiple scripts such as Devanagari, Roman and, primarily, the Urdu script. It hosts books from centuries earlier and is recognized as the largest website in the world for the preservation of Urdu literature.

The site has digitized more than 200,000 e-books with 32 million pages, which are categorically classified into different sections such as diaries, children's literature, poetry, banned books, and translations, involving Urdu poetry. It is also credited for preserving 7,000 biographies of poets (worldwide), 70,000 ghazals, 28,000 couplets, 12,000 nazms, 6,836 literary videos, 2,127 audio files, 140,000 e-books manuscripts and pop magazines.

== History ==
Rekhta was launched on 11 January 2013 in New Delhi, India. The portal came into existence after the idea of "Urdu virtual library" was introduced by Sanjiv Saraf to professors of Urdu from across leading universities. Literary works, including Urdu poetry, were collected from private and public libraries across the major cities of India, such as Lucknow, Bhopal, Hyderabad, Aligarh, including the capital, Delhi.

== Literature promotion ==
=== Rekhta Live ===
Following the COVID-19 pandemic lockdowns, it launched an "online mehfil" (live seasons) of literature, music and poetry across its social channels via third-party software component. It was attended by people across the five continents, leading the website to receive over two million views.

=== Festivals ===
The Foundation celebrates various literary festivals, including Jashn-e-Rekhta, in which people from different walks are invited to participate in literary works such as Urdu poetry, music, short stories. It also engages literary figures in conversations to promote Hindustani language along with the Urdu literature. The two day event is organized every year at Delhi.

=== Shaam-e-Sher ===
The Foundation organises mushairas, a literary event called Shaam-e-Sher (evening of poetry). It is generally attended by the young adult poets aged between eighteen and thirty. It was primarily adopted to promote Urdu literature where ghazals and nazms are recited by the event attendees.

=== Aamozish ===
Launched by the Foundation in 2017, Aamozish is an e-learning initiative that seeks to promote the Urdu script.

=== Sufinama ===
Sufinama is a Rekhta Foundation initiative that preserves and propagates 400 years of Sufi writing and philosophy. It also provides the largest online collection of Hazrat Amir Khusrau's work and the translations of his Persian ghazals.

=== Hindwi ===
The Foundation also launched Hindwi, a website dedicated to Hindi literature, in July 2020.

=== RekhtaLabs ===
RekhtaLabs is the research wing of Rekhta, aimed at advancing NLP research for Urdu.

=== Anjas ===
The Foundation also launched Anjas, a Rajasthani website dedicated to Rajasthani language, art, literature and culture in October 2022.

=== Rekhta Gujarati ===
The Foundation launched Rekhta Gujarati, a literature initiative in Gujarati language in March 2024.

== Controversies ==
The organization made changes in the Jashn-e-Rekhta event by replacing Urdu with the Hindustani language, although the organisation was established for the promotion of Urdu literature through its portal. On 13 December 2019, it made official announcement during its sixth edition of the mehfil held at Major Dhyan Chand National Stadium. The posters, which were received by the event speakers, mentioned "Jashn-e-Rekhta: The Biggest Celebration of Hindustani Language and Culture" (not mentioning "Urdu" word). Later, the Urdu speakers criticised the changes, citing "It seems Jashn-e-Rekhta has surrendered to the powers that be". An Indian writer and journalist Ziya Us Salam called the changes unfavorable and linked it to the Delhi High Court's decision after it ordered the police "to cut down on “difficult” words in Urdu". An Indian poet Gauhar Raza subsequently called the changes "unfortunate" and "problematic".

== E-books ==
Rekhta has digitized a vast collection of over 100,000 e-books, covering Urdu, Hindi, and Persian literature. These e-books span a wide range of genres, including poetry, fiction, biographies, and nonfiction. The collection is available in multiple scripts such as Nastaliq, Devanagari, and Roman, making it accessible to a diverse audience. It includes rare and historical manuscripts, children's literature, banned books, and translations. In addition, Rekhta provides literary videos and audio files related to these works, offering an interactive and multimedia reading experience.

=== e-book ===
- Shikwa Jawab-e-Shikwa – Allama Iqbal
- Diwan-e-Ghalib – Mirza Ghalib
- Aab-e-Hayat – Muhammad Husain Azad
- Umrao Jaan Ada – Mirza Hadi Ruswa
- Kulliyat-e-Faiz – Faiz Ahmed Faiz
- Shikwa Jawab Shikwa “Sawal-e-Fasiq Jawab-e-Khalaq” – Anjum Lucknowi
- Lamhe Lamhe – Rahat Indori
