= Aigle Azur =

Airline in France (1970–2019)

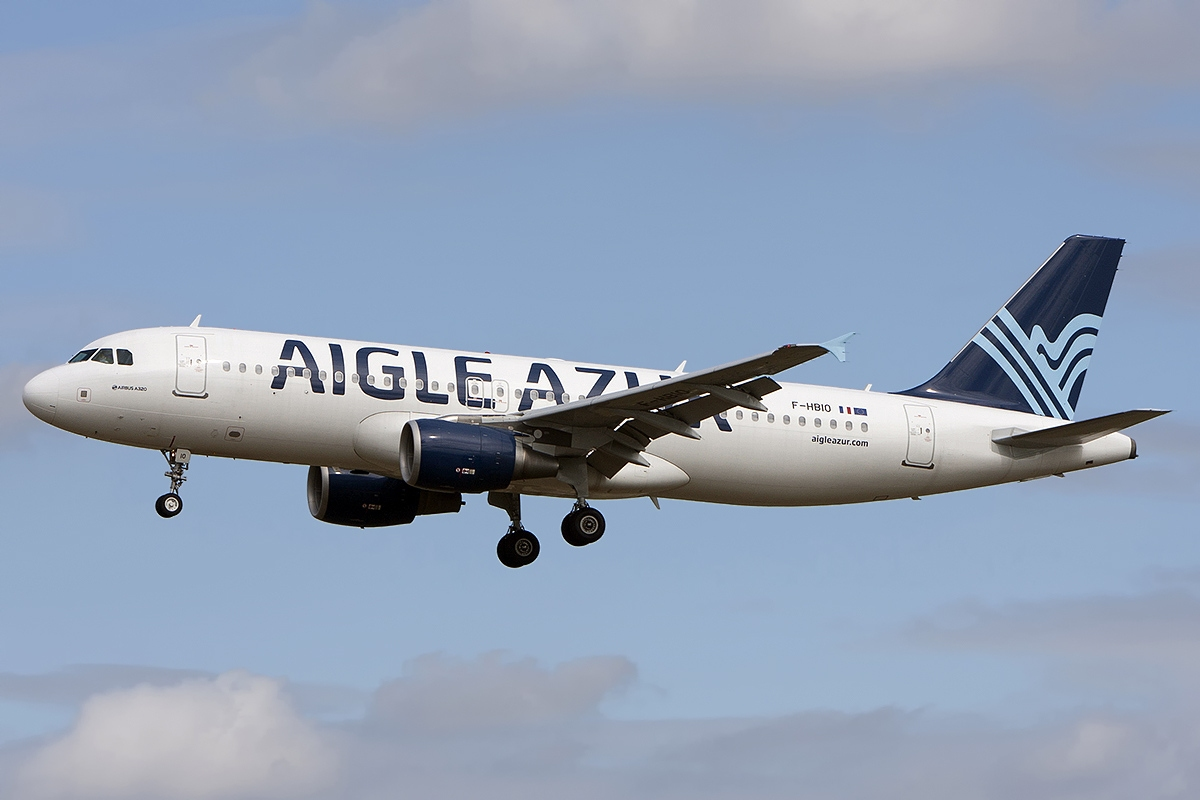
- Aigle Azur Airbus A320
IATA	ICAO	Call sign
ZI	AAF	AIGLE AZUR
- Founded: April 1946
- Ceased operations: 6 September 2019
- Hubs: Orly Airport
- Frequent-flyer program: Azur Plus
- Fleet size: 11
- Destinations: 21
- Parent company: GoFast Group
- Headquarters: Paray-Vieille-Poste, France
- Key people: Frantz Yvelin (CEO)
- Website: aigle-azur.com

Aigle Azur was a French airline based and headquartered at Paris Orly Airport. The airline operated scheduled flights from France to 21 destinations across Europe, Africa, and the Middle East, with a fleet of Airbus A320 family and A330 aircraft. The airline filed for bankruptcy and was placed in receivership on 2 September 2019. Takeover bids were received, but none proved viable and the airline was liquidated by the court on 27 September 2019.

== History ==
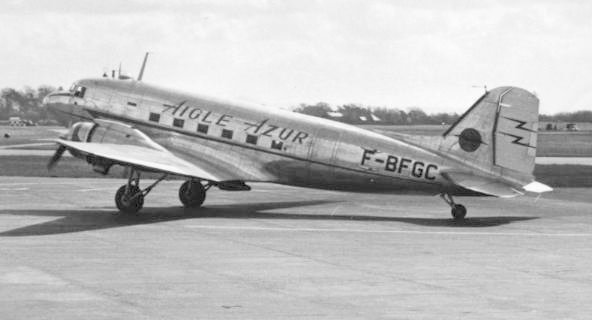
Douglas DC-3 from Aigle Azur in 1953, equipped with a Turbomeca Palas ventral booster engine

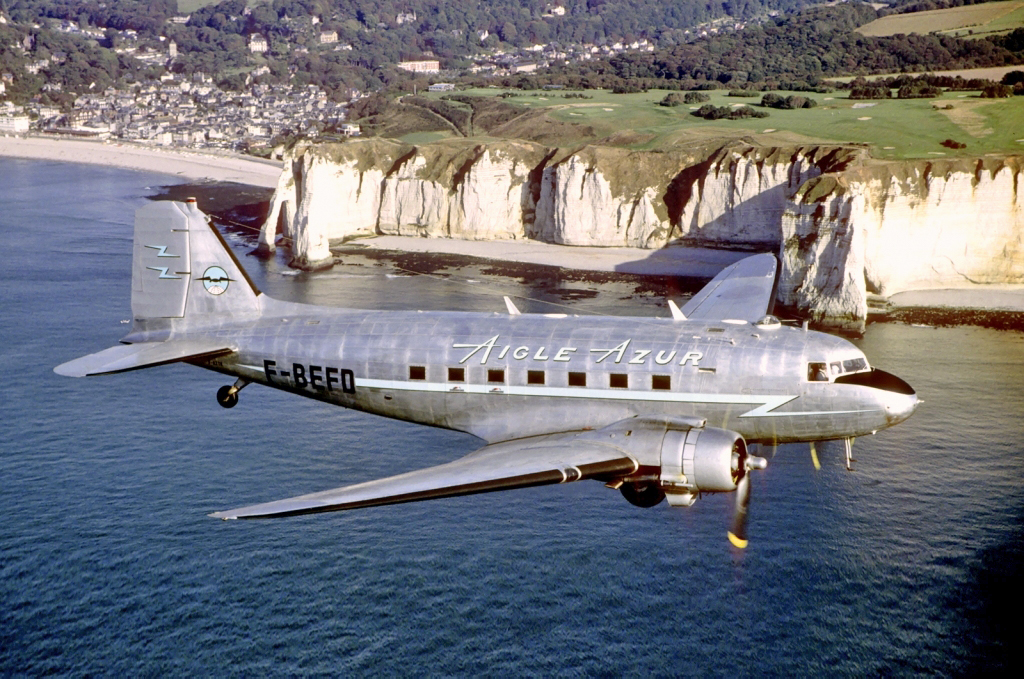
DC-3 in Aigle Azur's 1950s colours at the company's 60th anniversary

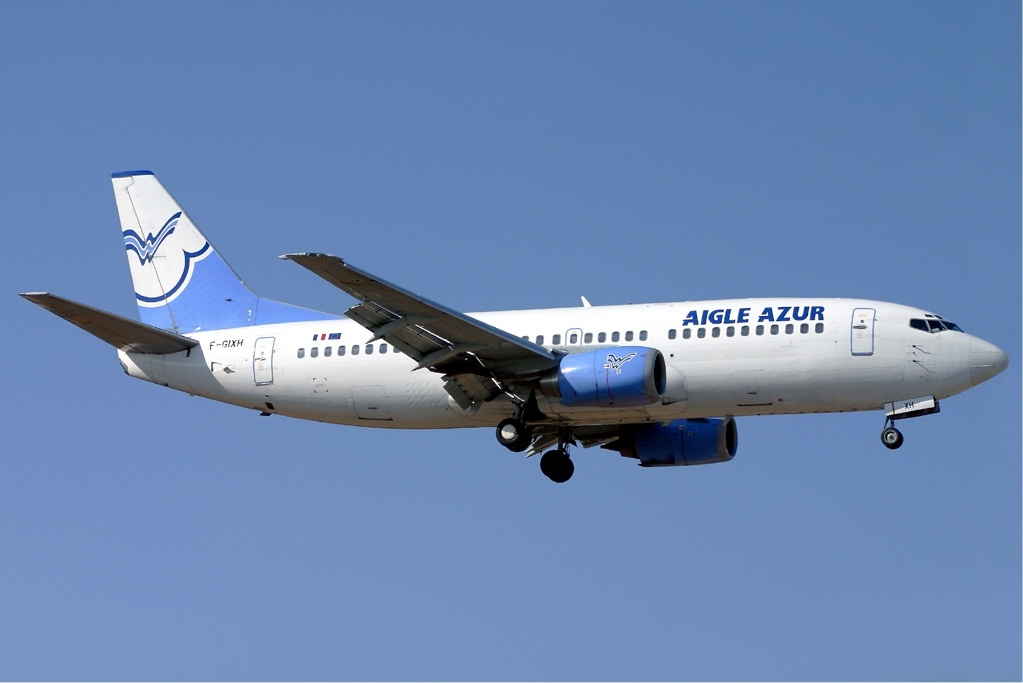
A former Aigle Azur Boeing 737-300

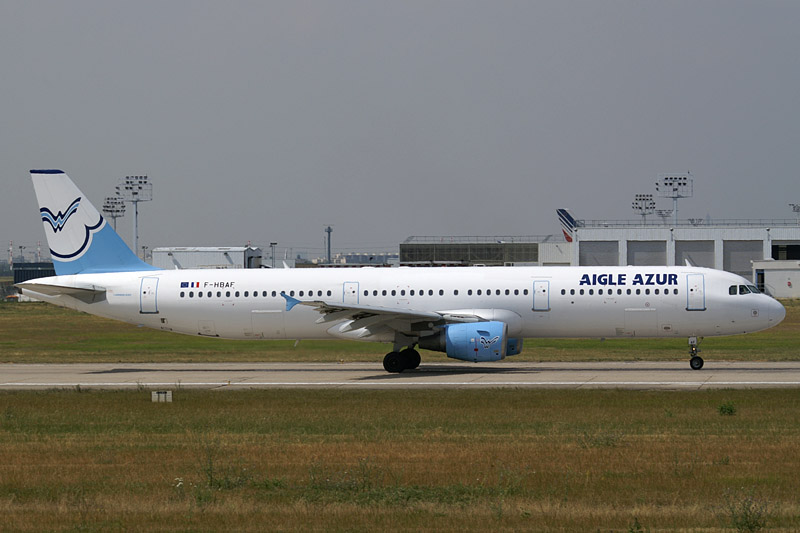
A former Aigle Azur Airbus A321-200

=== 1946–1955 ===
Aigle Azur was founded in 1946 by Sylvain Floirat, becoming the first post-war private company and began operating a few Junkers Ju 52s with an increased capacity of 32 passengers. Its founder also managed to secure special transport contracts with the authorities, such as contracts for overseas teachers during the school holidays, with its first destinations to Tunisia and Lebanon. Purchasing more modern equipment from American surplus allowed the company to extend its activities into Indochina and Algeria, where an important market was the repatriation of people back to France.

On 1 May 1955, Sylvain Floirat transferred the entire fleet to the Union Aéromaritime de Transport (UAT), along with 54 of the company's crew members and its hotel staff.

=== 1970–2000 ===
In 1970, the company was re-established as a regional airline under the name Lucas Aviation. Its registered office was at Pontoise airport. Lucas Aviation initially operated regional scheduled flights traded as Lucas Air Transport, including a year-round connecting service between Deauville and London Gatwick. The company name was later changed once again to Lucas Aigle Azur.

In addition to this regular route, Aigle Azur provided business flights for politicians, businessmen, sporting figures and artists.

=== Since 2001 ===
In 2001, Aigle Azur was in decline, with only two Boeing 737-200 aircraft. It was taken over by the GoFast group (a firm with specialties in freight, logistics, industrial projects and tourism), which invested capital into the company and updated its fleet, while primarily focusing on charter flights to Algeria. When Air Lib ceased trading, Aigle Azur opened regular routes to Algeria. It also benefited from the closing of Khalifa Airways, which had served Algeria from France along with Air Algérie.

In 2006, with open sky agreements in place in Morocco and Tunisia, the company was operating numerous regular flights to Morocco's main cities, notably Casablanca, Rabat, Marrakesh, Agadir, Fes, Tangier and Oujda.

In 2007, Aigle Azur was offering 30 regular destinations from several French cities, and launched regular flights from Paris Orly to Djerba, Paris Orly to Rimini and Marseille to Sal, Cape Verde. It also rolled out electronic tickets.

At the beginning of 2008, the company was able to add new destinations, with regular flights to Faro, in the south of Portugal and Bamako in Mali. At the end of April 2008, it received its third Airbus A319, registered as F-HBMI, increasing the size of its fleet to 11 aircraft. In June 2008, its loyalty programme, Azur Plus, was launched.

In May 2009, the company received its first new Airbus A320^{2}, and its presence at the Paris Air Show enabled it to order a fourth Airbus A319 from Airbus a month later. This aircraft was delivered in April 2010. A fifth Airbus A319 was received in May 2010.

In June 2010, the company announced its plan to open a route between Paris and Baghdad, starting from September 2010. In July 2010, Aigle Azur began a partnership with the Malian company Air Mali. This meant that Aigle Azur was able to begin selling flights to other African cities, particularly to Dakar, Abidjan and Brazzaville. The agreement came into effect as from 1 August 2010. On 30 October 2010, the company's inaugural flight to Baghdad took place. The airline opened reservations for Baghdad, with the first commercial flights beginning in mid-December 2010. This route was discontinued in mid-2011 due to a lack of reservations resulting from events in the country.

On 23 November 2011, Aigle Azur opened a new regular route to Mali.

In July 2012, Aigle Azur opened a route between Paris Orly and Moscow Vnukovo. To accelerate its growth strategy and expand its network into the long-haul sector, on 23 October 2012 Aigle Azur announced that the Chinese conglomerate HNA Group had bought shares, leaving HNA Group (notably the owner of Hainan Airlines, Hong Kong Airlines, China West Airlines, Lucky Air, Tianjin Airlines, and Hong Kong Express) as the owner of 48% of Aigle Azur's capital. Thus the company was owned by Weaving Group, Lu Azur and the HNA Group. On 18 December 2012, Aigle Azur and Corsair International signed a commercial partnership agreement to harmonise their respective networks in order to enhance their passenger connections at Paris Orly. Aigle Azur and Corsair were then both able to make the most of their geographic deployments by cross-selling tickets each to their own customers, and in doing so generating additional revenues^{5}.

By 2014, Aigle Azur was the second-largest French airline after Air France, and ahead of Air Austral and Corsair International, and employed 1,400 people^{6}. The company was mainly competing with Air France, Air Algérie, EasyJet and TAP Air Portugal. In 2015, it opened connecting flights between Marseille and Dakar, then Lyon and Dakar, followed by a route to Conakry in 2016.

In 2017, Weaving Group sold the remaining 32% of its shares to David Neeleman (who was known to be involved with Azul Brazilian Airlines and TAP Air Portugal, and previously had ties to JetBlue)^{7}, thereby withdrawing from the company. At the request and with the support of the three Aigle Azur shareholders HNA Group, David Neeleman, and Lu Azur, Frantz Yvelin was named CEO of Aigle Azur^{8}, becoming the third entrepreneur to lead the company. Frantz Yvelin previously founded L'Avion in 2006 (now Openskies) and La Compagnie in 2013. 2017 also saw the launch of routes to Beirut, Berlin Tegel, and Moscow Domodedovo, and two Airbus A330 aircraft were ordered for the launch of long-haul flights.

On 29 March 2018, Frantz Yvelin held a press conference in Paris to present the company's new strategic directions. After major development of the network in 2017, the company announced new long-haul routes to São Paulo and Beijing to open in July and September 2018, respectively, with year-round service. Aigle Azur received two Airbus A330-200 aircraft formerly operated by Air Berlin in April 2018 to operate these two routes. Both were equipped with new cabins and a new visual identity^{9}. Aigle Azur also launched its first domestic route in 2018, between Lyon and Nantes, as well as a service to Italy (Milan). The company also developed new partnerships, including with Air Caraïbes, S7 Airlines, and TAP Air Portugal, in addition to the existing ones with Azul and Hainan Airlines.

On 22 January 2019, Aigle Azur announced it would launch a regular route to Kyiv by 18 April 2019.

French businessman Gerard Houa – who controls around 20% of the carrier – tried to take control but was rejected by HNA Group and David Neeleman. After that, the carrier was placed under the control of a temporary administrator on 27 August 2019 at the request of its president.

=== Bankruptcy and liquidation ===
Aigle Azur filed for bankruptcy and was placed in receivership on 2 September 2019, while it continued to operate flights. Flights to Mali, Brazil and Portugal were suspended as of 5 September, and ticket sales ceased for all flights after 10 September. Later on 5 September, the receiver decided to suspend all flights as of the evening of 6 September, citing the company's financial situation and operational difficulties.

A deadline of 9 September was set for takeover offers. Aigle Azur's 9,800 slots at Orly are reportedly of particular interest; the slots cannot be purchased directly, however, only via a takeover of the company. In total, 14 takeover offers were received. Confirmed bids to take over a significant proportion of assets were received from Air France, Groupe Dubreuil (owners of Air Caraïbes and French Bee) and Lu Azur (owned by former shareholder Gerard Houa). Expressions of interest primarily for activities at Orly were received from EasyJet, Vueling and other unnamed bidders.

A commercial court hearing on 16 September gave bidders until 18 September to submit revised proposals. A joint bid from Air France and Groupe Dubreuil was deemed by trade unions to offer the best conditions for personnel, though legal problems relating to the conditions on which personnel would be transferred to the new owner remained to be resolved. The receivership period was extended until 27 September to allow negotiations to continue. None of the bids proved viable, and the airline was formally liquidated by the commercial court on 27 September 2019.

== Destinations ==
=== Codeshare agreements ===
Aigle Azur had codeshare agreements with the following airlines:

- Air Caraïbes
- Azul Brazilian Airlines
- Corsair International
- Hainan Airlines
- S7 Airlines
- TAP Air Portugal

== Fleet ==
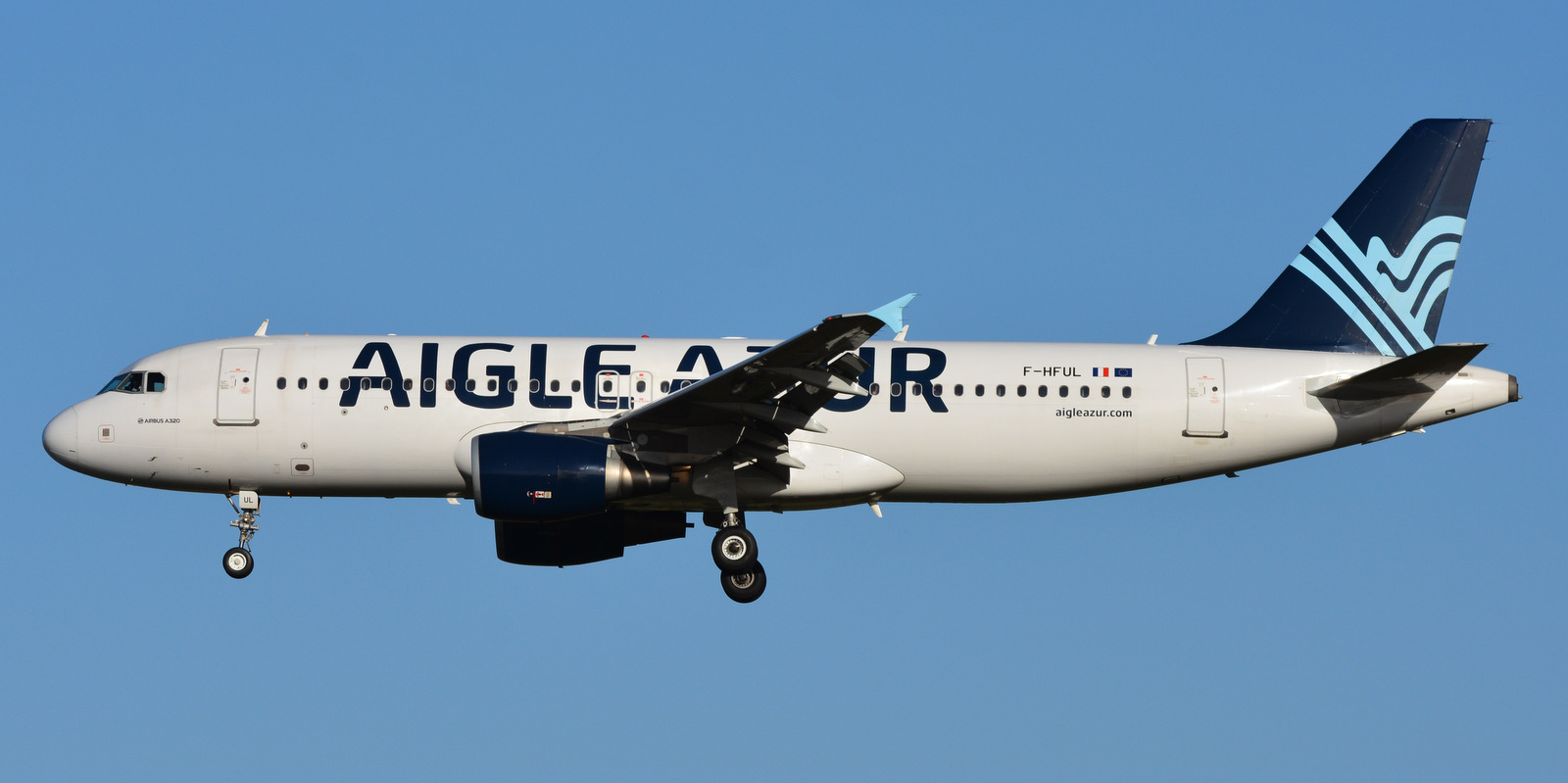
Aigle Azur Airbus A320-200

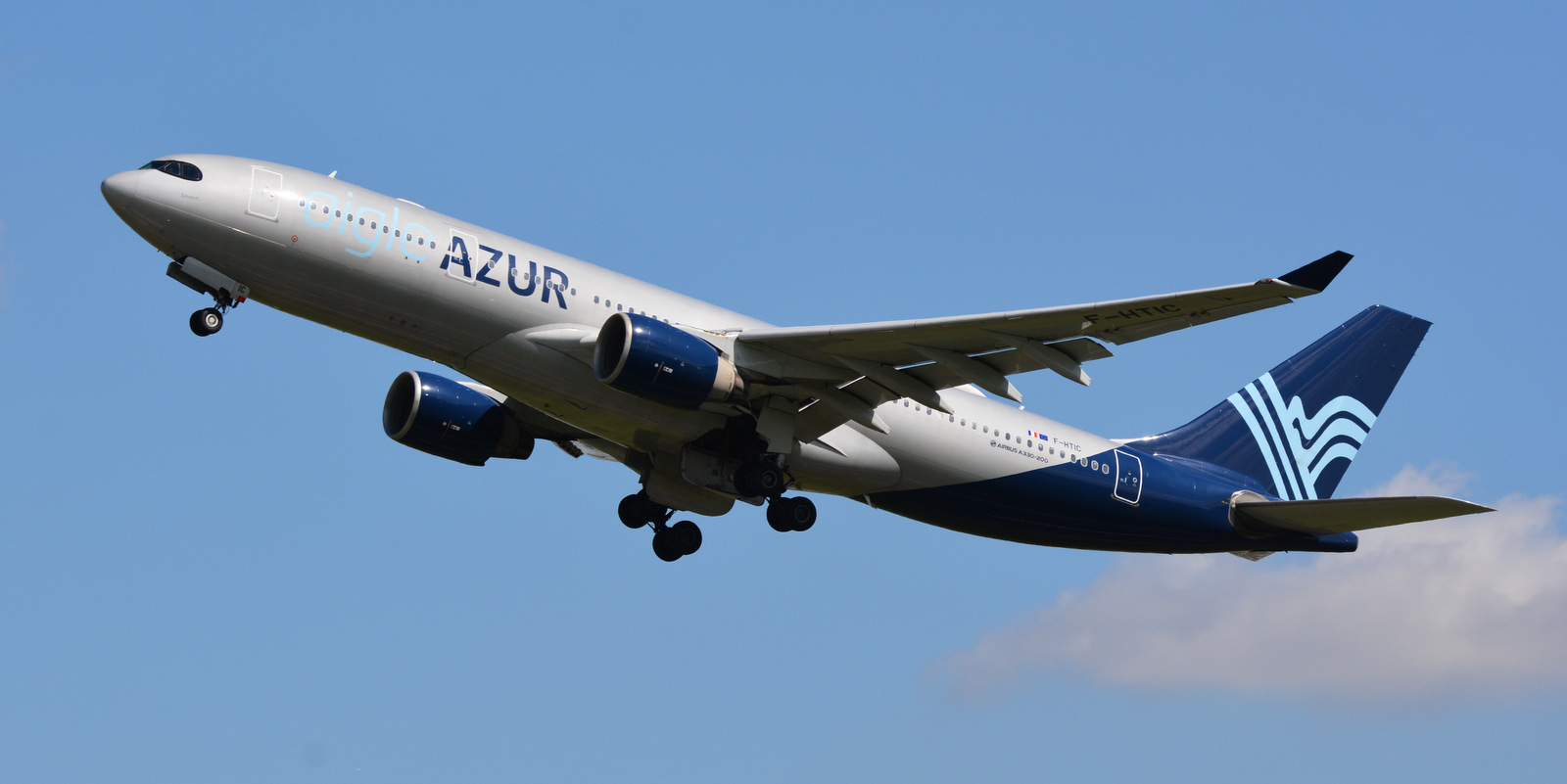
Aigle Azur Airbus A330-200

At the time of closure, the Aigle Azur fleet consisted of the following aircraft:

Aigle Azur fleet
Aircraft	In service	Orders	Notes
Airbus A319-100	1	—	
Airbus A320-200	8	—	
Airbus A330-200	2	—	
Total	11	—	

== See also ==
- List of defunct airlines of France
