= Mistral =

Mistral may refer to:

- Mistral (wind) in southern France and Sardinia

== Automobiles ==
- Maserati Mistral, a Maserati grand tourer produced from 1963 until 1970
- Nissan Mistral, or Terrano II, a Nissan 4×4 produced from 1993 until 2006
- Microplas Mistral, a kit car from the 1950s produced in England, United States, and New Zealand
- Bugatti Mistral, a mid-engine two-seater sports car produced from 2025 to 2025

== Companies ==
- Mistral AI, a French artificial intelligence company
- Mistral Appliances, an Australian home appliances brand
- Mistral Group, an American defense and law enforcement product marketing company

== Aviation ==
- Mistral Air (now Poste Air Cargo), an Italian cargo airline
- Mistral Aviation, an airline from the Republic of the Congo
- Mistral Engine Company, a Swiss light aircraft and helicopter engine manufacturer
- Aviasud Mistral, a French ultralight aircraft
- Sud-Est SE 535 Mistral, the French version of the de Havilland Vampire jet fighter
- Swing Mistral, a German paraglider design built by Swing Flugsportgeräte
- OpenSkies, an airline with the callsign MISTRAL

== People and characters ==
- Mistral Raymond (born 1987), American football player
- Frédéric Mistral (1830–1914), French writer and lexicographer
- Gabriela Mistral (1889–1957), pseudonym of the Chilean poet Lucila Godoy Alcayaga
- Jacques Mistral (born 1947), French economist and professor
- Jorge Mistral (1920–1972), Spanish actor
- Mistral, title character of the Laurell Hamilton novel Mistral's Kiss
- Mistral, a character from the video game Metal Gear Rising: Revengeance

== Ships and watercraft ==
- French ship Mistral, various ships of the French Navy, including:
- Mistral-class landing helicopter dock, a French-designed ship class of landing helicopter docks
- Mistral (S-73), a decommissioned Agosta-class submarine of the Spanish Navy
- Mistral One Design Class, a former windsurf class
- Grand Mistral (previously Mistral), an Iberocruceros cruise ship

== Other uses ==
- Mistral (album), a 1980 album by Freddie Hubbard
- Mistral (crater), a crater on Mercury
- Mistral (missile), a surface-to-air missile developed in France
- Mistral (pisco), a brand of pisco named after Gabriela Mistral
- Mistral (software), an information retrieval software system
- Mistral (typeface), a 1953 casual typeface designed by Frenchman Roger Excoffon
- Le Mistral (train), an express train which ran between Paris and Nice
- Operation Mistral 2, a Croatian military offensive in 1995
- Mistral, a brand name of the fungicide fenpropimorph
- Le Mistral, fictional setting of the French soap opera Plus belle la vie

== See also ==
- Mestral (disambiguation)
- Mistrial (disambiguation)
