= Wissous =

Commune in Île-de-France, France

- Commune
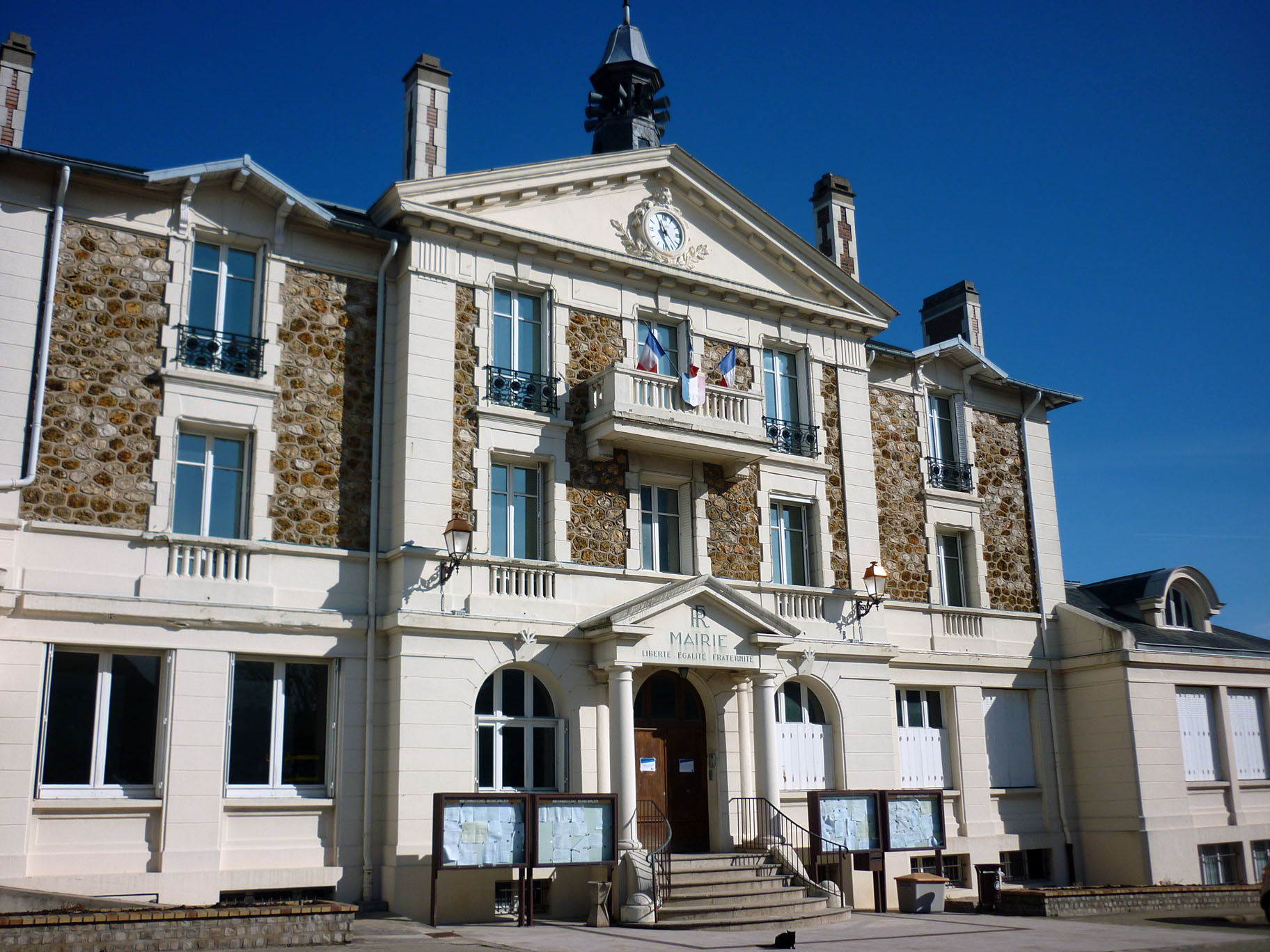
- The town hall in Wissous

- Coat of arms
- Location of Wissous
- Location within France Location within Île-de-France (region)
- Coordinates: 48°43′55″N 2°19′38″E
- Country: France
- Region: Île-de-France
- Department: Essonne
- Arrondissement: Palaiseau
- Canton: Savigny-sur-Orge
- Intercommunality: Paris-Saclay

Government
  - Mayor (2021–2026): Florian Gallant
- Area^{1}: 9.11 km^{2} (3.52 sq mi)
- Highest elevation: 99 m (325 ft)
- Lowest elevation: 48 m (157 ft)
- Population (2023): 7,151
  - Density: 785/km^{2} (2,030/sq mi)
- Time zone: UTC+01:00 (CET)
  - Summer (DST): UTC+02:00 (CEST)
- INSEE/Postal code: 91689 /91320
- ^{1} French Land Register data, which excludes lakes, ponds, glaciers > 1 km^{2} (0.386 sq mi or 247 acres) and river estuaries.

Wissous (French pronunciation: [visu]) is a commune in the Essonne department in Île-de-France in northern France. Paris-Orly Airport is partially located in the commune.

== Population ==
Inhabitants of Wissous are known as Wissoussiens in French.

Historical population
Year	Pop.	±% p.a.
1968	3,955	—
1975	4,402	+1.54%
1982	4,394	−0.03%
1990	4,888	+1.34%
1999	5,160	+0.60%
2007	5,112	−0.12%
2012	6,624	+5.32%
2017	7,470	+2.43%
2023	7,151	−0.72%
Source: INSEE

== History ==
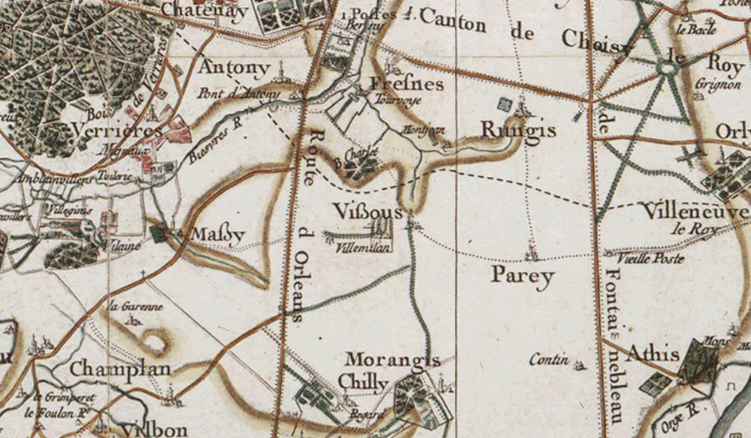
Wissous (Vißous) in a 17th-century map by Cassini

Wissous appears in an 11th-century French manuscript as a town called "Vizoor." The first mayor of Wissous was elected in 1790. Wissous experienced significant development since the beginning of the 20th century, with its population increasing by eightfold from 1900 to 2011.

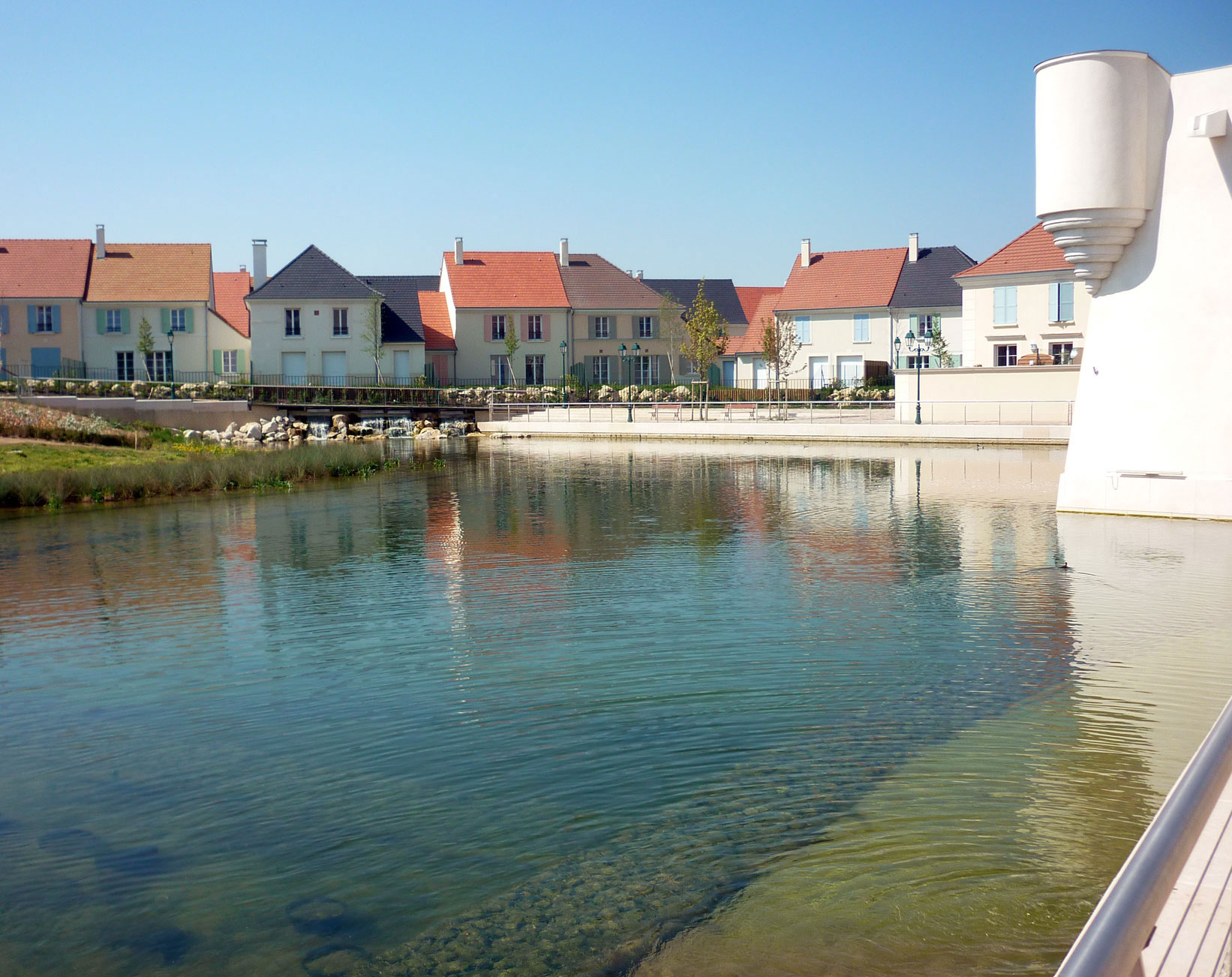
Saint-Eloi district

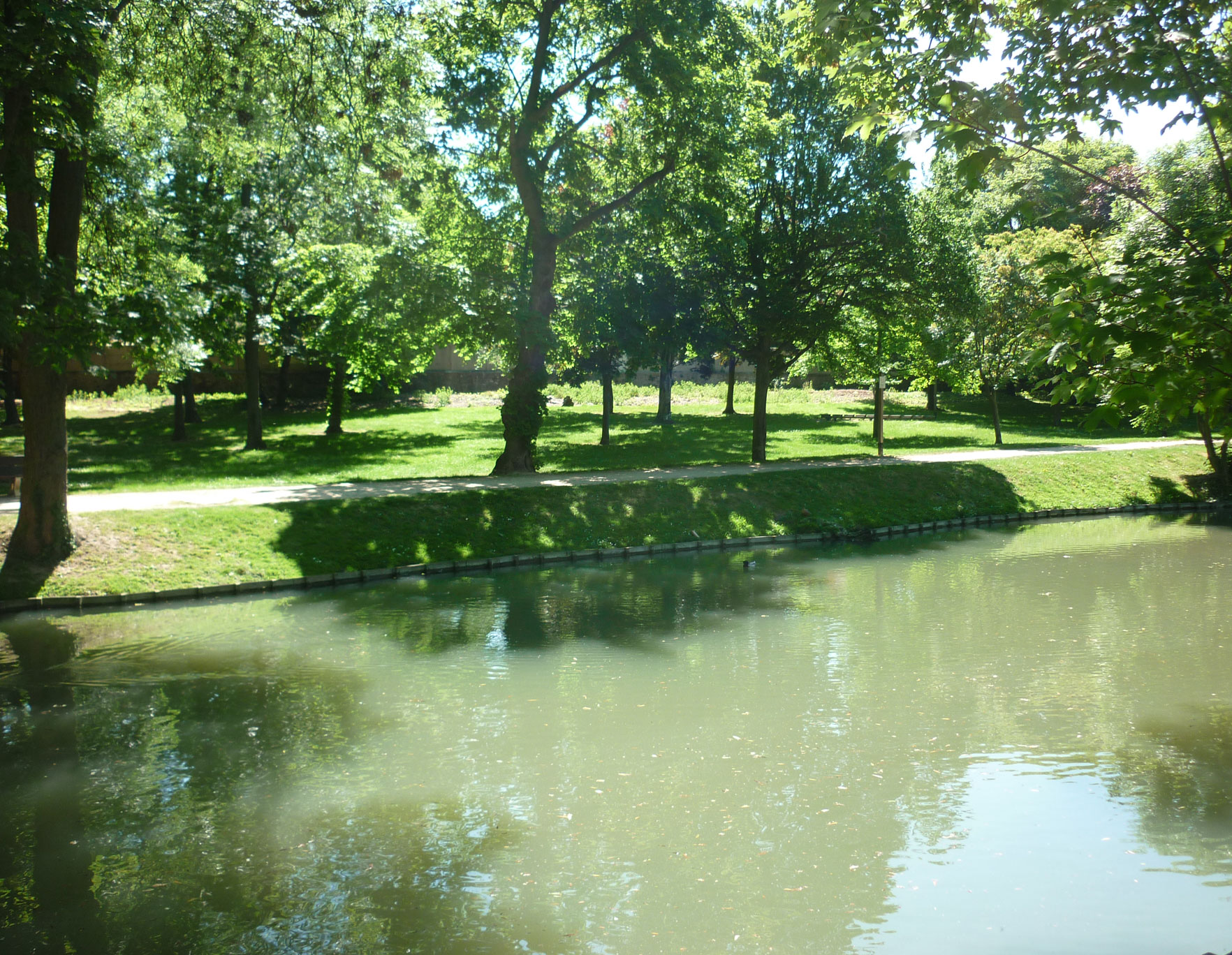
Arthur Clark park

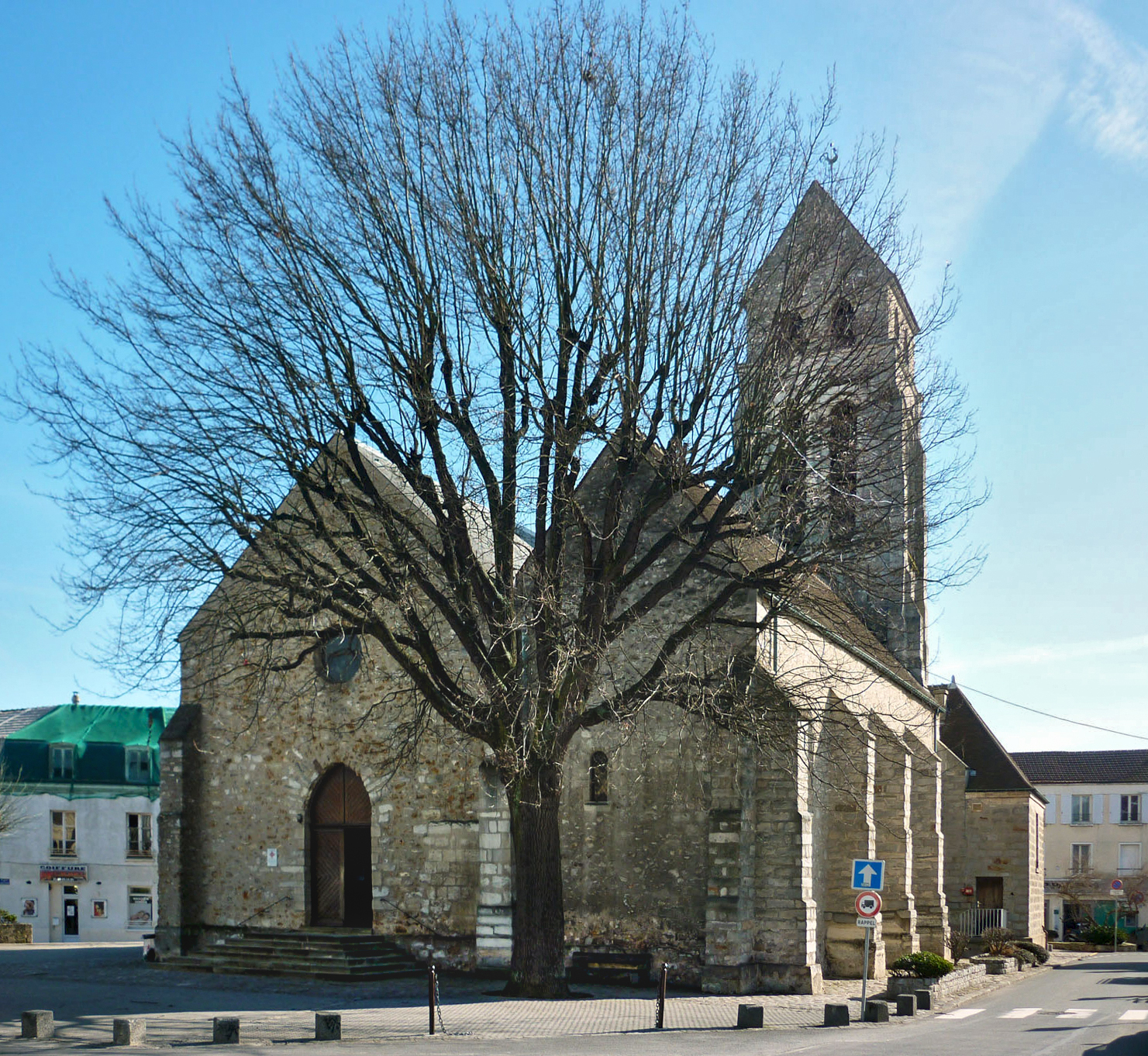
Saint Denis church

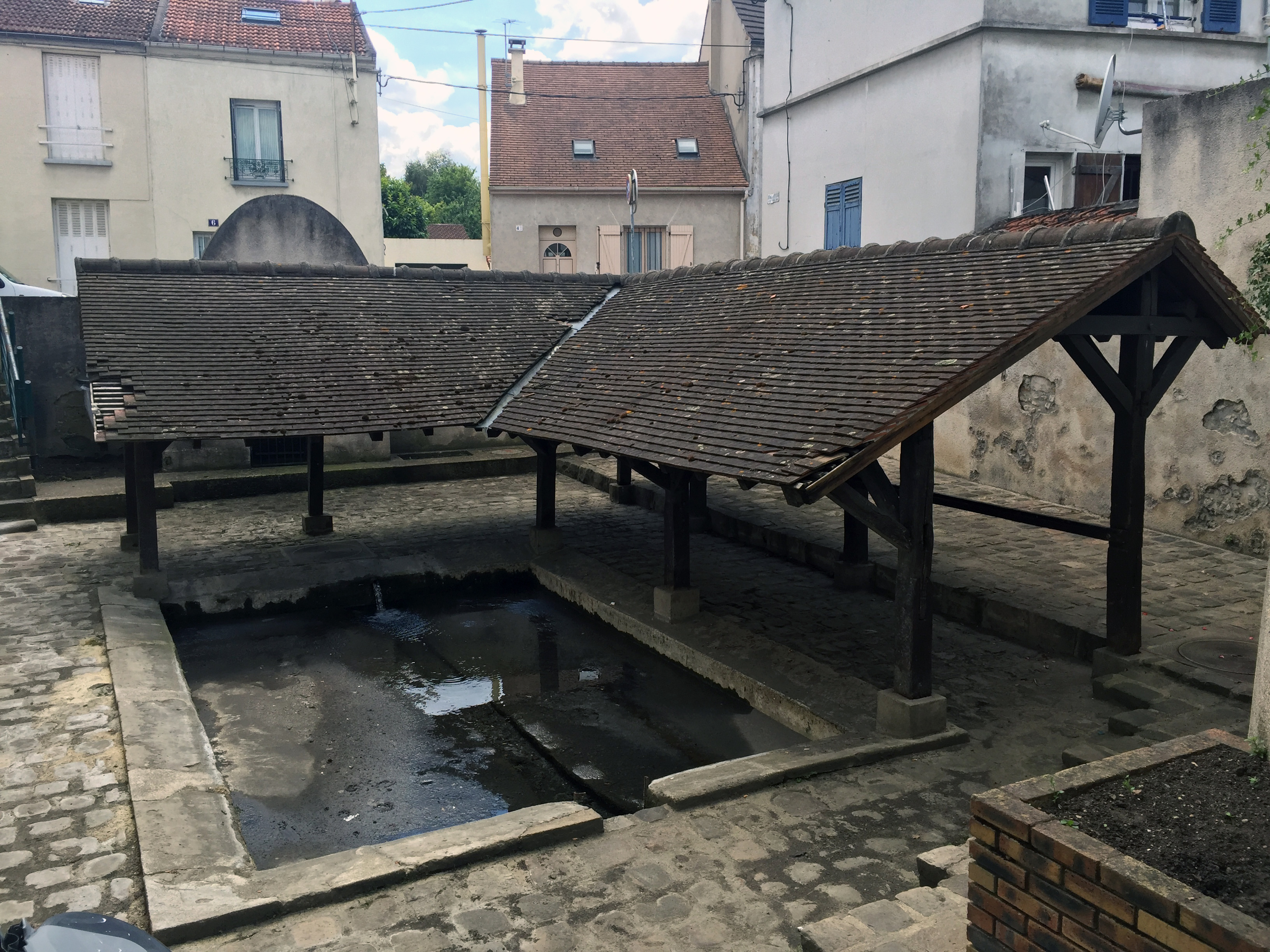
Lavoir

== Location ==
Wissous is located in the Longboyau plain, between the valleys of the Bièvre, the Orge, the Seine, and the Yvette.

== Economy ==
OpenSkies, an airline, is headquartered in Paray Vieille Poste, near Wissous. Prior to its re-establishment as OpenSkies, the airline L'Avion (Elysair SAS) was headquartered in that location. Kyocera Fineceramics Group has its design centre in Orlytech in Paray-Vieille-Poste, near Wissous. Dormeuil's headquarters are 3 avenue Jeanne Garnerin, Wissous, 91320.

== Education ==
Schools in Wissous include:

- Groupe scolaire Victor-Baloche (combined elementary school and preschool)
- Ecole maternelle La Fontaine (preschool)
- Ecole élémentaire La Fontaine

The commune includes a library.

== Coat of arms and logo ==
Wissous coat of arms

The coat of arms contains three fleurs de lys, symbolizing Ile-de-France, on an azure background. On a red background, there are six ears of corn, which represent the agricultural activity in the commune. Each two ears have one gear underneath; the gears represent the importance of economic activity. The commune's logo, placed on official documents, has one fleur de lys, one gear, and one ear of corn.

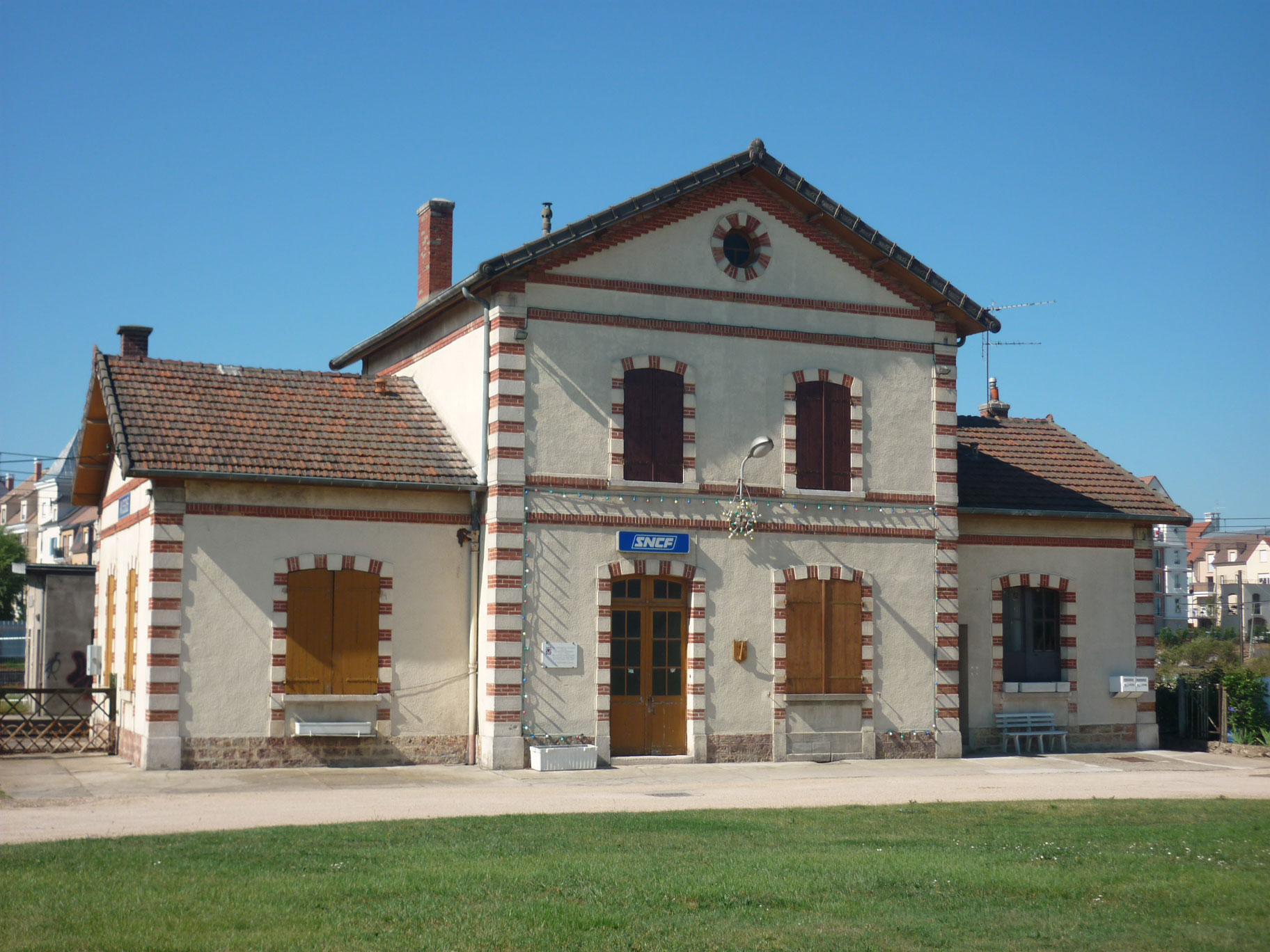
Wissous old Station of SNCF

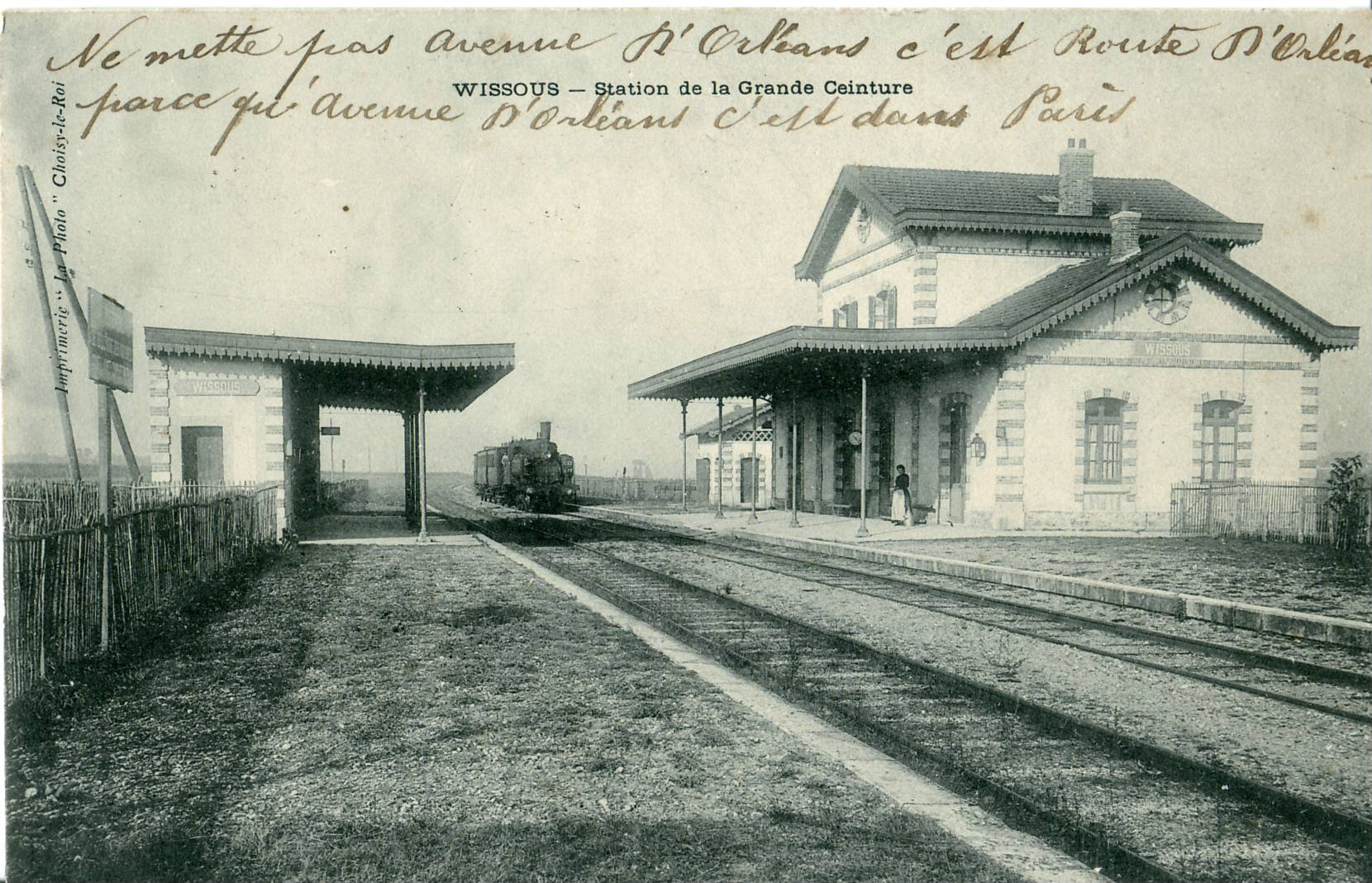
Wissous old Station, c. 1905

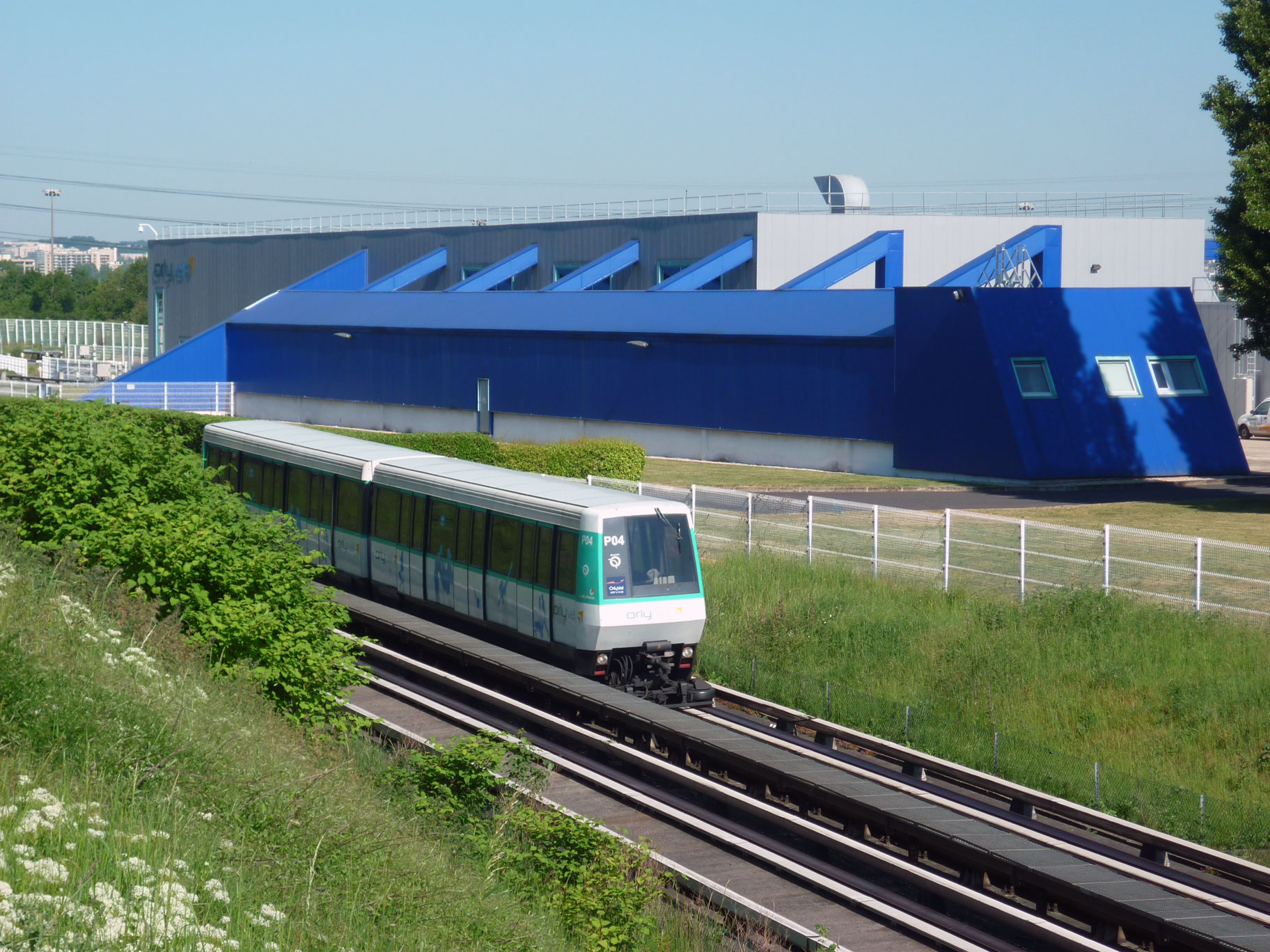
Orlyval

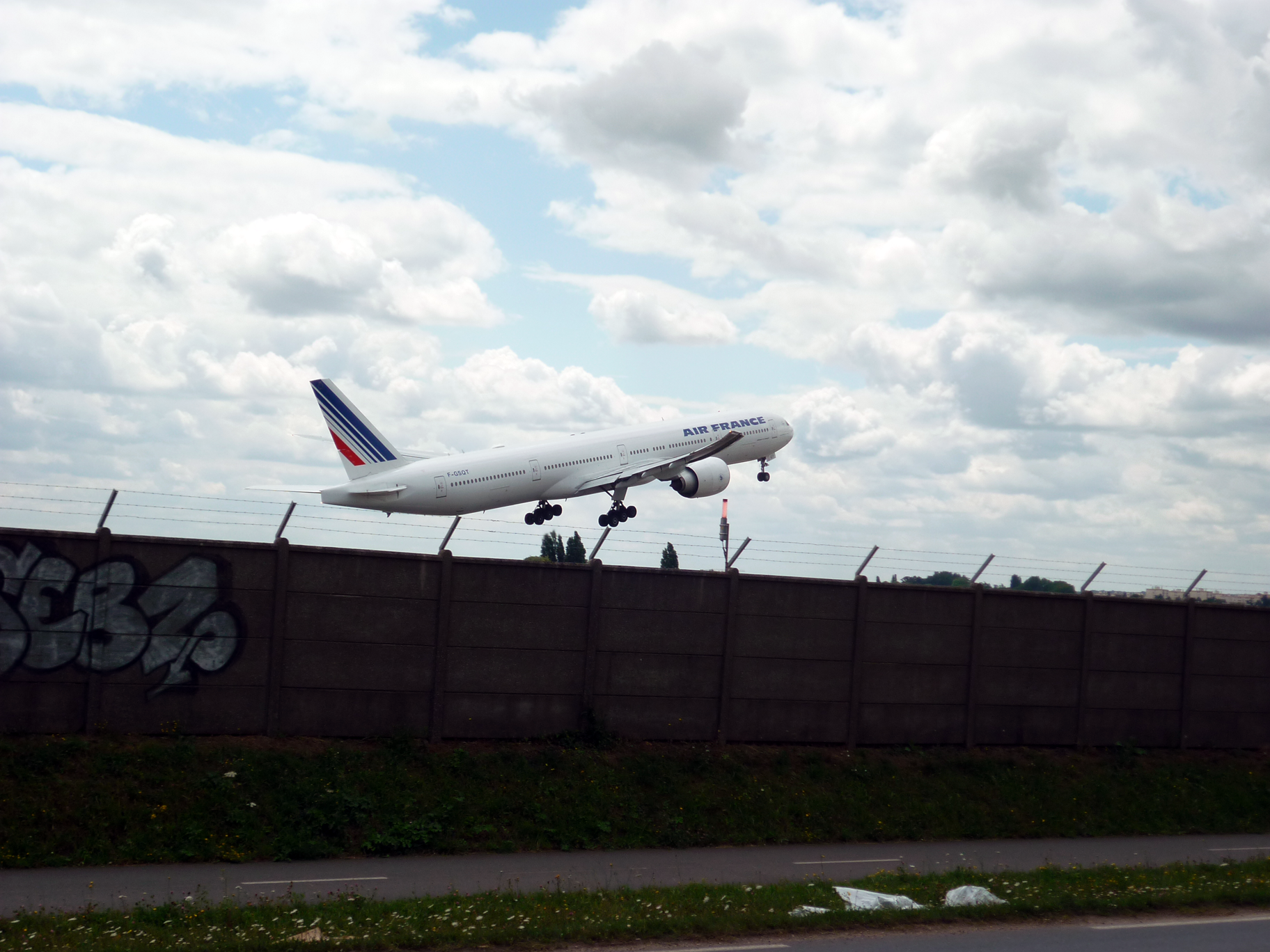
Take off at the airport

Map of Wissous

== See also ==
- Communes of the Essonne department
