= Trial (disambiguation) =

A trial is the presentation of information in a formal setting, usually a court.

(The) Trial or Trials may also refer to:

== Film and television ==
=== Films ===
- The Trial (1948 film), an Austrian film directed by Georg Wilhelm Pabst and based on the Tiszaeszlár affair
- Trial (film), a 1955 American film
- The Trial (1962 film), a French-Italian-German film directed by Orson Welles and starring Anthony Perkins, based on the Kafka novel
- The Trial (1993 film), a British film directed by David Hugh Jones and starring Kyle MacLachlan and Anthony Hopkins
- The Trial (2006 film), a Peruvian film directed by Judith Vélez
- The Trial (2009 film), an Irish documentary on the trial of Kosovo's former prime minister Ramush Haradinaj for war crimes
- The Trial (2010 film), an American film directed by Gary Wheeler and based on the novel by Robert Whitlow
- The Trial (2014 film), a Filipino film directed by Chito S. Rono
- The Trial: The State of Russia vs Oleg Sentsov, a Polish-Czech-Estonian documentary film by Askold Kurov
- The Trial (2023 film), an Indian Telugu-language thriller film

=== TV ===
==== Series ====
- Trial (British TV series), a 1971 British TV series, starring Godfrey James
- The Trial (Italian TV series), a 2019 Italian TV series
- The Trial (Indian TV series), a 2023 Indian TV series
- The Trial (2025 film), a British television drama film directed by Michael Samuels from a screenplay by Mark Burt
- Goliath (TV series), a 2015 Amazon Prime television series that was originally titled "Trial" but later renamed

==== Episodes ====
- "Trial" (Batman: The Animated Series), 1995
- "The Trial" (Angel), 2000
- "The Trial" (The Colbys), 1986
- "The Trial" (Dilbert), 1999
- "The Trial" (Dynasty 1984)
- "The Trial" (Dynasty 1986)
- "The Trial" (Dynasty 1988)
- "The Trial" (My Name Is Earl), 2007
- "The Trial" (Recess), 1997
- "The Trial" (Rugrats), 1991
- "The Trial" (Steven Universe), 2017
- "The Trial", an episode of Strange Experiences, 1956
- The Trial (What We Do in the Shadows)
- "The Trial", an episode of Zero One 1963
- "The Trial", an unproduced episode of Invader Zim

== Literature ==
- The Trial, a 1925 novel by Franz Kafka
- Trial, a 1955 novel by Don Mankiewicz

== Music ==
=== Bands and musicians ===
- The Trial (Czech band), a 1990s synthpop band from the Czech Republic
- The Trial (German band), a German-Turkish-Swiss alternative/experimental band
- Trials (musician) (born 1983), Australian rapper and producer
- Trial (San Francisco Bay Area band), a post-punk band
- Trial (Seattle band), a political straight-edge hardcore band
- Trials (band), an American heavy metal band
- Trial (Swedish band), heavy metal band signed to Metal Blade Records

=== Albums ===
- Trial (album), a 2012 album by the Pillows

=== Songs ===
- "The Trial" (song), a song from the 1979 Pink Floyd album The Wall
- "Trials", a song by Starset from the 2019 album Divisions

== People ==
- Trials (musician) (born 1983), Australian rapper and producer
- Antoine Trial (1737–1795), French tenor

== Theatre ==
- An Triail, Irish-language play by Máiréad Ní Ghráda, unrelated to the Kafka novel
- "Trial", scene 2 from the first act of Einstein on the Beach, composed by Philip Glass
- Der Prozeß (opera), a 1953 production with music by Gottfried von Einem and a libretto by Boris Blacher
- The Trial (2014 opera), a 2014 production with music by Philip Glass and a libretto by Christopher Hampton

== Other uses ==
- Clinical trial, an experimental study in a medical context
- Time trial, a form of competition in racing sports, often used as a preliminary qualification round
- Trials (journal), an online open-access medical journal
- Trial (grammatical number), a grammatical number referring to 'three items'
- The Trial (painting), a 1947 painting by Sidney Nolan
- Trial (ship), several ships
- Trials (series), a platform racing video game series and the first game in the series

== See also ==
- Bisha'a, trial by ordeal among the Bedouin
- Evaluation
- Mistrial (disambiguation)
- Trial by fire (disambiguation)
- Trial Run (disambiguation)
- Try (disambiguation)
- Tryall, a ship which was wrecked in 1622
