= Agni Pareeksha =

Agni Pareeksha or Agni Pariksha (lit. 'trial by fire') may refer to:

- Agni Pariksha, a trial by fire described in the Hinduism, notably in the Sanskrit epic Ramayana
- Agni Pariksha (1954 film), an Indian Bengali-language film, starring Uttam Kumar and Suchitra Sen
- Agni Pareeksha (1968 film), an Indian Malayalam-language film
- Agni Pareeksha (1981 film), an Indian Hindi-language film by B. R. Chopra, starting Amol Palekar
- Agni Parikshya, a 2005 Indian Odia-language film starring Sidhant Mohapatra
- Agnipariksha (2009 TV series), an Indian Bengali-language TV series
- Agnipariksha (2021 TV series), an Indian Telugu-language series

== See also ==
- Agni Parikrama, circuambulation around fire in Hinduism
- Khuda Haafiz: Chapter 2 – Agni Pariksha, a 2022 Indian film
- Trial by fire (disambiguation)
- Agneepath (disambiguation)
