= Trial by fire =

Trial by fire may refer to:

== Law ==
- Trial by fire (law), a form of trial by ordeal

== Film and television ==
=== Films ===
- Trial by Fire (1995 film), a 1995 television film starring Keith Carradine
- Trial by Fire (2008 film), a Canadian television adventure film
- Trial by Fire (2018 film), an American biographical film about Cameron Todd Willingham
- "Trial by Fire", a chapter from the 2026 Indian film Dhurandhar: The Revenge

=== Television ===
- Trial By Fire (Indian web series), 2023 Indian television series

Episodes

- "Trial by Fire" (The 4400)
- "Trial by Fire" (The A-Team)
- "Trial by Fire" (Fantastic Four: World's Greatest Heroes)
- "Trial by Fire" (The Fugitive)
- "Trial by Fire" (Grimm)
- "Trial by Fire" (The Outer Limits)
- "Trial by Fire" (Shark)
- "Trial by Fire" (Voltron: Legendary Defender)

== Games ==
- Trial by Fire (Judges Guild), a 1981 adventure for fantasy role-playing games
- Trial by Fire (Ars Magica), a 1991 adventure for the role-playing game Ars Magica
- Quest for Glory II: Trial by Fire, a 1990 video game

== Literature ==
- Trial by Fire, a 1985 novel by Richard Austin; the second installment in the Guardians series
- Trial by Fire (Spence book), a 1986 book by Gerry Spence
- Trial by Fire, a 1987 novel attributed to Carolyn Keene; the fifteenth installment in The Nancy Drew Files
- Trial by Fire, a 1990 novel by Frances Fyfield
- Trial by Fire, a 1992 novel by Harold Coyle
- Trial by Fire, a 1992 novel by Rebecca York
- Trial by Fire, a 1995 novel by Nancy Taylor Rosenberg
- Trial by Fire, a 2000 novel by Terri Blackstock
- Trial by Fire, a 2002 novel by James Reasoner; the second installment in The Last Good War trilogy
- Trial by Fire, a 2002 novel by Rachel Roberts; the sixth installment in the Avalon: Web of Magic series
- Trial by Fire (comics), a 2003 CrossGen mini-series
- Stargate SG-1: Trial by Fire, a 2004 novel by Sabine C. Bauer, based on the television series Stargate SG-1
- Trial by Fire, a 2004 novel by Greg Farshtey; the second installment in the Bionicle Adventures series
- Trial by Fire, a 2009 novel by J. A. Jance; the fifth installment in the Ali Reynolds series
- Terminator Salvation: Trial by Fire, a 2010 novel by Timothy Zahn, based on the 2009 film Terminator Salvation
- The Last Airbender: Trial by Fire, a 2010 junior novel by Michael Teitelbaum, based on the 2010 film The Last Airbender
- Trial by Fire, a 2011 novel by Jennifer Lynn Barnes; the second installment in the Raised by Wolves book series
- Trial by Fire, a 2011 novel attributed to Don Pendleton; the 394th installment in The Executioner book series
- Stranded 2: Trial by Fire, a 2013 novel by Jeff Probst and Chris Tebbetts; the second installment in the Stranded trilogy
- Trial by Fire, a 2014 novel by Charles Gannon; the second installment in the Tales of the Terran Republic series
- Trial by Fire, a 2021 novel by Warren Murphy and Richard Sapir; the 155th installment in The Destroyer novel series
- Trial by Fire, a 2024 novel by Danielle Steel

== Music ==
=== Albums ===
- Trial by Fire (Journey album), or the title song, 1996
- Trial by Fire (Yelawolf album), or the title song, 2017
- Trial by Fire: Live in Leningrad, by Yngwie J. Malmsteen, 1989
- Trial by Fire, by the Brandos, unreleased (1990)
- Trial by Fire: Greatest and Latest, by Bachman-Turner Overdrive, 1996

=== Songs ===
- "Trial by Fire" (song), by Saul, 2019
- "Trial by Fire", by Jefferson Airplane from Long John Silver, 1972
- "Trial by Fire", by Judas Priest from Invincible Shield, 2024
- "Trial by Fire", by Kiss from Asylum, 1985
- "Trial by Fire", by Odette from Herald, 2021
- "Trial by Fire", by Testament from The New Order, 1988

== See also ==
- Trial (disambiguation)
- Agni Pareeksha (disambiguation)
