= Frantz Yvelin =

French businessman (born 1976)

- Born: 1976 (age 49–50); Lagny-sur-Marne
- Education: Commercial pilot
- Occupation: President of Aigle Azur

Frantz Yvelin is a French businessman, pilot, and serial entrepreneur. He was the President of Aigle Azur, France's 2nd largest airline until August 26, 2019. Frantz Yvelin previously created and ran two French independent scheduled Airlines, (La Compagnie and L'Avion).

== Early life and education ==
A commercial pilot since the age of 21, Yvelin is type-rated on Airbus A320, Boeing 737, Boeing 757, Boeing 767, Cessna Citation and McDonnell Douglas MD80.

== Career ==
Yvelin started his career as an IT consultant (for GFI Informatique, CS Communication & Systèmes). In 2006 he founded and ran Europe's first all-Business-Class airline, L'Avion, before selling it to British Airways. (In 2009, L'Avion became OpenSkies and has since operated under that brand). Yvelin was Head of Strategy and Development for OpenSkies for a time after it was merged with L'Avion.

In 2013, along with La Compagnie, Frantz created a French holding company called Dreamjet Participations, which he ran as President and CEO until the end of 2016. Dreamjet Participations acquired 100% of French leisure airline XL Airways in 2016.

Along with Peter Luethi, La Compagnie's co-founder, he has been an air transport advisor for three years and was a lecturer in air transportation economics at the École nationale de l'aviation civile (teaching the Mastère spécialisé course). In parallel, he has helped to develop an airliners' ferry and flight testing company based in the USA.
