= Zienteck =

Role-playing game adventure

- Code: Cover
- Authors: Mark Harmon
- First published: 1981

Zienteck is an adventure for fantasy role-playing games published by Judges Guild in 1981.

== Plot summary ==
Zienteck is an adventure scenario intended for characters of level 5-9 which takes place inside a vast dungeon complex. The book includes detailed tables for generating wandering monster encounters and descriptions of several wilderness encounters around the area.

Legends tell that what is left of the stronghold of the wizard Zienteck lies beyond the infamous Black Angel Woods, and that his books of magic and treasure may have survived the destruction caused by Griendal the Dragon. This adventure also includes encounter tables for locations such as the Black Angel Woods and the Dragon Mountains, game statistics for two new monsters (black angels and fire chameleons), maps of the wilderness and the lair of the dragon, and details of the Zienteck dungeon with an optional map for the players.

== Publication history ==
Zienteck was written by Mark Harmon, and was published by Judges Guild in 1981 as a 32-page book.

TSR chose not to renew its Dungeons & Dragons license with Judges Guild when that license expired in September 1980. Judges Guild was able to keep their Advanced Dungeons & Dragons license for another year, allowing them to publish adventures like The Illhiedrin Book (1981), Zienteck (1981), Trial by Fire (1981), and Portals of Twilight (1981) before ending that line.

== Reception ==
Anders Swenson reviewed The Illhiedrin Book and Zienteck for Different Worlds magazine and stated that "Both of these books are cheap, showing a lack of the careful editing which is becoming characteristic of the major FRP houses these days. It would seem that Judges Guild has simply failed to advance their standards to keep pace with the other established publishers of adventure gaming material. Few other line, however, offer such inexpensive products, and there probably lies the tale."

W. G. Armintrout reviewed the adventure in The Space Gamer No. 55. He commented that "There are a few bright spots – a monster custom-designed by old Zienteck himself, and murals in the dungeon that clue the adventurers in as to what originally went on there. A DM will have few problems running this adventure." He called it "Just a hack-and-slash adventure. All clues are worthless, the wilderness map is 80% unexplained [...] and the narrator's idea of wit makes my gorge rise. The only NPCs are the dragons themselves." Armintrout concluded the review by saying, "What a bore! An intrepid 12-year-old could do just as well, and perhaps better. Don't buy Zienteck."
