= The Illhiedrin Book =

Tabletop role-playing game supplement

- Code: Cover
- Authors: Daniel Hauffe
- First published: 1981

The Illhiedrin Book is an adventure for fantasy role-playing games published by Judges Guild in 1981.

== Plot summary ==
The Illhiedrin Book is an adventure scenario intended for player characters of levels 1-2, who are hired to find a magical book that may be hidden in the Tomb of Charrellsfane or a wizard's tower, while the residents of both locations try to stop them, and competing parties of adventurers try to get the book first.

The Illhiedrin Book was designed to be used with first-level characters, allowing the possibility of second level characters joining them. Alcastra the wizard wants to obtain the Illheidrin Book, which was last possessed by a wizard who died 300 years ago, and she will equip a party to go look for it, in the places she thinks it might be. The adventurers travel the countryside, finding clues, discovering a mysterious crypt, and dealing with the patrols of invading orcs along the way.

== Publication history ==
The Illhiedrin Book was written by Daniel Hauffe, and was published by Judges Guild in 1981 as a 32-page book.

TSR chose not to renew its Dungeons & Dragons license with Judges Guild when that license expired in September 1980. Judges Guild was able to keep their Advanced Dungeons & Dragons license for another year, allowing them to publish adventures like The Illhiedrin Book (1981), Zienteck (1981), Trial by Fire (1981), and Portals of Twilight (1981) before ending that line.

== Reception ==
Anders Swenson reviewed The Illhiedrin Book and Zienteck for Different Worlds magazine and stated that "Both of these books are cheap, showing a lack of the careful editing which is becoming characteristic of the major FRP houses these days. It would seem that Judges Guild has simply failed to advance their standards to keep pace with the other established publishers of adventure gaming material. Few other line, however, offer such inexpensive products, and there probably lies the tale."

W. G. Armintrout reviewed the adventure in The Space Gamer No. 53. He stated that "This is a good, sound adventure; I wish more of these were available for low-level characters. There are complete descriptions of everything you might run into, including Alcastra's Tower (for those who attack everything in sight). The DM will have no trouble with this adventure." He continued, "Judges Guild" still falls short of perfection. There are minor discrepancies between maps and descriptions. The artwork takes up space instead of supporting the adventure. I can't explain why Lieutenant Sladentail is pictured as a griffon when he's human, and I suspect Alcastra is naked on the cover to spark sales. Worst of all, the characters are never really fleshed out – the DM will know how to run them, but he may never figure out why they are in this adventure in the first place. A good adventure, but still short of excellent." Armintrout concluded his review by saying, "I urge everyone who plays AD&D to buy this one. It's a challenge to anyone with a first-level character, and a solid example for the newcomer DM."
