= Agneepath =

Agneepath or Agnipath may refer to:

- "Agnipath" (lit. 'fire path'), a Hindi poem by Harivansh Rai Bachchan
- Agneepath (1990 film), a 1990 Indian film, titled after the poem
- Agneepath (2012 film), a 2012 Indian film, remake of the 1990 film
  - Agneepath (soundtrack), soundtrack album of the 2012 film
- Agneepath (TV series), an Indian soap opera
- Agnipath Scheme, an Indian military recruitment scheme

== See also ==
- Agni Pareeksha (disambiguation)
