= Portals of Twilight =

Tabletop role-playing game supplement

- Cover
- Genre: Role-playing game
- Publisher: Judges Guild
- Media type: Print

Portals of Twilight is a supplement for fantasy role-playing games published by Judges Guild in 1981.

== Contents ==
Portals of Twilight is a fantasy campaign setting supplement focusing on a world that characters can travel to using magical portals. The book describes 32 wilderness locations and a city, and provides game statistics for new monsters.

== Publication history ==
Portals of Twilight was written by Rudy Kraft, and was published by Judges Guild in 1981 as a 48-page book.

TSR chose not to renew its Dungeons & Dragons license with Judges Guild when that license expired in September 1980. Judges Guild was able to keep their Advanced Dungeons & Dragons license for another year, allowing them to publish adventures like The Illhiedrin Book (1981), Zienteck (1981), Trial by Fire (1981), and Portals of Twilight (1981) before ending that line.

== Reception ==
Michael Stackpole reviewed Portals of Twilight in The Space Gamer No. 50. The review states that "The real worth of a product is determined by how it sets the atmosphere for an adventure and what sort of characters will be met and dealt with in the adventure." Stackpole continued: "In this work, Rudy Kraft does a fine job of setting up atmosphere and all that in the first ten pages. Then the rest of the 44-page booklet is used for charts and tables. No personalities or anything."
