= La Compagnie =

French airline

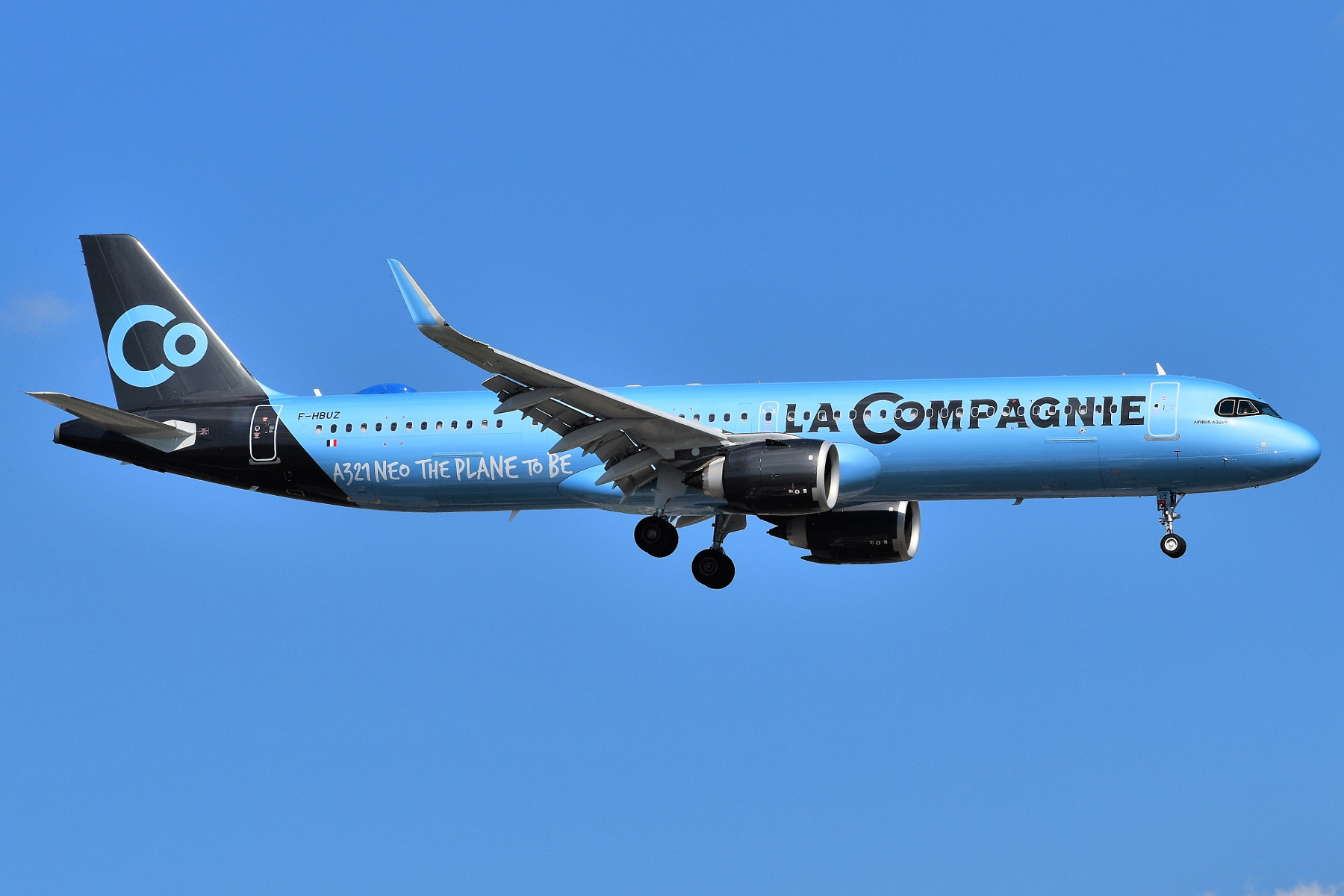
- Airbus A321neo
| IATA | ICAO | Call sign |
|---|---|---|
| B0 | DJT | DREAMJET |
- Founded: 2013
- Commenced operations: 21 July 2014
- Operating bases: Paris–Orly
- Frequent-flyer program: My Compagnie
- Fleet size: 2
- Destinations: 5
- Parent company: DreamJet Participations
- Headquarters: Bagneux, Hauts-de-Seine, France
- Key people: Christian Vernet (president and CEO)
- Website: lacompagnie.com

La Compagnie (French: [la kɔ̃paɲi]), legally incorporated as DreamJet SAS, is a French boutique airline founded by Frantz Yvelin and based at Orly Airport, with headquarters in Bagneux, Hauts-de-Seine in the Paris metropolitan area. It operates all-business class flights within Europe and to Newark Liberty International Airport.

== History ==
The airline was founded as DreamJet SAS in October 2013. It was created and run by French airline entrepreneur Frantz Yvelin, with the support of Peter Luethi, Yann Poudoulec, Francois Ledreux, Nicolas Jurczyk, and Pierre-Hugues Schmit among a few others, in the hopes of making an all-business class airline with a true low-cost structure, offering business class fares significantly cheaper than those of legacy carriers. Frantz Yvelin served as the airline's CEO for its first four years, until the end of 2016. Prior to La Compagnie, Frantz Yvelin had been the founder of L'Avion, which was sold to British Airways and later became OpenSkies. Yvelin's deputy was Peter Luethi, the former COO of Indian airline Jet Airways.

The first scheduled revenue flight, already under the new and definitive La Compagnie (English: The Company) name, operated from Charles de Gaulle Airport to Newark Liberty International Airport on 21 July 2014 using a Boeing 757-200. On 24 April 2015, the airline started a second scheduled route from London Luton Airport to Newark.

In April 2016, Frantz Yvelin announced La Compagnie was considering a fleet renewal and expansion with Airbus A321neo aircraft, which it had later confirmed with an order for two Airbus A321neos in September 2017. In September 2016, the airline announced the suspension of its route from London Luton to Newark and its intention to instead launch a second daily frequency between Paris Charles de Gaulle and Newark, citing economic reasons linked to Brexit. In December 2016, La Compagnie's sole holding, DreamJet Participations, which was also founded and run by Frantz Yvelin, acquired 100% of XL Group Ltd., the holding company of XL Airways France, and the two airlines joined forces with the transaction completed by 12 September 2018. In September 2017, the airline announced that it was offering all-you-can-fly passes for its Newark to Paris route, costing $40,000 per year.

In April 2018, La Compagnie relocated its Paris operations from Charles de Gaulle Airport to Orly Airport. On 5 December 2018, the airline announced a new seasonal service to Nice Côte d'Azur Airport from Newark to begin on 6 May 2019. Also in May 2019, the airline took delivery of its first Airbus A321neo. In September 2019, the airline took delivery of its second Airbus A321neo, and subsequently retired both of its Boeing 757 aircraft by the end of October 2019.

In March 2020, La Compagnie announced it would suspend its commercial operations as of the 18th of that month due to the COVID-19 pandemic. Commercial operations were initially expected to resume on 1 June 2020, but were subsequently postponed several times. During the suspensions, the airline received a total of €20 million in governmental loans, provided some ad-hoc charter services, and operated a limited number of flights for the December 2020 holiday season. After fifteen months of suspensions, the airline's regular commercial flights eventually resumed on 12 June 2021. Following the resumption of service, the airline on 18 June 2021 announced two new destinations to its network, consisting of summer seasonal flights between Paris Orly and Tel Aviv to begin on 21 July 2021, and flights between Newark and Milan Malpensa to begin on 29 November 2021, however, both routes were subsequently postponed, with the Tel Aviv flights delayed from a summer to a winter launch, and the Milan flights delayed to summer 2022. In July 2021, the airline was reported to be considering the operation of Airbus A321XLR aircraft. On 9 December 2021, AfriJet announced it had partnered with La Compagnie to launch seasonal flights between Paris Orly and Libreville's Léon-Mba International Airport from 16 December 2021, in place of La Compagnie's services to Tel Aviv which were further postponed, before eventually being cancelled.

In February 2023, La Compagnie reported that it recorded its first profit in 2022, consisting of 1 million euros, and additionally announced that it planned to add two Airbus A321LR aircraft to its fleet, for delivery in 2024 and 2025. This however was later adjusted for the first A321LR to be delivered in 2026.

== Services ==
=== Cabin ===
La Compagnie's aircraft are equipped with an all-business class cabin arranged in a 2–2 configuration, consisting of 76 seats that convert to flat beds. Inflight entertainment is provided on 15.7 inch (40 cm) seatback touchscreens, and inflight Wi-Fi access provided by Viasat is also available. Food is served in a two-course meal. La Compagnie uses contracted lounges for its passengers.

=== Frequent flyer program ===
My Compagnie is La Compagnie's frequent-flyer program, through which passengers can earn points on flights, as well as by referring others to register for the program. Points accrued can be redeemed towards award flights on La Compagnie and towards itinerary changes for flights that have already been booked, avoiding the monetary fees for changes in the process.

== Destinations ==
La Compagnie serves or has previously served the following destinations as of February 2024:

| Country | City | Airport | Start date | End date | Notes | Refs |
|---|---|---|---|---|---|---|
| France | Nice | Nice Côte d'Azur Airport | 6 May 2019 | Present | Seasonal | |
| France | Paris | Charles de Gaulle Airport | 21 July 2014 | 21 April 2018 | Terminated (Base) | |
| France | Paris | Orly Airport | 22 April 2018 | Present | Base | |
| Gabon | Libreville | Léon-Mba International Airport | 16 December 2021 | 14 March 2022 | Terminated | |
| Germany | Düsseldorf | Düsseldorf Airport | 21 April 2027 | - | Future | |
| Italy | Milan | Milan Malpensa Airport | 15 April 2022 | Present | | |
| Sint Maarten | Philipsburg | Princess Juliana International Airport | 18 February 2024 | Present | Seasonal charter | |
| United Kingdom | London | Luton Airport | 24 April 2015 | 25 September 2016 | Terminated | |
| United States | Newark | Newark Liberty International Airport | 21 July 2014 | Present | | |

=== Airline partnerships ===
While La Compagnie does not have codeshare agreements, the airline partners with easyJet through its Worldwide by easyJet program, and it also has a partnership with Hahn Air.

== Fleet ==
=== Current fleet ===
As of July 2026, La Compagnie operates the following aircraft:

| Aircraft | In service | Orders | Passengers | Notes |
|---|---|---|---|---|
| Airbus A321LR | — | 2 | TBA | Deliveries from 2026. |
| Airbus A321neo | 2 | — | 76 | |
| Total | 2 | 2 | | |

=== Former fleet ===
As of August 2025, La Compagnie operated 2 Airbus A321neo.

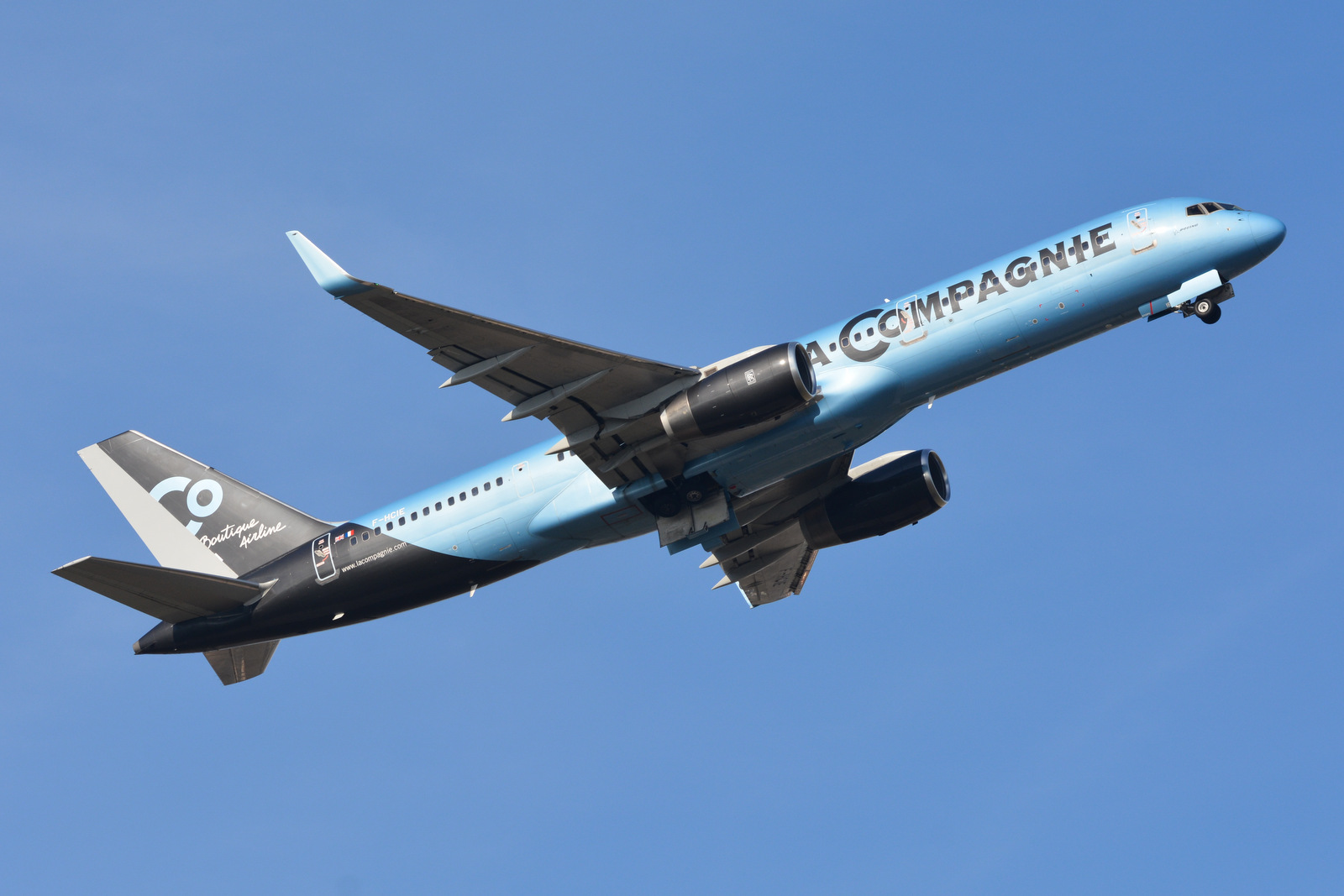
A Boeing 757-200 in 2019

| Aircraft | Total | Introduced | Retired | Replacement |
|---|---|---|---|---|
| Boeing 757-200 | 2 | 2014 | 2019 | Airbus A321neo |

== Corporation ==
The headquarters were formerly in Le Bourget, and Arcueil.
