= Paray-Vieille-Poste =

Commune in Île-de-France, France

- Commune
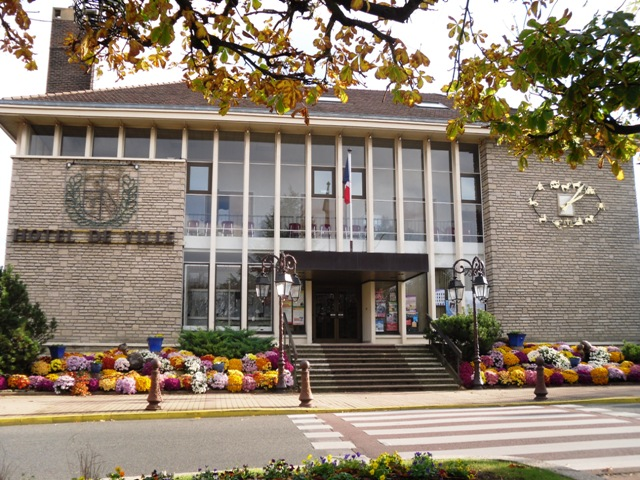
- The town hall in Paray-Vieille-Poste

- Coat of arms
- Location of Paray-Vieille-Poste
- Location within France Location within Île-de-France (region)
- Coordinates: 48°42′46″N 2°21′49″E
- Country: France
- Region: Île-de-France
- Department: Essonne
- Arrondissement: Palaiseau
- Canton: Athis-Mons
- Intercommunality: Grand Paris

Government
  - Mayor (2020–2026): Nathalie Lallier
- Area^{1}: 6.14 km^{2} (2.37 sq mi)
- Highest elevation: 94 m (308 ft)
- Lowest elevation: 82 m (269 ft)
- Population (2023): 8,202
  - Density: 1,340/km^{2} (3,460/sq mi)
- Demonym: Paraysiens
- Time zone: UTC+01:00 (CET)
  - Summer (DST): UTC+02:00 (CEST)
- INSEE/Postal code: 91479 /91550
- Website: www.paray-vieille-poste.fr
- ^{1} French Land Register data, which excludes lakes, ponds, glaciers > 1 km^{2} (0.386 sq mi or 247 acres) and river estuaries.

Paray-Vieille-Poste (French pronunciation: [paʁɛ vjɛj pɔst]; lit. 'Paray-Old Post') is a commune in the Essonne department in Île-de-France in northern France. It is in the southern outer suburbs of Paris, on the departmental border with Val-de-Marne. Orly Airport is partially located in the commune.

== History ==
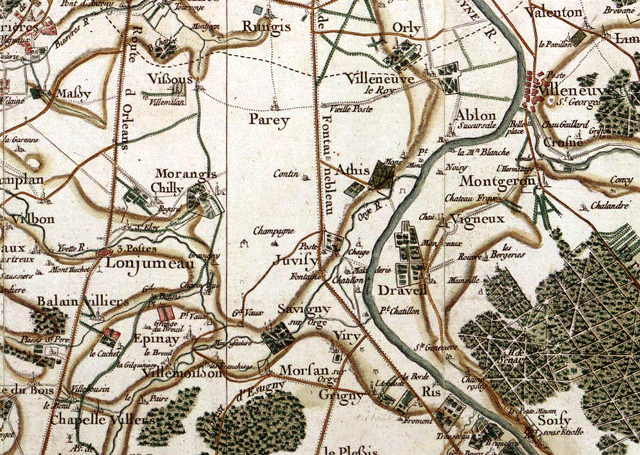
Map of the Paray-Vieille-Poste area in the 17th century by Cassini

Paray-Vieille-Poste originated from the old village of Paray, which had about 60 residents in 1790.

The name "Paray-Vieille-Poste" first appeared in 1923. By 1928 the population swelled to 3,000 residents. At the time streets had not yet been built, and running water had not yet been installed. The Sarraut law of 15 March 1928 lead to the quick establishment of vital infrastructure. In 1931 Paray-Vieille-Poste received electricity and water connections, and the work was completed by 1933. The commune was affected by World War II bombings against Orly Airport.

== Population ==
Inhabitants of Paray-Vieille-Poste are known as Paraysiens (masculine) and Paraysiennes (feminine) in French.

Historical population
Year	Pop.	±% p.a.
1968	7,395	—
1975	7,670	+0.52%
1982	7,122	−1.05%
1990	7,214	+0.16%
1999	7,188	−0.04%
2007	7,179	−0.02%
2012	7,230	+0.14%
2017	7,457	+0.62%
2023	8,202	+1.60%
Source: INSEE

== Coat of arms ==
Coat of arms of Paray-Vieille-Poste

The coat of arms contains bugles of the postilions announcing their passage to tell bystanders to move out of the way, the arms of the Abbey of Saint-Germain-des-Prés, and the arms of the Maréchal de Vaux.

== Economy ==
Transavia France has its head office in Paray Vieille Poste. OpenSkies is headquartered in Paray Vieille Poste. Prior to its re-establishment as OpenSkies, the airline L'Avion (Elysair SAS) was headquartered in that location. Kyocera Fineceramics Group has its design centre in Orlytech in Paray-Vieille-Poste.

Prior to its disestablishment, Air Inter (as Air France Europe) had its head office in the commune. AOM French Airlines had its head office in Building 363 at Orly Airport and in Paray-Vieille-Poste. After AOM and Air Liberté merged in 2001, the new airline occupied building 363.

== Education ==
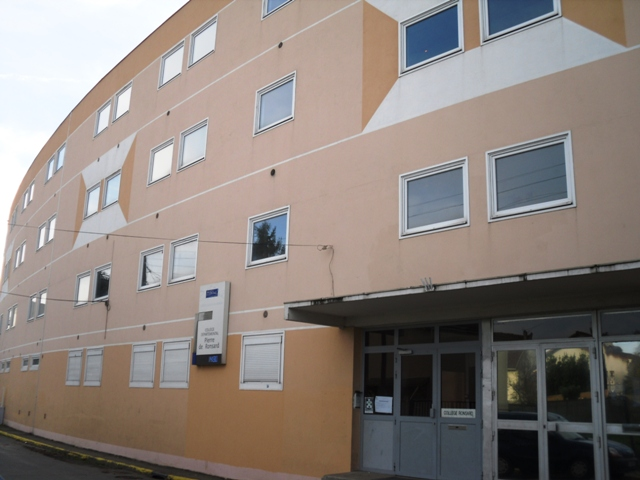
Collège Pierre-de-Ronsard

Schools in Paray-Vieille-Poste include École Maternelle Victor-Hugo, École Primaire Jules-Ferry, École Paul-Bert (Maternelle and Primaire), and Collège Pierre-de-Ronsard. As of 2016 440 students attend Collège Pierre-de-Ronsard.

The Saint-Exupéry Library (Bibliothèque Saint-Exupéry) serves the village.

== Gallery ==
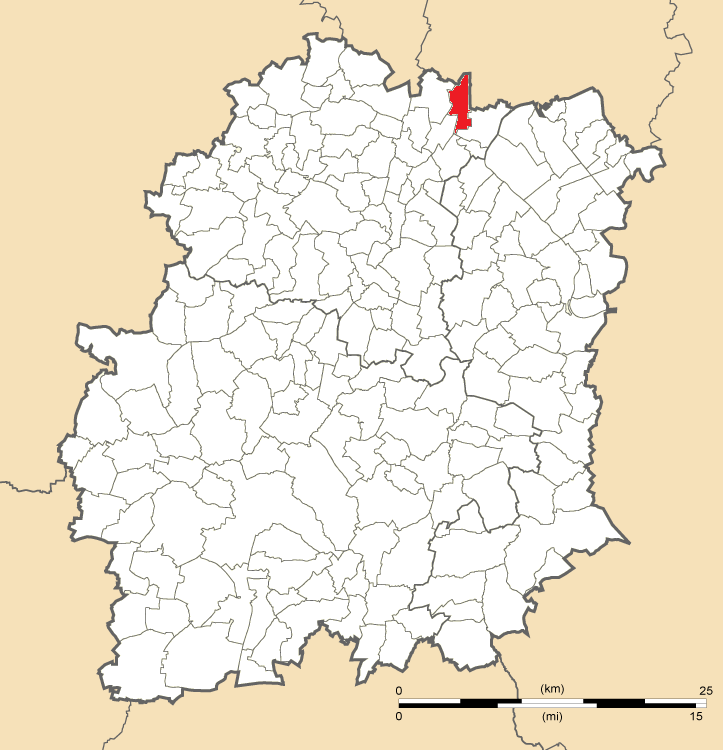
Location of Paray-Vieille-Poste in Essonne

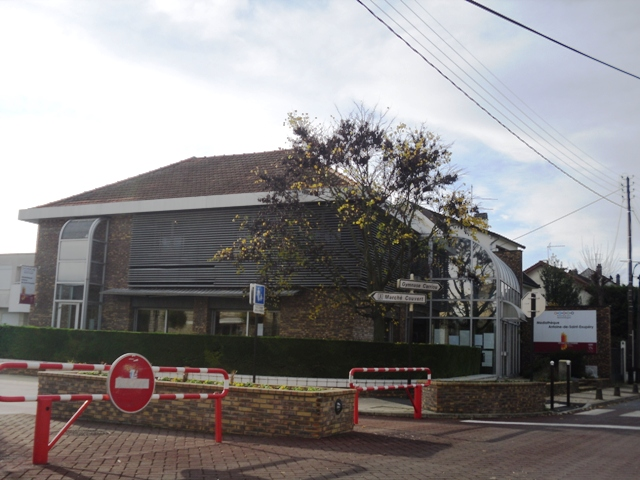
Antoine de Saint-Exupéry Library

== See also ==
- Communes of the Essonne department
