= L'Avion =

French airline

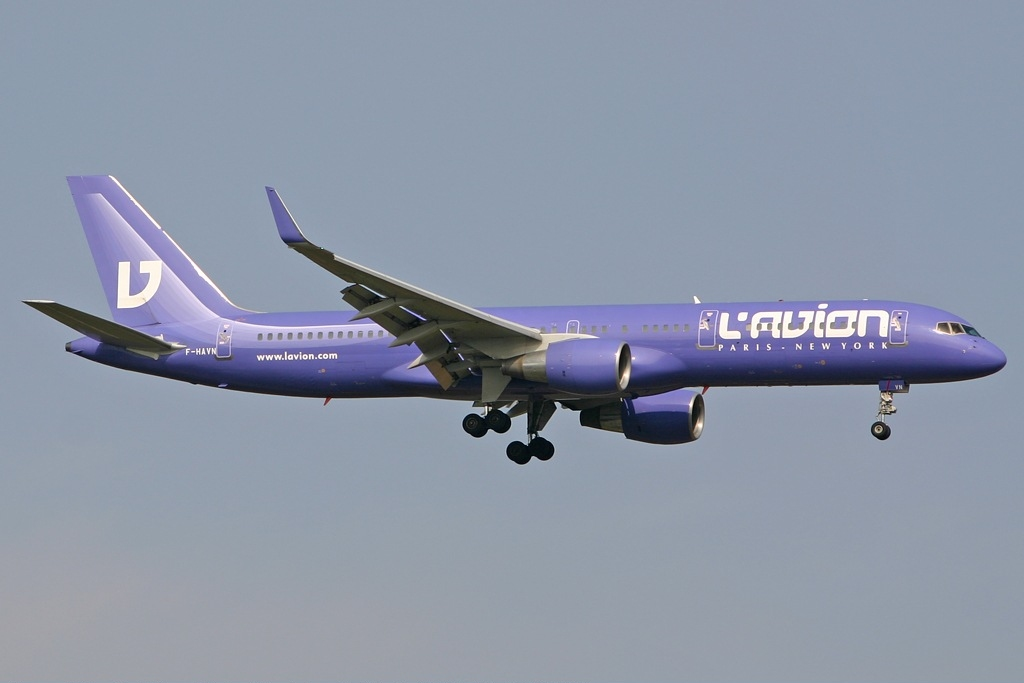
- Boeing 757-200
IATA	ICAO	Call sign
A0	AVI	ELYSAIR
- Founded: 2006 by Frantz Yvelin
- Ceased operations: 2009 (merged into OpenSkies)
- Operating bases: Orly Airport
- Fleet size: 2
- Destinations: 2
- Parent company: Elysair SAS
- Headquarters: Paray Vieille Poste, France
- Key people: Marc Rochet, CEO; Frantz Yvelin, Founder
- Website: lavion.com

Elysair SAS, trading as L'Avion (French for "The plane"), was an airline headquartered in Paray Vieille Poste, near Wissous, France. It operated a business class-only long-haul service between Orly Airport, Paris and Newark Liberty International Airport in the USA. The airline was sold to British Airways and then merged into OpenSkies, a wholly owned subsidiary of the British flag carrier.

== History ==
Founded by young French entrepreneur Frantz Yvelin and run by CEO Marc Rochet and Frantz Yvelin, was wholly owned by Société de Participation Aérienne (SPA). It changed the brand to "L'Avion" in late autumn 2006 after a market research showed the new name tested well in the US and in France. Elysair was kept as call sign. The first flight was on 3 January 2007 from Paris to Newark. The airline had plans to expand to the Middle East.

Similar to the concept that was later used by Silverjet, L'Avion offered a premium-only service on transatlantic routes. It operated two Boeing 757-200 aircraft, modified by Gamco in Abu Dhabi with detailed engineering and on-site supervision at Gamco by Northview Aviation, and maintained by Lufthansa Technik. H4 Aerospace had helped to get the certification. The aircraft had an accommodation for a total of only 90 passengers in a 2x2 abreast. The seating and service level was totally business class. It offered laptop plug at every seat, French food and wine, and seats that reclined by 140 degrees. L'Avion featured "On-Demand" digEplayer XT individual units with a 7" screen. By 2008 Elysair had approximately 100 employees.

In mid-2008 British Airways announced it had agreed to buy Elysair for £54 million. The deal was completed on July, 2 and resulted in the progressive integration into OpenSkies during the month of August. Operations of the two airlines were fully merged on 4 April 2009, with the merged airline operating as OpenSkies, a wholly owned subsidiary of British Airways.

== Destinations ==
France

- Paris - Orly Airport base

United States

- Newark - Newark Liberty International Airport

== Fleet ==
When merged with OpenSkies, Elysair fleet consisted of the following aircraft:

Aircraft	In fleet	Passengers	Notes
Boeing 757-200	2	90	All aircraft transferred to OpenSkies at merger

== See also ==
- Eos Airlines
- MAXjet Airways
- Silverjet
- La Compagnie
