= Trial Run =

A trial run is a preliminary test of the suitability of a thing or a process.

Trial Run may refer to:

- Trial Run (1969 film), US TV movie
- Trial Run (1984 film), New Zealand thriller
- Trial Run, play by Nigel Williams (author)
