= Mestral =

Mestral may refer to:

- Armand Mestral (1917–2000), French actor and singer
- George de Mestral (1907–1990), Swiss electrical engineer and inventor of the Velcro fabric fastener
- Armand de Mestral, nephew of George, Swiss-Canadian academic, Order of Canada recipient
- Mestral, a Vulcan character in the "Carbon Creek" episode of Star Trek: Enterprise, which mentioned Velcro
