= Agnipariksha (2021 TV series) =

- Genre: Family; Drama
- Based on: Aginpariksha
- Written by: Dialogues: Bangaru Naidu
- Story by: Subramanyam Oruganti
- Directed by: Puli Vasu; RR Ravindar
- Starring: Thanuja Puttaswamy; Akarsh Byramudi; Navin Vetri; Maahi Gouthami
- Country of origin: India
- Original language: Telugu
- No. of episodes: 318

Production
- Producer: Meena Vasu
- Cinematography: B Manikanta
- Editor: Raju Kasireddy
- Camera setup: Multi-camera

Original release
- Network: Zee Telugu
- Release: 18 October 2021 – 22 October 2022

Agnipariksha is an Indian Telugu language love and drama series airing on Zee Telugu from Monday - Saturday at 9:30 PM from 18 October 2021 and ended on 22 October 2022. It stars Thanuja Puttaswamy, Aakarsh Byramudi, Navin Vetri and Maahi Gouthami in lead roles. It also available on digital streaming platform ZEE5.

== Synopsis ==
Radhika and Amar love each other. Radhika leaves Amar and marries Kailash, her father's choice. Radhika starts admiring Kailash because of his love and good care. Amar avenges this betrayal by marrying Radhika's younger sister Priyanka.

== Cast ==
=== Main ===
- Thanuja Puttaswamy as Radhika; Krishna Murthy and Sujatha's elder daughter; Priyanka's sister; Kailash's wife; Shakuntala Devi's daughter-in-law; Amar's ex-lover
- Akarsh Byramudi as Amar; Radhika's ex-lover; Priyanka's husband;
- Navin Vetri / Siddharth Varma as Kailash; Radhika's husband; Shakuntala Devi's son; Krishna Murthy and Sujatha's son-in-law
- Maahi Gouthami as Priyanka; Krishna Murthy and Sujatha's younger daughter; Radhika's sister; Amar's wife;

=== Recurring ===
- Sirisha as Shankuntala Devi; Kailash's mother; Radhika's mother-in-law
- Prabhakar as Krishna Murthy; Radhika and Priyanka's father; Sujatha's husband
- Shanthi as Sujatha; Radhika and Priyanka's mother; Krishna Murthy's wife
- Anu Manasa as Aliveni; Kailash's Aunt; Malleswari's mother
- Vani Reddy as Malleswari; Aliveni's daughter;
- Puru Reddy as Alivelu's husband; Malleshwari's father
- Jeedigunta Sridhar as Satyam; Radhika and Priyanka's uncle; Lavanya's father
- Aishwarya as Lavanya; Satyam's daughter;
- Jaya Prakash as Amar's father
- Maithili as Amar's step mother
- Sainath as Amar and Radhika's classmate and friend
- Hareesh as Amar and Radhika's classmate and friend
- Pawan as Amar and Radhika's classmate and friend
- Tenali Panthulu as Kailash and Radhika's marriage priest

=== Cameo appearances ===
- Deepthi Manne as Akshara (reprised her role from Radhamma Kuthuru)
- Meghana Rami as Radhamma (reprised her role from Radhamma Kuthuru)

== Dubbed version ==
Language	Title	Original release	Network(s)	Last aired
Kannada	Agniparikshe ಅಗ್ನಿಪರೀಕ್ಷೆ	31 January 2022	Zee Kannada	20 November 2022
Malayalam	Agnipariksha അഗ്നിപരീക്ഷ	19 September 2022	Zee Keralam	19 November 2022
