= Trial by Fire (Judges Guild) =

Tabletop role-playing game adventure

- Code: Cover
- Authors: Mike Wilson
- First published: 1981

Trial by Fire is an adventure for fantasy role-playing games published by Judges Guild in 1981.

== Plot summary ==
Trial by Fire is an introductory adventure intended for 1st-level player characters, a one-level dungeon located underneath a fortress.

Trial by Fire is an Advanced Dungeons & Dragons introductory scenario in which the adventurers enter an underground land featuring dangerous monsters, with magic and treasure as rewards. Each room includes a description along with game rules related to each situation.

== Publication history ==
Trial by Fire was written by Mike Wilson, and was published by Judges Guild in 1981 as a 32-page book.

TSR chose not to renew its Dungeons & Dragons license with Judges Guild when that license expired in September 1980. Judges Guild was able to keep their Advanced Dungeons & Dragons license for another year, allowing them to publish adventures like The Illhiedrin Book (1981), Zienteck (1981), Trial by Fire (1981), and Portals of Twilight (1981) before ending that line.

== Reception ==
Anders Swenson reviewed House on Hangman's Hill and Trial by Fire for Different Worlds magazine and stated that "The House on Hangman's Hill and Trial by Fire are products which fulfill their basic purpose of being useable adventures for low-level games. However, they suffer from poor development, and the new GM would do well to shun these products in favor of similar, albeit more expensive, adventures from other adventure-gaming houses."

J. David George reviewed the adventure in The Space Gamer No. 49. He called the adventure "classic D&D". George commented that "Perhaps the best part of this adventure is that the more obscure rules and monsters stats for each situation are found with the room descriptions, saving time for the DM. In a few cases where the necessary rules are too long for inclusion, the DM is referred to a page in the appropriate rulebook." He continued: "There are a few omissions of rules and stats, but nothing a competent DM can't deal with. The biggest problem with the adventure is the adventure itself. Used as an introduction, it will give new players the impression that all AD&D consists of gilded holes, full of monsters waiting to be slain and lairs waiting to be looted. The background for the adventure is sketchy; the rationale is weak. Typical of bad D&D, big, predatory monsters live in rooms within a hundred feet of each other and more roam the halls in between." George concluded his review by saying "Trial by Fire would be a fair adventure for the first-time DM, as it allows easy access to the more obscure rules. More experienced players and DMs are likely to be dissatisfied with the weak logic behind the scenario."
