= Mistrial (disambiguation) =

In law, a mistrial occurs when a trial is cancelled without a verdict.

Mistrial may also refer to:

- Mistrial (film), a 1996 American drama written and directed by Heywood Gould
- Mistrial (album), the fourteenth solo album by Lou Reed

== See also ==
- Mistral
