= OpenSkies =

Airline of France (2008–2020)

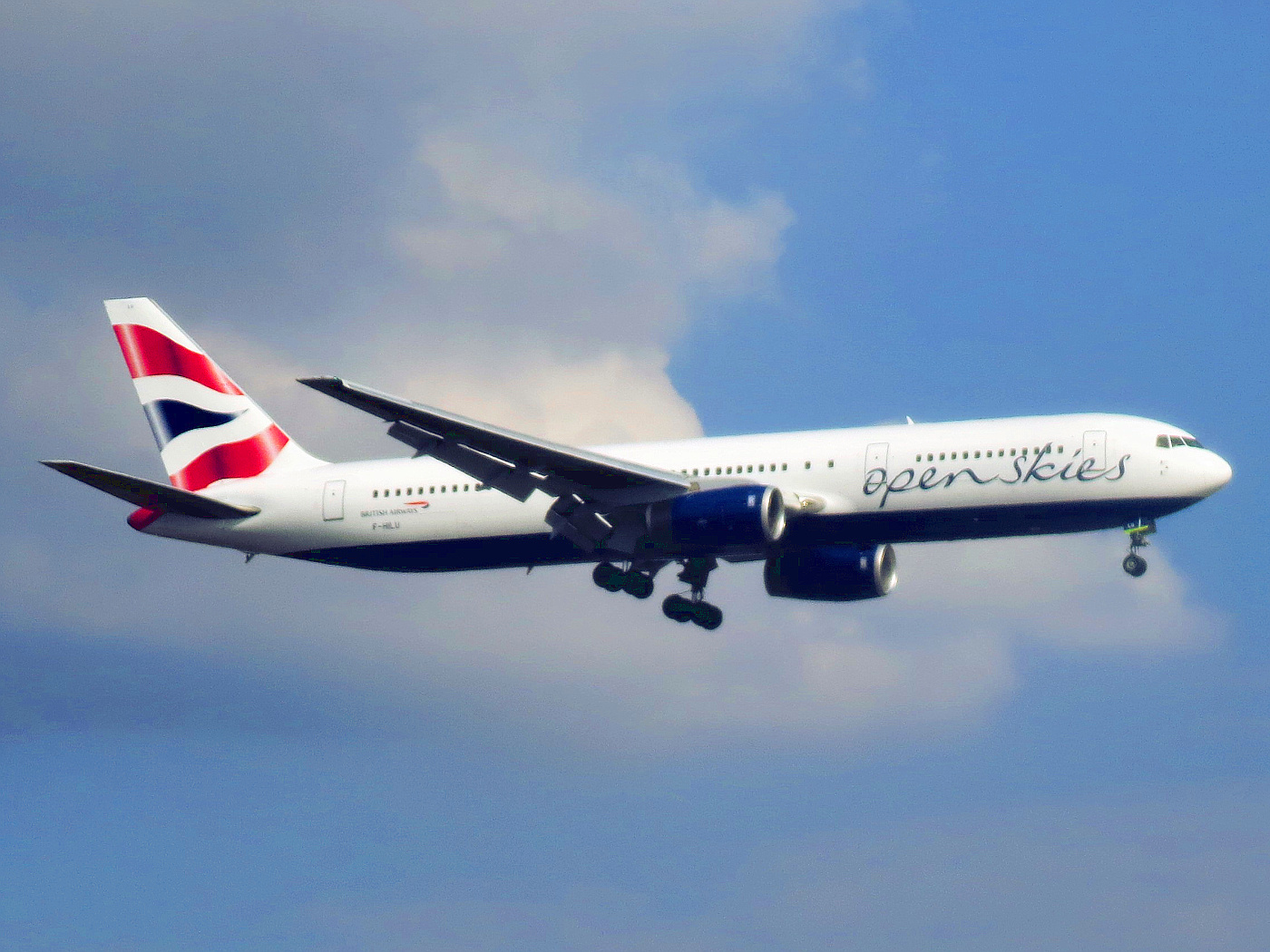
- Boeing 767-300ER
IATA	ICAO	Call sign
LV	BOS	MISTRAL
- Founded: 2008
- Commenced operations: 4 April 2009
- Ceased operations: 8 July 2020
- Operating bases: Orly Airport
- Frequent-flyer program: Avios
- Alliance: Oneworld (affiliate; 2008–2018)
- Fleet size: 3
- Destinations: 5
- Parent company: International Airlines Group
- Headquarters: Rungis, France
- Key people: Patrick Malval CEO

OpenSkies SASU was an airline legally registered in France owned by International Airlines Group (IAG) via British Airways. Its headquarters were located in Rungis, near Paris. The airline launched in June 2008, but in April 2009 the name was transferred to Elysair (which had operated as L'Avion). The airline was a full-service carrier and offered three class cabins, operating between Paris Orly Airport in France and both Newark and New York in the United States. OpenSkies ceased to operate under its own brand after summer 2018 to operate for IAG's new low-cost subsidiary brand Level. The airline closed as a result of the COVID-19 pandemic in 2020.

== History ==
=== Convolute origins ===
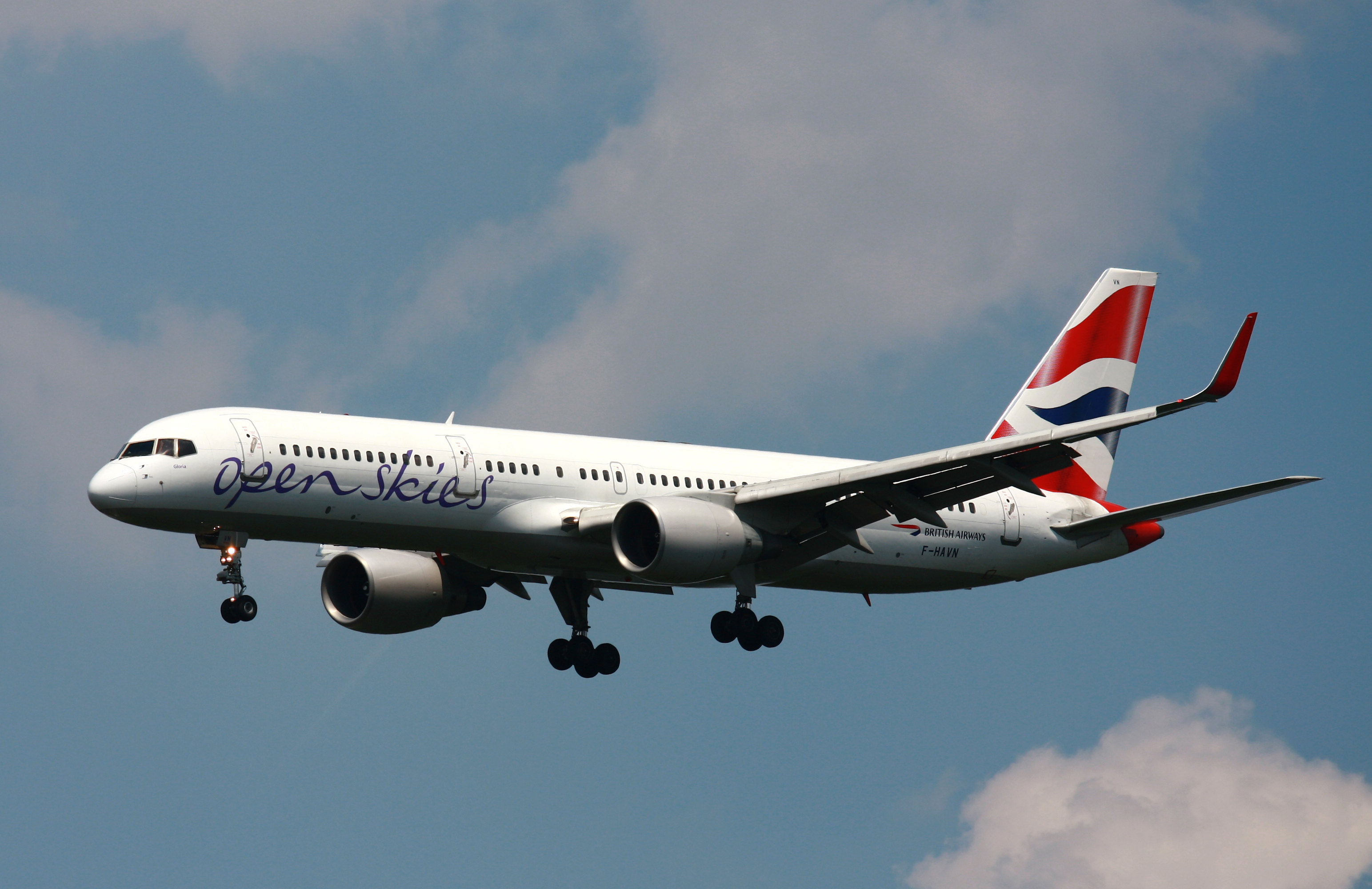
Boeing 757-200

British Airways wanted to reduce its dependence on its Heathrow Airport hub by flying between the United States and cities in continental Europe. The routes that OpenSkies operated were made possible due to the EU-US Open Skies Agreement, which permits any airline based in the United States or the European Union to operate services to and from any EU or American location. The availability of landing slots limits the impact of the agreement at certain airports, such as London Heathrow Airport.

With the creation of an Open Skies agreement between Europe and the United States in March 2008, British Airways started a new subsidiary airline called BA European Limited, trading as Openskies (previously known as "Project Lauren"). which launched originally with a United Kingdom Civil Aviation Authority Type A Operating Licence. This permitted the airline to carry passengers, cargo, and mail on aircraft with 20 or more seats. The operating licence was suspended on 6 May 2009 for three months following the transfer of the name to Elysair, at BA European's request. The CAA certificate eventually was surrendered in favour of operating under a certificate issued by the French Ministère de la Transition écologique et solidaire.

=== OpenSkies takes flight ===
The first flight from New York, was on 19 June 2008, using a single Boeing 757 transferred from the BA fleet. In July 2008 BA bought French airline L'Avion for £54 million. BA European's operations merged with L'Avion on 4 April 2009, forming OpenSkies. In 2008, potential future routes for the airline reportedly included Dublin, Frankfurt, Madrid, Brussels, Rome, and Milan.

The third destination for Openskies was Amsterdam, when flights began on 15 October 2008, and Newark became an additional destination when L'Avion was integrated into OpenSkies on 4 April 2009. On 24 July 2009, the airline announced that the route from New York-JFK to Amsterdam Schiphol would be suspended as of 16 August, for economic reasons. On 30 September the airline announced that the Washington to Paris service would be suspended from 29 October.

In December 2009, the airline announced a change of its New York operations: in January 2010, all OpenSkies flights were shifted from John F. Kennedy International Airport (JFK) to Newark. The airline restored service from JFK to Orly on 31 March 2013. Also in 2013, the airline announced a codesharing agreement with American Airlines.

OpenSkies joined the Oneworld alliance as an affiliate member on 1 December 2012, of which parent British Airways is a founding member. British Airways Executive Club members were then able to claim tier points and BA miles on OpenSkies flights.

=== The pandemic accelerates the crisis ===
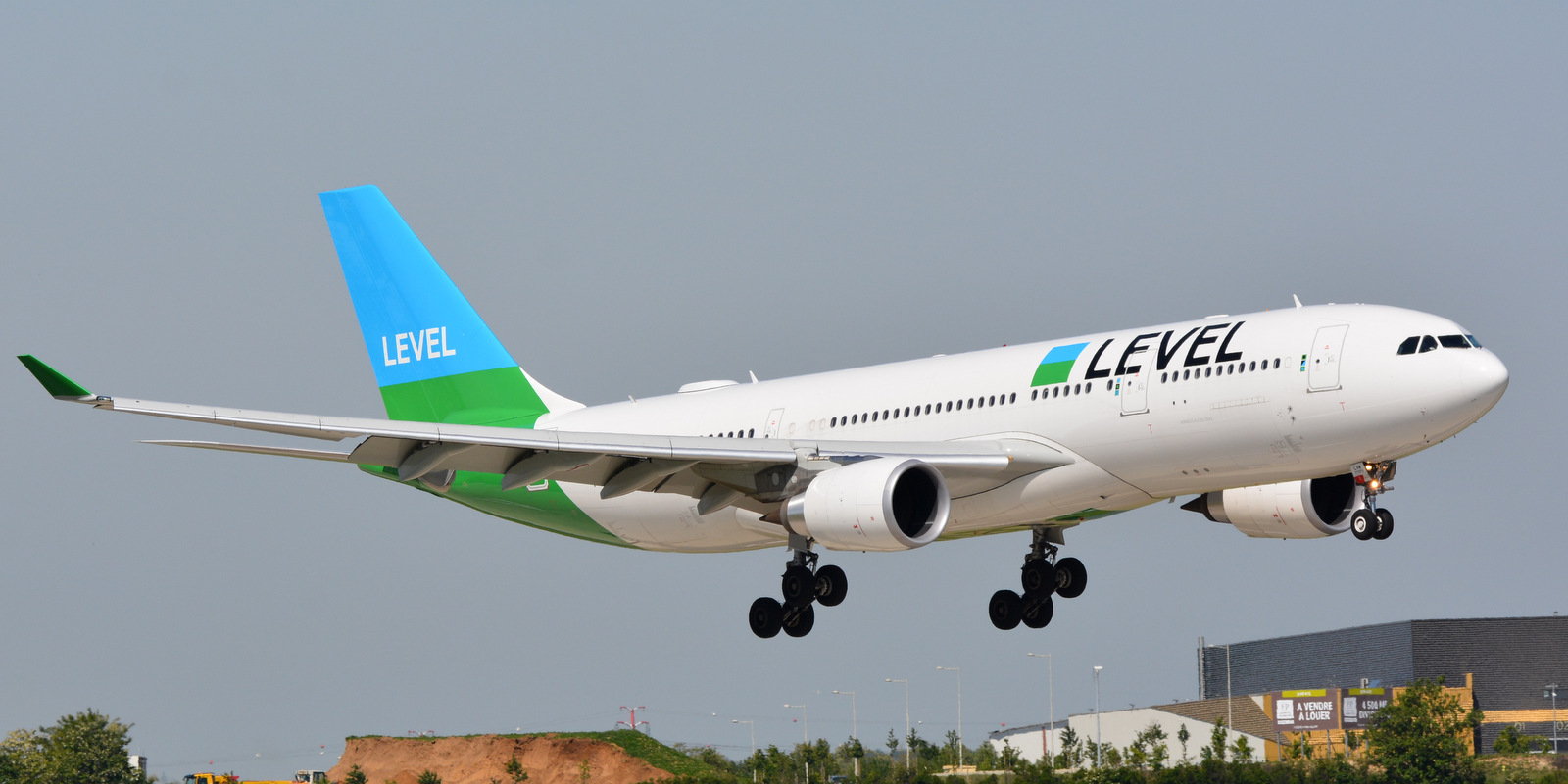
Airbus A330-200 operated for Level

On 28 November 2017, IAG announced that its low-cost airline brand Level would launch flights in July 2018 from Paris Orly Airport, which would be operated by staff that were currently employed by OpenSkies and using the airline's air operator's certificate. In preparation for the change, OpenSkies' IATA code was changed from EC to LV in May 2018. The OpenSkies brand ceased to operate on 2 September 2018, after which all its staff began to operate Level flights. FlightGlobal stated that the retirement of the last OpenSkies branded aircraft "marked the end of the OpenSkies brand, from a public-facing perspective." OpenSkies began operating as Level France, with the same employees since operating under a new brand, with flight crew retrained to fly Airbus aircraft.

On 8 July 2020, IAG reported the shutdown of OpenSkies due to the impact of the COVID-19 pandemic on aviation and passenger demand. Following IAG's announcement however, reservations for flights operated by the airline were reopened at a later date for services resuming in October 2020, later postponed to December 2020, though operations ultimately never resumed and reservations were later closed.

== Destinations ==
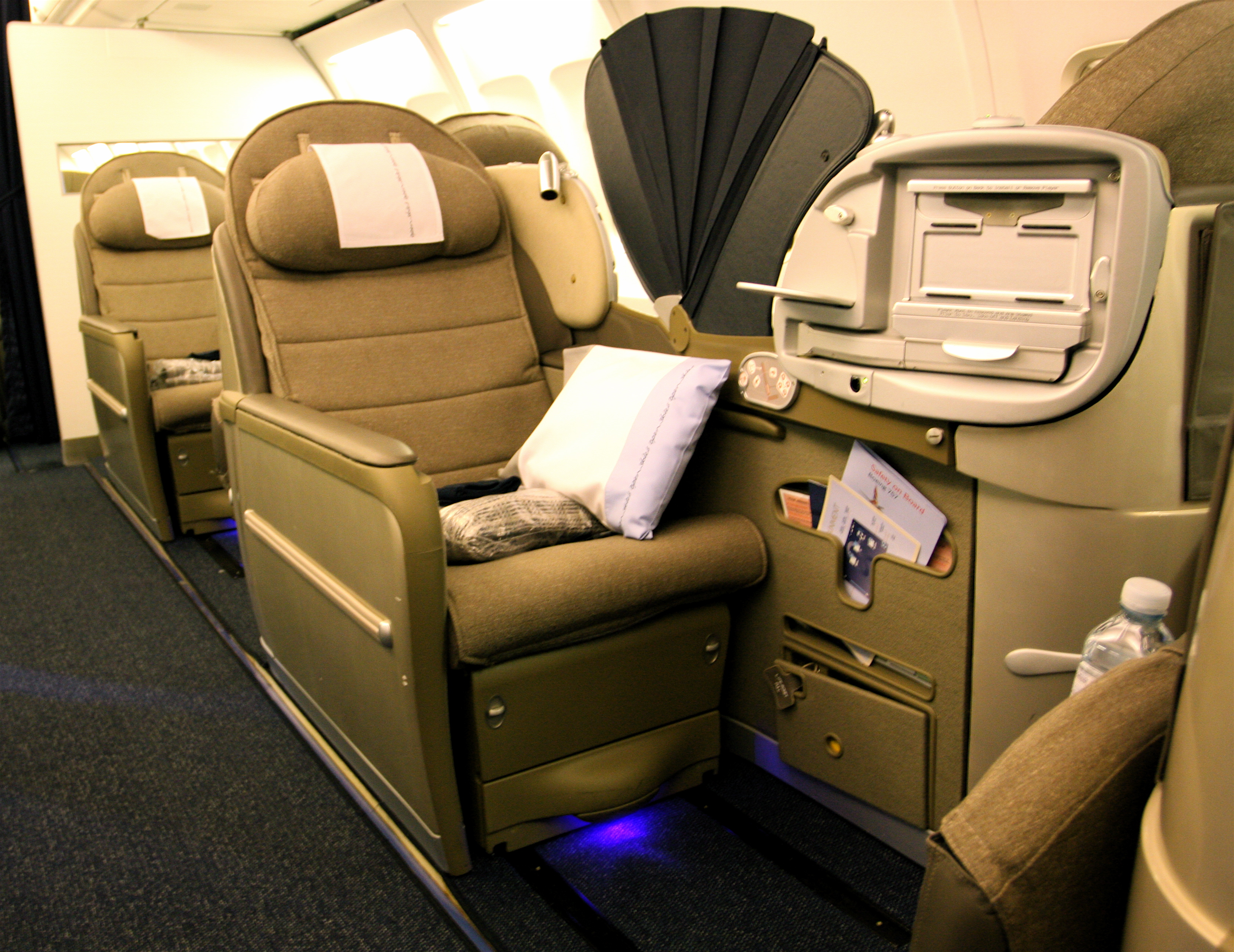
OpenSkies Biz Bed seats

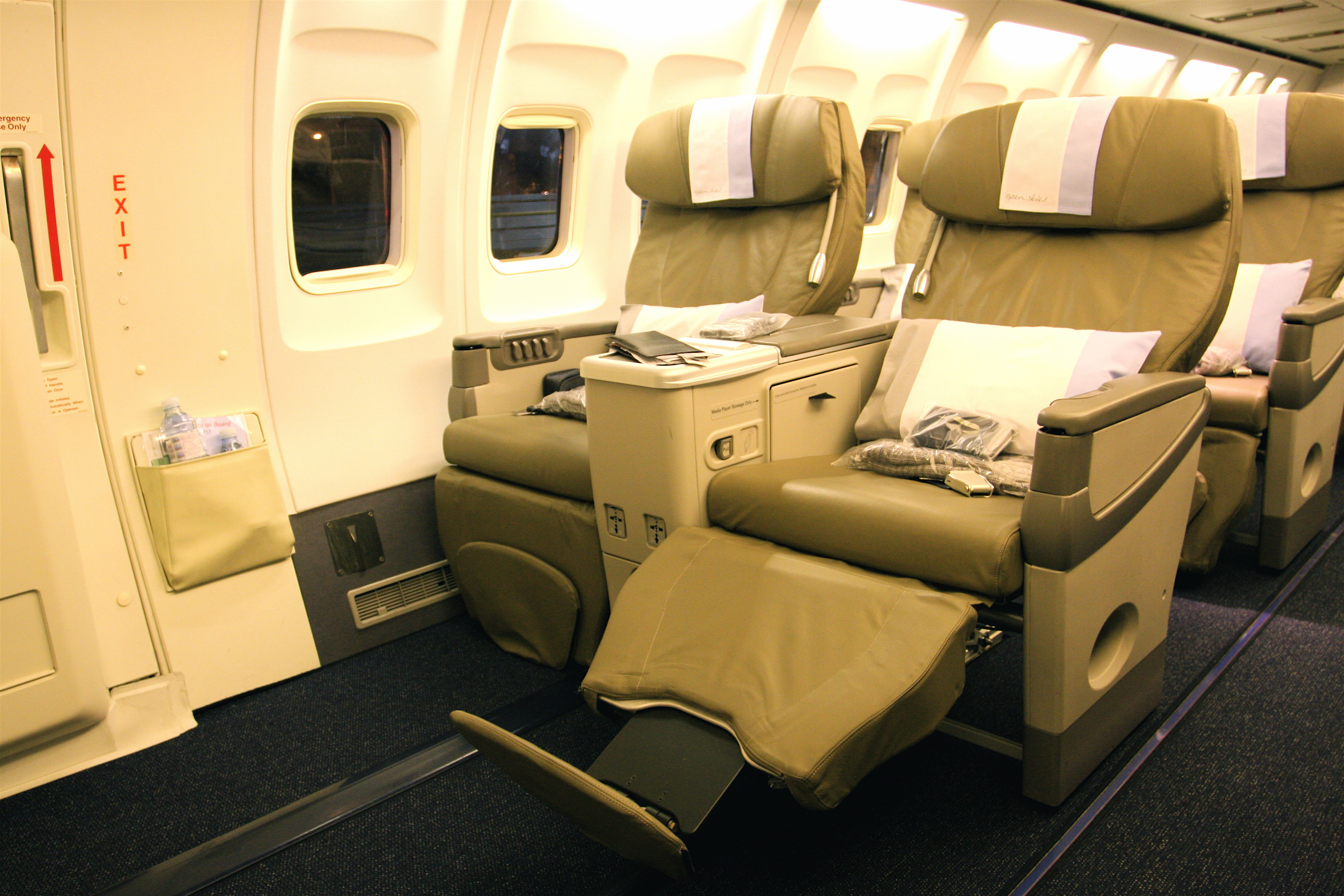
OpenSkies Prem Plus seats

=== Level brand destinations ===
Starting in July 2018, OpenSkies began operating flights to the following destinations on behalf of Level, until the grounding of aircraft and suspension of operations due to the COVID-19 pandemic in March 2020, followed by the airline's closure in July 2020:

Nation or Territory	City	Airport	Remarks	Refs
Canada	Montréal	Montréal–Trudeau International Airport	Seasonal	
France	Paris	Orly Airport	Base	
Guadeloupe	Pointe-à-Pitre	Pointe-à-Pitre International Airport		
Martinique	Fort-de-France	Martinique Aimé Césaire International Airport		
United States	Las Vegas	McCarran International Airport	Terminated	
United States	Newark	Newark Liberty International Airport		

=== Former brand destinations ===
OpenSkies operated scheduled flights to the following destinations under its own name until September 2018:

Nation	City	Airport	Remarks	Refs
France	Paris	Orly Airport	Base	
Netherlands	Amsterdam	Amsterdam Airport Schiphol	Terminated	
United States	New York City	John F. Kennedy International Airport		
United States	Newark	Newark Liberty International Airport		
United States	Washington, D.C.	Washington Dulles International Airport	Terminated	

=== Codeshare agreements ===
OpenSkies had codeshare agreements with the following airlines:

- American Airlines
- British Airways

== Fleet ==
=== Fleet development ===
In February 2009, British Airways announced that it would not transfer additional 757s to its OpenSkies subsidiary by the end of 2009 beyond the one already transferred, as originally planned, but instead would sell them to a third party. OpenSkies was originally to expand to six aircraft by the end of 2009, but BA said this plan had been cancelled.

On 8 April 2016, Openskies announced the addition of a Boeing 767 aircraft in a three-class configuration, transferred from parent British Airways which was retiring its 3-class 767 fleet. The aircraft, which was assigned to the Newark – Paris Orly route on select days, entered service in August 2016. It also provided OpenSkies with a spare aircraft.

In July 2018, the Airbus A330-200 was introduced to the OpenSkies fleet, branded as Level in preparation for the retirement of the OpenSkies brand. At the time of OpenSkies' brand retirement on 2 September 2018, the airline operated one Boeing 757-200 and one Boeing 767-300ER not under the Level brand. Both aircraft were initially ferried to storage and retired on 3 September 2018, while the 757–200 (MSN-25808) was later taken over by Cabo Verde Airlines.

OpenSkies fleet, which was operated under Level brand, consisted of the following aircraft types at the time the airline was shut down in July 2020:

Aircraft type	In service	Orders	Passengers			Remarks
Aircraft type	In service	Orders	W	Y	Total	Remarks
Airbus A330-200	3	—	21	293	314	Operated for Level.
Total	3	—				
