= Baba (name) =

Baba can be a surname in several cultures such as Dravidian, Japanese, Turkics, and Yoruba.

It is also a nickname for 'father' in some languages, and translates to "father" in the Arabic, Persian, Shona and Nguni languages.

In various Slavic languages “baba” means an “old lady” (as in the diminutive variation babushka).

The Japanese surname is pronounced [bä̀.bä́], and it derives from a common noun that is pronounced [bä́.bä̀] and that means "horse-riding ground" or "horse racetrack".

== First name ==
- Baba Abdulai Musah (born 1996), Ghanaian professional footballer
- Baba Adamu Iyam (born 1948), Nigerian soldier who served as Military Administrator of Kwara State
- Baba Miller (born 2004), Spanish professional basketball player
- Baba Adeeko (born 2003), Irish professional footballer
- Baba Balababa oghlu Aliyev (1915–1991), Azerbaijani painter
- Baba Alhassan (born 2000), Ugandan footballer
- Baba Aparajith (born 1994), Indian cricketer
- Baba Ayagiba, Ghanaian politician
- Baba Balia (born 1954), Indian spiritual guru and preacher
- Baba Behbud (1897–1970), officer of the Azerbaijan Democratic Republic and colonel in the Turkish Armed Forces
- Baba Bhaskar, Indian dance choreographer, director and actor
- Baba Brinkman, Canadian rapper
- Baba Buddha (1506–1631), Indian prime figure in early Sikhism
- Baba Collins (born 1988), Nigerian former professional footballer
- Baba Diawara (born 1988), Senegalese former professional footballer
- Baba Diocou (born 2005), Spanish footballer
- Baba Fasiuddin (born 1984), Indian politician
- Baba Fighani Shirazi (also spelled Faghani; died 1519), Persian poet active in the late 15th and early 16th centuries
- Baba Hari Dass (1923–2018), Indian yoga master, silent monk, temple builder, and commentator of Indian scriptural traditions
- Baba Haruna (born 2002), Ghanaian professional footballer
- Baba Kourouma (born 2009), Spanish footballer
- Baba Iddi (born 1982), Ghanaian football striker
- Baba Ishak (died 1241), Seljuk Turkish preacher who led a revolt against the Seljuq Sultanate of Rûm
- Baba Jan (born 1974), Pakistani political activist
- Baba Keenaram, Indian Aghori ascetic
- Baba Gana Kingibe (born 1945), Nigerian diplomat, politician and civil servant
- Baba Malick (born 1983), former Qatari footballer who played as a goalkeeper
- Baba Nobuharu (1514–1575), samurai of Japan's Sengoku period under Takeda Shingen
- Baba Oladotun (born 2008), American basketball player
- Baba Souare (born 1999), Swiss professional footballer
- Baba Rahman (born 1994), Ghanaian footballer
- Baba Samid, a Shia Sufi tariqa that gained a widespread following in medieval Azerbaijan and Turkey
- Baba Sampana (born 1990), Ghanaian professional footballer
- Baba Traoré (born 1992), French professional footballer
- Baba Siddique (1958–2024), Indian politician
- Baba Tahir an 11th-century dervish poet from Hamadan, Iran
- Baba Tatsui (1850–1888), Japanese legislative reformer during the Meiji period
- Baba Vaziroglu (born 1954), Azerbaijani Writers

== Nickname ==
- Abdulla Baba Fatadi (born 1985), former footballer who played as a midfielder. Born as Babatunde Fatai in Lagos, Nigeria, he represented Bahrain at international level
- Afdal al-Din Kashani (Persian: افضل‌الدین مَرَقی کاشانی) also known as “Baba Afzal” (Persian: بابا افضل‌), Persian poet and philosopher
- Aslan Rashidovich Usoyan (Georgian: ასლან რაშიდოვიჩ უსოიანი, Russian: Асла́н Раши́дович Усоя́н; 1937–2013), also known as Baba Gurgur and Grandpa Hassan ("Дед Хасан") or just Grandpa ("Дедушка"), Georgian-born Soviet-Russian crime boss of Yazidi Kurdish descent
- Alaa El Din Abdul Halim El Baba (Arabic: عَلَاء الدِّين عَبْد الْحَلِيم الْبَابَا; born 1993), simply known as Alaa El Baba (Arabic: علاء البابا), a Lebanese footballer
- Akiko Iwata (岩田 暁子, born 1928), also known by nickname “Akiko Baba” (馬場 あき子), Japanese tanka poet and literary critic
- Arteen Ekizian (September 28, 1901 – November 16, 1981), better known by the ring name Ali Baba, was an Armenian American professional wrestler
- Ali Tomorri (1900–1948; also known as Ali Tyrabiu, Ali Turabiu, Ali Baba of Tomorr, Baba Ali of Tomorr, and Varf Ali Prishta) was an Albanian Bektashi religious leader
- Ali Ardekani (Persian: علی اردکانی; born 1974), best known by his stage name “Baba Ali” (Persian: بابا علی), Iranian-born American comedian, games developer, businessman, and actor
- Gaise Baba (born 1986), more commonly known as “Akinade Ibuoye”, Nigerian singer, songwriter, and culture architect
- Aruj Barbarossa (1474–1518), known as Oruç Reis/Baba Aruj (Arabic: عروج بربروس) to the Turks, was an Ottoman corsair who became Sultan of Algiers.
- Barbara "Baba" Lybeck (born 1966), Finnish journalist
- Sayyid Ali Tirmizi (Pashto: سيد علي ترمذي), more commonly known as Pir Baba (پير بابا), an Uzbek Sufi pir who settled in Buner in present-day Khyber Pakhtunkhwa, Pakistan
- John Geesnell Yap (born 1977), popularly known as “Baba Yap”, Filipino politician
- Lady Alexandra Metcalfe (1904–1995), more commonly known as "Baba", British aristocrat
- Baba Yara (real name Osman Seidu), Ghanaian international football player
- Ana di Pištonja, better known as “Baba Anujka” (Serbian Cyrillic: Баба Анујка; 1838–1938), Serbo-Romanian convicted serial killer amateur chemist from the village of Vladimirovac, Serbia
- Müslüm Gürses (1953–2013), born Müslüm Akbaş and called Müslüm Baba, was a popular Turkish arabesque singer and actor
- Baba Punhan, born Atababa Seyidali oghlu Madatzadeh (Azerbaijani: Baba Pünhan), (1948–2004), an Azerbaijani poet
- Baba Adamu (born 1979), known occasionally simply by his nickname “Armando”, Ghanaian former professional football striker
- Dare Fasasi, known professionally as “Baba Dee”, is a Swedish-Nigerian movie director, and dancehall artiste
- Gündüz Kılıç or "Baba" Gündüz Kılıç (1918–1980), Turkish football player and coach
- Emmanuel Baba Dawud (1934–2009), better known as Ammo Baba, an Iraqi football player and coach of the Iraq national football team
- Baroness Marie Liliane Matilda d'Erlanger, later Princess Jean-Louis de Faucigny-Lucinge (1901–1945), nicknamed "Baba", together with Paula Gellibrand, "the Gellibrand", were known as "The Twins" and became Cecil Beaton's models
- Farīd al-Dīn Mas'ūd Ganj-i Shakar (1173–1266), commonly known as “Bābā Farīd” or Shaykh Farīd (also in Anglicised spelling Fareed), a 13th-century Pakistani of Punjabi Muslim preacher, poet and mystic
- Baba Sehgal, known as “Harjeet Singh Sehgal”, (born 1965), Indian rapper
- Edmond Brahimaj (born 1959), commonly known as Baba Mondi, Albanian religious leader and the eighth Bektashi Muslims
- Minamoto no Yorimasa (源 頼政; 1106–1180), known as “Baba no Yorimasa”, Japanese poet, aristocrat and samurai lord
- Neem Karoli Baba (Hindi: नीम करौली बाबा, romanized: nīm karaulī bābā) or Neeb Karori Baba (Hindi: नीब करौरी बाबा, romanized: nīb karaurī bābā) (born Laksman Narayan Sharma; (1900–1973), also known to his followers as Maharaj-ji, an Indian Hindu guru and a devotee of the Hindu deity Hanuman
- Mashrab, also known as “Bābārahim Mashrab” (Боборахим Машраб, Boborahim Mashrab) (1653–1711), a classic figure in Uzbek literature
- Barbara "Baba" Lybeck (born 1966), Finnish journalist
- Baruch Abuhatzeira (Hebrew: ברוך אבוחצירא; born 1941), known as “Baba Baruch”, Moroccan-Israeli Kabbalist rabbi and spiritual
- Barbara Jessica Hardy Beaton (1912–1973), known as “Baba Beaton”, English socialite
- DJ Ozma (born 1979), known as Nao Baba (馬場 直), Japanese pop singer
- Dèhoumon Adjagnon (1925–1985), popularly known by his stage name Baba Yabo, Beninese comedian and actor
- Midori Matsushima (松島 みどり, born 1956), Japanese politician. Her official name is “Midori Baba” (馬場 みどり)
- Nanak Dev (15 April 1469 – 22 September 1539; Gurmukhi: ਗੁਰੂ ਨਾਨਕ; pronunciation: gʊɾuː naːnək), also known as “Baba Nanak”, Indian founder of Sikhism and is the first of the ten Sikh Gurus
- Ghulam Ahmed Chishti (1905–1994), Pakistani music composer. He is also sometimes referred to as “Baba Chishti”
- Tariku Birhanu (Amharic: ታሪኩ ብርሃኑ; (1983–2022), stage name Baba, Ethiopian actor
- Hardev Singh (1954–2016), also known as “Nirankari Baba”, Indian spiritual guru and chief leader of the Sant Nirankari Mission
- Ulubatlı Hasan (Ottoman Turkish: الوباطلى حسن), also known as Baba Hasan Ağa the Standard Bearer (Ottoman Turkish: سنجاقدار بابا حسن آغا) or Baba Hasan-ı ‘Alemî (Ottoman Turkish: بابا حسنِ عَلَمِى) (c. 1390, Ulubat, Karacabey, Bursa – 29 May 1453, Istanbul), was the sekbanbaşı who erected the first standard on the Byzantine walls during the Conquest of Constantinople
- Israel Abuhatzeira (Hebrew: ר׳ יִשְׂרָאֵל אַבּוּחַצִירָא), known as the “Baba Sali” (Arabic: بابا صلى, Hebrew: בַּאבָּא סָאלִי, lit. "Praying Father") (1889–1984), leading Moroccan Sephardic Jews rabbi
- Mokō (もこう, born 1990), known professionally as “Yutaka Baba” (馬場 豊), Japanese internet celebrity
- Riria Baba (馬場 梨里杏, born 1993), known professionally as “Riria” (梨里杏) and “Riria Kojima” (小島 梨里杏), Japanese actress
- Saad El-Haddad (Arabic: سعد الحداد; born 1985), better known by his stage names Baba Saad or just Saad, a German rapper of Lebanese descent
- Sanjay Dutt (born 1959), Indian film actor and producer
- Starina Novak (c. 1530–1601), Serbian hajduk, also known as “Baba Novac” ("Old Novak") in Romanian
- Veersen Aanandrao known as “Baba Kadam”, an Indian novelist famous for his detective novels
- Wakashoyo Shunichi (若翔洋 俊一, born 1966), known as “Yoichi Babaguchi”, Japanese mixed martial artist, kickboxer, professional wrestler and former sumo wrestler
- Baba Vanga (Bulgarian: Баба Ванга, lit. 'Grandmother Vanga'), Bulgarian attributed mystic and healer who claimed to have foreseen the future

== Surname ==
- Adham Baba (Jawi: أدهم بن بابا; born 1962), Malaysian doctor and a politician who served as Minister of Science, Technology and Innovation from 2021 to 2022
- Anas Baba (born 1993/1994), Palestinian photojournalist
- Atsuko Baba (馬場敦子, born 1995), Japanese female handball player for Hokkoku Bank and the Japanese national team
- Corneliu Baba (1906–1997), Romanian painter
- Eiichi Baba (馬場 鍈一, 1879–1937), Japanese bureaucrat and cabinet minister in early Shōwa period
- Frank Shozo Baba (1915–2008), Japanese American who worked for Voice of America and Japan
- Fumika Baba (馬場 ふみか, born 1995), Japanese actress and model
- Devraha Baba, Indian Siddha Yogi saint who lived beside the Yamuna river in Mathura
- Ghafar Baba (1925–2006), Malaysian politician
- Hideo Baba, Japanese video game producer and president of the game development company
- Hussain Ali Baba Mohamed (Arabic: حسين علي بابا; born 1982), former Bahraini footballer
- Ibrahim El-Baba, Lebanese swimmer
- Imad Baba (born 1974), American former professional soccer player
- Iddrisu Baba (born 1996), Ghanaian professional footballer
- James Baba (born 1945), Ugandan politician
- Jaroslav Bába (born 1984), Czech high jumper
- Khalid Baba (born 1996), Bahraini swimmer
- Khaled Mansoor Al Baba, Syrian footballer
- Kenji Baba (born 1985), Japanese footballer
- Kikutaro Baba (1905–2001), Japanese malacologist
- Kosuke Baba (馬場 皐輔, born 1995), Japanese professional baseball pitcher
- Masao Baba (1892–1947), Japanese general
- Mohd Azizan Baba (1981–2022), Malaysian football player and coach
- Naoto Baba (馬場 直人, born 1996), Japanese cross-country skier who competes internationally
- Naruatsu Baba (馬場 功淳, born 1978), Japanese smartphone game developer and businessman
- Noe Baba (born 1996), Cameroonian professional footballer
- Nobuyuki Baba (馬場 伸幸, born 1965), Japanese politician
- Noriko Baba (馬場 典子, born 1977), former Japanese women national football player
- Ryouma Baba (馬場 良馬, born 1984), Japanese actor
- Ryosuke Baba (馬場 亮輔; born 1984), Japanese artistic gymnast
- Saki Baba (馬場咲希, born 2005), Japanese women professional golfer
- Seiya Baba (馬場 晴也; born 2001), Japanese professional footballer
- Shigeru Baba (born 1948), Japanese professional go player
- Shohei Baba (1938–1999), Japanese wrestler
- Seishi Baba (馬場 成志, born 1964), Japanese politician
- Shuhaimi Baba (born 1967), Malaysian film director
- Sumie Baba (born 1967), Japanese voice actress
- Tadao Baba (born 1944), Japanese motorcycle engineer
- Takumi Baba, Japanese professional wrestler
- Toru Baba (born 1988), Japanese entertainer
- Toshifumi Baba (馬場 敏史, born 1965), former Japanese baseball player
- Tupeni Baba, Fijian politician
- Yudai Baba (born 1995), Japanese basketball player
- Yuki Baba (born 1992), Japanese politician
- Yuta Baba (born 1984), Japanese expatriate footballer in South Korea
- Zuhurat Baba, Turkish custodian regarded as a spiritual figure whose tomb is located in Istanbul, Turkey

== Honorific ==
The following have adopted the honorific Baba:

- Aḥmad Bābā al-Timbuktī (Arabic: أحمد بابا التمبكتي), full name Abū al-Abbās Aḥmad ibn Aḥmad ibn Aḥmad ibn Umar ibn Muhammad Aqit al-Takrūrī Al-Massufi al-Timbuktī (1556–1627), Malinese Sanhaja Berber writer, scholar, and political provocateur
- Rachid Baba Ahmed (Arabic: رشيد بابا أحمد) (1946–1945), Algerian record producer, composer, and singer
- Baba Ram Das (1931–2019), born Richard Alpert, American spiritual teacher and psychologist
- Baba Ramdevji (1352–1385), a Hindu ruler venerated as a folk deity in Gujarat and Rajasthan
- Baba Bulleh Shah (1680–1757), a Punjabi philosopher and Sufi poet
- Demir Baba, a 16th-century Alevi saint
- Haji Baba Sheikh (Kurdish: Hacî Baba Şêx – Bukan), Kurdish prime minister of the Republic of Mahabad
- Gül Baba (died 1541), an Ottoman Bektashi dervish poet
- Gurdwara Baba Atal (Punjabi pronunciation: [ɡʊɾᵊd̪ʊäːɾäː bäːbäː əʈʈəɭᵊ]) (died 1628), Indian famous Gurdwara in Amritsar dedicated to Atal Rai, son of Guru Hargobind and Mata Nanaki
- Meher Baba (1894–1969), born Merwan Sheriar Irani, Indian guru
- Otman Baba (c. 1378–1478), a dervish traveling throughout the Ottoman Empire
- Rehman Baba (1632–1706), an Afghan Sufi Dervish and poet
- Sai Baba of Shirdi (c. 1838–1918), Indian guru
- Sathya Sai Baba (1926–2011), born Sathya Narayana Raju, Indian guru purporting to be a reincarnation of Sai Baba of Shirdi
- Sersem Ali Baba, a 16th-century Ottoman dervish
- Yusuf Datti Baba-Ahmed (born 1969), Nigerian economist and politician

== See also ==
- Babá (disambiguation)
