= Baba =

Baba and similar words may refer to:

== Places ==
=== Poland ===
- Baba, Masovian Voivodeship (east-central Poland)
- Baba, Mogilno County in Kuyavian-Pomeranian Voivodeship (north-central Poland)
- Baba, Rypin County in Kuyavian-Pomeranian Voivodeship (north-central Poland)
- Baba, Greater Poland Voivodeship (west-central Poland)

=== Romania ===
- Baba, a village in Horea Commune, Alba County, Romania
- Baba, a village in Coroieni Commune, Maramureș County, Romania
- Baba, a tributary of the river Ghelința in Covasna County, Romania
- Baba, a tributary of the river Putna in Vrancea County, Romania

=== Other countries ===
- Baba (ruins) (Czech: Zřícenina Baba), a 17th-century winepress and an imitation of a castle ruin in Prague in the Czech Republic
- Baba (Serbia) (Баба), a mountain in central Serbia, east of the city of Paraćin
- Baba (North Macedonia) (Баба or Baba Mountain, Баба Планина)
- Baba Station, the former name of Zeze Station, a railway station in Baba, Otsu City, Japan
- Baba mountain range, also known as Koh-i-Baba, in the Hindu Kush of Afghanistan
- Baba Bakala, a historical town and tehsil in the Amritsar district in Punjab, India
- Baba Canton, a canton in Los Ríos Province, Ecuador
- Baba, Iran, a village in Kurdistan Province
- Baba, Kohgiluyeh and Boyer-Ahmad, a village in Kohgiluyeh and Boyer-Ahmad Province, Iran
- Achi Baba, a height dominating the Gallipoli Peninsula in Turkey
- Cape Baba, a cape in Turkey

== People and characters ==
- Ali Baba, a character in Ali Baba and the Forty Thieves

=== Titles and words for people ===
- baba, a familiar term for 'father' in many languages; see Mama and papa
- Baba (honorific), an honorific used in several South Asian and Middle Eastern cultures
- Baba (Alevism), an Alevi religious leader

=== Persons ===
- Baba (name), people with the name
- Babá (disambiguation), people with the name
- Gül Baba (disambiguation), people with the name
- Yutaka Baba (disambiguation), Japanese people with the name
- Baba Yaga (disambiguation), people with the name
- Baba clan, a Japanese samurai family that was associated with Kai Province
- Baba, Indonesian politician
- Baba Daud Al-Jawiy, Indonesian great scholar from Sultanate of Aceh
- Baba Rexheb (1901–1995), an Albanian Muslim scholar and Sufi
- Ramdev Baba (born 1965), Indian yoga teacher
- Sayaka Baba, a Japanese singer and actress, former member of HKT48
- Sai Baba, Indian mystic (1838–1918)
- Baba Farid, Punjabi Muslim preacher and mystic (1188 – 1266)
- Baba Hari Dass, Indian yogi and writer (1923–2018)

=== Folklore ===
- Baba (goddess) or Bau, a Sumerian goddess from Lagash
- Baba (Egyptian god) or Babi, an Egyptian god in the shape of a baboon

=== Fictional characters ===
- Baba (The Kite Runner), a character in The Kite Runner media
- Baba (Dragon Ball), a character in Dragon Ball media
- Baba, a character Indonesian drama series in Aladin & Alakadam
- Baba, a character in Redbeard comics
- Baba, a character in Puffin Rock
- Baba, the player character in Baba Is You
- Baba (オババ), a character Japanese animation in Bastard!!

== Arts and entertainment ==
=== Films ===
- Baba (2000 film), a Chinese film
- Baba (2002 film), an Indian Tamil-language film starring Rajinikanth
- Bába (2008 film), a Czech short film
- Baba (2012 film), an Egyptian film

=== Music ===
- "Baba", a song from Supposed Former Infatuation Junkie by Alanis Morissette
- "Baba", a song from the 2001 self-titled Kelly Key album
- "Baba", a single from the 2025 album Ebtadena by Amr Diab

== Food ==
- Baba (cake) or Babka, a Polish yeast cake
- Rum baba, a small yeast cake saturated in syrup made with hard liquor, usually rum
- Baba (bread), a type of bread made by the Naxi people of Yunnan, China

== Other uses ==
- Paopi or Baba, the second month of the Coptic calendar
- Kurgan stelae, anthropomorphic stone stella commonly known as baba in the East Ukraine
- Baba (yacht), a line of yachts built in Taiwan
- Baba (Pillow Pal), a Pillow Pal lamb made by Ty, Inc.
- beta-Aminobutyric acid (BABA), an isomer of Aminobutyric acid
- Trosky Castle, One of the two towers on the famous Gothic castle ruins in the Bohemian Paradise is named Baba (while the taller one is Panna)
- Alibaba Group Holding Limited (New York Stock Exchange stock symbol BABA)

== See also ==
- Ali Baba (disambiguation)
- BA (disambiguation)
- BA2 (disambiguation)
- Babaji (disambiguation)
- Bhabha (disambiguation)
- Babai (disambiguation)
- Babar (disambiguation)
- Babu (disambiguation)
- Babo (disambiguation)
- Babul (disambiguation)
- Baba Ahmad (disambiguation)
- Baba Mountain (disambiguation)
- Baba Nation, a Norwegian soul/funk band
- Baba Vanga (1911–1996), a Bulgarian mystic known as Grandmother (Baba) Vanga
- Baba Zula (also stylized as BaBa ZuLa), a Turkish alternative musical group
- Standing Baba, a Hindu who has vowed to stand
- Baba ghanoush, a Middle Eastern eggplant dish
- Rum baba, a cake saturated in rum
- Godman (India)
- Peranakan, an ethnic group in Southeast Asia also known as Baba-Nyonya
- Baba is You, a puzzle game released in 2019
