= Babu (name) =

Babu is a common given name in India, also found in other cultures.

== Notable people with this name ==
=== Given name ===
- Babu (actor) (d. 2023), Indian actor
- Babu Antony, Indian film actor in Malayalam movies
- Babu Janardhanan, Indian film director in Malayalam movies
- Babu Ram Mandial, Indian politician
- Babu Mohan, Indian film comedian
- Babu Namboothiri, Indian film actor in Malayalam movies
- Babu Narayanan, Indian film director in Malayalam movies
- Babu Himmat Sah, Founder ruler of Kohra (estate)
- Babu Amar Singh, brother of Kunwar Singh, the ruler of Jagdishpur estate, rebel leader in the Indian rebellion of 1857 against British rule
- Babu Bhoop Singh, Ruler of Kohra (estate) and Leader of Indian Rebellion of 1857
- Babu Kunwar Singh, Ruler of Jagdishpur estate, rebel leader in the Indian rebellion of 1857 against British rule

=== Surname ===
- B. Santosh Babu, Indian Army officer
- D. Babu Paul (1941–2019), former member of the Indian Administrative Service
- D. Suresh Babu, Indian film producer
- Fazlur Rahman Babu, Bangladeshi actor
- Idavela Babu, Indian film actor in Malayalam movies
- Jagapati Babu, Indian film actor
- Mahesh Babu, Indian actor
- Nagendra Babu, Indian film actor and producer
- Prasad Babu, South Indian film actor, who acted in Telugu and Tamil films
- V. S. Babu (1951–2026), Indian politician
- Yogi Babu (born 1985), Indian actor and comedian

=== As a nickname ===
- Anderson Rodney de Oliveira (born 1980), known as 'Babù', Brazilian footballer
- Babu Bajrangi, a criminal from India, responsible for the deaths of many people in 2002
- Babu Santana (born 1979), Brazilian actor and singer
- Babullah of Ternate, called name “Sultan Babullah” (1528–1583), also known as “Babu”, an Indonesian heroes, and 7th Sultan and 24th ruler of the Sultanate of Ternate in Maluku
- DJ Babu (born 1974), Filipino-American DJ and member of Dilated Peoples
- Giri Babu (1943–2026), Indian actor, producer and director
- Jorge Babu (1965–2026), Brazilian politician
- K. D. Singh (field hockey) (1922–1978), Indian hockey player nicknamed 'Babu'
- N. Chandrababu Naidu (born 1950), often referred to as 'Babu', Indian politician
- Pablo Márquez (wrestler) (born 1973), Ecuadorian wrestler with the ring name 'Babu'

== Fictional characters ==
- Babu Bhatt, Pakistani character on the sitcom Seinfeld
- Babu, character in Jeannie (TV series)
- Baby Babu, fake baby monkey adopted by "The Creatures, LLC"
- Babu, a fake Austrian people who is the last year champion of the tournament in the 1994 arcade game Stack Columns
- Babu Rao Ganpat Rao Apte, a character in Hera Pheri (film series) played by Paresh Rawal
- Hurree Chunder Mookerjee, character in the Rudyard Kipling novel Kim, mostly referred to as "Hurree Babu" or "the Babu"

== See also ==
- Babu (title)
- Babu (disambiguation)
