= Babai (surname) =

Babai is a surname. Notable people with the surname include:

- Béla Babai (1914–1997), Romani musician and interpreter
- László Babai (born 1950), Hungarian mathematician

== See also ==
- Babai (disambiguation)
- Baba (disambiguation)
