= Homi Bhabha =

Homi Bhabha may refer to:

- Homi J. Bhabha (1909–1966), Indian nuclear physicist
- Homi K. Bhabha (born 1949), Indian-American postcolonial theorist and professor of English

== See also ==
- Bhabha (disambiguation)
- Bhabha (surname)
