= Omkar Nath Sharma =

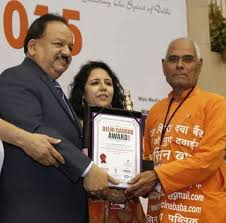
Medicine Baba - Gaurav Ratna Award

Omkar Nath Sharma born in U.P India (around 1940) also known as the "Medicine Baba" (Medicine Monk). is a retired blood bank technician from Kailash Hospital in Greater Noida, Uttar Pradesh, India, who voluntarily collects unused medicines from people and distributes them to the poor free of charge. Omkar started collecting medicine after realising the acute medicine shortage, when he witnessed an accident which took place in East Delhi 2008 the under-constructed metro bridge collapsed, killing the lives of two labourers and injuring many others. The local hospital administered basic first aid but nothing else. The injured returned home to die being unable to afford the cost of treatment. That incident shook Omkar and he became determined to not let something like this happen again.

Crippled at the age of 12 in a car accident, Omkar walks five or six kilometres per day. At the end of every collection, Omkar carefully catalogues everything in his binder: the name of the drug, the manufacturer, where he collected it and the expiry date. Omkar makes no profit from these.

Omkar lives with his wife and a 45-year-old mentally challenged son.

== Awards ==
- 2016 Delhi Gaurav Award
- 2017 Shoorveer Award - Mumbai
