= Babul =

Babul may refer to:

- Babul, Iran, a city in Mazandaran Province, Iran
- Babul (tree) (Acacia nilotica), the gum arabic tree, an acacia native to India, Pakistan, and Africa
- Babul (Hindi word) (or Baabul), an archaic Hindi word for father used in songs
- "Babul", a song by Raamlaxman and Sharda Sinha from the 1994 Indian film Hum Aapke Hain Koun..!
- Babul (1950 film), a 1950 Hindi film starring Dilip Kumar and Nargis
- Baabul (2006 film), a 2006 Hindi film starring Amitabh Bachchan, Hema Malini and Salman Khan

== People ==
- Babul Datta (born 1956), Indian cricketer
- Babul Supriyo (born 1970), Indian playback singer, actor, and politician
- Mike Babul (1977–2024), American basketball coach
- Nurul Islam Babul (1946–2020), Bangladeshi businessman

== See also ==
- Babu (disambiguation)
- Baba (disambiguation)
- Babo (disambiguation)
- Babool (brand)
