= Babu =

Babu may refer to:

== People ==
- Babu (name), list of people with this name
- Babù (born 1980), Anderson Rodney de Oliveira, Brazilian footballer
- Babu (wrestling), ring name of Pablo Marquez, Ecuadorian wrestler
- DJ Babu (born 1974), Filipino-American DJ and member of Dilated Peoples
- K. D. Singh (field hockey) (1922–1978), Indian field hockey player, nicknamed Babu

== Films ==
- Babu (1971 film), a Tamil film starring Sivaji Ganesan
- Babu (1975 film), a Telugu film starring Shobhan Babu
- Babu (1985 film), a Hindi film starring Rajesh Khanna
- Babu (2001 film), an Urdu film starring Zeba Bakhtiar

== Other uses ==
- Babu (title), a princely title used by many rulers in India
- Babu District, Hezhou, Guangxi, China
- Bau (goddess), also romanized as Babu
- Babu (red panda), which disappeared from a nature centre in Birmingham, England in 2005

== See also ==
- Baba (disambiguation)
- Babul (disambiguation)
- Babo (disambiguation)
- Babuji (disambiguation)
