= Otto of Wittelsbach =

Otto of Wittelsbach may refer to:

== People ==
- Otto IV, Count of Wittelsbach (c. 1083 – 1156), father of Otto I of Wittelsbach, Duke of Bavaria
- Otto I Wittelsbach, Duke of Bavaria (1117–1183)
- Otto VIII, Count Palatine of Bavaria, killed in 1209, son of Count Otto VII of Wittelsbach and murderer of King Philip
- Otto II Wittelsbach, Duke of Bavaria (1206–1253), Duke of Bavaria and Count Palatine of the Rhine
- Otto III, Duke of Bavaria (1261–1312)
- Otto IV, Duke of Lower Bavaria (1307–1334)
- Otto V, Duke of Bavaria (1346–1379), also Margrave of Brandenburg as Otto VII
- King Otto of Greece (1815–1867), of the House of Wittelsbach
- Otto, King of Bavaria (1848–1916)

== Other ==
- Otto von Wittelsbach (play), by German playwright Joseph Marius Babo (1756–1822)
