= Babo =

Babo may refer to:

== People ==
- Babo (rapper), rapper, founder and member of Cartel de Santa
- Babo, a nickname for Fikret Abdić (born 1939), Bosnian politician
- Alberto Babo (born 1947), head coach of Porto Ferpinta, Portugal
- Joseph Marius Babo (1756–1822), German dramatist
- Lambert Heinrich von Babo (1818–1899), German chemist

== Other ==
- Babo Airport West Papua, Indonesia
- Babo, unfilmed 1969 film script by Pablo Neruda based on Babo, Senegalese servant in the short novel Benito Cereno
- BA:BO, a 2008 South Korean film
- Babo (2019 film), an Indian Marathi-language film
- Babo, an Uglydolls character
- Babo 73, 1964 film by Robert Downey Sr.

== See also ==
- Babu (disambiguation)
- Baba (disambiguation)
- Babul (disambiguation)
- Babos, a Hungarian surname
