= Naparay =

Naparay, in African anthropological study, is non-linear conception of human life held by some West African peoples such as the Yoruba. Similar to reincarnation, naparay holds that lives are cyclic and that attributes of previous lives may carry over to a new life.

Its followers may invoke ritual practices to determine if a young child is in fact an "elder" - including rituals undertaken while the future mother is pregnant. In naparay, all people are considered to have had previous lives. However, the extent to which they carry their past lives with them into the present is determined by these ritual practices. A newborn with the capability, or "life force", of an elder may be deferred to as an elder, for example being called "Baba" (father, elder) and be trained to lead ceremonies at a young age. Naparay is seen as the method by which ancient knowledge is passed on to present society. Rituals and prayer are performed during early pregnancy to guide the vital force of the recently deceased toward the new child.

Western anthropologists believe than naparay limits the accumulation of power among a small group within a community. Attributing wisdom and experience to the young allows new and competing leaders to emerge. Anthropologists also note that nothing in the mythology of naparay prevents females from being considered to possess a strong "life force" in equality with males, yet the culture almost always attributes strong naparay to males only.
