= Ali Baba and the Forty Thieves (disambiguation) =

Ali Baba and the Forty Thieves is a folk tale about Ali Baba, a character from Arabian literature.

Ali Baba and the Forty Thieves and variants may also refer to:

== Films ==
- Ali Baba and the Forty Thieves (1902 film), a 1902 French film directed by Ferdinand Zecca
- Ali Baba and the Forty Thieves (1918 film), a 1918 American film directed by Chester Franklin and Sidney Franklin
- Ali Baba and the Forty Thieves (1944 film), a 1944 adventure film directed by Arthur Lubin
- Ali Baba and the Forty Thieves (1954 film), a 1954 French film directed by Jacques Becker
- Alibaba and 40 Thieves (1954 film), a 1954 Indian Hindi-language film directed by Homi Wadia
- Alibaba and 40 Thieves (1966 film), a 1966 Indian Hindi-language film directed by Homi Wadia
- Ali Baba 40 Dongalu (Alibaba and the 40 Thieves), a 1970 Indian Telugu-language film directed by B. Vittalacharya
- Ali Baba and the Forty Thieves (1971 film), a 1971 Japanese film directed by Hiroshi Shidara
- Alibabayum 41 Kallanmaarum (Alibaba and the 41 Thieves), a 1975 Indian Malayalam-language film directed by J. Sasikumar
- Alibaba (2002 film), a 2002 Indian animated film by Usha Ganesarajah, also released as Alibaba & the Forty Thieves
- Alibaba and The Forty Thieves, a 2018 Indian 3D-animated film adaptation by V. Murugan
- Alibaba Aani Chalishitale Chor (Alibaba and the Forty Thieves), a 2024 Indian Marathi-language film by Aditya Ingale

== Video games ==
- Ali Baba and 40 Thieves (video game), a 1982 maze arcade game released by Sega
- Ali Baba and the Forty Thieves (video game), a 1981 computer role-playing game for the Atari 8-bit and Apple II family computers
- Ali Baba and the Forty Thieves of Bagdad, a 1995 Iranian computer game.

== Other uses ==
- Ali Baba and the Forty Thieves (album), Bing Crosby album

== See also ==
- Ali Baba (disambiguation)
- Alibaba Aur 40 Chor (disambiguation), Indian film adaptations in Hindi
- Alibabavum 40 Thirudargalum (disambiguation), Indian film adaptations in Tamil
