= Ali Baba (disambiguation) =

Ali Baba is a character from the folk tale "Ali Baba and the Forty Thieves".

Alibaba Group is a Chinese multinational internet technology company.

Ali Baba or Alibaba may also refer to:

== Arts and entertainment ==
=== Films ===
- Ali Baba and the Forty Thieves (1902 film), a French film directed by Ferdinand Zecca
- Ali Baba and the Seven Dwarfs, a 2015 Turkish comedy action film
- Ali Baba (1940 film), an Indian fantasy film directed by Mehboob Khan
- Alì Babà, a 1970 Italian animated film directed by Giulio Gianini and Emanuele Luzzati
- Ali Baba (1973 film), an Indian animated film directed by Rohit Mohra
- Ali Baba (1974 film), an Indonesian film
- Ali Baba, a 1991 Australian animated television film produced by Burbank Animation Studios
- Alì Babà, a 1996 Italian animated film directed by Zlata Potancokova Belli
- Alibaba, a 2002 Indian 3-D animated adventure feature film by Usha Ganesarajah
- Alibhabha, a 2008 Indian Tamil-language film by Neelan K. Sekar

=== Opera ===
- Ali Baba (Cherubini), 1833 opera by Luigi Cherubini
- Alì Babà, an 1871 opera by Giovanni Bottesini
- Ali-Baba (Lecocq), 1887 opera by Charles Lecocq

=== Other entertainment ===
- Ali Baba (TV series) or Ali Baba: Dastaan-E-Kabul, a 2022 Indian television series
- Alibaba Saluja, the main character from the manga/anime Magi: The Labyrinth of Magic loosely based on the original character
- "Ali Baba Ali Baba", a song by Aadesh Shrivastava and Runa Laila from the 1990 Indian film Agneepath

== People ==
- Alibaba Akpobome, Nigerian comedian, stage name Ali Baba
- Nicolae Constantin Batzaria or Ali Baba (1874–1952), Aromanian writer
- Mircea Demetriade or Ali-Baba (1861–1914), Romanian writer
- Ali Baba Taj (born 1977), Pakistani poet in Urdu
- Ali Baba (writer) (1940–2016), Sindhi writer from Pakistan
- Ali Baba (wrestler) (1901–1981), Armenian American professional wrestler

== Other uses ==
- Ali Baba (business practice), a business practice in Malaysia and Indonesia to take advantage of affirmative action provisions
- Ali Baba (crater), a crater on Saturn's moon Enceladus
- Ali Baba (ride), a type of gondola ride
- Ali Baba, an ethnic slur for an Iraqi

== See also ==
- "The Adventurous Exploit of the Cave of Ali Baba", a short story by Dorothy L. Sayers, collected in Lord Peter Views the Body
- Ali Baba and the Forty Thieves (disambiguation)
- Alibaba Aur 40 Chor (disambiguation)
- Ali Babacan (born 1967), Turkish politician
