= Babi =

Babi or BABI may refer to:

- Babi Yar (book), a 1966 book by Anatoly Kuznetsov
- Babi (mythology), a baboon god in Egyptian mythology
- Babi Yar (poem), poems about Babi Yar
- Babi (title), various Indian titles
- Babi dynasty, a Muslim dynasty in British India
- Babi Island (disambiguation), several islands of this name in south east Asia
- Babı, a village and municipality in Azerbaijan
- Bábí, a follower of Bábism
- FK Babi, a football club in the Republic of Macedonia
- BABI, a 2020 movie by Malaysian director Namewee
- The Indonesian and Malay word for pig
- A French nickname for Abidjan, the largest city in the Ivory Coast

== People ==
- Matheus Babi (born 1997), Brazilian footballer
- Parveen Babi (1954–2005), Indian actress
- Babi Badalov (born 1959), Azerbaijani visual artist and poet
- Babi Dewet (born 1986), Brazilian novelist
- Babi Rossi (born 1990), Brazilian model and TV presenter
- Babi Slymm, ring name of Tony Drake (born 1978), American professional wrestler
- Babi Xavier (born 1974), Brazilian actress, model and TV hostess

== See also ==
- Babi Island (disambiguation)
- Babis (disambiguation)
- Babai (disambiguation)
