= Babá =

Babá may refer to:

- Babá (footballer, born 1934) (1934–2010), Brazilian footballer Mario Braga Gadelha
- Babá (footballer, born 1938) (1938–2000), Brazilian footballer Santino Quarth Irmão
- Babá (footballer, born 1944), Brazilian footballer Roberto Caveanha

== See also ==
- Baba (disambiguation)
- Baba (name)
