= Bhabha =

Bhabha may refer to:

- Homi Jehangir Bhabha, Indian physicist (1909–1966)
- Bhabha (surname)
- Bhabha (crater), on the Moon
- Bhabha scattering, in quantum electrodynamics
- Bhabha Atomic Research Centre

== See also ==
- Homi Bhabha National Institute, an Indian deemed university
- Homi Bhabha Centre for Science Education, Mumbai, India
- Jamshed Bhabha Theater (NCPA), Mumbai, India
- Baba (disambiguation)
