= Babaji =

Babaji is an Indian honorific that means "Father", usually with great respect or to a Priest. It may also refer to:

People

- Baba Ji Maharaj, name is used for Baba Jaimal Singh (born July 1878), Founder and first Satguru of Radha Soami Satsang Beas.
- Babaji, name is used for Sardar Gurinder Singh Dhillon Ji (born 1 August 1954), spiritual teacher
- Babaji, affectionate name for Shivarudra Balayogi (born 1954), yogi and self realized master
- Babaji, a name for Baba Virsa Singh Ji, founder of the Gobind Sadan Institute
- Babaji Maharaji or Hariakhan Baba (active 1861–1924), a yogi who taught throughout northern India near the Himalayas
- Gaurakisora Dasa Babaji (1838–1915), a well-known acharya from the Gaudiya Vaishnava tradition of Hinduism
- Haidakhan Babaji, a teacher who appeared in northern India and taught publicly from 1970–1984
- Mahavatar Babaji, a legendary immortal yogi
- Azam Cheema (1953–2024), also known as Baba or Babaji, Pakistani Lashkar-e-Taiba militant

Other uses

- "Babaji", a song from the album Even in the Quietest Moments... by Supertramp
- Babaji, Helmand, a rural suburb of Lashkargah that was the center of Operation Panther's Claw in 2009 during the War in Afghanistan
- Little Babaji, a reworking of the children's book The Story of Little Black Sambo

== See also ==
- Babuji (disambiguation)
- Baba (disambiguation)
