= Babai =

Babai may refer to:

== Patriarchs of the Church of the East ==
- Babowai (fl. 457–484), executed for anti-Sasanian statements
- Babai of Seleucia-Ctesiphon (fl. 497–503), Patriarch of the Church of the East (the Persian Church), from 497 to 503
- Babai the Great (551–628), an early church father of the Church of the East

== Other uses ==
- Babai (Pashtun tribe), a Pashtun tribe in the Pakistan, Afghanistan and India
- Babai (surname)
- Babai (film), a 2015 Kosovan film
- The Eight Hundred (八佰, Bābǎi), 2020 Chinese film
- Babai, Iran, a village in Fars Province, Iran
- Babai, Kohgiluyeh and Boyer-Ahmad, a village in Kohgiluyeh and Boyer-Ahmad Province, Iran
- Babai Hotel, 1992 Telugu film
- Babai River, river in Nepal's Dang, Salyan and Bardiya districts and India's Uttar Pradesh state, then joining the Ghaghara
- Babai Revolt, a revolt in the 13th century Turkey
- Babai (Swamp Taro), a root crop cultivated in Kiribati
- Babai Rural Municipality, a rural council in Nepal

== See also ==
- Baba (disambiguation)
- Babi (disambiguation)
