= Baba Vaziroglu =

Baba Firqanoglu
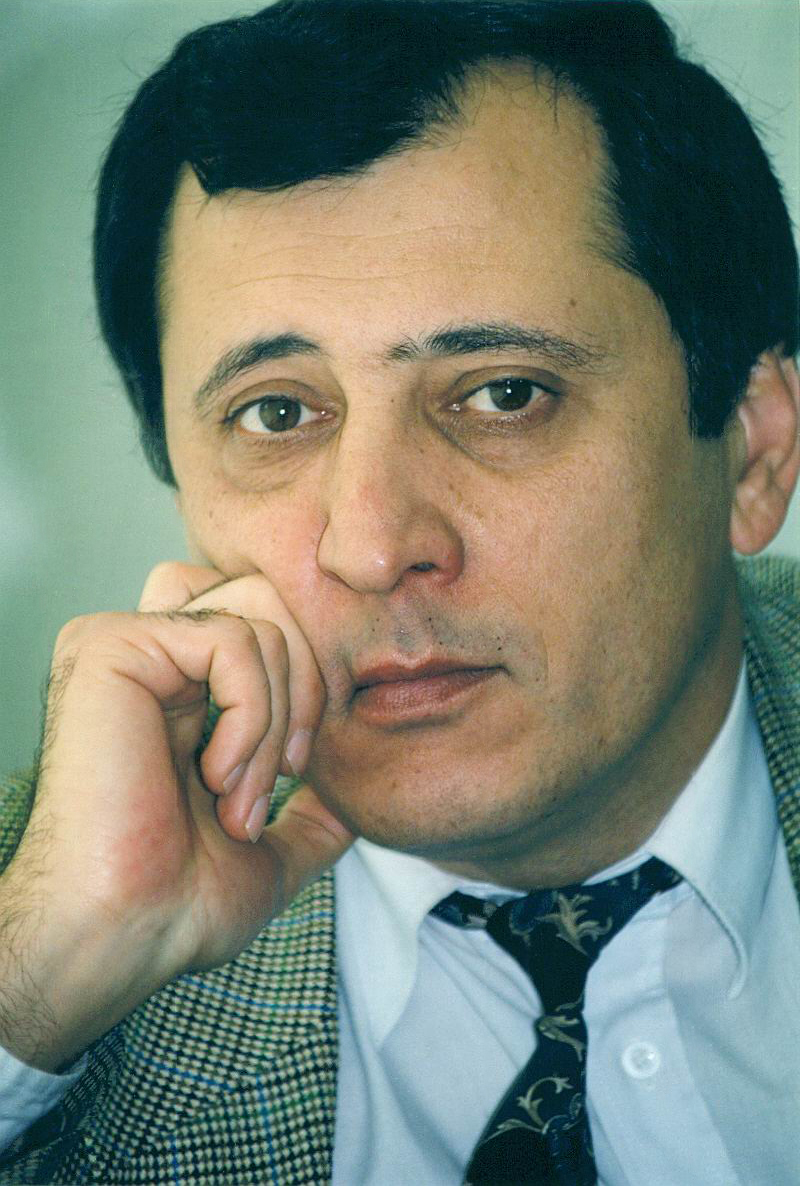
- Baba Vaziroglu-Azerbaijani poet
- Born: Məsimov Baba Vəzir oğlu January 10, 1954 (age 72); Mollaisaqli, Ismayilli
- Occupations: prosaist, poet, translator
- Children: 2
- Writing career
- Language: Azerbaijani

Baba Vaziroglu (full name: Məsimov Baba Vəzir oğlu, born January 10, 1954) is a prosaist, poet, translator, member of Union of Azerbaijani Writers since 1981, laureate of Republic Komsomol award, and an Honoured Art Figure of Azerbaijan Republic since 1 August 2005.

== Early life ==
Baba Vaziroglu was born on January 10, 1954, in Mollaisaqli, Ismayilli. After finishing education at a village secondary school, he worked in “Pravda” collective-farm, and from there he was sent to the training faculty of Azerbaijan University of Languages. He studied journalism faculty of this university. He worked as a literary figure in Azerbaijan LKGİ MK RTİD headquarter, as an instructor in fiction popularization bureau of Azerbaijan Writers Union, and as an adviser in Azerbaijani Writers. He had been editor-in-chief of “Molla Nasraddin” magazine. He was elected as a member of Managerial Staff of Union of Azerbaijani Writers.

== Career ==
He began his literary activity with "Bir yaz axşamı" (A spring evening), "Mağazinçi Dadaş" (Shopkeeper Dadash) stories which were published in “Ulduz” magazine. Since then he was continuing to appear in periodical press with his poems and prose works. He translated works of Russian poets into Azerbaijani language and his works had been translated into different language. He has been an editor of “Mir” International Teleradio company, and editor-in-chief of the Association of Azerbaijani Cinematographers. Currently, he is a secretary in managerial staff of this company. Then he worked as director of literary programs studio, deputy of “Yurd” magazine and secretary of editor-in-chief of “Istedad” magazine.

He is a scenarist of “Hasan Seyidbayli”, "Yeri boş qalan adam" (Emptied place of man)(Rashid Behbudov), ”Sənsiz və ya ömrün son axşamı” (Last night of life without you") (Hasan Turabov), “Haradan başlanır vətən”( Where does homeland begin?”), Elegy (Zarifa Aliyeva) etc. He was rewarded diploma of USSR of Ministry of Culture and All-Russian Theatre Society for successfully translation of “Lost Letter” written by I.Karaceli into Azerbaijan language. He had been chief of young prose-writers union in Association of Azerbaijan Writers (1985). He graduated prose department of Literature Institute in the name of M.Qorki by correspondence. He participated in the international conference of translator in Bulgaria with Soviet delegation and he was invited on a business trip in GDR with invitation of Association of GDR Writers. He also participated as a representative in the conference of All-Russian Union which was held in Moscow. He is laureate of Humay Award. He is a Honoured Art Figure of Azerbaijan Republic.

On January 11, 2024, he was awarded the Order of "Sharaf".

== Family ==
He is married and is a father of two daughters and one son.

== Works ==
- City train.
- Forgotten meeting.
- Fireplace.
- Road.
- The world does not worth of eye tears.
