= Baba Mountain =

Baba Mountain may refer to:

- Baba (North Macedonia), overlooking the city of Bitola
- Baba (Serbia), near Paraćin
- Baba (Bosnia and Herzegovina), in Republika Srpska
- Etropolska Baba, in Balkan Mountains near Etropole
- Tetevenska Baba, in the Balkan Mountains near Teteven
- Chelopechka Baba, in the Balkan Mountains near Chelopech
- Baba Mountain, Rila, in the central Rila Mountains near the Rila Monastery
- Baba Mountain, Pirin, in the central Pirin Mountains near Orelyak
- Baba Mountain (Taiwan), in Taichung
- Koh-i-Baba or Baba Mountain range, Afghanistan

== See also ==
- Loibler Baba, a 1969 m mountain south of Klagenfurt, above Loiblpass
