= Devraha Baba =

Indian Hindu saint

- YogiSamrat Shri Devraha Baba's

Personal life
- Born: Unknown
- Died: 19 June 1990 Vrindavan, Uttar Pradesh
- Resting place: Vrindavan, Uttar Pradesh

Religious life
- Religion: Hindu
- Temple: Yogiraj Shri Devraha Baba Samadhi Sthal, Vrindavan
- Dharma name: Sanatan

Senior posting
- Based in: India
- Successor: Brahmarishi Shri Devdasji Maharaj ( Shri Bade Sarkar)

Devraha Baba was an Indian Siddha Yogi saint who lived beside the Yamuna river in Mathura. He was known as "ageless Yogi".

== Life ==
Little is known about the early life of Devraha Baba, beyond that in the first half of the 20th century he visited Mail, a town 20 km southwest of Salempur, Uttar Pradesh. Here he started living atop a machan, a high platform made of wooden logs, situated 3 km from the town on the banks of the Sarayu river. The place was near Chilma Bazar in Deoria District, thus local people started calling him Devraha Baba, with Baba being an honorific for saints or old men. Thereafter he shifted to Vrindavan, where again he lived atop a machan on the banks of the Yamuna river for the rest of his years. He visited many places in India and was known by different names in different states. At Purneswari Maa Tara Tarini Shakti Peetha in Ganjam (Odisha), locals addressed him by the name of Chamatkari Baba. Even today, the priests of Maa Tara Tarini Shakti Peetha remember his miracles during his visit to Maa's Peetha. Once Devraha Baba also attested to it in an interview with All India Radio.

Devraha Baba was a hermit from Vrindavan. He was considered to be a "spiritual guide to everyone from a pauper to the most powerful ... above narrow confines of caste and community." Village people as well as important personalities waited for hours to have a glimpse or darshan of him. He received visits from politicians seeking his blessings at the time of general elections, including Indira Gandhi, Buta Singh, and Rajiv Gandhi. Rajiv Gandhi and his wife Sonia Gandhi visited his ashram on the eve of the 1989 elections. He used to bless the devotees with his feet.

He lived on a 10-foot-high (3.0 m) wooden platform near the river and wore a small deerskin. A barricade of wooden planks hid his semi-naked body from his devotees, and he came down only to bathe in the river.

Devraha Baba is known for claims stating that he was upwards of 150 years old. According to the first president of India Dr. Rajendra Prashad, Devraha Baba was at least 150 years old, with some claims stating all the way up to 700 years old. None of these claims have ever been confirmed as being based in fact.
