= Alibabavum 40 Thirudargalum =

Alibabavum 40 Thirudargalum (lit. 'Ali Baba and the Forty Thieves') may refer to any of the following Indian films based on the folk tale from the Arabian Nights:

- Alibabavum 40 Thirudargalum (1941 film), a 1941 Indian Tamil-language comedy film adaptation by K. S. Mani
- Alibabavum 40 Thirudargalum (1956 film), a 1956 Indian Tamil-language adventure fantasy-drama film by T. R. Sundaram

== See also ==
- Ali Baba and the Forty Thieves (disambiguation)
- Alibaba Aur 40 Chor (disambiguation), Hindi film adaptations
