= Babos =

Babos (Hungarian pronunciation: [ˈbɒboʃ]) is a Hungarian surname. Notable people with the surname include:

- Adam Babos (born 1992), Hungarian artistic gymnast
- Ágnes Babos (1944–2020), former Hungarian handball player
- Dan Babos (born 2000), Welsh rugby union player
- Gábor Babos (born 1974), former Hungarian footballer
- Gyula Babos (1949–2018), Hungarian jazz guitarist
- Margit Babos (1931–2009), Hungarian mycologist
- Tímea Babos (born 1993), Hungarian tennis player

== See also ==
- Babo (disambiguation)
