= Yutaka Baba =

Yutaka Baba may refer to:

- Mokō (Yutaka Baba, born 1990), Japanese YouTuber
- Yutaka Baba (diver) (born 1934), Japanese diver
