= Babuji =

Babuji, a variant of Babu, is an Indian honorific. It may refer to:

- Sudhir Phadke (1919–2002), Indian singer-composer
- Jagjivan Ram (1908–1986), former Deputy Prime Minister of India
- Ram Chandra (Babuji) (1899–1983), Indian spiritual leader
- Ramsevak Singh (Babuji) (born 1953), Indian politician
- "Babuji", a song from the 2007 film Salaam-e-Ishq
- Babuji, a fictional character portrayed by Amrish Puri in the 1995 Indian film Dilwale Dulhania Le Jayenge

== See also ==
- Babaji (disambiguation)
- Babu (disambiguation)
