= Mike Babul =

American basketball coach (1977–2024)

Personal information
- Born: November 25, 1977 North Attleboro, Massachusetts, U.S.
- Died: December 30, 2024 (aged 47)
- Listed height: 6 ft 6 in (1.98 m)

Career information
- High school: North Attleboro (North Attleboro, Massachusetts)
- College: UMass (1996–2000)
- NBA draft: 2000: undrafted
- Position: Forward
- Coaching career: 2003–2024

Career history

Coaching
- 2002–2003: Seekonk HS (assistant)
- 2004–2005: Youngstown State (assistant)
- 2005–2006: Drexel (assistant)
- 2012–2015: Wagner (assistant)
- 2015–2019: Wagner (associate HC)
- 2019–2020: Long Island Nets (assistant)

Career highlights
- As player: 3× Atlantic 10 All-Defensive Team (1998–2000); Fourth-team Parade All-American (1996)

Mike Babul (November 25, 1977 – December 30, 2024) was an American basketball coach who was serving as the head coach of the South Shore Monarchs of The Basketball League. Before turning to coaching, he played college basketball for UMass from 1996 to 2000.

== Playing career ==
Babul attended North Attleboro High School in North Attleboro, Massachusetts. In 1995, Babul chose to play for UMass over UConn where he was a four-year letter winner and three-year starter from 1996 to 2000. During his stay with UMass, he was selected to three A-10 Conference All-Defensive and All-Academic Teams.

== Coaching career ==
Babul joined the Wagner Seahawks in 2012 and in 2014 was named the associate head coach. On September 20, 2019, he was named the assistant coach of the Nets' NBA G League affiliate, the Long Island Nets. A position he continued the following season. He also was head coach at North Attleboro High School, which he attended, and led youth basketball skill camps.

== Personal life and death ==
Babul's twin brother, Jon Babul, played college basketball for Georgia Tech.

Mike Babul died from a heart attack on December 30, 2024, at the age of 47.
