= Jorge Babu =

Brazilian politician (1965–2026)

Member of the Legislative Assembly of Rio de Janeiro
- In office 1 January 2007 – 20 August 2011

Personal details
- Born: Jorge Luis Hauat; 12 April 1965 Rio de Janeiro, Brazil
- Died: 8 February 2026 (aged 60) Rio de Janeiro, Brazil
- Party: PT (1999–2009); PTN (2009–2013); DC (2013–2024); UNIÃO (2024–2026)
- Occupation: Police officer Criminal

Jorge Luis Hauat (12 April 1965 – 8 February 2026), known by the pseudonym Jorge Babu, was a Brazilian politician. A member of multiple political parties, he served in the Legislative Assembly of Rio de Janeiro from 2007 to 2011.

Babu was also a civil police officer before his firing, and a convicted criminal. He was arrested and sentenced to seven years in prison in 2010 for association with militias in the West Zone of Rio de Janeiro, forming a criminal gang and extortion.

Babu died in Rio de Janeiro on 8 February 2026, at the age of 60.
