= Naruatsu Baba =

Japanese businessman

- Born: January 1978 (age 48); Itami, Hyogo Prefecture, Japan
- Education: Kyushu Institute of Technology
- Known for: Founder and majority owner of the smartphone-game maker Colopl

Naruatsu Baba (馬場 功淳, Baba Naruatsu) is a Japanese smartphone game developer and businessman, founder and majority owner of the smartphone-game maker, Colopl.

== Early life ==
Naruatsu Baba was born in Itami (near Osaka), Japan. He had heart problems during his youth (corrected by an operation while in university) and took up video games in lieu of intense physical activity. He graduated from Kyushu Institute of Technology.

== Career ==
Baba joined KLab in 2003 and briefly worked at GREE starting in 2007. However, even while working full-time at start-up companies, he had been developing mobile game applications and websites as a side business since his university days.

He founded Colopl in 2008 as a developer and owns 59% of the company. Colopl has five of the largest-grossing apps for Android smartphones, including Professional Baseball PRIDE, Treasure Trove Detective and Dino Dominion.

According to Forbes, he had an estimated net worth of $1.9 billion as of December 2014. The estimate had dwindled to $700 million by 2017

== Personal life ==
He is divorced, with one child.
