= Baba clan =

Baba clan 馬場 氏
- Home province: Kai

Baba clan (馬場 氏, Baba-shi) is a Japanese samurai family which was associated with Kai Province.

== History ==
The Baba were vassals of the Takeda clan.

== Select list of clan members ==
- Baba Torasada
- Baba Nobufusa
