= Anas Baba =

- Born: Gaza Strip
- Citizenship: Palestinian
- Education: Al-Azhar University
- Occupation: Photojournalist
- Employer: NPR

Anas Baba (Arabic: أنس بابا; born 1993/1994) is a Palestinian photojournalist from the Gaza Strip. He currently is a producer with American public broadcaster NPR, and has also previously worked with British newspaper The Guardian, French agency Agence France-Presse, and American newspaper The Wall Street Journal. As of October 2025, Baba is covering the Gaza war from within the Gaza Strip.

== Career ==
Baba began working as a freelance journalist at age 18, while studying journalism and English literature at Al-Azhar University in Gaza City.

Baba has worked with NPR since 2019, when he began working with NPR journalist Daniel Estrin, and was hired as a producer in 2024. Baba has expressed that he has felt supported by the NPR team throughout the ongoing Gaza war.

He covered the 2021 Israel–Palestine crisis, taking a photo of rockets that became emblematic of the crisis.

He has been covering the ongoing Gaza war since 2023. In the first weeks of the war, he reported from Gaza City, producing stories on families sheltering in hospitals and people fleeing the city on foot. He later evacuated from Gaza City to Rafah, where he lived with 210 members of his extended family in a four-story home. In December 2023, he moved to Khan Yunis to report on the Nasser Hospital before returning to Rafah. After the Israeli army's invasion of Rafah, Baba lived briefly in Bureij and Al-Zawaideh. In June 2024, he reported on Israeli military operations in the Nuseirat refugee camp, in which at least 276 people were killed.

During the war, Baba has often traveled by himself, but has socialized with other journalists, sometimes eating communal meals together.

== Personal and early life ==
Baba was born in 1993 or 1994 in Gaza. He grew up with his extended family in Rafah, and was exposed to photojournalism early on through his father, who worked for Agence France-Presse. His grandfather had originally lived in Ilut, which is now a council in Israel.

Baba's father left Gaza for Egypt in 2018, after being shot by an Israeli sniper while covering the March of Return; he now works for the AFP in Egypt. In November 2023, NPR assisted Baba in evacuating his mother and siblings to Egypt; from there, they secured visas to move to Belgium.

== Awards and recognition ==
- 2021 Amnesty Media Awards, Best Use of Digital Media (as part of The Guardian team), for their story on the Israeli military's demolition of the al-Jalaa tower.
- 2023 National Press Club Awards, Breaking News Award (as part of the NPR team), for their coverage of the beginning of the Gaza war
- 2024 Bayeux Calvados-Normandy Award for War Correspondents finalist, for his story "Cake in the time of war, in Gaza".
- 2025 duPont-Columbia Awards, The War In Gaza (as part of the NPR team)
- 2026 Louis M. Lyons Award for Conscience and Integrity in Journalism, Nieman Foundation for Journalism
