= Baba (ruins) =

Castle ruins in Prague, Czech Republic

Baba ruins
- Zřícenina Baba
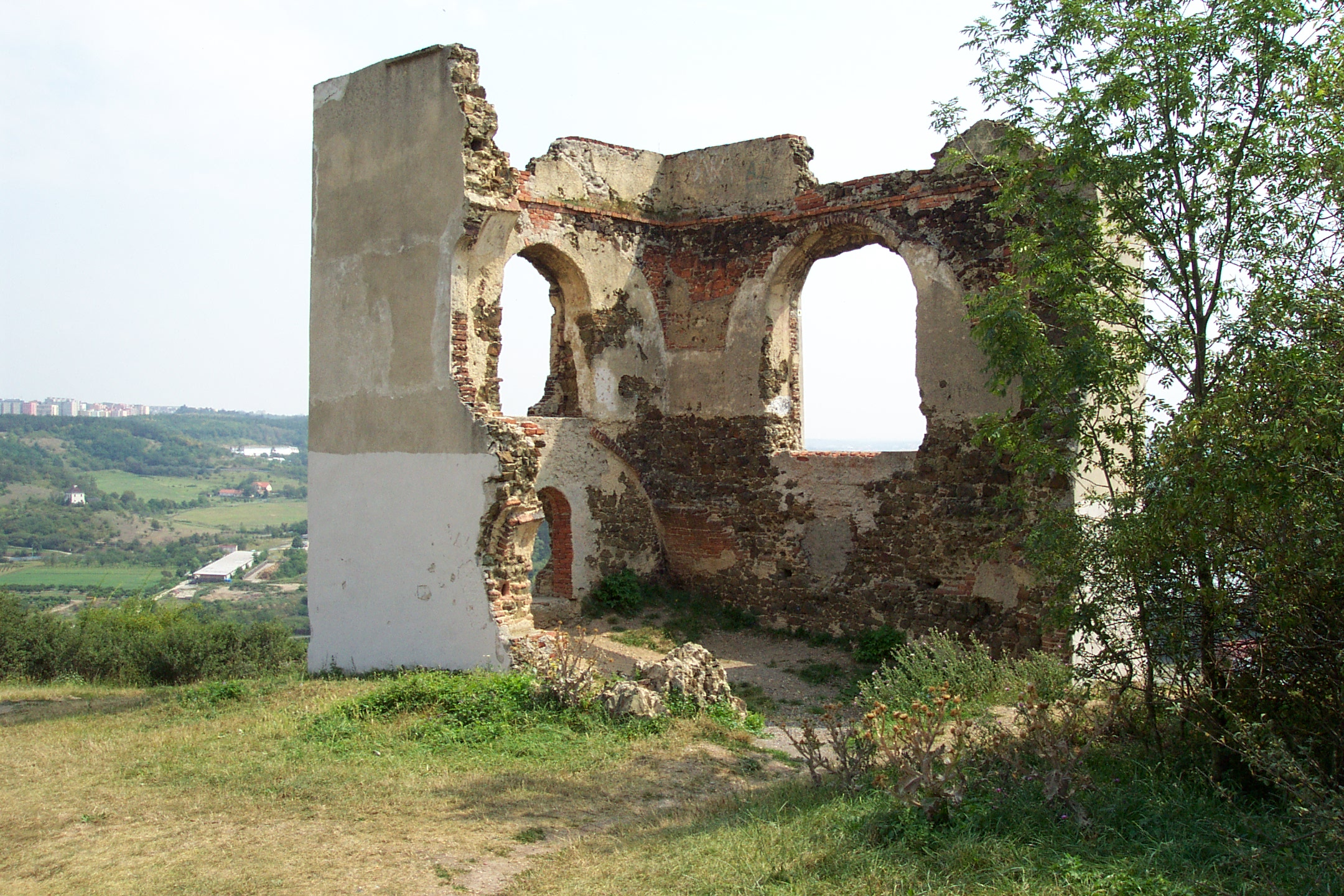
- Baba ruins in 2007
- Interactive map of the Baba ruins area
- Etymology: Baba hill

General information
- Status: Destroyed
- Type: Castle ruin imitation
- Location: Dejvice, Nad Paťankou street, Prague, Czech Republic
- Coordinates: 50.1188333°N 14.3906111°E
- Opened: 1650
- Demolished: 1840s

Technical details
- Material: Stone, masonry

Baba (Czech: Zřícenina Baba) are remains of a 17th-century winepress and an imitation of a castle ruin in Prague in the Czech Republic. It is located on a promontory on the left bank of the Vltava in Dejvice, on Baba hill (259 m above sea level). The spot offers views of Troja, Bubeneč, and Dejvice, and it is a dominant feature of this part of the valley. It is within the Baba nature monument.

== History ==
According to archaeological surveys from the 1970s, the hill has been inhabited since the early Stone Age, when a fortified settlement existed there. The name of the hill is attested from the 15th century.

In 1622, Jindřich Žežule, a local burgher, founded a vineyard on the hill. In 1650, the vineyard's owner, Servác Engel of Engelfluss, had a summer house with a wine press built there. In 1673, the vineyard and the building were bought by Tomáš Pešina of Čechorod, dean of the Metropolitan Chapter of St. Vitus in Prague, a priestly congregation, and the vineyard was henceforth known as Děkanka, or Čechorodka.

In 1748, A. T. Lohnerová bought the land and added it to the Šárka homestead. In the 1740s, during the War of the Austrian Succession, the summer house was demolished by Bavarian and French troops. In 1858, the state railways had the remains of the wine press modified as an imitation of a castle ruin.

The building is freely accessible. Since 2006, it has been illuminated at night. The red-marked tourist route number 0043, a 19 km walking trail of the Czech Tourist Club, passes around the ruins and completes a circuit around the entire territory of Divoká Šárka. The Baba ruins offer views of Troja, Bubeneč, and Dejvice, and as part of the Baba nature monument since 1982, they are a dominant feature of this part of the valley.

== Gallery ==
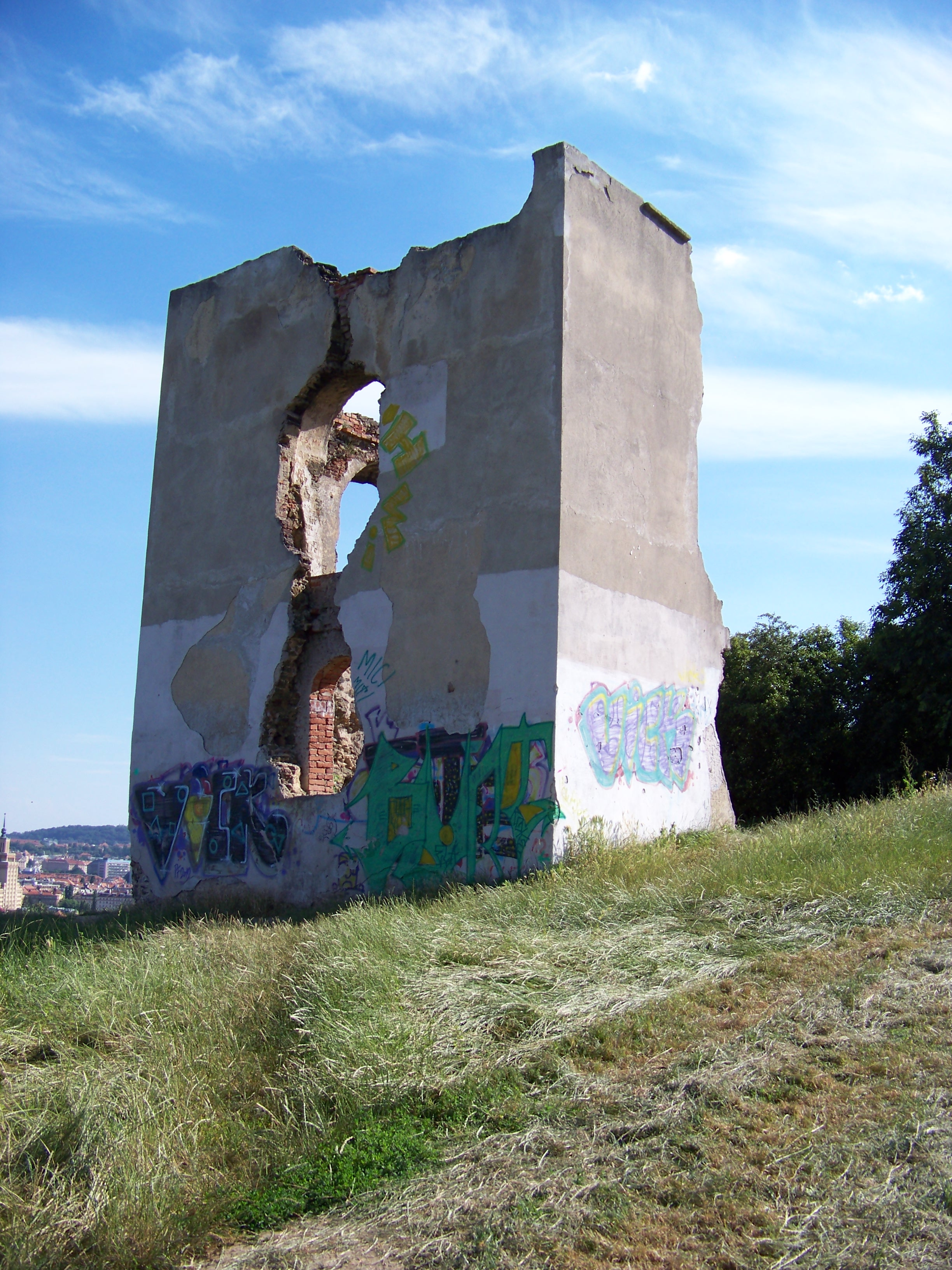
Baba ruins seen from the back

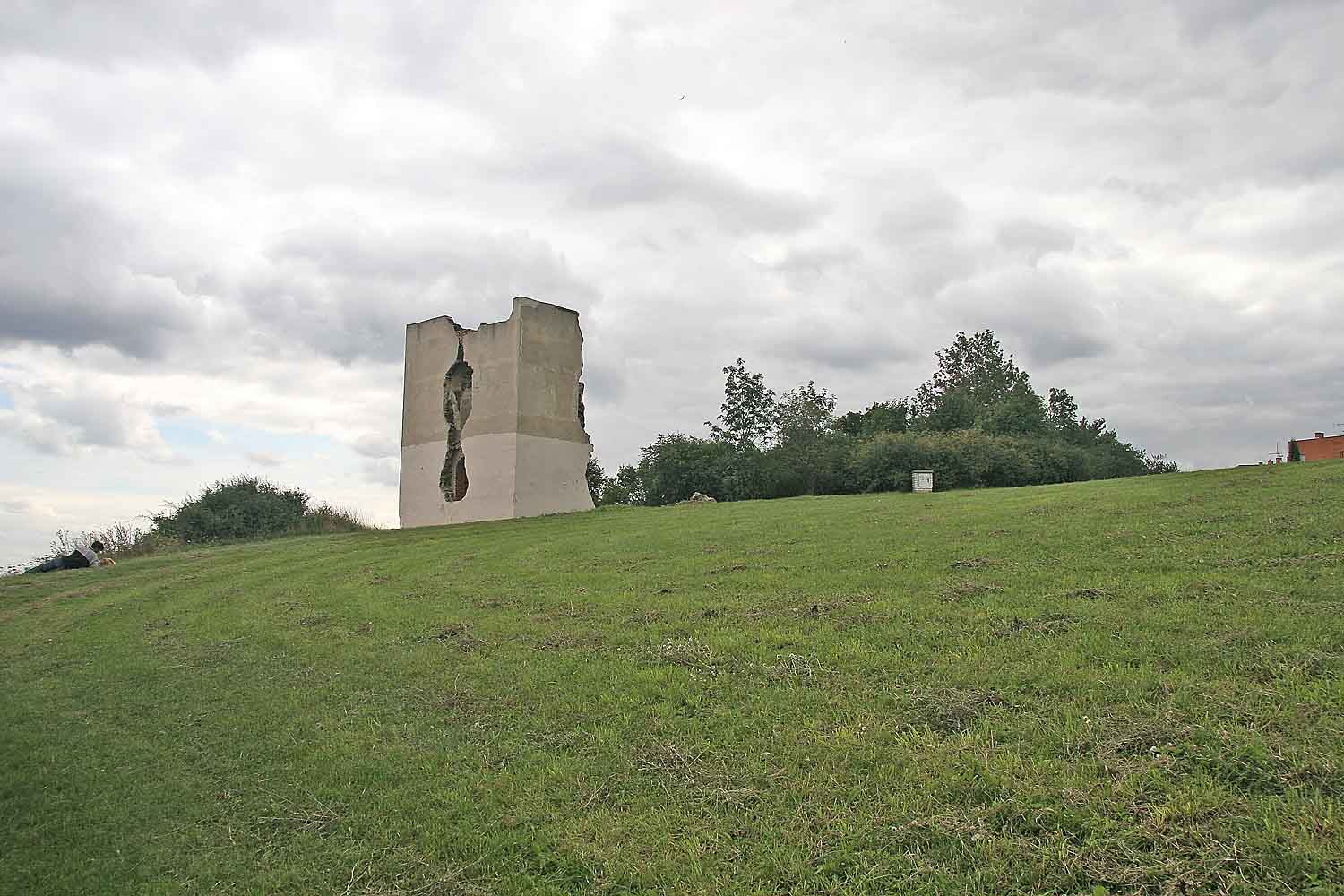
Baba ruin from a distance

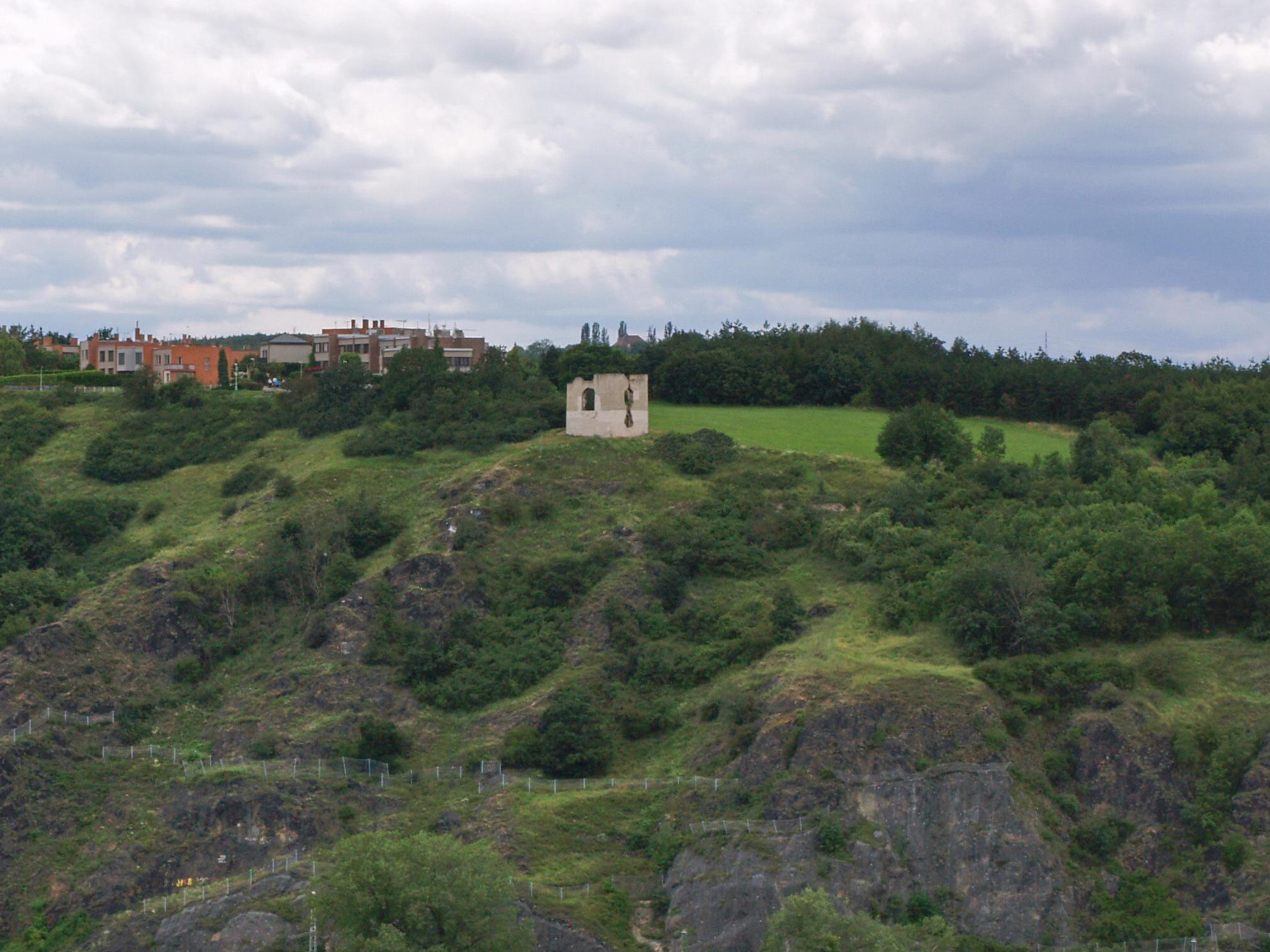
View of the ruins from across the valley

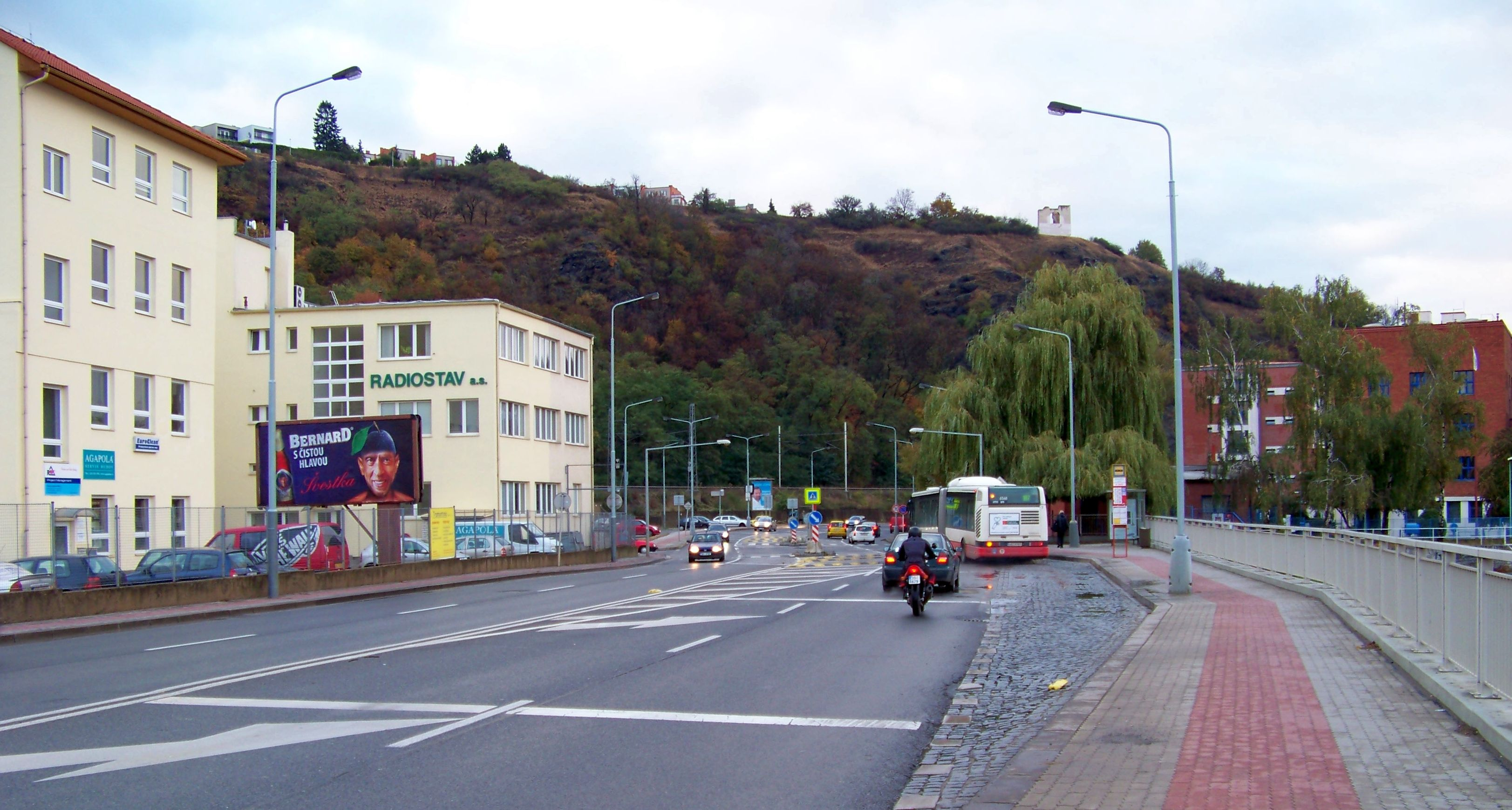
View from Podbabská street

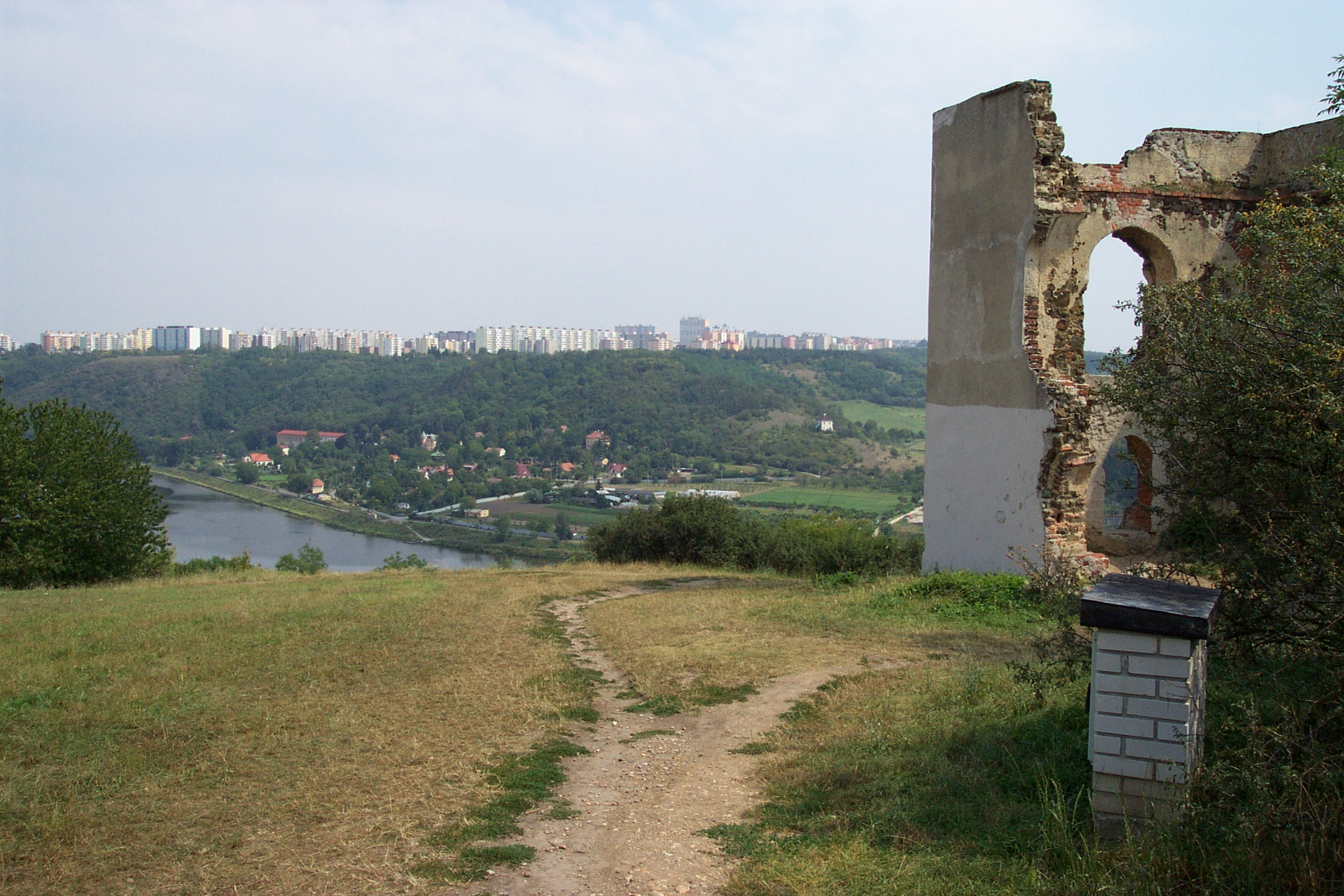
Podhoří, as seen from Baba
