= Zuhurat Baba =

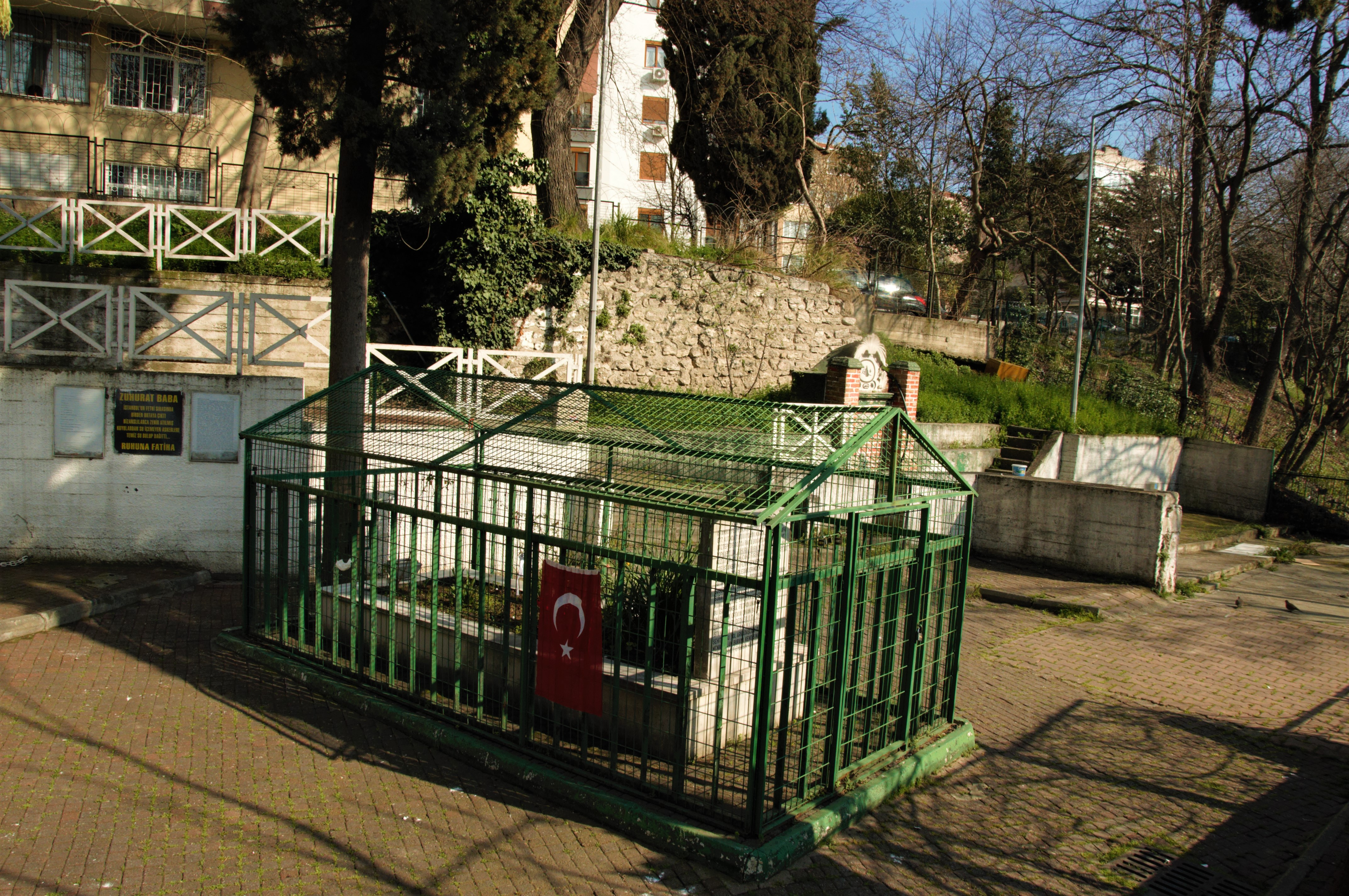
Zuhurat Baba tomb in Bakırköy

Zuhurat Baba is a custodian whose tomb is located on a district that is called as Zuhuratbaba district now in Bakırköy, Istanbul, Turkey.

== History ==
Prior to the fall of Constantinople, Ottoman Turks established three important sites including in Sariyer Telli Baba, in Kartal Gözcü Baba and in Bakırköy Zuhurat Baba, in order to watch Constantinople. During Fall of Constantinople, Byzantines poisoned many wells around the city, so Ottoman army suffered from lack of water. Supposedly shortly afterwards, an old man that appeared all at once supplied water with his waterskin for Ottoman army. Thus, Ottoman soldiers called him Zuhurat Baba due to his quick appearance, Zuhur means 'quick appearance'. After Fall of Constantinople, the soldiers noticed that the old man was dead and water from the waterskin was continuously flowing as a spring. Rumour has it that the soldiers considered that he as a fellow of Allah, was sent to help Ottoman Turks by Allah and buried him where he was.

== Culture ==
Zuhurat Baba is considered as a spiritual figure according to public opinion. Many people visit his tomb on every Friday, as well as before university or high school entrance exams as they want to pray him for success of their children.
