= Babá (footballer, born 1938) =

Brazilian footballer

Personal information
- Full name: Santino Quarth Irmão
- Date of birth: April 14, 1938
- Place of birth: Torres, Brazil
- Date of death: 17 May 2000 (aged 62)
- Place of death: Porto Alegre, Brazil
- Position: Forward

Senior career*
Years	Team	Apps	(Gls)
1959–1966	Juventude		
1967–1969	Grêmio	120	(17)
1970	Juventude		
1971	Pradense		

International career
1966	Brazil	2	(0)
- * Club domestic league appearances and goals as of 29 August 2023

Santino Quarth Irmão (14 April 1938 – 17 May 2000), better known as Babá, was a Brazilian professional footballer who played as forward.

== International career ==
Babá is called up for Brazil for the matches of 1966 Copa Bernardo O'Higgins, when players from Rio Grande do Sul represented the national team.

== Honours ==
=== Grêmio ===
- Campeonato Gaúcho: 1967, 1968
