= Mollaisaqlı =

- Municipality
- Location within Azerbaijan
- Coordinates: 40°41′03″N 47°52′50″E
- Country: Azerbaijan
- Rayon: Ismailli

Population
  - Total: 1,051
- Time zone: UTC+4 (AZT)
  - Summer (DST): UTC+5 (AZT)

Mollaisaqlı (also, Molla-Isakhly and Mollaisakly) is a village and municipality in the Ismailli Rayon of Azerbaijan. It has a population of 1,051.
