= Gül Baba (disambiguation) =

Gül Baba (died 1541) was an Ottoman poet.

Gül Baba may also refer to:

- Gül Baba, a Bektashi dervish who is said to have advised Beyezid II to found Galatasaray High School
- Gül Baba (operetta), a 1905 work composed by Jenő Huszka
- Gül Baba (1940 film), a Hungarian film directed by Kálmán Nádasdy
- Gülbaba, Kilis, a village in Kilis Province, Turkey
