= Béla Babai =

Romani-American violinist (1914–1997)

- Babai Béla
- (undated)
- Born: April 27, 1914; Graz, Austria-Hungary
- Died: October 1, 1997 (aged 83); Nesconset, New York, U.S.
- Other names: “A cigányzenekar király”
- Occupation: Violinist

Antal Béla Babai (April 27, 1914 – October 1, 1997) was a Hungarian-American of Romani descent violinist and interpreter of Romani music. Babai was born in Austro-Hungarian Empire and emigrated to the United States in the late 1930s, where he became famous as "The King of the Gypsy Violin".

Babai was born in Graz, Austria-Hungary and grew up in Kaposvár near a large community of Romani. He learned to play the violin at a young age. At age 12 he would play in a local cafe, and in later years he would keep a clipping about those performances.

After he emigrated to the United States in 1937, he noticed that the music from his country was played in Hungarian restaurants. Babai started an orchestra in which he played the violin, accompanied by a kontras (second fiddler), a bratchas (violist), a bogos (double bass), a cimbalom-player, and a cellist.

In 1953, he left Chicago for New York, where he performed in the Waldorf-Astoria Hotel.

Babai was married to Emma Horvath, who was of Bashalde Romani descent, and had a son and two daughters. He died in Nesconset, New York on October 1, 1997.

== Discography ==
- An Evening in Budapest with Bela Babai (1934)
- Gypsy Moods
- Gypsy Love (1957) (as Bela Babai and his Orchestra)
- An Evening at Chardas (as Bela Babai and his Fiery Gypsies)
- Frénésie Tzigane (as Bella Babaï)
- Gypsy Panorama
- Spiel Für Mich, Zigeuner! (as Bela Babai und sein Ungarisches Ensemble)
- Play For Me Gypsy (as Bela Babai and his Hungarian Ensemble)
- Haunting Hungarian Melodies (as Bela Babai and his Gypsy Orchestra)
- Let The Gypsies Play ("Cigányok Játszanak" Request Records, New Rochelle, NY)
- The Sound of Gypsies (Bella Babai with George Vig on tarogato; Murray Hill Records, New York, NY catalog #949199)
