= Baba Kadam =

Marathi novelist

Veersen Aanandrao alias Baba Kadam
- Born: Veersen Aanandrao Kadam; 4 May 1929; Kolhapur, Maharashtra, India
- Died: 20 October 2009 (aged 76)
- Occupations: Novelist, writer

Veersen Aanandrao alias Baba Kadam was a Marathi novelist famous for his detective novels. During his career his wrote over 50 novels, most notably, Bhalu, Panch, and Najuk Bote.

== Professional life ==
As a law graduate he worked as a police prosecutor. While working as a police prosecutor he experienced number of human incidents related to humorous side, which he penned down his experiences in the court and he became popular as a novelist. His work also gave him a deep knowledge of different police laws such as the IPC and the CrPC.
