= Baba Yabo =

Beninese comedian and actor

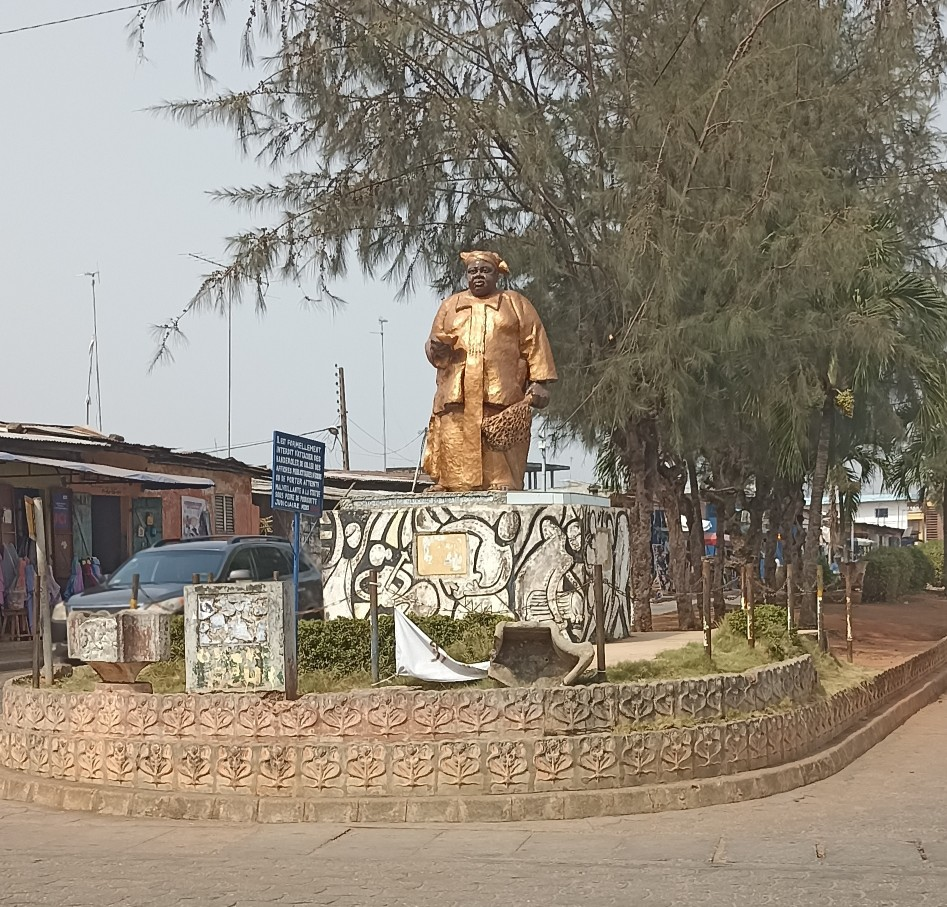
- Born: Dèhoumon Adjagnon; 13 March 1925; Porto-Novo, Benin
- Died: 1 February 1985 (aged 59)
- Occupations: Comedian, actor
- Years active: 1940–1985

Dèhoumon Adjagnon (13 March 1925 – 1 February 1985), popularly known by his stage name Baba Yabo, was a Beninese comedian and actor. One of the most popular comedy actors in Benin, he revolutionized the world of theater in Benin with his unique comedy style and storytelling.

== Personal life ==
Yabo was born on 13 March 1925 in Porto-Novo, Benin.

He is the father of Frédéric Joël Aïvo.

== Career ==
In the 1980s, Yabo started theater acting with his Towa konou troupe and companion Mamoudou Eyissê alias Mister Okéké and Antoine Sokênou. He exercised the profession of driver to Finance in Benin, then the Lycée Toff I at Porto Novo.

== Legacy ==
There is a 2-meter high statue of Yabo erected in his memory in the Zèvou district in Porto-Novo.
