= Babi Island =

Babi Island or Pulau Babi may refer to:

- Babi Island (Aceh) in Indonesia
- Babi Island (Flores) in Indonesia
- Babi Kecil Island, Belitung in Indonesia
- Pulau Besar (Johor) in Malaysia, previously known as Pulau Babi Besar
