= James Baba =

Ugandan politician and former diplomat

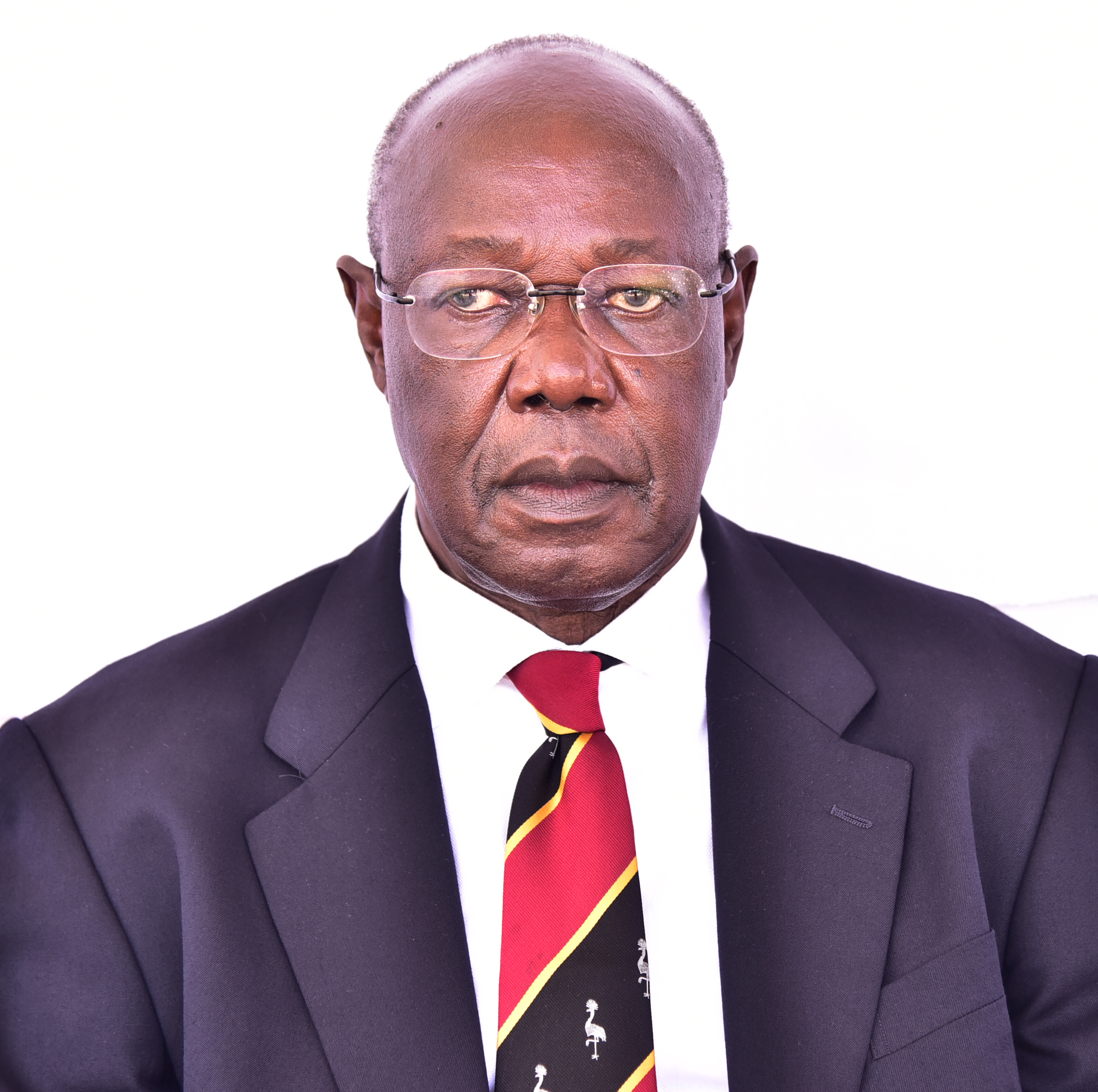
- Baba James Boliba
- Born: 10 May 1945 (age 81); Uganda
- Citizenship: Uganda
- Education: Makerere University (Bachelor of Arts in History); University of Nairobi (Diploma in International Relations); St. John's University (Master of Arts in Public Administration)
- Occupations: Administrator and politician
- Years active: 1991–present
- Known for: Politics

James Boliba Baba is a Ugandan politician and former diplomat. He served as the State Minister for Internal Affairs in the Ugandan Cabinet. He was appointed to that position on 27 May 2011. He replaced Matia Kasaija, who was appointed State Minister of Finance for Planning. Prior to that, he served as the State Minister in the Office of the Vice President, from 2006 until 2011. On account of his cabinet ministerial position, he is also an ex-officio Member of Parliament (MP). In 2021, he was elected to parliament as a member of parliament for Koboko. in the parliament of Uganda, he served on the Committee on East African Community Affairs.

In the 2026 general elections, he did not contest for his MP position for Koboko County after he stepped down from active politics and was subsequently dropped from the cabinet of ministers for the ruling term 2026-203. Boliba was succeeded by Emmanuel Natal Banya of the National Resistance Movement (NRM), who was elected to the seat unopposed.

== Early life and education ==
James Baba was born in Koboko District on 10 May 1945. He holds the degree of Bachelor of Arts in history, from Makerere University, Uganda's oldest public university. He also holds a postgraduate diploma in international relations, obtained in 1975 from the University of Nairobi. His Master of Arts degree in public administration was awarded in 1993 from St. John's University in Queens, New York City.

== Career ==
James Baba has worked as a civil servant in Uganda's Ministry of Foreign Affairs (Uganda) and as an Ambassador at Uganda's foreign missions. Between 1991 until 1994, he served as Uganda's Ambassador and Deputy Permanent Representative to the United Nations in New York City. He then served as the Director of the Africa Department, within the Ministry of Foreign Affairs (Uganda) in Kampala, Uganda. Between 1998 and 2001, he served as the director of regional cooperation within the Foreign Affairs Ministry. Between 2001 and 2005, James Baba served as Uganda's ambassador to Japan. He joined politics in 2006, by successfully contesting for the parliamentary seat of "Koboko County", Koboko District, serving as the MP until 2011. In the 2011 National election cycle, he lost during the primaries to the incumbent MP, Ahmed Awongo, also of the National Resistance Movement political party. In May 2011, he was appointed State Minister for Internal Affairs.

== Personal details ==
He is married. He is reported to enjoy listening to classical music, reading, exercising and volunteering within the community.

== Honours ==
Japan:

- Order of the Rising Sun, Gold And Silver Star (2018)

== See also ==
- Parliament of Uganda
- Cabinet of Uganda
- Koboko District
