= Standing Baba =

Hindu who has vowed to remain standing

A Standing Baba, or Khareshwari, is a Hindu who has vowed to stand, not sitting or lying down even to sleep. The vow is a form of Hindu Tapa (or Tapasas), a self-inflicted corporal punishment intended to help bring spiritual enlightenment. Khareshwari are primarily found in India.

The length of the vow is unclear. One source says that the vow lasts for twelve years. Other sources do not attach a specific time frame.

Khareshwari traditionally stood under trees. This may be connected to the Yoga position known as Vrikshasana (Tree pose). A seventeenth-century engraving shows some images of what may be Standing Baba.

More recently Khareshwari seem to stand inside. Author Gregory David Roberts places Babas inside in his description of Khareshwari in the novel Shantaram. Additionally, two online photos of Khareshwari both show men inside, not under a tree.

The Standing Baba have a swing-like device that allows them to rest their arms during the day. During the night, a Khareshwari will support his torso on the swing as he sleeps. The swing usually has a sling beneath it. The sling can hold one of the Khareshwari's legs at a time. It is unclear if this is intended to rest one leg or to increase the pressure on the other leg. While Khareshwaris may walk about, they usually just stand, or hang, in their swing.

Standing for years at a time causes swollen legs and ulcerated feet. Roberts and others describe the Khareshwari tapa as extremely painful and even permanently disabling.
