= Baba Nation =

Norwegian band

Baba Nation was a Norwegian soul/funk band, founded in the city of Bergen by Jan Erik de Lange Gullaksen in 1990. They were originally known as Yee ’Ha Wanna Have A Baba before changing the name of the group in 1995.

Their biggest hit, "Too Bad", had a 17-week hit list run. Other popular singles include "Ragamuffinmini" and the ballad "Time to Heal".

== Discography ==
=== Albums ===
- Do This'' (1994) as Yee ’Ha Wanna Have A Baba
- Love Express (1996)
- «B» (1998)

=== Singles ===
- "Too Bad" (1999)

== Members ==
- Erik Røe, vocals
- Jan Erik de Lange Gullaksen, guitar
- Knut Hillersøy, keyboard
- Nicolai Hauan, bass
- Tore Christian Sævold, drums (pre 1995)
- Tor Bjarne Bjelland, drums (1995)
- Ingolf Torgersen, drums (1995)
- Morten Skaug, drums (1995-)
