= Alibaba Aur 40 Chor =

Alibaba Aur 40 Chor (lit. 'Ali Baba and the Forty Thieves') may refer to any of the following Indian films based on the folk tale from the Arabian Nights:

- Alibaba Aur 40 Chor (1954 film), 1954 Indian fantasy action film by Homi Wadia
- Alibaba Aur 40 Chor (1966 film), 1966 Indian adventure fantasy film by Homi Wadia
- Alibaba Aur 40 Chor (1980 film) or Adventures of Ali-Baba and the Forty Thieves, 1980 Indian-Soviet action adventure film by Latif Faiziyev and Umesh Mehra
- Alibaba Aur 40 Chor (2004 film), 2004 Indian fantasy film by Sunil Agnihotri

== See also ==
- Alibabavum 40 Thirudargalum (disambiguation), Indian film adaptations in Tamil
- Ali Baba and the Forty Thieves (disambiguation)
