= Toshifumi Baba =

Japanese baseball player and coach

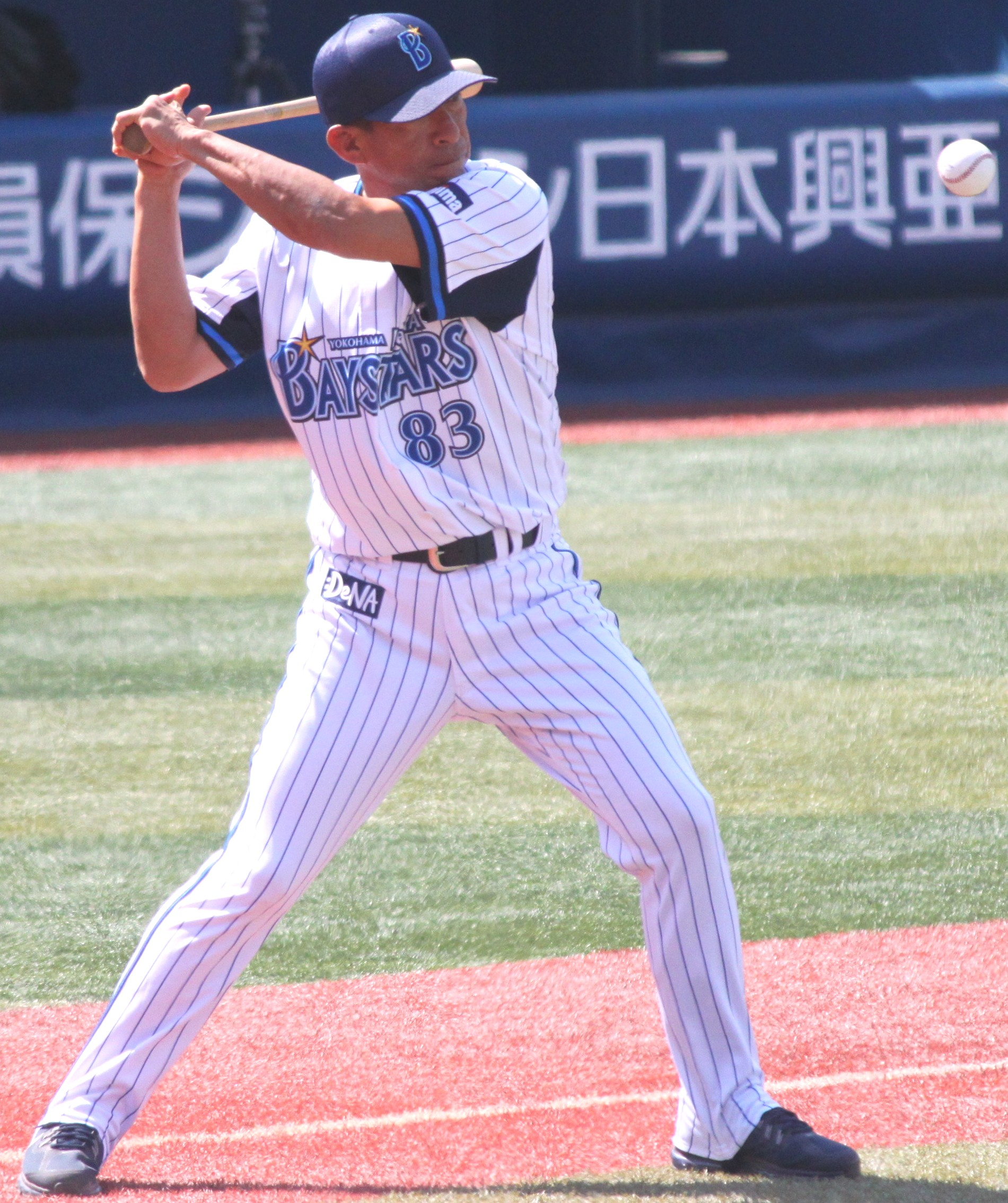

Hanshin Tigers – No. 81
- Infielder / Coach
- Born: February 10, 1965 (age 61); Ōki, Fukuoka, Japan
- Batted: Right Threw: Right

NPB debut
- April 10, 1990, for the Fukuoka Daiei Hawks

Last NPB appearance
- October 11, 2000, for the Yakult Swallows

NPB statistics
- Batting average: .242
- Hits: 328
- Home runs: 12
- RBI: 119
- Stolen bases: 8
- Stats at Baseball Reference

Teams
- As player: Fukuoka Daiei Hawks (1990–1993); Orix BlueWave (1994–1997); Yakult Swallows (1997–2000); As coach: Orix BlueWave (2001–2003); Yakult Swallows/Tokyo Yakult Swallows (2004–2008); Orix Buffaloes (2009); Yokohama BayStars/Yokohama DeNA BayStars (2010–2015); Hanwha Eagles (2016); Saitama Seibu Lions (2017–2021); Hanshin Tigers (2023–)

Career highlights and awards
- 2× Mitsui Golden Glove Award (1995, 1996); 2× Japan Series Champion (1996, 1997)

Toshifumi Baba (馬場 敏史, Baba Toshifumi; born February 10, 1965) is a former baseball player from Japan. He primarily paid for Orix Blue Wave in the Japan Pacific League.
