= Bowa-ye Sofla =

Bowa-ye Sofla بواي سفلي
- Village
- Location within Iran
- Coordinates: 30°45′36″N 50°28′58″E
- Country: Iran
- Province: Kohgiluyeh and Boyer-Ahmad
- County: Kohgiluyeh
- Bakhsh: Central
- Rural District: Dehdasht-e Gharbi

Population (2006)
  - Total: 232
- Time zone: UTC+3:30 (IRST)
  - Summer (DST): UTC+4:30 (IRDT)

Bowa-ye Sofla (Persian: بواي سفلي, also Romanized as Bowā-ye Soflá; also known as Bābā, Bābā Khāneh, Bovā, and Bowā-ye Pā’īn) is a village in Dehdasht-e Gharbi Rural District, in the Central District of Kohgiluyeh County, Kohgiluyeh and Boyer-Ahmad Province, Iran. At the 2006 census, its population was 232, in 44 families.
