= Baba Balia =

Spiritual guru and preacher

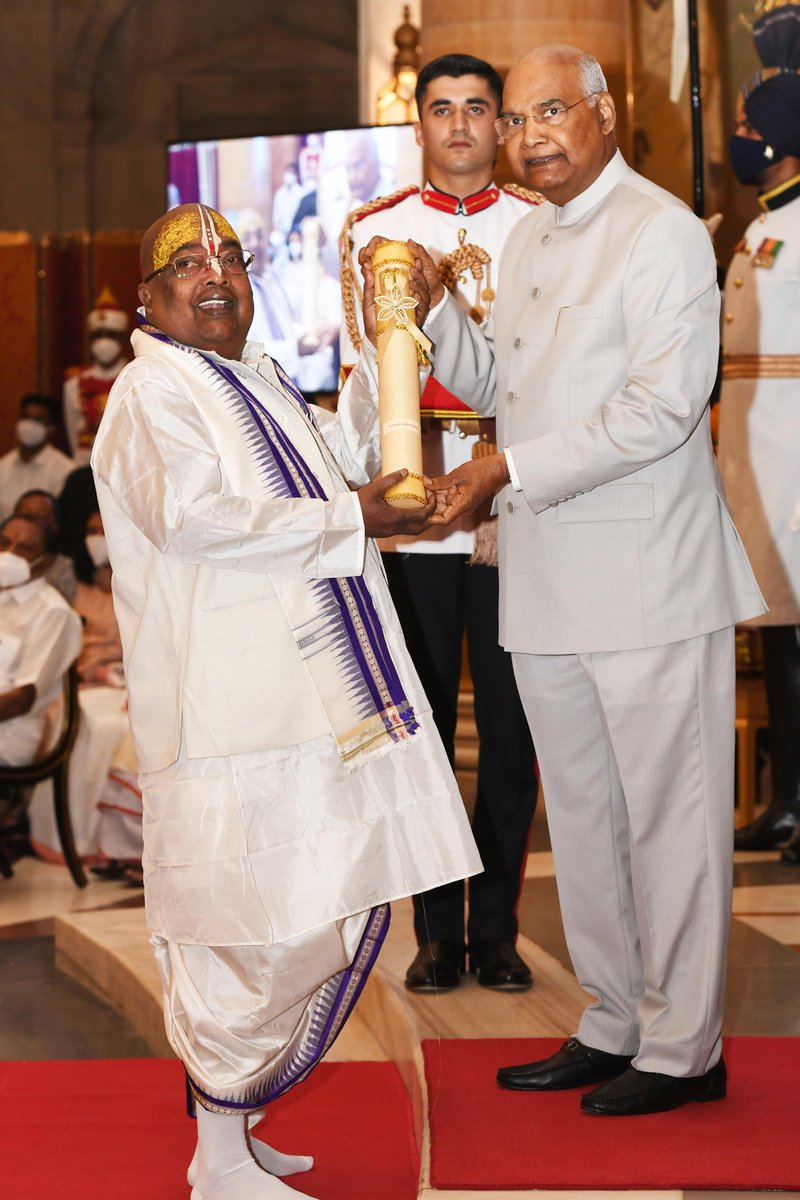

Baba Balia (born in April 1954) is a spiritual guru and preacher from Odisha, India. He is a social reformer trying to eradicate superstitions, mobilising support to members of the vulnerable sections of society, opposing child marriage and supporting widow remarriage, providing relief to victims of natural calamities like floods and cyclones, and taking up several similar activities.

The activities taken up by Baba Balia include:

- Organizing dowry-free marriages of girls belonging to vulnerable sections of society
- Campaigning for widows' right to live in dignity
- Organising "Bratoponayan sanskar" (Sacred Thread Ceremony) of poor boys every year
- Advocating health check-up both bride and bride-groom before solemnization of marriage instead of matching of horoscopes
- Creating awareness through public campaigns to take medical aid for recovery from snake bite instead of resorting to help from wizards
- Organising rescue and relief operations during natural disasters like flood, cyclone and fire in inaccessible coastal area of Odisha
- Advocating for protection of forests and conservation of bio-diversity
- Working for the revival and popularization of "Lokanatya", "Pala" and "Sankirtan", the traditional cultural forms of folk dance and music

== Recognition ==
- In the year 2022, Govt of India conferred the Padma Shri award, the third highest award in the Padma series of awards, on Srimad Baba Balia for his distinguished service in the field of social work. The award is in recognition of his service as a "Social and Spiritual Leader from Jagatsinghapur working with Odisha's poor and backward communities".

== Additional reading ==
- Images of Baba Balia Ashram at Marjita, Odisha: "Baba Balia Ashram Marjita, Odisha 754153, India". World Orgs. IN.WorldOrgs.com.
- "Spiritual Guru Baba Balia opts to donate trust property to Odisha government". Orissa Diary. Odisha Diary Foundation. 14 September 2017.
