= Mokō =

Japanese YouTuber and Streamer (born 1990)

Yutaka Baba
- 馬場 豊
- Born: 15 November 1990 (age 35); Osaka Prefecture, Japan
- Other name: もこう
- Education: Nara Sangyo University
- Occupations: YouTuber; streamer; voice actor; singer; tarento
- Years active: 2009–present
- Height: 164 cm (5 ft 5 in)

YouTube information
- Channel: もこうの実況
- Years active: 2013–present
- Genre: Let's Play
- Subscribers: 1.60 million
- Views: 1.81 billion
- Last updated: August 5th, 2026

Yutaka Baba (馬場 豊, Baba Yutaka; born 15 November 1990), also known as Mokō (もこう) is a Japanese streamer, YouTuber, voice actor, singer and former professional gamer. He posts Let's Play videos on YouTube and Niconico, and perform as a tarento on video game-related programs. He uses the real name when acting as a voice actor.

== Biography ==
Mokō was born on 15 November 1990 in Osaka Prefecture where he graduated from Nara Sangyo University.

On 2004, when Mokō was in the first-grade of junior high school, he was hospitalized for ulcerative colitis. On 2005, Mokō was left the hospital and attended the school, but he couldn't accustomed to the already formed circle of friends, so he left the classroom immediately after introducing himself and was truancy from the day. Mokō said that when he was truancy, he spent most of the time playing with Puyo Puyo and watching the Internet. Around this time, Mokō was active on the hikky (hikikomori) board on 2channel as "Tomoaki" (智明). Also, it is recorded that Mokō was live streaming on FC2 Net Radio, and the videos is released charges fees on Mokō Channel.

On 2006, Mokō graduated from junior high school and entered upper secondary school correspondence education.

On 25 May 2009, when Mokō was in the first-grade of the university, he posted "Lecture on How to Hunting Strong Pokémon" (厨ポケ狩り講座, Chū Poke Gari Kōza) (Let's Play video of Pokémon Battle Revolution) as his first video as the name of Mokō on Niconico. By September 2010, he had posted fifty-five videos of the series, and he became a popular contributor with his frank words and actions.

In March 2013, Mokō graduated from the university. After graduating Mokō began to work as a systems engineer.

On 17 August 2013, Mokō opened his owned YouTube channel.

On 1 August 2015, Mokō retired from the systems engineer.

Mokō made his debut as a voice actor in the role of Savage in "MagicalStone", an online puzzle video game released in March 2016. In June 2017, Mokō made his debut as a voice actor under the name of Yutaka Baba in "Sengoku Genbu", a mobile game for the smartphone.

In the document written by the Ministry of Internal Affairs and Communications in March 2018, Mokō was mentioned as "a famous streamer from Niconico". On 17 April, Mokō was elected as one of the first eleven professional gamer of Puyo Puyo licensed by the Japan esports Union. However, Mokō calls himself "streamer" and "game streamer", because he is thinking that he is not a big wheel of a video game but a professional streamer.

On 10 August 2020, Mokō performed in the seminar planned by students "New Age of Medical Treatment and Video Games" at Tohoku University. Mokō expressed his own opinion about the future of medical treatment and video games on the live streaming on YouTube from his position that he is active as a professional gamer and a popular streamer, even though he is a patient with ulcerative colitis.

As of 2022, Mokō has retired from a professional gamer of Puyo Puyo.
