= Bhabha (surname) =

Bhabha is an Indian surname. Notable people with the surname include:

- Homi J. Bhabha (1909–1966), Indian nuclear physicist
- Homi K. Bhabha (born 1949), professor at Harvard University and theorist of postcolonialism
- Huma Bhabha (born 1962), Pakistani sculptor working in New York
- Jacqueline Bhabha (born 1951), lecturer at the Harvard Law School
