= Joseph Marius Babo =

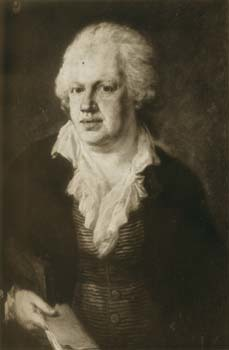
- Oil portrait by Johann Georg Edlinger
- Born: 14 January 1756; Ehrenbreitstein
- Died: 5 February 1822 (aged 66); Munich

Joseph Marius Babo (January 14, 1756 in Ehrenbreitstein – February 5, 1822 in Munich) was a German dramatist. As a dramatist, Babo preferred action based on history. In Otto von Wittelsbach, written in 1781, he followed the path blazed by Goethe in Götz von Berlichingen. Sometimes one could see he was acquainted with Shakespeare. He filled a variety of pedagogical and bureaucratic roles related to the theater over his life.

== Works ==
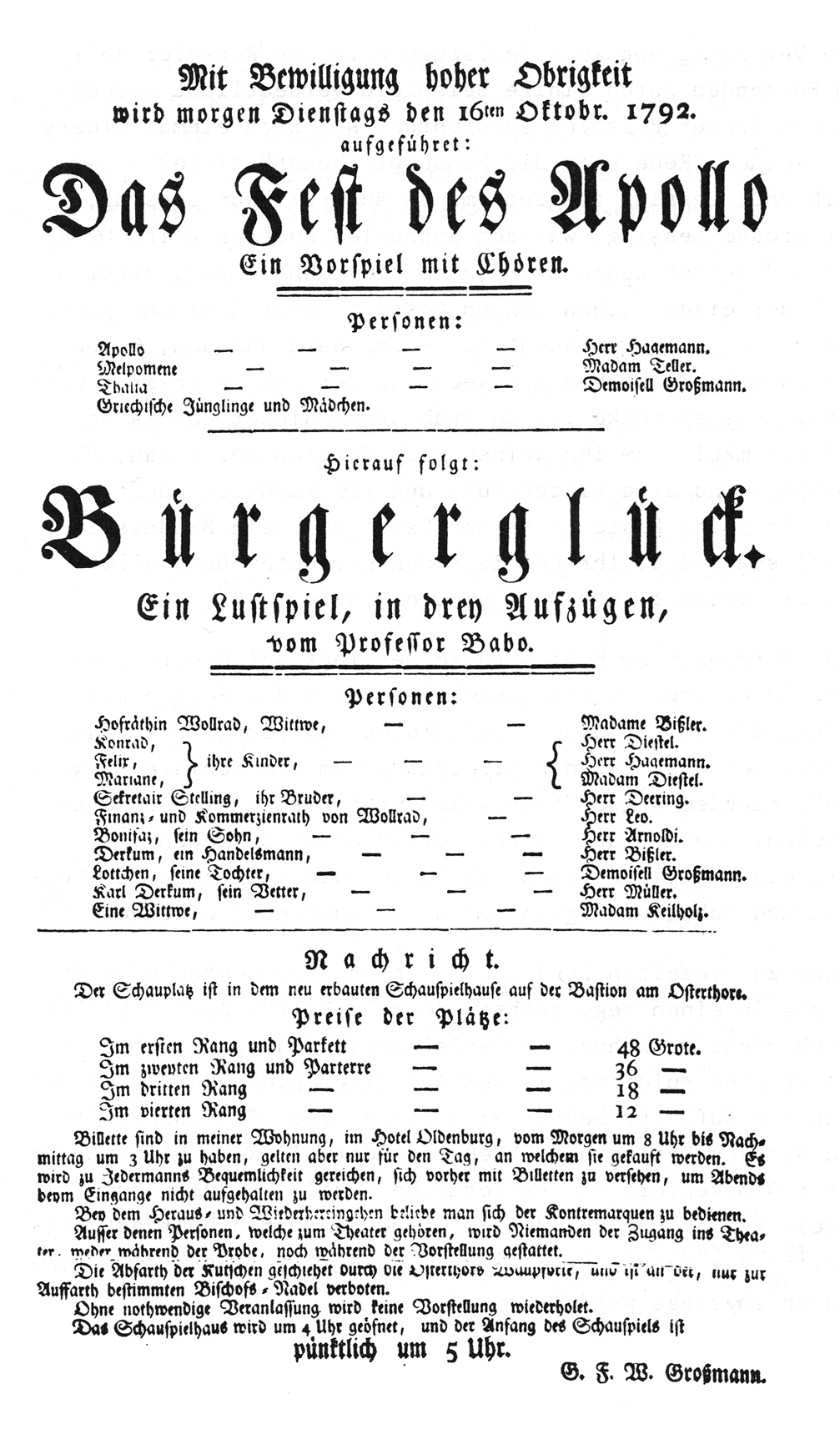
Playbill for the debut of Bürgerglück on the occasion of the dedication of the Bremer Stadttheater (1792)

- Arno (1776)
- Das Lustlager (1778, probable author)
- Das Winterquartier in Amerika (1778)
- Dagobert der Franken König (1779; English edition: Dagobert, King of the Franks, 1800)
- Reinhold und Armida (1780)
- Die Römer in Teutschland (1780)
- Otto von Wittelsbach (1782), a play based on the life of Otto II Wittelsbach, Duke of Bavaria (1206–1253), and Count Palatine of the Rhine
- Die Maler (1783)
- Die Fräulein Wohlerzogen (1783)
- Ueber Freymaurer. Erste Warnung (1784)
- Nöthige Beylage zur Schrift: Über die Freymaurer „erste Warnung“ (1784)
- Gemälde aus dem Leben der Menschen (1784)
- Vollständiges Tagebuch der merkwürdigsten Begebenheiten und Revolutionen in Paris (1789, translated from French)
- Die Strelitzen (1790)
- Bürgerglück (1792)
- Anleitung zur Himmelskunde in leichtfaßlichen astronomischen Unterhaltungen (1793)
- Schauspiele (1793)
- Neue Schauspiele (1804)
- Der Puls (1805)
- Albrechts Rache für Agnes (1808)

== Bibliography ==
- Pfeuffer, Ludwig: Joseph Marius Babo als Leiter des Münchener Nationaltheaters 1799–1810. München, Univ., Diss., 1913
- Wurst, Jürgen: Joseph Marius Babo. In: Wurst, Jürgen und Langheiter, Alexander (Hrsg.): Monachia. München: Städtische Galerie im Lenbachhaus, 2005. S. 163. ISBN 3-88645-156-9
