= Baba (Serbia) =

Mountain in Serbia

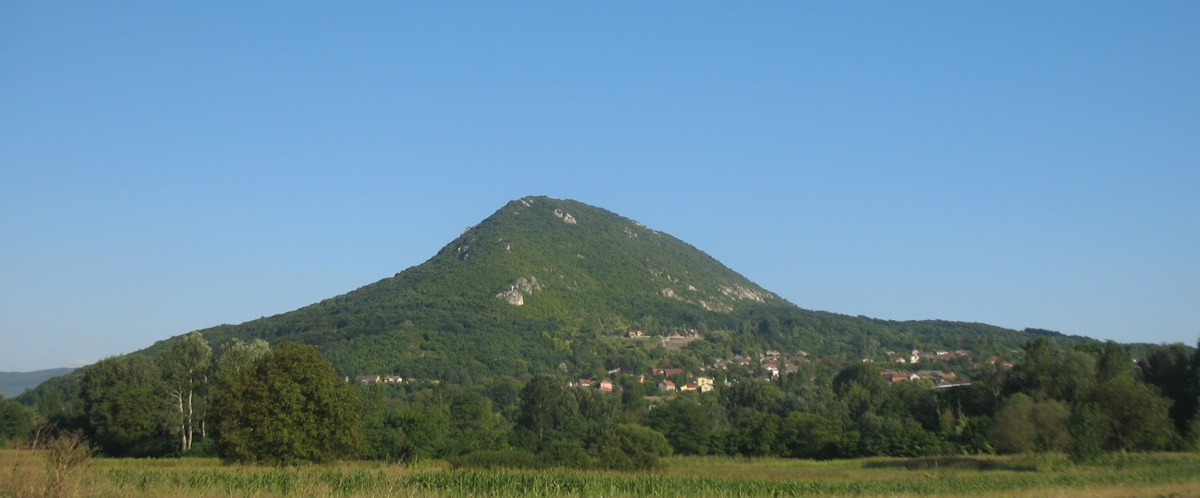
- View of Baba

Highest point
- Elevation: 657 m (2,156 ft)
- Coordinates: 43°50′13″N 21°33′06″E

Geography
- Location within Serbia
- Location: Central Serbia
- Parent range: Carpathian Mountains

Baba (Serbian Cyrillic: Баба) is a mountain in central Serbia, to the east of the town of Paraćin. It has an elevation of 657 metres above sea level.

Lešje Monastery, an Eastern Orthodox monastery at the northern edge of the mountain, dates back to the 14th century.

== See also ==
- List of mountains in Serbia
