= Babù =

Brazilian footballer (born 1980)

Babú
Personal information
- Full name: Anderson Rodney de Oliveira
- Date of birth: 23 December 1980 (age 45)
- Place of birth: São Paulo, Brazil
- Height: 1.78 m (5 ft 10 in)
- Position: Forward

Team information
- Current team: Casertana (assistant coach)

Senior career*
Years	Team	Apps	(Gls)
2001–2003	Salernitana	27	(3)
2003–2004	Venezia	21	(0)
2004–2007	Lecce	43	(6)
2007	→ Hellas Verona (loan)	12	(1)
2007–2009	Catania	2	(0)
2008	→ Triestina (loan)	4	(0)
2008–2009	→ Avellino (loan)	7	(1)
2009–2011	Cisco Roma	54	(4)
2011	Latina	7	(1)
2012	Pergocrema	9	(0)
2013	Paganese	9	(0)
2013	Roma	0	(0)
2013–2014	Maccarese	9	(1)
2014	Ilvamaddalena	11	(1)
2014–2015	Puteolana	17	(2)
2015–2016	Sibilla	15	(3)
2016–2017	Palmese	8	(3)
2017–2019	Afro Napoli United		
2019–2020	Real Agro Aversa		
- * Club domestic league appearances and goals as of February 2012

Anderson Rodney de Oliveira (born 23 December 1980), known as Babù, is a Brazilian football coach and former player. He is currently an assistant coach at Casertana.

== Playing career ==
=== Early career ===
A forward, Babù started his career off in Italy, being noted by Zdeněk Zeman in 2001 during a youth football tournament in Rome; as Zeman was head coach of Serie B side Salernitana at the time, he had him signed for the club. He made a total of 27 appearances in 2 seasons, scoring 3 goals for the Salerno based club. In 2003, he moved to recently relegated Serie A side Venezia, where Babù played in 21 games, but failed to score a single goal in his single Serie B season with the club. In 2004, he was purchased by Serie A side Lecce, rejoining Zeman as head coach, where he would spend the next 3 seasons. He managed to score 6 goals in 47 total appearances for the central Italian club. Following his longest spell with one team as a professional footballer, he was signed by then Serie B side Hellas Verona F.C. in 2007. He stayed for just under one season and made just 12 appearances scoring just once.

=== Catania ===
Following his short stint in Verona, he signed for Sicilian giants Calcio Catania, where he found it hard to find any playing time making just two substitute appearances, not scoring. Hence he was sent on loan to Triestina, where he would remain for the remaining six months of the season. He spent the entire 2008–09 season on loan at Avellino, in the Italian Serie B, yet he only managed seven appearances and a single goal. He was released by mutual consent in July 2009.

== Coaching career ==
On 30 December 2022, Babù joined Casertana as an assistant to newly appointed head coach Vincenzo Cangelosi, former long-time assistant of Zdeněk Zeman.
