= Baba (honorific) =

Honorific term

Baba ("father, grandfather, wise old man, sir") is a honorific term, used in several West Asian, South Asian, Balkan and African cultures.

It is used as a mark of respect to refer to Hindu ascetics (sannyasis) and Sikh gurus, as a suffix or prefix to their names, e.g. Sai Baba of Shirdi, Baba Ramdev, etc.

Baba is also a title accorded to Alevi clerics of Shi'a Islam, also among Sunni leaders and heads of certain Sufi orders, as in Baba Bulleh Shah, Baba Farid, and Rahman Baba.

One of the most revered high priests in Samaritan tradition is Baba Rabba, literally "The Great Father". He lived c. 3rd–4th century C.E.

Baba is also the title used for the Israeli Kabbalistic rabbis of the Abuhatzeira family, descendants of Rabbi Israel Abuhatzeira, originally from Morocco, who was called the Baba Sali, and his brother Isaac Abuhatzeira, the Baba Chaki.

The term was also adopted in Malaysia as an honorific of respect to address Chinese people born in the British Straits Settlement.

Baba is also the familiar word for "father" in many languages (see mama and papa); in many different cultures it has even been adapted to address male children. In West African Yoruba culture, “Baba” means father. It is also the root of “Babalawo”, which literally means “father of secrets. A Babalawo is a traditional priest in the Yoruba/Orisha spiritual tradition. Baba also means grandmother in many countries, e.g., short for babushka (Russian for grandmother).

== See also ==
- Baba (name)
- Indian honorifics
