= Business class airline =

Airline concept

A business class airline is an airline concept which emerged during the mid-first decade of the 21st century a number of airlines that operated all-business class service.

== History ==
In the decade of 2000s, several dedicated business class airlines, including Eos Airlines, MAXjet Airways, SilverJet and L'Avion have been launched. Early on, the idea was considered potentially lucrative, however the business model became vulnerable when in 2008 oil prices surpassed $100 a barrel. Between late 2007 and 2008, MAXjet, Silverjet and Eos Airlines all ceased operations, with Silverjet ceasing operations in 2008 and L'Avion in 2009.

Virgin Atlantic and British Airways both proposed founding rival all-business class subsidiaries until the oil crisis put an end to Virgin Atlantic's plans. L'Avion continued to trade, and was purchased by British Airways for its subsidiary OpenSkies at a price of £54m in July 2008. OpenSkies operated an all Boeing 757 business-class service from Paris Orly Airport during October 2008 to June 2012. Since June 2012, the premium economy Eco class was reintroduced to OpenSkies.

Currently, there are only two all-business class airlines: La Compagnie and beOnd. La Compagnie, which was founded in 2013, provides an all business class service between Orly Airport in Paris and Newark Liberty International Airport. The service was initially provided by two Boeing 757-200 aircraft; these were replaced with two Airbus A321neos starting from 2019.

Additionally, a startup known as Odyssey Airlines planned to launch all-business class flight from London City Airport to New York using Airbus A220-100 aircraft, though the initial launch date of 2016 was not met and, as of March 2024, the service had yet to launch.

== Airlines with all-business class service ==
Until October 2013, Singapore Airlines flew the longest and biggest all-business class flights on their Airbus A340-500 from Singapore to New York, also the world's longest scheduled flight, and to Los Angeles.

Lufthansa once offered all-business class service from 2002 on routes from Germany to India, Middle East and North America using leased Privatair Boeing Business Jets and Airbus Corporate Jets. However, those services have been reconfigured to include an economy class section on board. The Swiss International Air Lines in the Lufthansa group also offered all-business class flights with Boeing Business Jet between Zurich and Newark, before being replaced by three Airbus A340 aircraft in 2012.

Hong Kong Airlines formerly operated flights from Hong Kong to London with their all-premium Airbus A330-200, with business and first class sets on board. This product was discontinued in September 2012. Subsequently, these A330s were wet leased to Hainan Airlines, which operated all-business class flights between Beijing and Shenzhen in the same configuration.

Until October 2015, Scandinavian Airlines operated an all-business class route between Houston and Stavanger, using a Boeing 737-700. The route was primarily aimed at people working in the oil industry. The aircraft was then used to fly between Newark and Copenhagen before being reconfigured.

All Nippon Airways once operated an all-business class configuration Boeing 737-700ER from Tokyo Narita to Mumbai, from 2007 to their retirement in 2013. After the aircraft's retirement, the route has been upgauged to a Boeing 787-8, which also includes economy and premium economy class seats.

KLM once offered the service by using Boeing Business Jet, wet leased from PrivatAir, on the route of Amsterdam to Houston.

In 2014, Qatar Airways launched the all-business class Qatar Airways Flights 15 and 16, travelling between Doha and London Heathrow Airport, with A319LR. The flight was then upgraded to use Boeing 787, after a year's operation. The aircraft were also used on routes to Jeddah and Dubai before being reconfigured.

In October 2009, British Airways launched the first longhaul jet operations using a STOLport runway, named "Club World London City" (aka CWLCY), offering a business class only Airbus A318 service between New York JFK and London City Airport. As the short runway at London City limits the amount of fuel an aircraft can take off with there, the westbound service touches down in Ireland to refuel. To minimise wasted time, CWLCY passengers on BA001 go through United States border preclearance at Shannon Airport as the aircraft refuels. The flight then lands as a domestic flight into New York JFK, without the need to clear customs or immigration again. Eastbound flights are direct from New York JFK to London City Airport LCY. They use the same flight numbers (BA001-BA004) as were previously used by Concorde. Concorde, which was a single cabin all-premium service, could have been said to be the world's first all-business class service, although Concorde's on the ground and on board service was significantly better than that in both Business and First Class.

Saudia launched an all-business class flight with the Airbus A319-100 between Jeddah and Riyadh in year 2016, operated by PrivatAir.

== List of all-business class airline carriers ==
For the majority of its history Midwest Airlines offered an all-business class service and cabin configuration in its DC-9 and Boeing 717 aircraft. This was discontinued in its later years in an effort to financially survive before being shut down as an individually certificated independent airline by its new Republic Airways Holdings owners.

- Air Atlanta (defunct)
- British Airways - London City Airport to JFK Airport operated in Airbus A318 (defunct)
- Eos Airlines (defunct)
- L'Avion (defunct)
- La Compagnie
- Legend Airlines (defunct)
- Air One (defunct)
- MAXjet Airways (defunct)
- MGM Grand Air (defunct)
- Midwest Airlines (Stopped offering all business class service from 2003)
- OpenSkies (defunct)
- Regent Air (defunct)
- Silverjet (defunct)
- UltrAir (defunct)
- beOnd

== Other all-business class (charter) airline carriers d/b/a's ==
- PrivatAir ops for Lufthansa Airlines and Scandinavian Airlines

== List of present all-business class routes ==
- La Compagnie - both Milan Malpensa Airport and Orly Airport to Newark Liberty operated in Airbus A321neo
- beOnd - as of 2025 offers flights from Milan Malpensa Airport, King Khalid International Airport, Zurich Airport, and Al Maktoum International Airport to and from Velana International Airport in the Maldives.

== List of premium service "airline within an airline" marketing brands ==
- British Airways Club World London City
- JetBlue Mint
- Midway Metrolink
- United p.s.
