= BA1 =

BA1 may refer to:

- A postcode district in the BA postcode area
- A flight number associated with British Airways' Concorde service, later used for the BA Club World London City service
- Band Aid (band)
- Lineage BA.1, a variant of the Omicron strain of SARS-CoV-2 that causes COVID-19

== See also ==
- BA (disambiguation)
- b1a (disambiguation)
