= Ba River =

Ba River may refer to several rivers:

- Ba River (Nanpan River), in China, tributary to Nanpan River
- Ba River (Salween River), in China, Myanmar and Thailand, tributary to Salween River
- Ba River (Fiji)
- Ba River (Mull), distributary of the Loch Bà on the Isle of Mull, Scotland
- Ba River (Rannoch Moor), distributary of the Loch Bà in Rannoch Moor, Grampian Mountains, Scotland
- Ba River (Vietnam), the upstream part of Đà Rằng River
