= Qatar Airways Flights 15 and 16 =

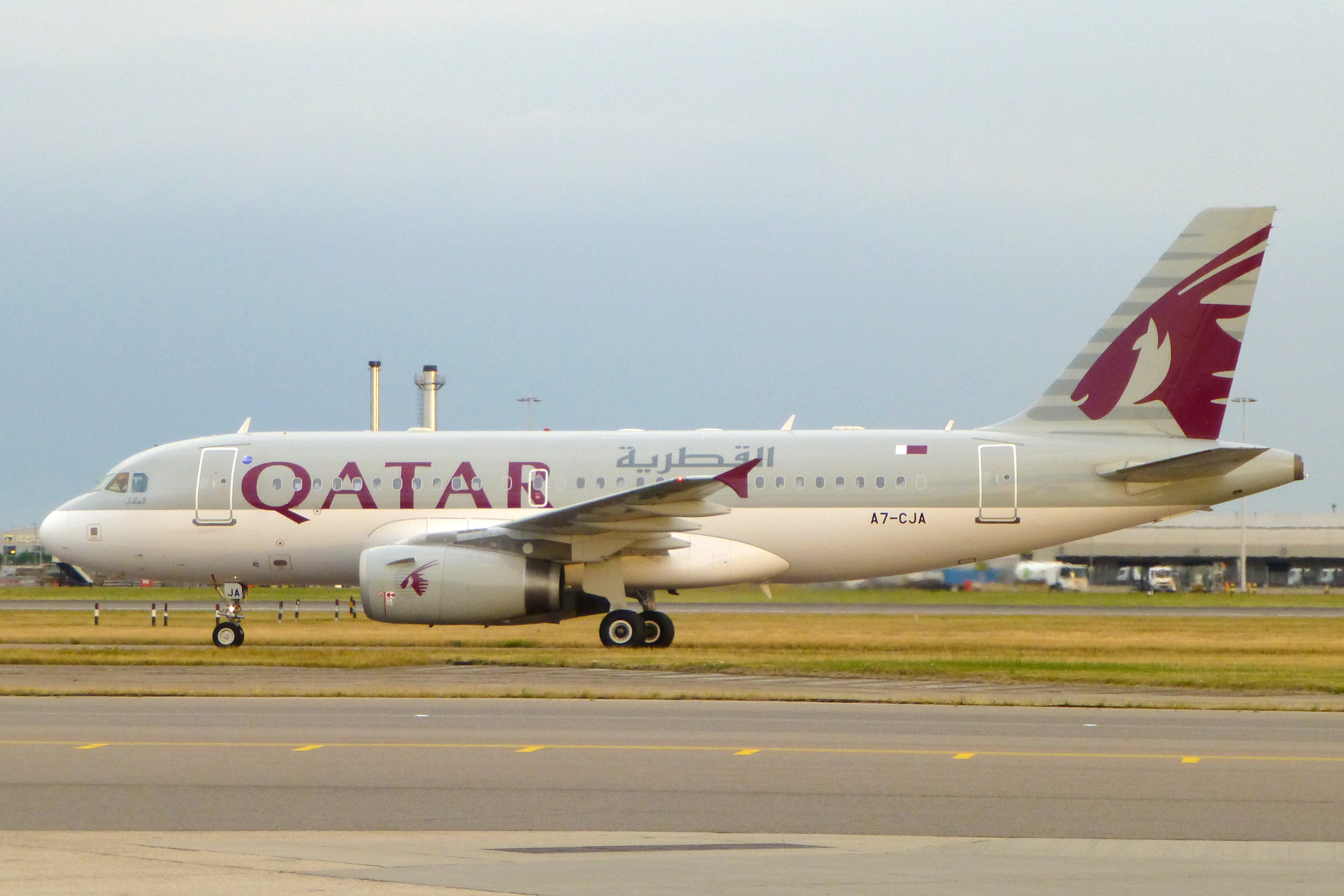
A Qatar Airways A319 in 2014

Qatar Airways Flight 15 (IATA: QR15, ICAO: QTR15) and Qatar Airways Flight 16 (IATA: QR16, ICAO: QTR16), marketed as the Qatar Airways Business One service were all-business-class flights operated by Qatar Airways from its home of Doha to London—Heathrow in the UK's capital city, and returning home to Doha from London—Heathrow. The flights were operated with aircraft in a 40-seat configuration from 15 May 2014 to 15 November 2015. It was the second all-business class service from London Heathrow to the Persian Gulf area, after Silverjet's short-lived Luton to Dubai International Boeing 767 service, which was terminated in late 2007/early 2008.

== History ==
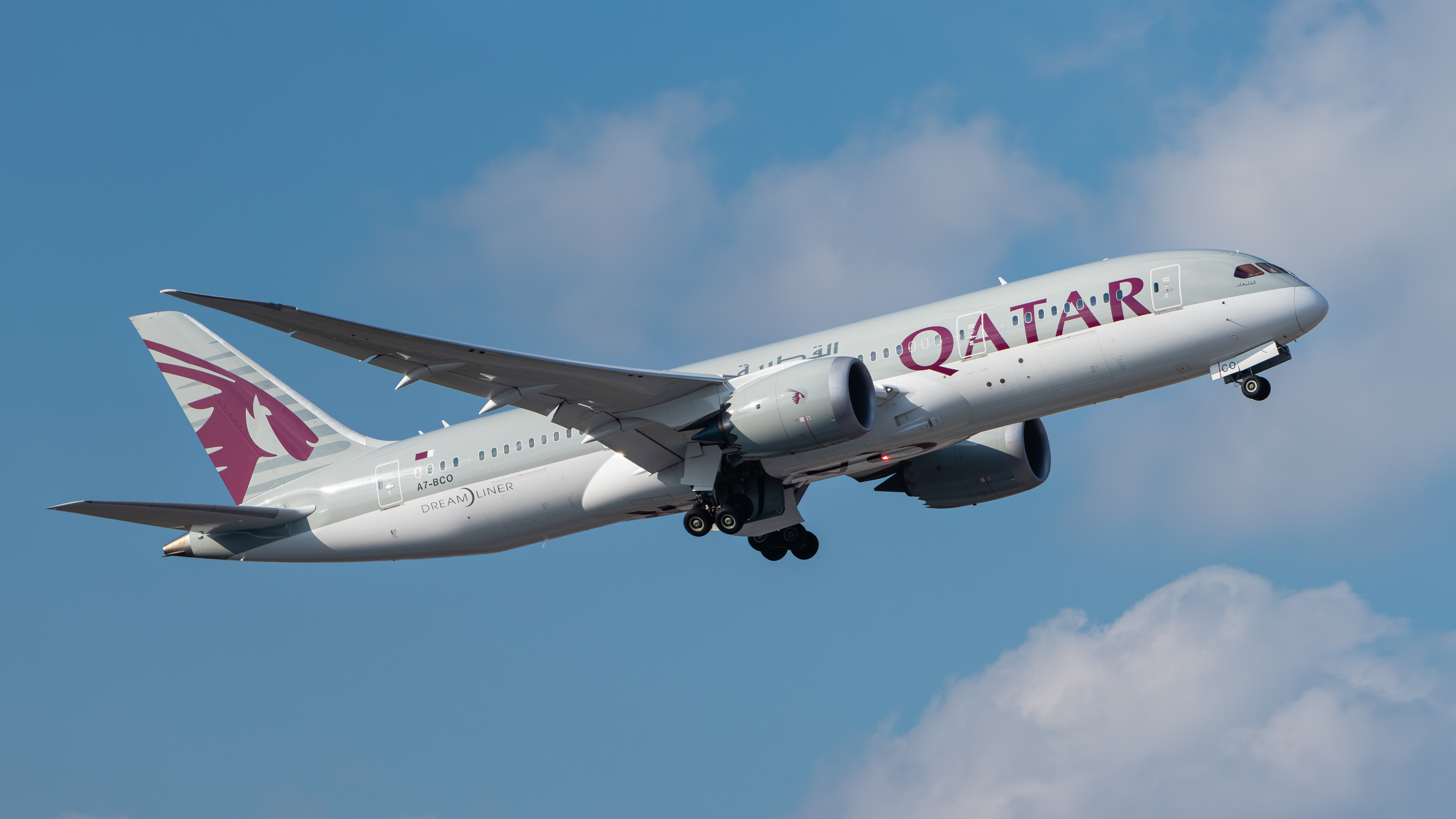
A Qatar Airways Boeing 787-8, the aircraft type that replaced the A319.

On 18 February 2014, Qatar Airways announced an all-business class flight operating between Heathrow Airport in London and Hamad International Airport in Doha. The flight was the sixth daily flight operated by Qatar Airways between Doha and London, increasing the number of weekly services between the two cities from 35 to 42, and would be operated with an Airbus A319 in an all-business class configuration. Service commenced on 15 May 2014, and the flight operated from Heathrow Terminal 4.

In July 2015, Qatar Airways announced that the all-business class Airbus A319 service would be discontinued on 25 October 2015, with Boeing 787 Dreamliner aircraft replacing the A319 on the route. Qatar Airways also operated an all-business class service on the Doha to Jeddah route, and uses this aircraft on its Qatar Executive charter service. However, the A319 service was later extended to 15 November 2015.

As of March 2018, the flights are operated by the Airbus A350-1000, of which Qatar Airways is the launch customer.

== A319 flight ==
Qatar Airways Flight 15 operates from Hamad International Airport in Doha to Heathrow Airport in London, while Flight 16 is the return flight from London to Doha. Flight 15 departs Doha at 14:50 and arrives at Heathrow at 20:25, and Flight 16 departs Heathrow at 21:55 and arrives at Doha the next day at 06:40. The flight is operated daily.

The Airbus A319LR that operated the flight was fitted with an all-business class layout with 40 seats, in a single-aisle, 2-2 seating configuration. Prior to the conversion to an all-business class layout, the aircraft was previously in a conventional two-class configuration with 8 business class seats and 102 economy class seats, for a total of 110 seats. The business class seats used were Collins Aerospace Diamond seats that could be reclined to a fully flat bed, and featured the airline's Oryx entertainment system, plus AC laptop power and inflight mobile phone access.

== Reception ==
At the time of the announcement, Business Traveller magazine noted that the schedules for the flight "appear logical" and would appeal to business people wanting to maximize working time. One Mile at a Time noted that the business class seats on the A319 operating the flight were inferior to the "Super Diamond" business class seats on Qatar Airways' Boeing 787 and Airbus A380 aircraft operating the same route, and said that the service was "puzzling".

An analysis by Centre for Aviation noted that the service was more likely to succeed than other previous failed all-premium flights. The analysis noted the lower risk of this route due to the comparatively short distance between London and Doha, small A319 aircraft with only 40 seats, the flexibility, reputation and premium positioning of Qatar Airways, and the focus on local rather than connecting traffic.

Business Traveller gave a positive review, noting the quicker boarding and deboarding time compared to wide-body aircraft, and more personal attention by staff, but also noted that the seats on the aircraft were quite narrow and were smaller than normal business class seats.

== See also ==
- Club World London City, a set of all-business-class flights operated by British Airways between 2009 and 2020
