= BA2 =

BA2 may refer to:

- A postcode district in the BA postcode area, England
- Brain Age 2: More Training in Minutes a Day!, a game
- BA.2, a subvariant of the SARS-CoV-2 virus
- Do They Know It's Christmas? § Band Aid II

== See also ==
- BA (disambiguation)
- BAA (disambiguation)
- Baba (disambiguation)
- B2A (disambiguation)
- 2BA
