= BBA (disambiguation) =

BBA may refer to:

== Arts, entertainment and media ==
- "BBA" (song), a 2024 song by Paris Hilton featuring Megan Thee Stallion
- Beck, Bogert & Appice, a hard rock power trio
- Big Brain Academy, a video game
- Big Brother Africa, a reality TV series
- Biochimica et Biophysica Acta, a biochemistry journal
- Strawberry Shortcake's Berry Bitty Adventures

== Education ==
- Bachelor of Business Administration (BBA), an undergraduate degree
- Burr and Burton Academy, a high school in Vermont, US

== Law ==
- Balanced Budget Act, a 1997 US legislative package
- Balanced budget amendment, a type of constitutional rule

== Organisations ==
- Bachpan Bachao Andolan, an Indian campaign against child labour
- Boston Bar Association, professional association in the United States
- British Bankers' Association
- British Board of Agrément, certifies construction products

== Places ==
- Bordj Bou Arreridj Province, Algeria
  - Bordj Bou Arreridj, the capital city
- Berlin Brandenburg Airport, Berlin, Germany

== Other uses ==
- BBA Aviation, an aviation services company
- Best bitter ale, a British beer style; see Bitter (beer)
- Bilateral breast augmentation
- Bush Boake Allen, a company taken over by International Flavors & Fragrances
- Short form of Japanese derogatory slang "ばばあ" (Old hag)

== See also ==
- B2A (disambiguation)
- BA (disambiguation)
