= BA =

BA or variants may refer to:

- Bachelor of Arts, an academic degree

== Businesses and organizations ==
- The New York Stock Exchange abbreviation for Boeing
- Bibliotheca Alexandrina, a library and cultural center in Egypt
- Booksellers Association of the UK and Ireland
- British Academy
- British Airways, a British airline
- British Association for the Advancement of Science, now British Science Association
- Bundesagentur für Arbeit, Federal Employment Agency of Germany
- Selskap med begrenset ansvar, a type of Norwegian company with limited liability
- Brewers Association, trade group in the United States

== Languages ==
- Aka-Bo language, an Indian language, also known as Ba
- Bashkir language, ISO 639-1 language code ba
- Ba (cuneiform), a sign in cuneiform texts
- Ba (Indic), in Indic abugidas
- Ba (Javanese) (ꦧ), in the Javanese script
- Ba (kana), in syllabic Japanese script
- Ba (Mongolic), in alphabets used to write Mongolic and Tungusic languages
- Arabic letter ب, named باء bāʾ
- bǎ construction, in Chinese

== People ==
- Ba (given name), in Myanmar and ancient China
- Ba (surname), a West African surname
- Ba (pharaoh), an early Egyptian or ancient Egyptian king

== Places ==
=== The Americas ===
- Buenos Aires, Argentina
- The Bahamas, WMO country code

=== Asia ===
- Ba (state), an ancient state in eastern Sichuan, China
- Ba River (China)
- Ba, Tha Tum District, Thailand
- Ba River (Vietnam)
- Bandra railway station, Indian Railways code BA
- Ba'a, Rote, Indonesia
- Bahrain, obsolete NATO, FIPS and LOC MARC country code
- Banan District, Chongqing, China, formerly Ba County
- Bazhou, Hebei, China, formerly Ba County

=== Europe ===
- BA postcode area, Bath, England
- Ba (Ljig), Serbia
  - Ba Congress, 1944
- Bosnia and Herzegovina, ISO-3166 country code BA
  - .ba, the top-level domain for Bosnia and Herzegovina

=== Oceania ===
- Ba Province, Fiji
  - Ba (town)
  - Ba District, Fiji
  - Ba River (Fiji)
- Ba (Open Constituency, Fiji)

== Science and technology ==
- Ba (genus), land snails
- ba space, in mathematics
- Barium, chemical symbol Ba
- Barye, a measurement unit of pressure
- 6-Benzylaminopurine, plant hormone
- BA, sublineages of the SARS-CoV-2 Omicron variant
- British Association screw threads, a set of small screw threads
- Ba, the Chinese name of the star Epsilon Serpentis
- Bronze Age, an archaeological period

== Sport ==
- Ba F.C., a Fijian football club
- Ba game, a version of medieval football played in Scotland
- Basketball Australia, promoting basketball in Australia
- Batting average, a statistic in cricket and baseball
- Bowls Australia, a governing body
- Kirkwall Ba Game, or The Ba', annual event in Orkney, Scotland

== Transportation ==
- Ford Falcon (BA), an Australian car
- NZR B^{A} class, a New Zealand steam locomotive classification
- West Sumatra (vehicle registration prefix BA)

== Other uses ==
- BA, dominical letter for a leap year starting on Saturday
- Ba (soul), an Ancient Egyptian concept of the soul or spirit
- Ba. (band), a Lithuanian rock band
- "B.A." Baracus, a fictional character in TV series The A-Team
- Beerenauslese, or BA, a German late-harvest wine
- Business agent (labor), a position in some local trade unions
- Business analyst, one who processes, interprets and documents business processes
- Blue Archive, a game developed by NEXON
- Ba, or bah, a sound commonly used in Nintendo games
- "BA", a song by Quavo from the album Qrömelife

== See also ==
- Ba River (disambiguation)
- BAA (disambiguation)
- Bah humbug (disambiguation)
- Loch Bà (disambiguation)
- Ya ba, drug containing methamphetamine and caffeine
- Boston and Albany Railroad, reporting mark B&A
