= B2A =

B2A may refer to:

- Business-to-government (business-to-administration)
- Haplogroup B2a, a subtype of Haplogroup B (mtDNA)
- B2A (BRT), a bus route in Guangzhou
- B2A class, traditional motorcycles with sidecars in sidecar racing for the Sidecar World Championship
- Brantly B-2A light helicopter
- Northrop-Grumman B-2A Spirit stealth bomber

== See also ==
- 2BA
- BA2 (disambiguation)
- BAA (disambiguation)
- BBA (disambiguation)
- BA (disambiguation)
