= Ba, Fiji =

Ba, Fiji may refer to:

- Ba Province, a province of Fiji
- Ba District, Fiji, within Ba Province
- Ba (town), within Ba Province
- Ba River (Fiji)
