= BAA =

BAA or Baa may refer to:

== Letters and sounds ==
- Baa, onomatopoeic representation of the noise made by caprinae animals (e.g. sheep and goat)
- Bāʾ, the Arabic letter ب
- Baa, the fifth consonant of the Thaana script used in the Dhivehi language

== Places ==
- Baa Atoll, an administrative division of the Maldives
- Ba'a, the capital of the Indonesian island of Roti
- BAA Ground, a now defunct cricket venue in Rangoon, Burma

== Transportation ==
- Barnham railway station, West Sussex, England (National Rail station code BAA)
- Bialla Airport, Papua New Guinea (IATA code BAA)

== Organisations ==
- BAA plc, a former British airport operator, now called Heathrow Airport Holdings
  - BAA USA, the American subsidy of BAA plc.
- Basketball Association of America, the former name of the National Basketball Association
- Billiard Association of America, former name of the Billiard Congress of America
- Birmingham Architectural Association, a professional association of architects based in Birmingham, England
- British Astronomical Association, a national association of amateur astronomers in the UK
- Boston Athletic Association, sports association for the city of Boston (US), hosts such events as the Boston Marathon
- Broadway Across America, a theatre company

== Other uses ==
- British Animation Awards
- Batting average against, a statistic in baseball that measures a pitcher's ability to prevent hits
- Bachelor of Applied Arts, a degree
- Backing Australia's Ability, an innovation plan
- Broad Agency Announcement, a technique for United States government agencies to contract for basic and applied research and certain development
- Kwah language, also known as Baa, a Niger-Congo language

== See also ==
- Baa, Baa, Black Sheep (disambiguation)
- Ba (disambiguation)
- B2A (disambiguation)
- BA2 (disambiguation)
