= Black sheep (disambiguation) =

Black sheep is an idiom used to describe an odd or disreputable member of a group, especially within a family.

Black sheep may also refer to:

== Arts and entertainment ==
=== Films ===
- The Black Sheep (1920 film), a British silent film directed by Sidney Morgan
- Black Sheep (1935 film), an American romantic drama film directed by Allan Dwan
- The Black Sheep (1949 film), a Mexican drama film directed by Ismael Rodríguez
- The Black Sheep (1960 film), a West German crime film directed by Helmut Ashley
- The Black Sheep (1968 film), an Italian comedy film starring Vittorio Gassman
- The Black Sheep (1992 film), also known as Le Mouton noir, a documentary film directed by Jacques Godbout
- Black Sheep (1996 film), American comedy film starring Chris Farley and David Spade
- Black Sheep (2006 New Zealand film), New Zealand horror comedy film by Jonathan King
- Black Sheep (2006 German film), a German comedy film directed by Oliver Rihs
- Black Sheep (2018 film), a British documentary short

=== Music ===
==== Performers ====
- Black Sheep (anarcho-folk band), an English band formed by Julian Cope
- Black Sheep (duo), an American hip hop duo
- Black Sheep (metal band), a 1980s American band fronted by Willie Basse
- Black Sheep (rock band), a 1970s American band featuring Lou Gramm
- The Black Sheep Band, a Chicago-based punk supergroup that cut one album for charity
- The BlackSheeps, a Norwegian punk band
- Beowülf, originally Black Sheep, an American crossover thrash band

==== Albums ====
- Black Sheep (Cakes da Killa album), 2024
- Black Sheep (Julian Cope album), 2008
- Black Sheep (Nat & Alex Wolff album), 2011
- Black Sheep (Ra album), 2009
- Black Sheep, a 1996 album by Martin Sexton
- Black Sheep (EP), a 2019 EP by Dean Brody

==== Songs ====
- "Black Sheep" (John Anderson song), 1983
- "Black Sheep", a song by Sonata Arctica on their 2001 album Silence
- "Black Sheep", a song by Sneaker Pimps on their 2002 album Bloodsport
- "Black Sheep", a song by Nellie McKay in the 2005 film Rumor Has It...
- "Black Sheep", a song by August Burns Red on their 2007 album Messengers
- "Black Sheep", a song by Metric in the 2010 film Scott Pilgrim vs. the World
- "Black Sheep" (Gin Wigmore song), 2011
- "Black Sheep" (Dean Brody song), 2019
- "Black Sheep", a song by Palaye Royale on their 2020 album The Bastards
- "Black Sheep", a song by Crown the Empire on their 2023 album Dogma

=== Novels ===
- La Rabouilleuse (The Black Sheep), an 1842 novel by Honoré de Balzac
- "Die schwarzen Schafe" (translated as "Black Sheep"), a 1951 short story by Heinrich Böll
- Black Sheep (Heyer novel), a 1966 novel by Georgette Heyer
- Black Sheep (Hill novel), a 2013 novella by Susan Hill
- Black Sheep, a 2013 young adult novel by Na'ima B. Robert

=== Other arts and entertainment ===
- Black Sheep (play), a 2001 play by Lee Blessing
- Black Sheep (web series), a 2016 Indian web series
- "The Black Sheep", an episode of the 2018 Indian TV series Karenjit Kaur – The Untold Story of Sunny Leone
- Black Sheep, a history documentary series by Radio New Zealand

== Businesses ==
- Black Sheep Brewery, a British ale-maker
- Black Sheep Coffee, a British coffeehouse chain
- Black Sheep Productions, a Filipino motion picture company
- Cwmni y Ddafad Ddu Gymreig Cyfyngedig ("Welsh Black Sheep Company Limited"), which issued private banknotes between June 1969 and 1972
- The Black Sheep (restaurant), a Las Vegas restaurant that serves Vietnamese cuisine
- Black Sheep Restaurants, a Hong Kong–based hospitality group

== Military ==
- The Black Sheep, a name for VMA-214, a United States Marine Corps fighter squadron
- 8th Fighter Squadron, a former United States Air Force unit

== See also ==
- Abigail's Black Sheep, a pro wrestler in the Wyatt Family who wears a black sheep mask
- Black sheep effect, a concept in group dynamics
- "One Black Sheep", a song by Mat Kearney on his 2015 album Just Kids
- Black Sheeps, New Zealand-American horror comedy film by Jonathan King
- "Kuroi Hitsuji" (literally "Black sheep"), a single by Japanese idol group Keyakizaka46
- Kara Koyunlu or Black Sheep Turkomans, a 14th- and 15th-century Turkmen tribal federation
- Baa, Baa, Black Sheep (disambiguation)
