= B1a =

b1a may refer to:

- Rockwell B-1A Lancer, U.S. USAF bomber aircraft
- GSR Class B1a, a steam locomotive class
- B1A section, a WWII counterespionage unit in the Double-Cross System (XX System)
- B1a cells, a type of B1 cell
- B1A postal code, see List of postal codes of Canada: B

== See also ==
- BA1 (disambiguation)
- BA (disambiguation)
