= Lindsay Robertson (director) =

Scottish film director

- Education: University of Glasgow
- Occupation: Film director

Lindsay Robertson is a Scottish film and TV director and producer based in Hong Kong. She has won several national awards at the Asian Academy Creative Awards, including Best Director in 2023 and 2024.

== Education and career ==
Robertson earned an MA in film and television from the University of Glasgow. She moved from Scotland to Hong Kong in 2000 where her first role was as a producer for Craig Leeson at Ocean Vista Films. In 2011 she co-founded production company Mustard Collective and in 2016 she founded Moonlight Entertainment.

== Work ==
Year	Work	Role	Notes	Ref
2010	Unjust (Dir. Josefina Bergsten)	Co-writer, editor	Won Movies That Matter special jury award and Asian Human Rights Commission's Asian Human Rights Award for Creative Media in 2011	
2011	My life in a box	Director, co-writer, co-producer, editor	Short film starring Eugenia Yuan	
2012	Project Lotus: The Search for Blush	Co-producer, co-director	For Channel V	
2012	Asia's Next Top Model Cycle 1	Lead story producer	Presented by Nadya Hutagalung	
2013	The Apprentice Asia (Season 1)	Lead story producer	Hosted by Tony Fernandes	
2014	Wok Stars for MediaCorp Channel 5)	Lead story producer		
2015	The History Hustle for History Channel (Dir. Simon Yin)	Executive producer		
2018	Beat N Path for KIX (Dir. Simon Yin)	Writer, producer	Starring Lupe Fiasco	
2020	Frontline Fashion 4	Director	In conjunction with Redress Design Award	
2022	One small visit (Dir. Jo Chim)	Editor	Starring Gabriella Sundar Singh	
2023	Kung Food! Hong Kong’s Street Food Icons	Director, writer		
2024	On the edge of Chaos: Reimagining a Hong Kong Icon	Director	With Black Sheep Restaurants	

== Awards ==
Year	Nominee / work	Award	Result
2012	Best general entertainment programme for Project Lotus: The Search for Blush	17th Asian Television Awards	Nominated
2016	Best general entertainment programme for History Hustle	21st Asian Television Awards	Won
2020	Best lifestyle programme for Frontline Fashion Season 4	Asian Academy Creative Awards - national winner	Won
2020	Best short form content for Frontline Fashion Season 4	Asian Academy Creative Awards - national winner	Won
2023	Best director for Kung Food! Hong Kong’s Street Food Icons - Season 2	Asian Academy Creative Awards - national winner	Won
2024	Best branded programme for On the Edge of Chaos: Reimagining a Hong Kong icon	Asian Academy Creative Awards - national winner	Won
2024	Best director for On the Edge of Chaos: Reimagining a Hong Kong icon	Asian Academy Creative Awards - national winner	Won

== High&Dry ==
In 2007 Robertson and artist Jay Forster created multimedia exhibition High&Dry. It was held along Graham Street and celebrated Hong Kong's street markets, which were being threatened by redevelopment.
