= Dadieshui Waterfall =

Waterfall on the Bajiang River in Kunming, China

Dadieshui Waterfall 大叠水瀑布
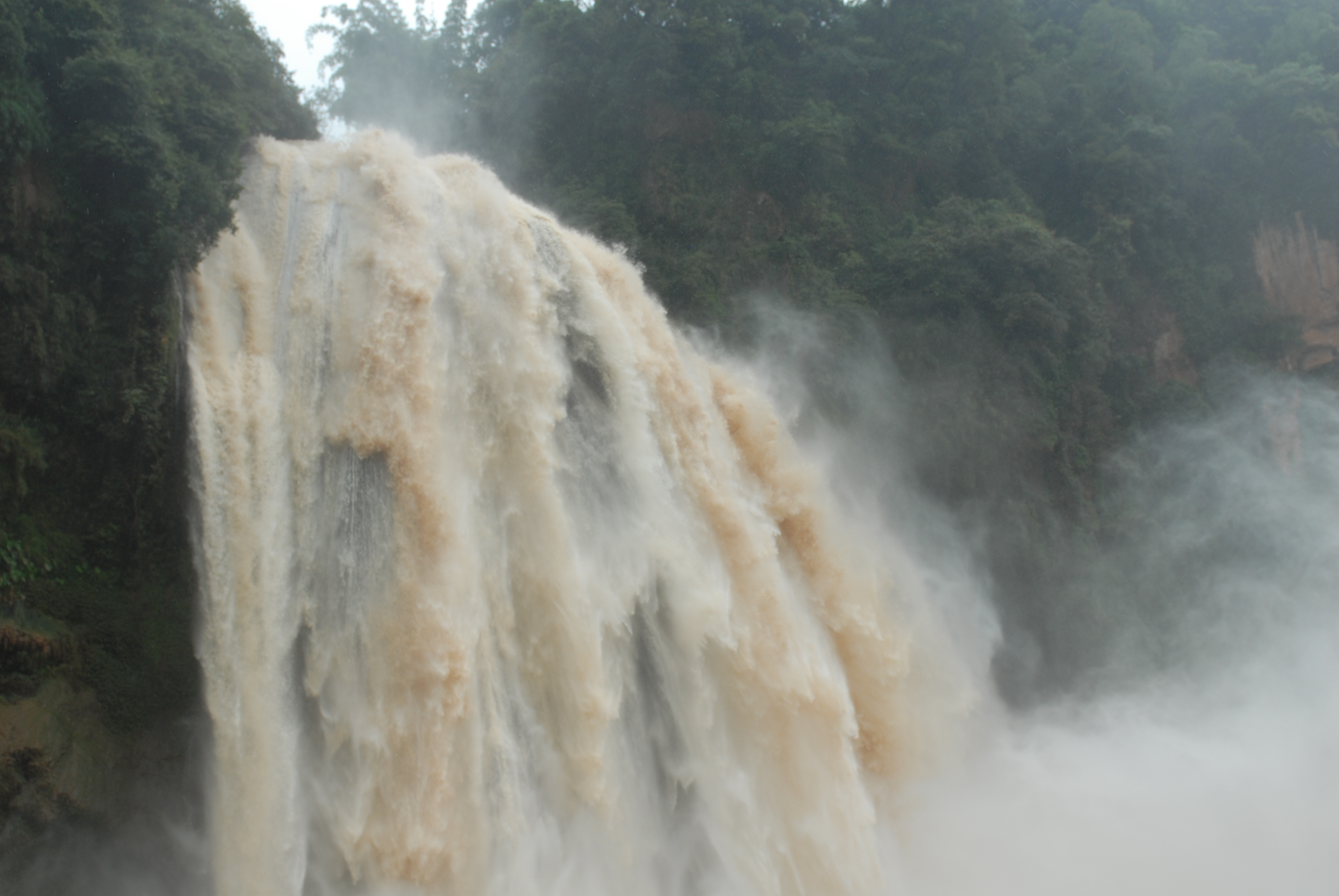
- Dadieshui Waterfall with sediment in rain season, water looked yellow
- Interactive map of Dadieshui Waterfall 大叠水瀑布
- Location: Shilin, Yunnan, China
- Coordinates: 24°39′54″N 103°11′59″E
- Elevation: 903.9 m (2,966 ft)
- Total height: 87.8 m (288 ft)
- Total width: 30 m (98 ft)
- Watercourse: Bajiang River

Dadieshui Waterfall (simplified Chinese: 大叠水瀑布; traditional Chinese: 大疊水瀑布; pinyin: Dàdiéshuǐ Pùbù), is a waterfall in China located on the Bajiang River (巴江) in Kunming, Yunnan province. It is 87.8 m (288 ft) high and 30 m (98 ft) wide. Dadieshui Waterfall is the largest waterfall in Yunnan, also is "the first waterfall on Pearl River".

The waterfall also is a viewfinder of the movie The Myth, a scene which Jackie Chan jump down to waterfall.
