= Eos Airlines =

Airline in the United States

eos
IATA	ICAO	Call sign
E0	ESS	NEW DAWN
- Founded: 2004; 22 years ago
- Ceased operations: April 27, 2008; 18 years ago
- Hubs: John F. Kennedy International Airport; London Stansted Airport
- Frequent-flyer program: Club48
- Fleet size: 6
- Destinations: 2
- Headquarters: Purchase, New York
- Key people: Jack L. Williams (CEO); Dave Pottruck (Chairman); Tom Martin (CFO); David Spurlock (Founder)
- Website: eosairlines.com

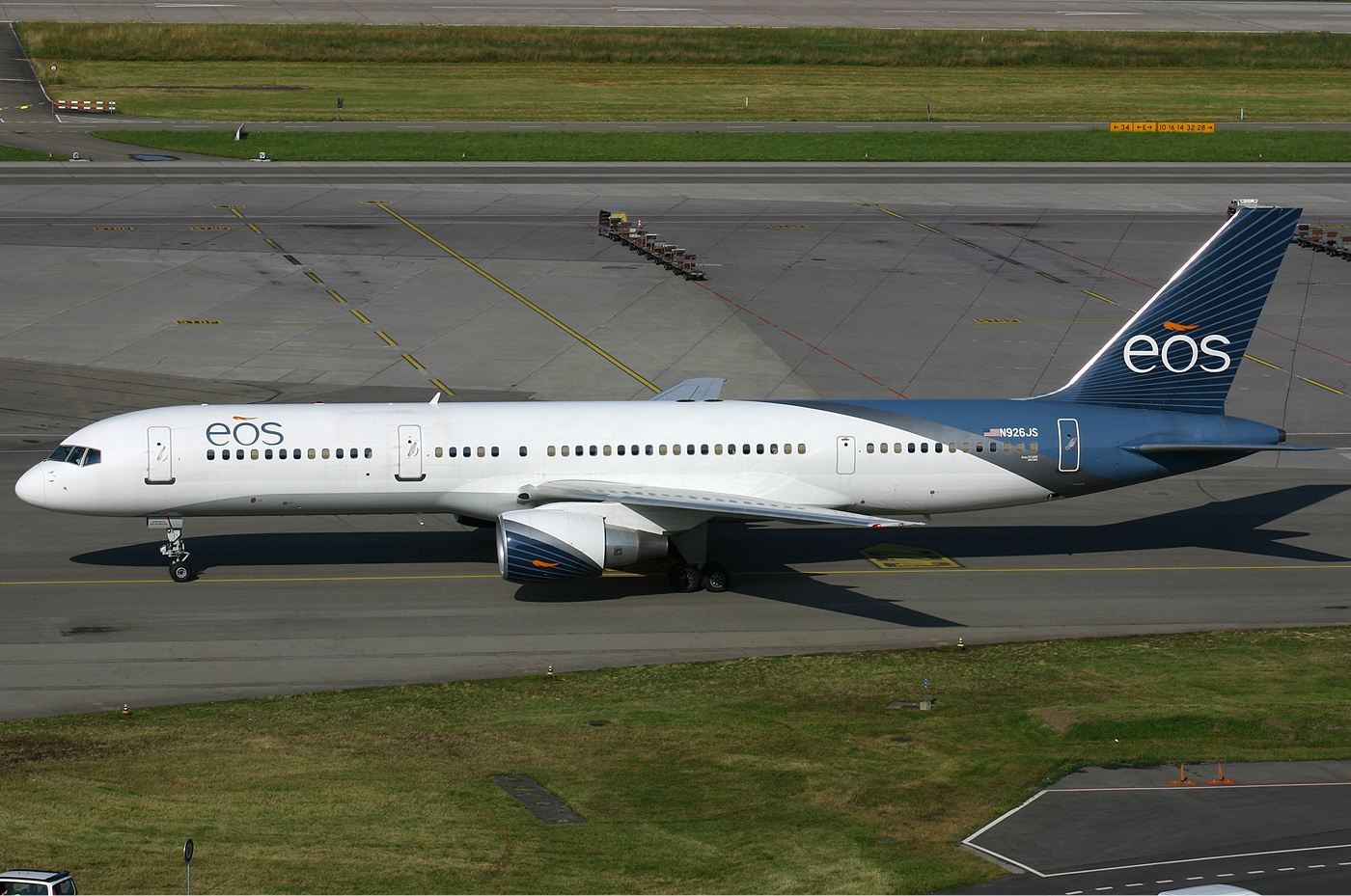
Eos Airlines Boeing 757-200, Zurich, 2006

Eos Airlines, Inc. was an American all-business class airline headquartered in Purchase, New York, with its flights from John F. Kennedy International Airport in New York. On 26 April 2008 Eos Airlines announced its plans to file bankruptcy on its web site, announcing it would cease passenger operations after April 27.

== History ==
The airline was founded in 2004 by Dave Spurlock, a former director of strategy at British Airways. The company was initially named Atlantic Express and changed its name to Eos in 2005. Eos began operations between New York and London Stansted on October 18, 2005. With the launch of its magazine eosCLASS in London on 13 March 2008, eos dropped 'Airlines' from its name and altered its slogan to become "eos - Uncrowded. Uncompromising. UNAIRLINE." This change was unveiled by Adam Komack, Chief Lifestyle Officer.

== Destinations ==
Eos Airlines operated a service between John F. Kennedy International Airport (JFK) and London Stansted Airport, with between two and four daily flights. On June 20, 2007, the airline stated that it ranked fourth amongst the most frequently scheduled airlines on the New York-London route.

In April 2007 the airline announced that routes from Stansted to Washington, D.C., Boston, Los Angeles, and two other destinations were set to begin within the next couple of years. It also had plans to begin flights from Miami to South America.

On October 18, 2007, Eos announced that it would begin flights from JFK to Paris, France, and from Newark International Airport to Stansted in 2008. The airline had not revealed details of the Paris flight except that it would have begun in the fall. The Stansted to Newark flights were to begin on May 5, 2008. Eos was also planning to begin flights from Stansted to Dubai on July 6, 2008.

According to the Eos website, the airline was planning on launching up to four new routes in 2008.

- United Arab Emirates
  - Dubai (Dubai International Airport)
- United Kingdom
  - London (London Stansted Airport)
- United States
  - New York City (John F. Kennedy International Airport)
  - Newark (Newark Liberty International Airport)

== Awards ==
- 2007 Long-Haul Business Airline of the Year (2007 Business Travel World Awards)
- World's Leading Business Class Only Airline 2007 - World Travel Awards
- Most Punctual Airline between London and New York 2006 & 2007
- Eos Seat: Product Design Award 2006

== Last flights ==
The last scheduled flights flown by Eos Airlines were on April 28, 2008 Flight 6 (8:30pm) from JFK to STN and on April 28, 2008 Flights 3 (1:00pm) and 7 (6:30pm) from STN to JFK. The final flight was a charter, flight 9805, which departed STN on the evening of April 30, arriving at JFK a few minutes before midnight.

== See also ==
- L'Avion
- Silverjet
- Maxjet
- La Compagnie
- List of defunct airlines of the United States
