= Flyjet =

Charter airline of the United Kingdom

IATA	ICAO	Call sign
Y7	FJE	FLY JET
- Founded: 2002
- Commenced operations: 2003
- Ceased operations: 2007
- Hubs: Manchester Airport, Newcastle International Airport
- Fleet size: 3 (2006)
- Headquarters: London Luton Airport, United Kingdom
- Website: http://www.fly-jet.com/

Flyjet was a charter airline based at London Luton Airport, United Kingdom. It operated from Manchester Airport and Newcastle Airport to Mediterranean basin holiday destinations, as well as to the Canary Islands,. The company held a United Kingdom Civil Aviation Authority Type A Operating Licence, and was permitted to carry passengers, cargo and mail on aircraft with 20 or more seats. Flyjet ceased operations from 31 October 2007.

== History ==
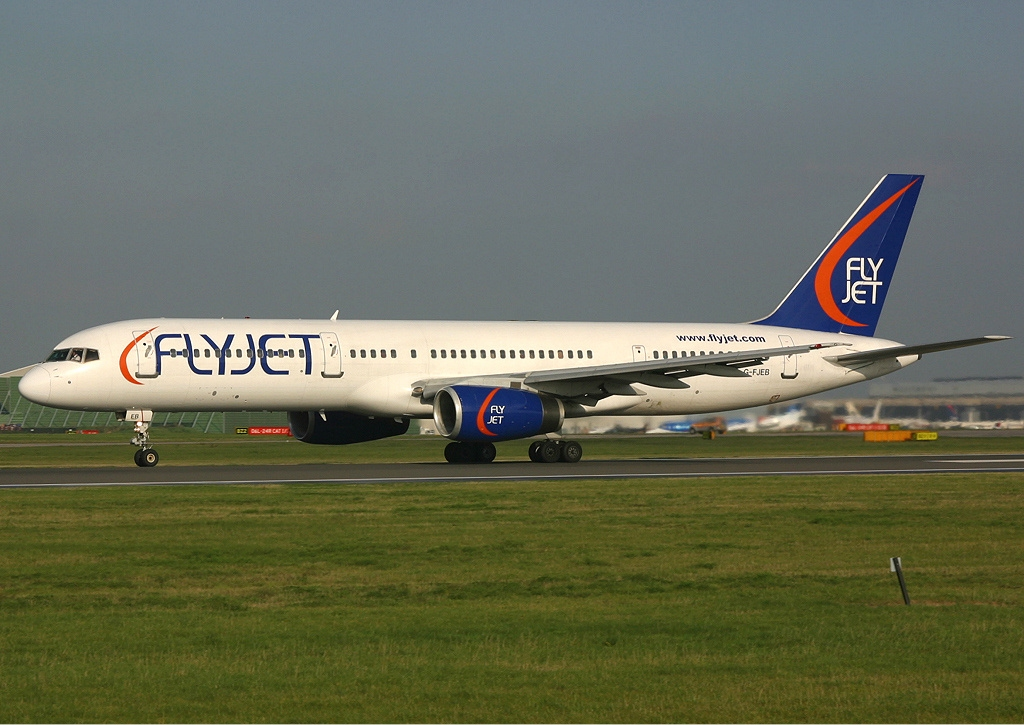
Boeing 757-200 at Manchester in 2005

The airline was established in 2002 and was owned by Mike Hawkins (49.9%) and Shaun Dewey (49.9%). It started operations in June of the following year. It operated from London Gatwick Airport, Newcastle International Airport and Manchester Ringway Airport. Silverjet Aviation, which is licensed for worldwide charter operations, acquired Flyjet in October 2006. The Flyjet London Gatwick base was then closed and head office and operations all relocated from London Gatwick Airport to London Luton Airport. Flyjet continued to operate under the Flyjet Charter brand from Newcastle and Manchester Airports, with the SilverJet scheduled brand flying from London Luton Airport. Newcastle and Manchester bases were closed in October 2007 and the two Boeing 757-200ERs were returned to the leasing company, with the Boeing 767-200ER G-FJEC being retained and operated by SilverJet. Flyjet had operated flights between RAF Brize Norton and RAF Akrotiri, Cyprus, on behalf of the Royal Air Force.

== Fleet ==
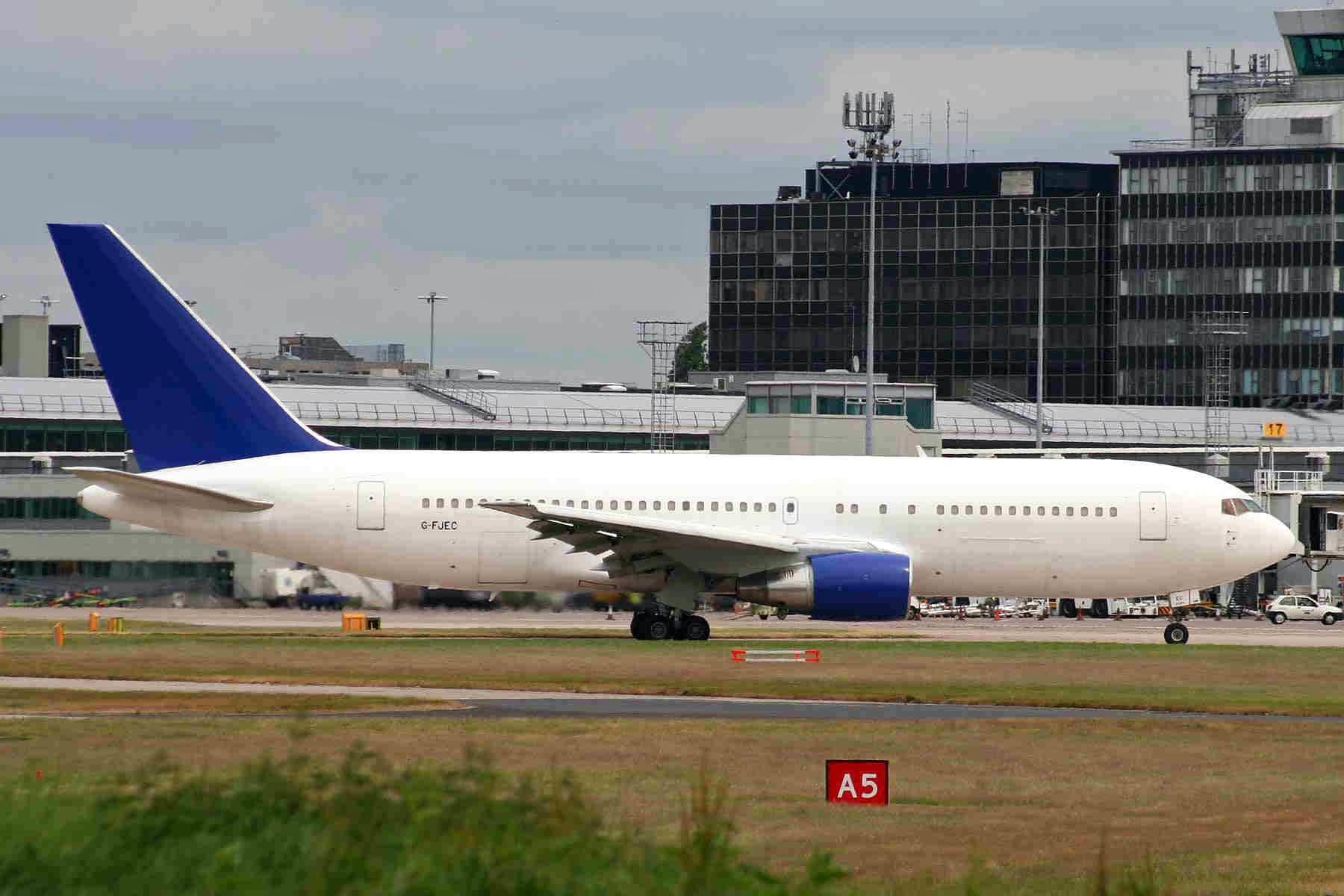
Boeing 767-200

The fleet consisted of the following aircraft (at January 2008):

- 2 x Boeing 757-200ER
- 3 x Boeing 767-200ER (operated on scheduled services as SilverJet)

== See also ==
- List of defunct airlines of the United Kingdom
