= Loch Bà =

Loch Bà may refer to the following lochs in Scotland:

- Loch Bà (Mull), on the Isle of Mull
- Loch Bà (Rannoch Moor), in the Highlands
