= MAXjet Airways =

American airline

MAXjet
IATA	ICAO	Call sign
MY	MXJ	MAX-JET
- Founded: 2003; 23 years ago
- Ceased operations: 24 December 2007; 18 years ago
- Hubs: London Stansted
- Frequent-flyer program: MAXflier
- Fleet size: 5
- Destinations: 4
- Parent company: MAXjet Airways, Inc
- Headquarters: Washington Dulles International Airport, Sterling, Virginia
- Key people: William D. Stockbridge, CEO
- Website: http://www.maxjet.com, http://www.maxjet.org

MAXjet Airways was an American, transatlantic, all-business class airline that operated between 2003 and 2007. Its headquarters were located on the grounds of Washington-Dulles International Airport, and in the Dulles area of Loudoun County, Virginia, United States.

MAXjet operated services to London Stansted Airport, United Kingdom from Las Vegas McCarran International Airport, Los Angeles International Airport, and John F. Kennedy International Airport, New York.

From the beginning, MAXjet Airways may have been compromised by a lack of economies of scale, having only a maximum of 5 aircraft at the height of its operations, although this is similar to other competing airlines in this class (EOS, SilverJet etc.). It offered passengers airport lounge access (flagship lounge at Stansted; shared, non-proprietary at JFK and LAX; not available in Las Vegas), premium complimentary meals and beverages and on-demand in-flight entertainment.

On 24 December 2007, the airline filed for Chapter 11 Bankruptcy and ceased operations. The airline confirmed that Eos Airlines was to accommodate passengers on their Stansted to JFK services.

== History ==
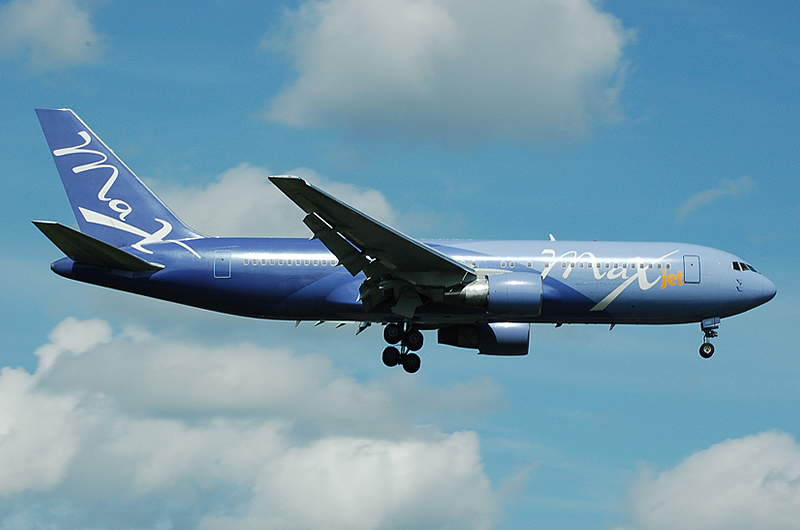
MAXjet Boeing 767-200 in the new livery

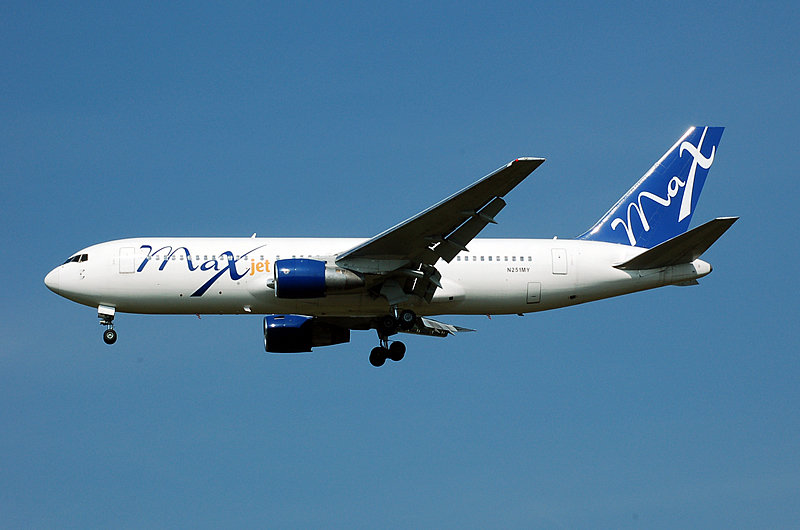
MAXjet Boeing 767-200 in Basic Colors

The airline was publicly traded on the London Stock Exchange Alternative Investment Market as "MAXJ". It operated its first service from New York to London on 1 November 2005. Founded in 2003, the airline was conceived as a transatlantic low-cost carrier that would code share with domestic low-cost carriers at Baltimore-Washington International Thurgood Marshall Airport. During its start-up phase, management expressed concern over the economics of applying the low cost carrier model to transatlantic routes and instead repositioned the airline as a premium all-business-class service. MAXjet's target market was premium economy and "savvy" business class passengers.

The success of MAXjet’s all-business-class service continued to grow as the company claimed load factors of 83.1% (June 2007) on its network from London Stansted.

As well as the scheduled routes, MAXjet’s luxury charter operations continued to grow with the acquisition of more aircraft. Some aircraft were planned to focus on the growing charter business as well as being used as support on the New York City, Los Angeles and Las Vegas scheduled routes. The airline’s luxury charter business, which experienced significant growth, transported groups to various destinations throughout Europe, the Caribbean and the USA. Charters included Stockholm to Las Vegas, and England to Washington, D.C., and Los Angeles including a charter for the 2006 U.S Ryder Cup team. The company had a strong customer base that included corporations, government entities and professional sports teams.

=== Suspension of MAXjet shares and filing for bankruptcy ===
On 7 December 2007, MAXjet suspended trading of its shares on AIM, pending clarification of their financial position.

An article in the Financial Times on 23 December 2007 reported that the company was in "last-ditch talks" to arrange a financial rescue package. However, the following morning the company announced on its website that it had filed for Chapter 11 bankruptcy. Passengers who had yet to travel were advised to seek a refund from the point of purchase. The company announced it had already begun to make alternative travel or accommodation arrangements for those left stranded.

On 24 December 2007, MAXjet announced that they permanently suspended all flight operations citing rising fuel costs, increased crew salaries, and other unforeseen costs. The airline purchased tickets to accommodate passengers on Eos Airlines, and Continental Airlines and Silverjet both made offers to accommodate stranded MAXjet passengers.

On March 25, 2008, MAXjet announced that operations will soon start again following an acquisition by NCA Sports Group to restart its operation as a charter service. However that failed in August 2008.

== Destinations ==
The following destinations were operated by MAXjet during its existence.

=== Europe ===
- United Kingdom
  - London (London Stansted Airport)

=== North America ===
- United States
  - California
    - Los Angeles (Los Angeles International Airport)
  - Nevada
    - Las Vegas (McCarran International Airport)
  - New York City
    - New York City (John F. Kennedy International Airport)
  - Washington, D.C.
    - Sterling, Virginia (Washington Dulles International Airport) - headquarters (service ended before MAXjet ceased operations)

== Fleet ==
The MAXjet Airways fleet consisted of the following aircraft as of December 2007:

- 1 Boeing 767-200
- 4 Boeing 767-200ER

MAXjet's aircraft were configured with either 92, 94, 100, or 102 seats depending on the individual aircraft, with an average fleet age of 18.2 years as of March 2007.

== In-flight services ==
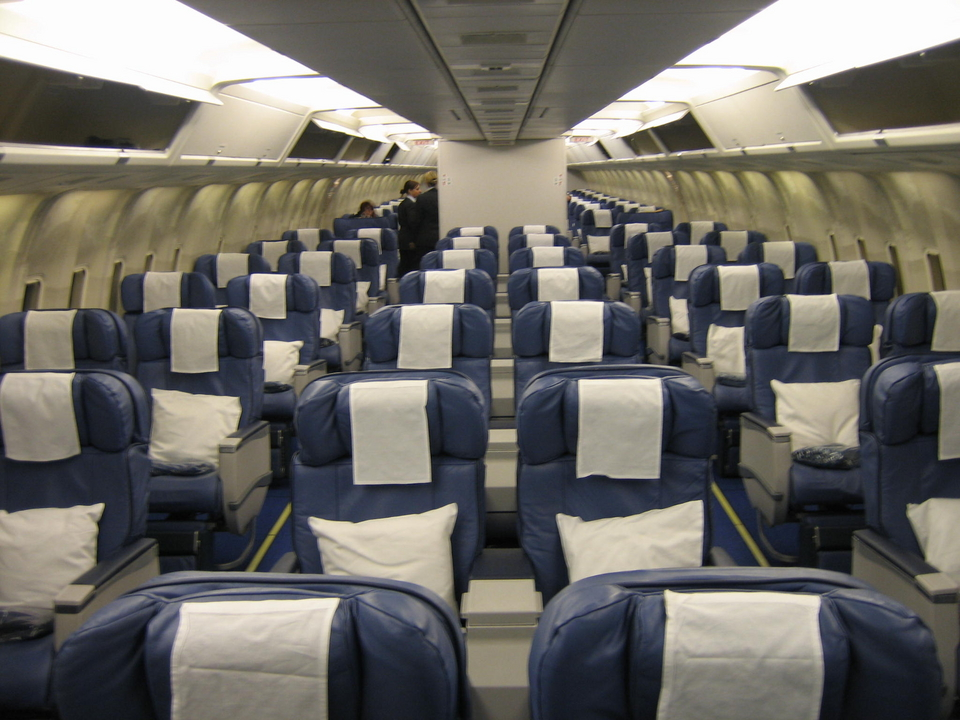
MAXjet cabin interior.

MAXjet aircraft were fitted with traditional leather business-class "deep-recline" cradle-seats with a 60-inch seat pitch (distance between a seat and the same point on the seat in front of it) and a 160-degree recline.

On-demand entertainment, which included 100 hours of movies, television programs and music videos as well as pure music audio content, was available via individual portable media players called "MAXplayers", which were provided on each flight. Although the seats were new, MAXjet aircraft had a relatively old style cabin fit, so the seats were not equipped with conventional built-in entertainment systems or in-flight A/C power ports.

The airline's catering used restaurant china, metal cutlery and stemmed glassware, and offered complimentary liquor, beer, champagne and a rotating wine selection.

== Awards ==
- Travel + Leisure Magazine's Top 10 International Airlines 2007 – 2nd place

== See also ==
- PrivatAir
- Eos Airlines
- Silverjet
- L'Avion (now OpenSkies after being purchased by British Airways)
- IndiGo
- La Compagnie (founded by the founder of L'Avion)
- List of defunct airlines of the United States
