= Silverjet =

British all-business class airline (2006–08)

IATA	ICAO	Call sign
Y7	SLR	SILVERJET
- Founded: 2006
- Commenced operations: 25 January 2007
- Ceased operations: 30 May 2008
- Hubs: London Luton Airport
- Fleet size: 3
- Destinations: 3
- Parent company: Silverjet Plc.
- Headquarters: Luton, Bedfordshire, England
- Key people: Peter Owen (Chairman); Lawrence Hunt (CEO)
- Website: flysilverjet.com

Silverjet was a British all-business class airline headquartered at London Luton Airport in Luton, Bedfordshire, England, that, prior to the suspension of operations on 30 May 2008, operated services to Newark Liberty International Airport and Dubai International Airport. A proposed rescue package fell through on 13 June when staff were laid off and it was announced that the airline's assets would be sold.

== History ==
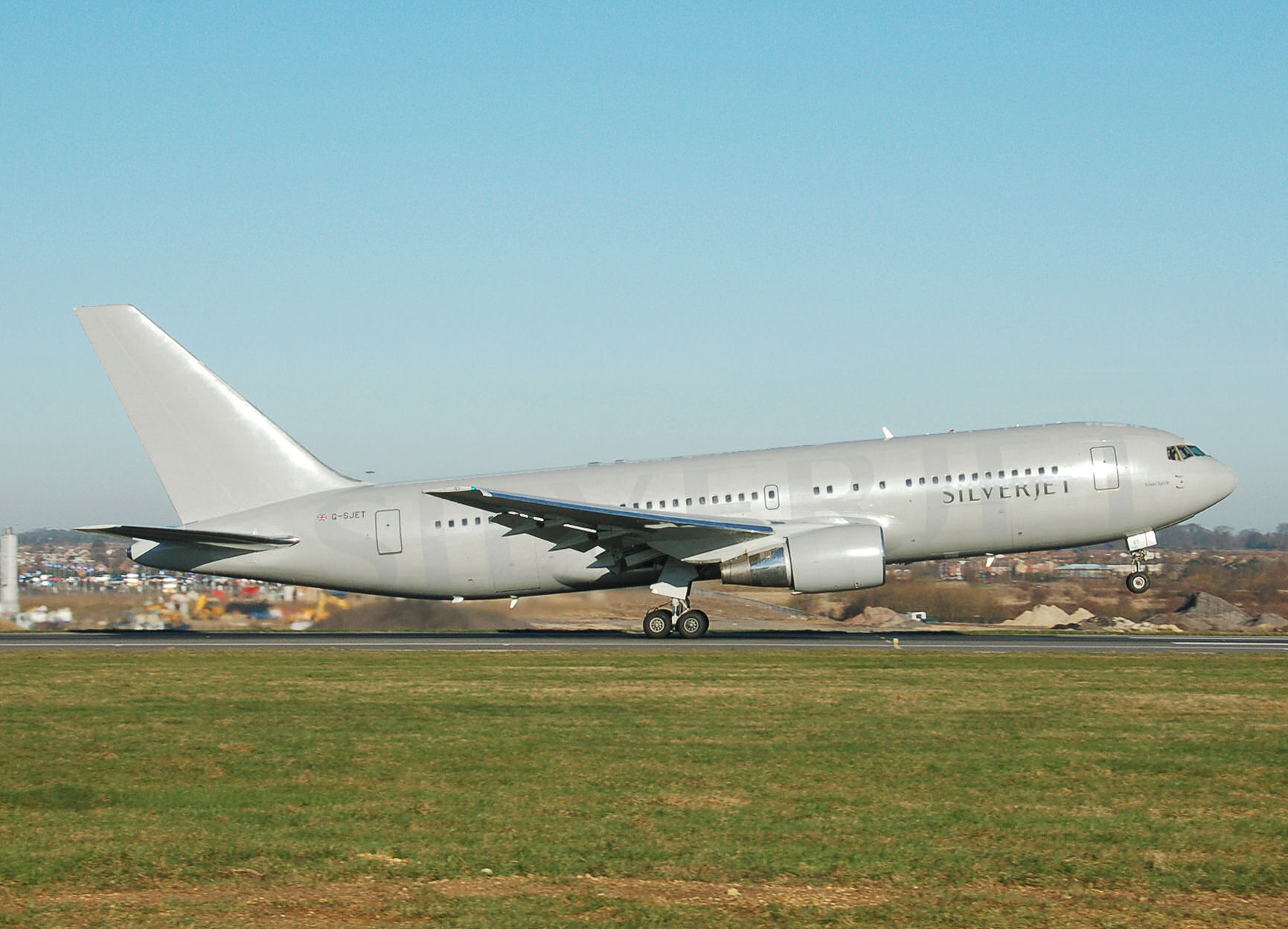
A Boeing 767-200ER taking off from London Luton Airport, England

Silverjet Aviation Ltd. was created in 2004 by Lawrence Hunt. Prior to launch, the airline, established in spring 2006, secured sufficient funding to begin trading on the AIM, a market operated by the London Stock Exchange, and joined the AIM on 12 May. The airline bought two Boeing 767-200 aircraft in August 2006 that were previously operated by Thomsonfly. These were delivered in March 2007 and October 2007 and were Silverjet's main aircraft. With the acquisition of British Charter Flyjet in October, Silverjet took ownership of their two Boeing 757 and one Boeing 767 aircraft. This also provided Silverjet with Flyjet's Air Operator's Certificate, Operating Licence and a worldwide Route Licence.

Silverjet's website, designed by Prospect, began taking passengers' bookings for flights on 12 October 2006, for a standard fare of £999. Silverjet's first scheduled flight between London Luton and Newark began on 25 January 2007, and a second daily service on this route was launched on 23 September 2007. Services from London Luton to Dubai International commenced on 18 November 2007, and the airline planned to launch other long-haul destinations in the future, but this expansion was halted because of Silverjet's financial troubles.

At the beginning of May 2008, Silverjet stated that they had arranged an $8.4 million loan facility from Viceroy Holdings, a Middle Eastern investor. However, the airline was unable to draw down $5 million that it needed urgently, and, on 23 May 2008, trading of Silverjet's shares was suspended on the AIM. Later, on 30 May 2008, a statement was released from Silverjet's CEO that stated Silverjet would cease operations and suspend all flights with immediate effect due to failing to secure funding. The last operating flight, SLR254, arrived at London Luton Airport from Dubai at 15:00GMT on the day of the announcement.

On 10 June 2008, it was announced that Ireland-based Kingplace would purchase Silverjet on behalf of unnamed private clients. However that deal fell through on 13 June, Silverjet went into liquidation and made all 420 staff redundant. An announcement by Lawrence Hunt, chief executive of Silverjet on 19 June 2008 dismissed rumours that Arabjet would keep the airline in business and stated that Silverjet's fleet would be permanently grounded and that the airline would not fly again.

== Carbon emissions ==
Silverjet claimed to be the world's first "carbon neutral" airline. From launch all ticket prices included a mandatory carbon offset contribution to be reinvested in climate-friendly projects. In October 2007, however, their offset scheme was altered to give customers the choice on whether to accept the recommended carbon offset after the United Kingdom doubled the Air Passenger Duty.

In an interview with the Financial Times on 25 January 2007, Lawrence Hunt said: "It is no use people just sitting around thinking about climate change and pretending it is someone else’s problem. That is what the airline business has done to date."

In January 2007, Silverjet was awarded by The Institute of Transport Management as "Environmentally Aware Airline 2007" in recognition of the stance the company had taken regarding carbon emissions.

== Destinations ==
^{[Base]}	Base

City	Nation	IATA	ICAO	Airport
Dubai	United Arab Emirates	DXB	OMDB	Dubai International Airport
London	United Kingdom	LTN	EGGW	London Luton Airport ^{[Base]}
Newark	United States	EWR	KEWR	Newark Liberty International Airport

Prior to the suspension of operations, Silverjet operated twice-daily flights between London Luton Airport and Newark Liberty International Airport, and a daily service between London Luton Airport and Dubai International Airport. Silverjet also operated cargo services between London and Newark that used the underfloor cargo capacity of their Boeing 767 passenger aircraft.

=== Private terminals ===
Silverjet was the only airline to offer a private passenger terminal at London Luton Airport. The airline also had a private check-in area at Newark Airport located in the Arrivals area and separated from the other check-in desks, and used the executive terminal at Dubai International Airport for arrivals and departures. Silverjet's private terminal at Luton and private check-in area at Newark also housed the airline's Silver Lounge, and like most airport lounges, offered food, drinks, seating and free internet access to Silverjet passengers.

== Fleet ==
Silverjet's fleet consisted of three Boeing 767-200(ER) aircraft.

== Awards ==
- Best Executive Transport - Esquire Man at The Top Awards 2007
- Best Airline 2007 - Sunday Times Travel Magazine Experts Awards 2007
- Winner Aviation Category - Condé Nast Traveller Innovation and Design Awards 2007
- Environmentally Aware Airline 2007 - The Institute of Transport Management 2007

== See also ==
- List of defunct airlines of the United Kingdom
- L'Avion
- Eos Airlines
- Maxjet
- La Compagnie
