= Bah humbug (disambiguation) =

"Bah humbug" is a catchphrase of Ebenezer Scrooge, a character in Charles Dickens's A Christmas Carol, declaring Christmas to be a fraud.

Bah humbug may also refer to:

== Television ==
- "Bah Humbug", an episode of TV series Casualty (series 31)
- "Bah, Humbug", an episode of WKRP in Cincinnati
- Bah, Humbug!, a TV film with James Earl Jones
- B.A.H. Humbug, a character in the 1978 Christmas TV special The Stingiest Man in Town
- "Bah Humbug-atti", a 2017 episode of TV series The Grand Tour
- Bah Humbug, a character in the 2007 comedy film The Perfect Holiday

== Music ==
- Bah Humbug, an album by Sleepy Rebels
- Bah Humbug, a 2008 EP by The Destructors

== Other uses ==
- Bah, Humbug!, a musical by Bill Francoeur

== See also ==
- Ba humbugi, a species of land snail
