= Ba (Javanese) =

Syllable in the Javanese script

ba
- ꦧ
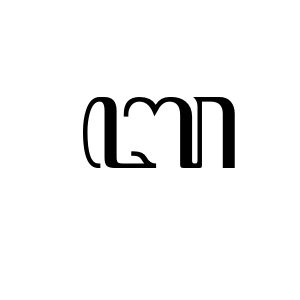
- Aksara nglegena

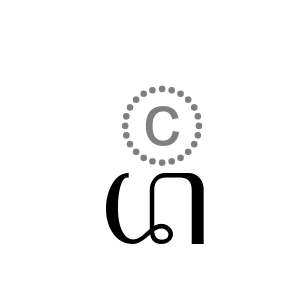
- Aksara pasangan

Usage
- Writing system: Javanese script
- Latin orthography: ba
- Sound values: [b]
- In Unicode: A9A7

ꦧ is a syllable in the Javanese script that represents the sounds /bɔ/, /ba/. It is transliterated into Latin as "ba" and sometimes in Indonesian orthography as "bo". It has another form (pasangan), ◌꧀ꦧ, but is represented by a single Unicode code point, U+A9A7.

== Pasangan ==
Its pasangan form ◌꧀ꦧ, is located on the bottom side of the previous syllable. For example, ꦲꦤꦏ꧀ꦧꦧꦶ - anak babi (piglet).

== Murda ==
ꦧ does have a murda, which is ꦨ.

ꦧ with a cerek (ꦆ) is called I, while ꦇ is called long I.

== Glyphs ==
Nglegena forms				Pasangan forms			
ꦧ ba	ꦧꦃ bah	ꦧꦁ bang	ꦧꦂ bar	◌꧀ꦧ -ba	◌꧀ꦧꦃ -bah	◌꧀ꦧꦁ -bang	◌꧀ꦧꦂ -bar
ꦧꦺ be	ꦧꦺꦃ beh	ꦧꦺꦁ beng	ꦧꦺꦂ ber	◌꧀ꦧꦺ -be	◌꧀ꦧꦺꦃ -beh	◌꧀ꦧꦺꦁ -beng	◌꧀ꦧꦺꦂ -ber
ꦧꦼ bê	ꦧꦼꦃ bêh	ꦧꦼꦁ bêng	ꦧꦼꦂ bêr	◌꧀ꦧꦼ -bê	◌꧀ꦧꦼꦃ -bêh	◌꧀ꦧꦼꦁ -bêng	◌꧀ꦧꦼꦂ -bêr
ꦧꦶ bi	ꦧꦶꦃ bih	ꦧꦶꦁ bing	ꦧꦶꦂ bir	◌꧀ꦧꦶ -bi	◌꧀ꦧꦶꦃ -bih	◌꧀ꦧꦶꦁ -bing	◌꧀ꦧꦶꦂ -bir
ꦧꦺꦴ bo	ꦧꦺꦴꦃ boh	ꦧꦺꦴꦁ bong	ꦧꦺꦴꦂ bor	◌꧀ꦧꦺꦴ -bo	◌꧀ꦧꦺꦴꦃ -boh	◌꧀ꦧꦺꦴꦁ -bong	◌꧀ꦧꦺꦴꦂ -bor
ꦧꦸ bu	ꦧꦸꦃ buh	ꦧꦸꦁ bung	ꦧꦸꦂ bur	◌꧀ꦧꦸ -bu	◌꧀ꦧꦸꦃ -buh	◌꧀ꦧꦸꦁ -bung	◌꧀ꦧꦸꦂ -bur
ꦧꦿ bra	ꦧꦿꦃ brah	ꦧꦿꦁ brang	ꦧꦿꦂ brar	◌꧀ꦧꦿ -bra	◌꧀ꦧꦿꦃ -brah	◌꧀ꦧꦿꦁ -brang	◌꧀ꦧꦿꦂ -brar
ꦧꦿꦺ bre	ꦧꦿꦺꦃ breh	ꦧꦿꦺꦁ breng	ꦧꦿꦺꦂ brer	◌꧀ꦧꦿꦺ -bre	◌꧀ꦧꦿꦺꦃ -breh	◌꧀ꦧꦿꦺꦁ -breng	◌꧀ꦧꦿꦺꦂ -brer
ꦧꦽ brê	ꦧꦽꦃ brêh	ꦧꦽꦁ brêng	ꦧꦽꦂ brêr	◌꧀ꦧꦽ -brê	◌꧀ꦧꦽꦃ -brêh	◌꧀ꦧꦽꦁ -brêng	◌꧀ꦧꦽꦂ -brêr
ꦧꦿꦶ bri	ꦧꦿꦶꦃ brih	ꦧꦿꦶꦁ bring	ꦧꦿꦶꦂ brir	◌꧀ꦧꦿꦶ -bri	◌꧀ꦧꦿꦶꦃ -brih	◌꧀ꦧꦿꦶꦁ -bring	◌꧀ꦧꦿꦶꦂ -brir
ꦧꦿꦺꦴ bro	ꦧꦿꦺꦴꦃ broh	ꦧꦿꦺꦴꦁ brong	ꦧꦿꦺꦴꦂ bror	◌꧀ꦧꦿꦺꦴ -bro	◌꧀ꦧꦿꦺꦴꦃ -broh	◌꧀ꦧꦿꦺꦴꦁ -brong	◌꧀ꦧꦿꦺꦴꦂ -bror
ꦧꦿꦸ bru	ꦧꦿꦸꦃ bruh	ꦧꦿꦸꦁ brung	ꦧꦿꦸꦂ brur	◌꧀ꦧꦿꦸ -bru	◌꧀ꦧꦿꦸꦃ -bruh	◌꧀ꦧꦿꦸꦁ -brung	◌꧀ꦧꦿꦸꦂ -brur
ꦧꦾ bya	ꦧꦾꦃ byah	ꦧꦾꦁ byang	ꦧꦾꦂ byar	◌꧀ꦧꦾ -bya	◌꧀ꦧꦾꦃ -byah	◌꧀ꦧꦾꦁ -byang	◌꧀ꦧꦾꦂ -byar
ꦧꦾꦺ bye	ꦧꦾꦺꦃ byeh	ꦧꦾꦺꦁ byeng	ꦧꦾꦺꦂ byer	◌꧀ꦧꦾꦺ -bye	◌꧀ꦧꦾꦺꦃ -byeh	◌꧀ꦧꦾꦺꦁ -byeng	◌꧀ꦧꦾꦺꦂ -byer
ꦧꦾꦼ byê	ꦧꦾꦼꦃ byêh	ꦧꦾꦼꦁ byêng	ꦧꦾꦼꦂ byêr	◌꧀ꦧꦾꦼ -byê	◌꧀ꦧꦾꦼꦃ -byêh	◌꧀ꦧꦾꦼꦁ -byêng	◌꧀ꦧꦾꦼꦂ -byêr
ꦧꦾꦶ byi	ꦧꦾꦶꦃ byih	ꦧꦾꦶꦁ bying	ꦧꦾꦶꦂ byir	◌꧀ꦧꦾꦶ -byi	◌꧀ꦧꦾꦶꦃ -byih	◌꧀ꦧꦾꦶꦁ -bying	◌꧀ꦧꦾꦶꦂ -byir
ꦧꦾꦺꦴ byo	ꦧꦾꦺꦴꦃ byoh	ꦧꦾꦺꦴꦁ byong	ꦧꦾꦺꦴꦂ byor	◌꧀ꦧꦾꦺꦴ -byo	◌꧀ꦧꦾꦺꦴꦃ -byoh	◌꧀ꦧꦾꦺꦴꦁ -byong	◌꧀ꦧꦾꦺꦴꦂ -byor
ꦧꦾꦸ byu	ꦧꦾꦸꦃ byuh	ꦧꦾꦸꦁ byung	ꦧꦾꦸꦂ byur	◌꧀ꦧꦾꦸ -byu	◌꧀ꦧꦾꦸꦃ -byuh	◌꧀ꦧꦾꦸꦁ -byung	◌꧀ꦧꦾꦸꦂ -byur

== Unicode block ==
Javanese script was added to the Unicode Standard in October 2009, with the release of version 5.2.

Javanese^{[1]}^{[2]} Official Unicode Consortium code chart (PDF)
	0	1	2	3	4	5	6	7	8	9	A	B	C	D	E	F
U+A98x	ꦀ	ꦁ	ꦂ	ꦃ	ꦄ	ꦅ	ꦆ	ꦇ	ꦈ	ꦉ	ꦊ	ꦋ	ꦌ	ꦍ	ꦎ	ꦏ
U+A99x	ꦐ	ꦑ	ꦒ	ꦓ	ꦔ	ꦕ	ꦖ	ꦗ	ꦘ	ꦙ	ꦚ	ꦛ	ꦜ	ꦝ	ꦞ	ꦟ
U+A9Ax	ꦠ	ꦡ	ꦢ	ꦣ	ꦤ	ꦥ	ꦦ	ꦧ	ꦨ	ꦩ	ꦪ	ꦫ	ꦬ	ꦭ	ꦮ	ꦯ
U+A9Bx	ꦰ	ꦱ	ꦲ	꦳	ꦴ	ꦵ	ꦶ	ꦷ	ꦸ	ꦹ	ꦺ	ꦻ	ꦼ	ꦽ	ꦾ	ꦿ
U+A9Cx	꧀	꧁	꧂	꧃	꧄	꧅	꧆	꧇	꧈	꧉	꧊	꧋	꧌	꧍		ꧏ
U+A9Dx	꧐	꧑	꧒	꧓	꧔	꧕	꧖	꧗	꧘	꧙					꧞	꧟
Notes 1.As of Unicode version 17.0 2.Grey areas indicate non-assigned code points
