= Baa, Baa, Black Sheep (disambiguation) =

Baa, Baa, Black Sheep is an English nursery rhyme.

Baa Baa Black Sheep may refer to:

- "Baa Baa, Black Sheep" (short story), an 1888 short story by Rudyard Kipling
- Baa, Baa, Black Sheep, an opera by Michael Berkeley based on Kipling's story and The Jungle Book
- Baa Baa Black Sheep, the autobiography of Pappy Boyington
- Baa Baa Black Sheep (TV series), a 1970s television series based on the autobiography of Pappy Boyington
- "Baa Baa Blacksheep", a song by Harry Nilsson under his pseudonyme "Bo Pete"
- Baa Baaa Black Sheep (film), a 2018 Indian film
- Baba Black Sheep (2023 film), an Indian film

== See also ==
- Three Bags Full, a 2005 novel by Leonie Swann
- Black Sheep (disambiguation)
- Sheep § Vocalisations
