= Institute of Transport Management =

The Institute of Transport Management is a non-profit organisation founded in England in 1977 to aid, oversee and reform the standards in the transport industry. Based in London, with a production facility in County Galway, Ireland, the organisation has a Europe-wide scope.

The institute's stated objectives are among others:

- To promote academic achievement, training and professionalism within the transport and logistics industry.
- To monitor and improve standards through ongoing research and communications programs.
- To award industry members for significant achievements and contributions in the development of transport solutions.

Its principal activity has been the distribution of awards to companies, nominally those with innovative transport products and services. The companies nominate themselves or others for these awards, and after a period of independent research, a short list is compiled naming the winners. A Lifetime Achievement award is also given to a person who distinguishes themselves throughout their career and achievements. Not all categories are filled from year to year due to this application process.

== History ==
Established in 1977, The Institute of Transport Management, also known as ITM, was the first to award companies and individuals for their effort in the transport industry in Europe. SME's, multinationals and other supporting industries have received numerous awards since the Institutes establishment. Through the decades and as a result of incredible growth in the industry, the Institute of Transport Management had increased its award categories.

In 2001, Dealers Choice Award was introduced to reflect the opinions of the automotive industry through their interaction with products and customers. Those taking part in the nominations are not allowed to vote for their own company and must be nominated by other individuals.

In May 2014, the institute announced that it is restructuring the company by moving its headquarters to London and opening a production facility in Ireland. The process started in 2013 where the Institute focused on updating their database and fostering new links around the world so that they are up to date on the most current research prior to the 2014 re-launch. The re-branding of the companies website from ITMawards to ITM World is an enlargement strategy employed to give the institute a worldwide presence in the evolving transport industry and revive the long-standing achievement of the international awards body.

By October 2014, ITM hoped to relaunch its exclusive online publication, The Transport Journal. The quarterly research journal reports into all the industry sectors and looks at future innovations in the transport industries.

== Categories ==
- Aviation
- Automotive
- Maritime
- Rail Transport
- Supporting Industries
- Logistics
- IT and Communications
- Environmental
- Aftermarket
- Dealers Choice

== Nomination Process ==
- Companies, organisations and individuals that meet the awards criteria under each respective category are invited to participate in the nomination process.
- Selected companies submit any additional statements or documents that they feel may be important to the nomination process.
- Pre-assessment process of entries is undertaken by Institutes research team against strict quality criteria.
- Nominees for each category are notified and published on the ITM awards site.
- The chosen members of the Award committee, which is made up of Institutes members, approves nominations and scores them according to category criteria.
- Category winners and the overall winners are notified and announced to the Transport Media.

== Some of the Past Winners ==
- Swissport, Global Aviation Ground Services Company 2012
- Evolution-Time Critical, Emergency Logistics Specialist of the Year, 2012
- GEFCO, European Logistics Company 2012 and UK Automotive Logistics Company 2012
- Jaama Ltd, Fleet Software Company of the Year 2012
- GMAC, Best Auto Finance Company 2012
- Autologic Diagnostic Ltd. Best Automotive Diagnostic Systems 2011
- Exide, Best Automotive Battery Range in 2011
- SMA Group,'Best Independent Vehicle Remarketing Company 2010
- Nissan, Van of the Year 2010, NV200
- FedEx Express, Best Global Cargo Hub 2010 award for its Memphis World Hub
- TouchStar Technologies, Best Mobile Computing Specialist 1999

== Membership ==
The Institute of Transport Management has nearly 18,000 members from across the globe. The members are from the transport industry and affiliating companies who have a say in the award process, with some of them being selected to be part of the Award Committee itself. The Institute hopes to increase its membership to over 20,000 by 2015.
