= Airbus A318 =

Airliner, part of the A320 family

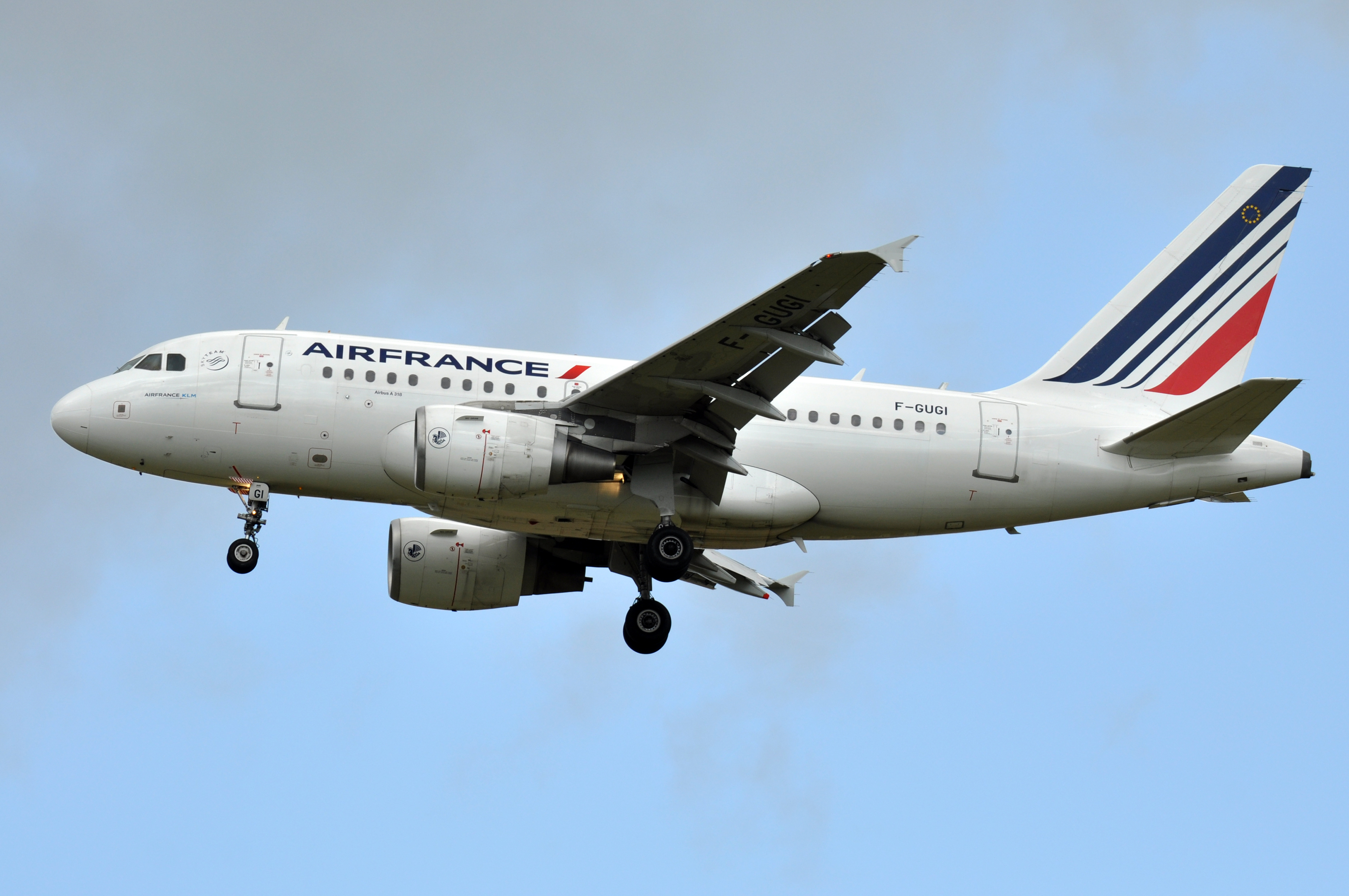
- An Air France Airbus A318 (2019), its largest ever and only remaining passenger operator

General information
- Role: Narrow-body airliner
- National origin: Multi-national (Note: Final assembly in Germany.)
- Manufacturer: Airbus
- Status: In limited service
- Primary users: Air France: Frontier Airlines (historical); LATAM Airlines (historical); Mexicana de Aviación (historical); Avianca Brasil (historical)
- Number built: 80

History
- Manufactured: 2001–2013
- Introduction date: 2003 with Frontier Airlines
- First flight: 15 January 2002; 24 years ago
- In service: 2003–present
- Developed from: Airbus A319
- Successors: Airbus A220 (market segment)

The Airbus A318, nicknamed the Baby Bus, is the smallest and least numerous variant airliner of the Airbus A320 family. The A318 carries 32 to 132 passengers and has a maximum range of 5,750 kilometres (3,100 nautical miles; 3,570 miles). Final assembly of the aircraft took place in Hamburg, Germany. It is intended primarily for short-range service.

The aircraft shares a common type rating with all other Airbus A320 family variants, allowing pilots to fly all versions of the aircraft without the need for further training. It is the largest commercial aircraft certified by the European Aviation Safety Agency for steep approach operations, behind the Airbus A220, allowing flights at airports such as London City.

The A318 entered service in July 2003 with Frontier Airlines. Relative to other Airbus A320 family variants, it sold in small numbers with total orders for 80 aircraft placed. The type is no longer listed for sale, having been supplanted by the A220 narrowbody. Air France is the last remaining commercial airline operator of the Airbus A318, having historically been its largest operator. There have been no reports of accidents involving the type.

== Development ==
=== Background ===
The first member of the A320 aircraft family was the A320, which had its maiden flight on 22 February 1987 after the program was launched in March 1984. The family was soon extended to include the stretched A321 (first delivery 1994), the shortened A319 (first delivery 1996), and the further shortened A318 (first delivery 2003). The A320 family pioneered the use in commercial aircraft of digital fly-by-wire flight control systems, as well as side stick controls.

The Airbus A318 project had its origins in the collaboration among Chinese, Singaporean and European manufacturers. In May 1997, during the visit of French President Jacques Chirac to China, Aviation Industries of China (AVIC), Singapore Technologies Aerospace (STAe), Airbus and Alenia signed a framework agreement that outlined the development of aircraft in the 100-seat range. The AE31X, as it was tentatively dubbed, besides being a global industrial programme would have significantly deepened Sino-European commercial ties. With development costs estimated to be upwards of $2 billion, AVIC would have a 46 percent stake in the project, STAe 15 percent, and Airbus Industrie Asia 39 percent, the latter of which comprised Airbus and Alenia. Final assembly would have taken place in China.

The project never went past the exploratory phase. It comprised two clean-sheet designs – the AE316 and the AE317. The AE316 would have had a length of 31.3 metres (102 ft 8 in), and the AE317, 34.5 m (113 ft 2 in). The standard versions of both variants had a maximum take-off weight of 49.9 tonnes (110,000 lb) for the smaller version and 54.2 t (119,000 lb) for the AE317, and would have been powered by either BMW Rolls-Royce, CFM International, or Pratt & Whitney turbofan engines. Range was settled at 3,700 kilometres (2,000 nmi; 2,300 mi) for both standard variants, although there was a higher-gross weight version which had greater range and engine power. The AE316 and AE317 would have seated a maximum of 105 and 125 passengers in five-abreast seating, respectively. Both would share a flight deck and fly-by-wire flight control system similar to that of the A320 family.

Market research conducted during 1997 revealed that airlines wanted a smaller aircraft in the 70–80-seat range. As the project proceeded, there were increasing disagreements between the Chinese side and Airbus. China wanted a larger aircraft than originally envisioned. In addition, there were difficulties arising out of negotiations about technology transfer and production workshare, and a weak business case. STAe, having previously expressed doubts about returns on the project, in 1998 withdrew from the project out of the failure between AIA and AVIC to reach an agreement; Airbus and AVIC would cancel the project in July that year. The A318 is believed to have emerged from the AE31X project though an Airbus-only project, named the A319M5 in March 1998, began before the AE31X cancellation.

=== Design phase ===
The internal corporate designation, A319M5, was used as early as March 1998, as an A319 derivative with fuselage shortening of 0.79 metres (2 ft 7 in) ahead of the wing and 1.6 m (5 ft 3 in) behind. The final proposal was for an aircraft seating 107 passengers in a two-class layout with a range of 3,350 kilometres (1,810 nmi; 2,080 mi). The aircraft's production took advantage of laser welding, eliminating the necessity for heavy rivets and bolts.

During the design process, the A318 encountered several problems. The first one was the decline in demand for new aircraft following the September 11 attacks. Another was the new Pratt & Whitney turbofan engines, which burned more fuel than expected. By the time CFM International (CFM) had a more efficient engine ready for market, many A318 customers had already backed out, including Air China and British Airways. America West Airlines, which had selected the Pratt & Whitney engines, amended its A318 orders, opting instead for A319 or A320 aircraft. Trans World Airlines cancelled a significant order for fifty A318s after being acquired by American Airlines, which did not operate any A320 family aircraft at the time (although neither did TWA when the order was originally placed). While Airbus was hoping to market the A318 as a regional jet alternative, laws in both the U.S. and Europe have kept it in the same class as larger aircraft for calculating charges such as landing fees, limiting the type's market potential.

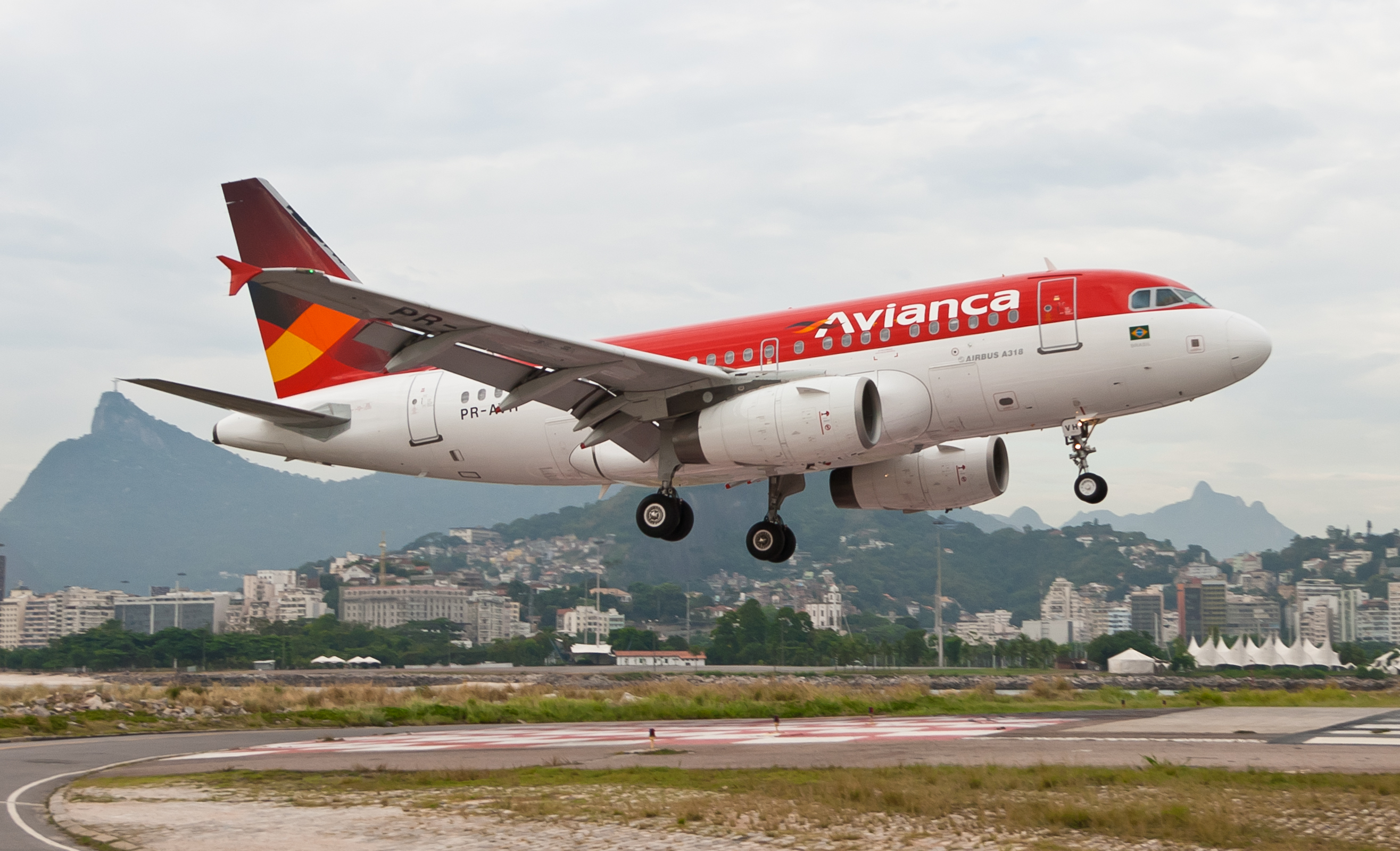
An Avianca A318, powered by PW6000 engines

The aircraft is powered by two CFM56-5 or Pratt & Whitney PW6000 engines with maximum thrust ratings of between 96 and 106 kilonewtons (21,600 and 23,800 lbf). Launch customers Frontier Airlines and Air France took deliveries in 2003, with Frontier receiving its aircraft in July of that year. The list price of an A318 ranges from $56 to $62 million, and operating costs are between $2,500 and $3,000 for each flight hour.

Orders for the A318 have been relatively slow, but slightly better than for its direct competitor the Boeing 737-600. By 30 September 2017, Airbus had received 80 orders for this model compared to 69 for the 737-600. The sales pace has been influenced by the strong sales of the Bombardier CRJ900 and Embraer E-Jet family. The biggest A318 customers as of 30 September 2017 were governments, executive and private jets (20), Air France (18), Avianca Holdings (15), lessor GE Capital Aviation Services (12) and Frontier Airlines (9).

=== Further developments ===
On 10 November 2005 Airbus announced the A318 Elite. The Airbus A318 Elite is aimed at the medium-range market for flights of up to 4,000-nautical-mile (7,400 km; 4,600 mi) range, with a choice of two cabin layouts seating up to 18 passengers, and powered by CFM engines. Comlux Aviation became the launch customer by ordering three A318 Elite aircraft.

In September 2010, Airbus confirmed that from 2013 the Airbus A318 would become available with Sharklets, wingtip devices which reduce lift-induced drag and improve efficiency through reduced fuel consumption. The optional devices, which will also be available on other Airbus A320 family models and are manufactured by Korean Air Aerospace Division, will increase the range of the aircraft to 5,930 kilometres (3,200 nmi; 3,680 mi) – an increase of 185 km (100 nmi; 115 mi) over a standard A318 with 107 seats in a two-class configuration.

When Airbus announced its re-engined A320neo family, the A318 was the only variant that did not have a new engine option. However, Airbus said that an A318neo could be developed in the future should demand arise.

== Design ==
The Airbus A318 is a small commercial, narrow-body (single-aisle) aircraft with a retractable tricycle landing gear and is powered by two wing pylon-mounted turbofan engines. Two suppliers, namely CFM International with the CFM56-5B engine and Pratt & Whitney with the PW6000 engine, provide turbofan engines for the A318. It is a low-wing cantilever monoplane with a conventional tail unit having a single vertical stabilizer and rudder.

Overall, the A318 is over six metres shorter and around 3 t (6,600 lb) lighter than the A320. To compensate for the reduced moment arm, it has a larger vertical stabiliser. While initial concepts depicted the aircraft with a Boeing 737 style dorsal fin extension, the final design incorporated a fin tip extension, making it 75 centimetres (30 in) taller than the other A320 variants. Pilots who are trained on the other variants may fly the A318 with no further certification, since it features a common flight deck and the same type rating as its sister aircraft. The A318 is also referred to as the A318-100.

The A318 is available with a variety of different maximum take-off weights (MTOW) ranging from a 59 tonnes (130,000 lb), 2,750 kilometres (1,480 nmi; 1,710 mi) base model to a 68 t (150,000 lb), 6,000 km (3,200 nmi; 3,700 mi) version. When equipped with CFM56-5B8/P engines, the A318 is available with a 56 or 68 t (123,000 or 150,000 lb) MTOW. When equipped with CFM56-5B9/P engines, the A318 is available with a 59 or 68 t (130,000 or 150,000 lb) MTOW. The lower MTOW enables it to operate regional routes economically while sacrificing range and the higher MTOW allows it to complement other members of the A320 family on marginal routes. The lighter weight of the A318 gives it an operating range 10% greater than the A320, allowing it to serve some routes that the A320 would be unable to: London – New York, Perth–Auckland and Singapore–Tokyo, for instance. Its main use for airlines, however, is on short, low-density hops between medium-sized cities.

=== Steep approach capability ===
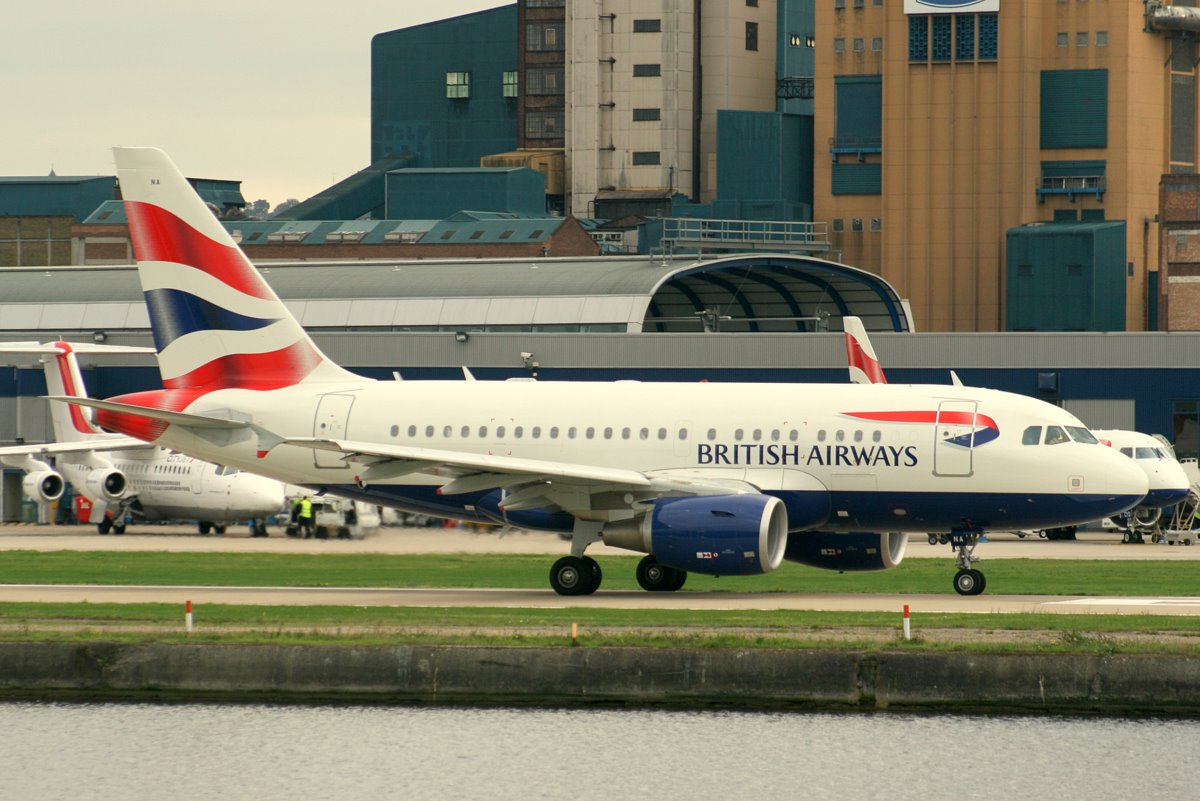
British Airways Airbus A318 at London City Airport

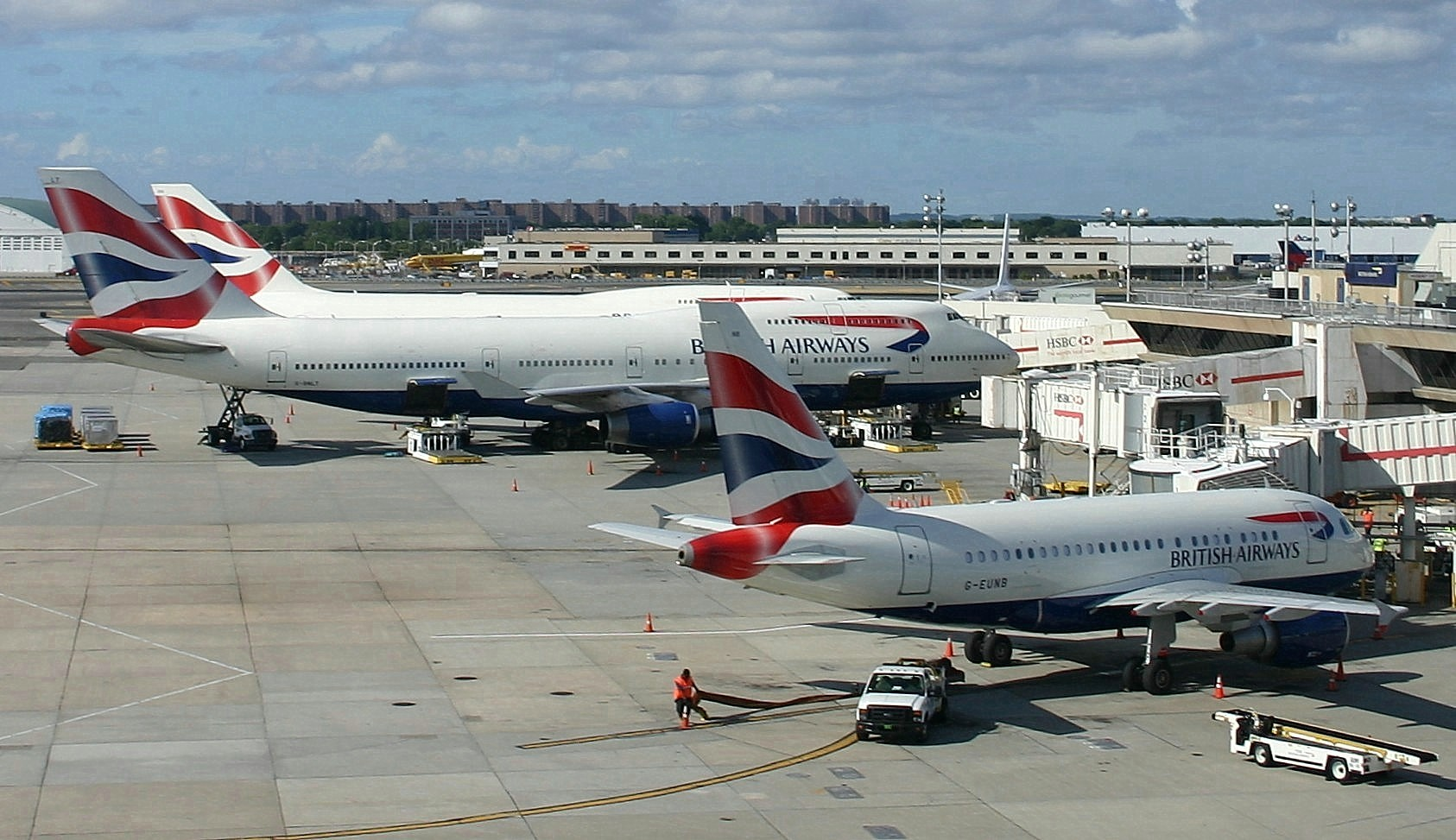
Two British Airways Boeing 747-400s (left) and one Airbus A318 (right) at John F. Kennedy International Airport, New York

In March 2006, the European Aviation Safety Agency (EASA) certified a modified control software enhancement to the Airbus A318 designed to allow the aircraft to perform steep approaches. The aircraft is the largest commercial aircraft certified by EASA for steep approach operations. The software modifies the control laws of the aircraft when the steep approach function is selected by the crew, by automatically deploying some of the spoiler panels to provide additional drag when the aircraft is in the landing configuration. It also provides alternative aural alerts to the crew and modifies spoiler deployment automatically below 37 metres (120 ft) on landing. The A318 steep approach procedure allows the aircraft to perform approaches at descent angles of up to 5.5°, as opposed to the standard 3° for a normal approach.

A test flight was conducted in May 2006 to prove the aircraft's steep approach and short runway performance by landing at London City Airport, where such steep approaches are required. The test flight also confirmed the aircraft's compatibility with the limited maneuvering and parking space at that airport. Subsequently, in August 2009 Airbus delivered the first A318 with steep approach capability to British Airways, which began operating the route the following month as its Club World London City service, eventually having two such aircraft capable of flights between London City Airport and John F. Kennedy International Airport in New York. On the westbound leg from London, a stopover is necessary for refueling, which occurs at Shannon Airport, Ireland because weight restrictions are necessary in order to take off within the existing short runway length of London City Airport. On the eastbound leg from New York this limitation is not present and the aircraft can take all the fuel needed for the transatlantic route to London. As of November 2017, only one aircraft was serving the route, operated in a 32-seat all-business-class configuration. The second aircraft was retired on 31 July 2020, following the COVID-19 pandemic which deemed such type uneconomical.

== Operational history ==
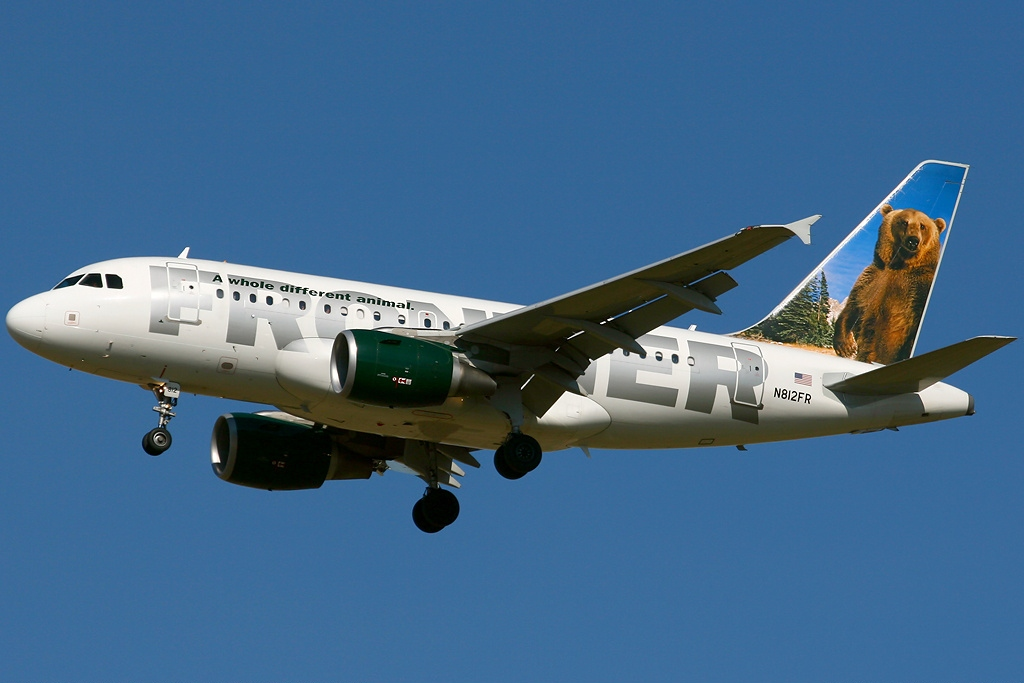
Frontier Airlines was the first A318 operator.

Final assembly of the Airbus A318 was in Hamburg, Germany, although final assembly of other A320 family aircraft models took place in Toulouse, France; Hamburg, Germany; Tianjin, China; and Mobile, Alabama, US. The maiden flight of the Airbus A318 took place from Hamburg Finkenwerder Airport on 15 January 2002. The first customer delivery was on 22 July 2003 to Frontier Airlines.

As of 30 September 2017, 67 A318s remained in service with five airlines, in addition to governments, executive and private jets and undisclosed operators. Frontier Airlines, the launch customer that acquired A318 aircraft between 2003 and 2007, had retired their last A318 by 2013. Air France is the only airline operating the A318.

== Operators ==
As of November 2024 Airbus A318 operators are:

Operator	In service
Air France	4
Governments, executive and private jets	18
Undisclosed operators	30
Total	54

=== Orders and deliveries ===
Orders	Deliveries										
Total	2013	2012	2011	2010	2009	2008	2007	2006	2005	2004	2003
81	2	3	2	2	6	13	17	8	9	10	9

Data through end of September 2017. Updated 7 October 2017.

== Specifications ==
Airbus A318 specifications
Cockpit crew	Two
Exit limit	136
1-class max. seating	132 at 29–30 in (74–76 cm) pitch
1-class, typical	117 at 32 in (81 cm) pitch
2-class, typical	107 (8F at 38 in (97 cm) pitch, 99Y at 32 in (81 cm))
Cargo capacity	21.2 m^{3} (750 cu ft)
Length	31.44 m (103 ft 2 in)
Wingspan	34.10 m (111 ft 11 in)
Wing area	122.4 m^{2} (1,318 sq ft)
Wing sweepback	25°
Tail height	12.56 m (41 ft 2 in)
Cabin width	3.70 m (12 ft 2 in)
Fuselage width	3.95 m (13 ft)
Operating empty weight	39,500 kg (87,100 lb)
Maximum zero-fuel weight (MZFW)	54,500 kg (120,200 lb)
Maximum landing weight (MLW)	57,500 kg (126,800 lb)
Maximum take-off weight (MTOW)	68,000 kg (150,000 lb)
Cruising speed	Mach 0.78 (829 km/h; 448 kn; 515 mph)
Maximum speed	Mach 0.82 (872 km/h; 471 kn; 542 mph)
Range (typical payload)	3,100 nmi (5,740 km; 3,570 mi)
ACJ range	4,200 nmi (7,780 km; 4,830 mi)
Takeoff (MTOW, SL, ISA)	1,780 m (5,840 ft)
Landing (MLW, SL, ISA)	1,230 m (4,040 ft)
Fuel capacity	24,210 L (5,330 imp gal; 6,400 US gal)
Ceiling	39,100–41,000 ft (11,900–12,500 m)
Engines (×2)	CFM56-5B 68.3 in (1.73 m) fan PW6000 56.5 in (1.44 m) fan
Thrust (×2)	96–106 kN (22,000–24,000 lb_{f})

=== Engines ===
Aircraft model	Certification date	Engines
A318-111	23 May 2003	CFM56-5B8/P
A318-112	23 May 2003	CFM56-5B9/P
A318-121	21 December 2005	PW6122A
A318-122	21 December 2005	PW6124A

== See also ==
- Airbus Corporate Jets

Related development

- Airbus A220
- Airbus A319
- Airbus A320 family

Aircraft of comparable role, configuration, and era

- Antonov An-158
- Avro RJ100
- Boeing 717
- Boeing 737-600
- Bombardier CRJ700 series
- Embraer 195
- Fokker 100
- Sukhoi Superjet 100
- Tupolev Tu-334
- Yakovlev Yak-42

Related lists

- List of Airbus A320 operators
- List of jet airliners
- Lists of airlines
