= Ba River (Nanpan River) =

River in China

Coordinates: 24°33′58″N 103°06′45″E

Ba river 巴江
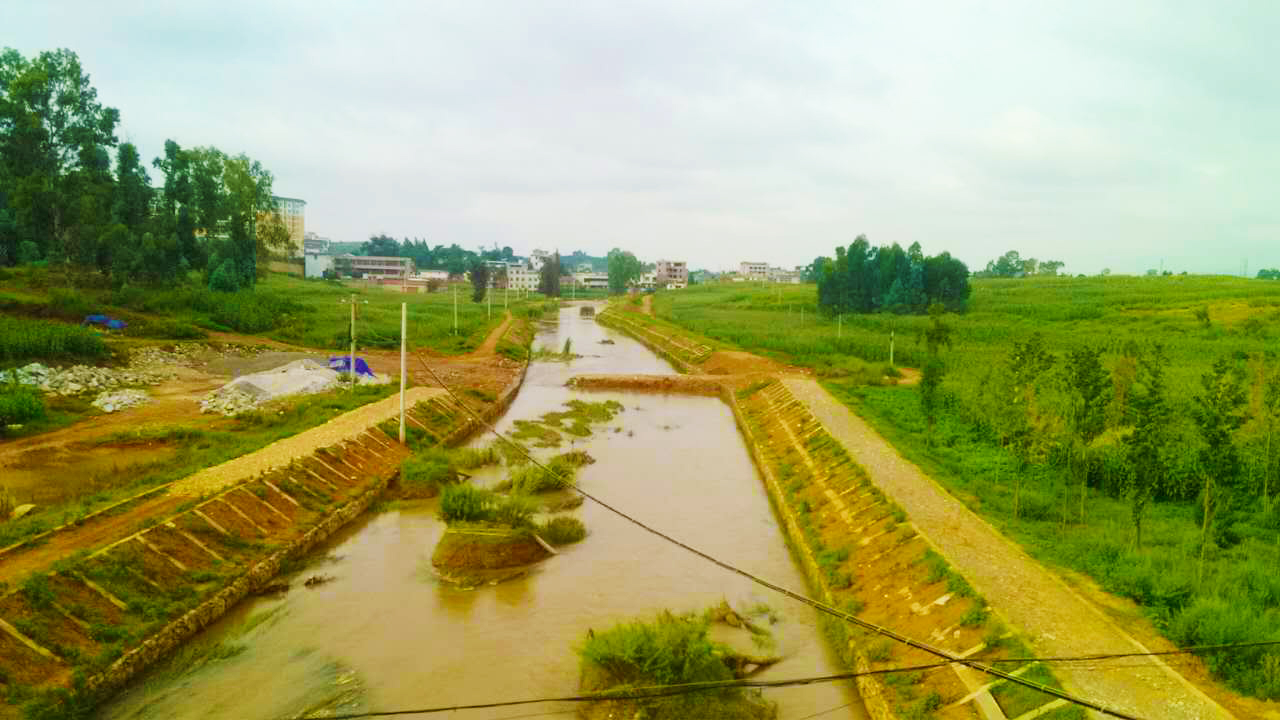
- The section of the river in Bajiang, Shilin County, photographed at the exit of G78 Shantou–Kunming Expressway

Physical characteristics
- Length: 69.6 km (43.2 mi)
- Basin size: 843.5 km

The Ba River (巴江), located in China, is the largest tributary of the Nanpan River. It is the source of the Dadieshui Waterfall.

== See also ==
- List of rivers in China
