= Black Sheep Restaurants =

Hospitality group in Hong Kong

Black Sheep Restaurants is a Hong Kong–based hospitality group. Founded by Syed Asim Hussain in 2012, the group operates over two dozen restaurants in the city. Black Sheep's portfolio includes restaurants serving Punjabi, Cantonese, Sichuanese, Indian, Mexican, and Italian cuisines. Two of the group's restaurants, BELON and New Punjab Club, hold a Michelin Star.

== Restaurants ==
Active Restaurants (restaurants denoted with * hold a Michelin Star)

- Ho Lee Fook
- BELON*
- New Punjab Club*
- Chôm Chôm
- Grand Majestic Sichuan
- Motorino

== COVID-19 pandemic ==
Amidst the COVID-19 pandemic in Hong Kong, the group published a "Covid-19 Playbook" in 2020 to provide guidelines for restaurant operating procedures during the pandemic. In 2021, the group had paid at least $650,000 to cover travel costs for staff members to travel home, along with undergo quarantine in Hong Kong.

== On the edge of chaos: reimagining a Hong Kong icon ==
In 2024 the film On the edge of chaos: reimagining a Hong Kong icon (dir. Lindsay Robertson) documented the process of reviving the Magistracy building into a restaurant. The film was a national winner for 'best branded programme' and 'best director' at the 2024 Asian Academy Creative Awards.
