= Club World London City =

British airline service

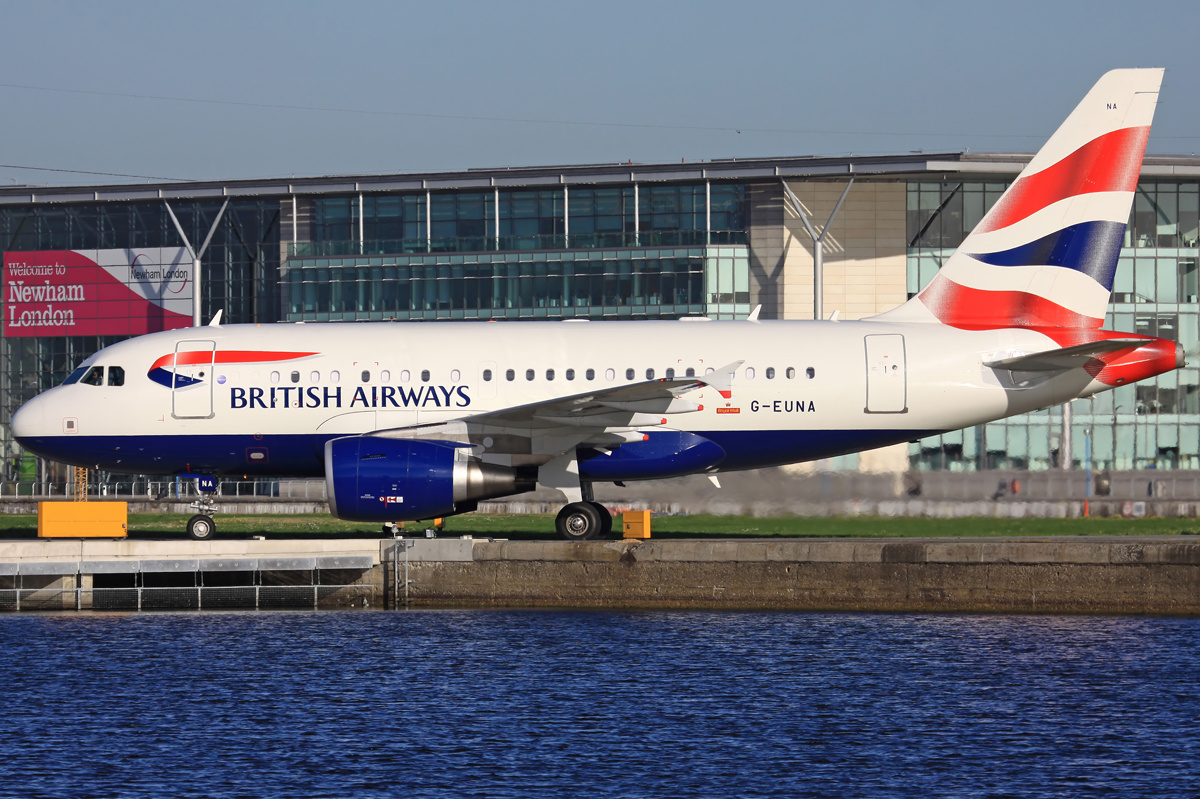
- Airbus A318 at London City Airport
- Founded: September 2009
- Commenced operations: September 2009
- Ceased operations: March 2020 (suspended); August 2020 (discontinued)
- Hubs: London City Airport
- Frequent-flyer program: Oneworld
- Fleet size: 2
- Destinations: 2
- Parent company: British Airways
- Headquarters: London, United Kingdom

Club World London City was an executive all-business-class flight service between London and New York marketed by British Airways. The service launched in September 2009 and operated until March 2020.

== Service ==
In September 2009, British Airways launched Club World London City using two Airbus A318s fitted with 32 lie-flat beds in an all business class cabin. Flights operated under the numbers previously reserved for Concorde: BA001 – BA004.

Until 2016, the service operated twice-daily on weekdays between London City Airport and John F Kennedy International Airport with one daily service operating at weekends. Due to the short runway at London City Airport limiting fuel uptake, westbound flights from London to New York made a stop at Shannon Airport for refuelling, where passengers on board flight BA1 cleared US Customs and Immigration, arriving in New York as domestic passengers.

Although the fuel stop in Shannon led to a longer flight time compared to flights departing from Heathrow Airport to New York, passengers still saved time flying the London City service because they could check a bag just 20 minutes before departure compared to the 60 minutes required at Heathrow. The ability to clear US Customs and Immigration during the refuelling allowed passengers to save time after landing in New York; however, the introduction of Global Entry negated some of these time savings.

BA3, the second daily flight, enjoyed preclearance until 2012 when the US preclearance facility in Shannon shortened its operating hours. The flight was cancelled in 2016, leaving one daily service which preclears in Shannon. The service was suspended in March 2020 during the COVID-19 pandemic, before being officially cancelled in August 2020.

== Operations ==
British Airways (BA) Limited
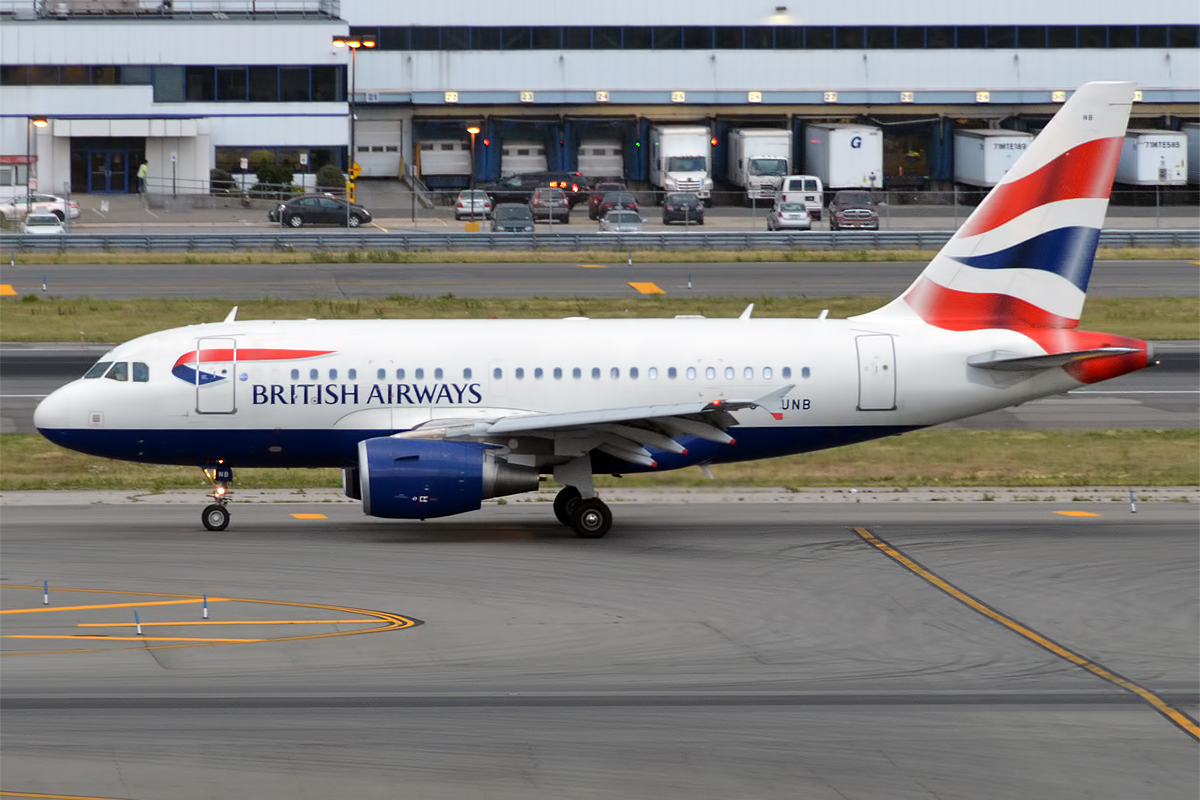
- Airbus A318
IATA	ICAO	Call sign
BA	BAT	GHERKIN
- Founded: 14 March 2012 (as Acoperco)
- Commenced operations: 11 June 2012
- Ceased operations: December 2014
- Frequent-flyer program: Oneworld
- Fleet size: 2
- Destinations: 2
- Parent company: British Airways
- Headquarters: Waterside, Harmondsworth, England
- Website: britishairways.com

British Airways (BA) Ltd. was a British airline and a 100% subsidiary of British Airways created in 2012 to operate the Club World London City service. The subsidiary was established as Acoperco Ltd. on 14 March 2012, which applied for operating and route licences with the Civil Aviation Authority the same month. British Airways transferred its two A318 aircraft to the certificate of the new subsidiary. The airline had codeshare agreements with American Airlines, Finnair, Iberia and US Airways.

The Club World London City services returned to being operated directly by British Airways in 2015 although no changes were made to the aircraft, crews or product offered.

== Fleet ==
The service was operated using two 2008 built Airbus A318-100s, G-EUNA and G-EUNB. Between 2012 and 2015, the subsidiary operated the aircraft under a wet-lease arrangement with British Airways. After 2015, they were directly operated by the mainline British Airways, with no changes to the service offered. Each aircraft had 32 business class seats in a 2-2 configuration of eight rows which reclined fully-flat. In-flight entertainment was provided via iPads distributed to passengers.

G-EUNB was sold to Titan Airways in 2017 after the second service ceased but has since been scrapped. G-EUNA, after 11 months in store, at Madrid-Barajas Airport was ferried to Enschede Airport Twente in February 2021 and scrapped.
