= Loch Bà (Mull) =

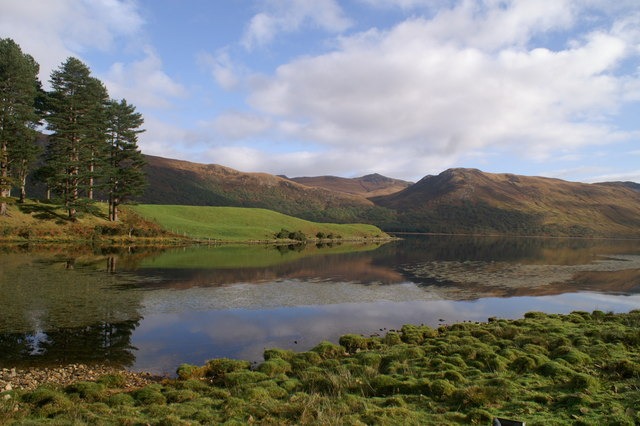
- Loch Bà, near the north-western end
- Interactive map of Loch Bà
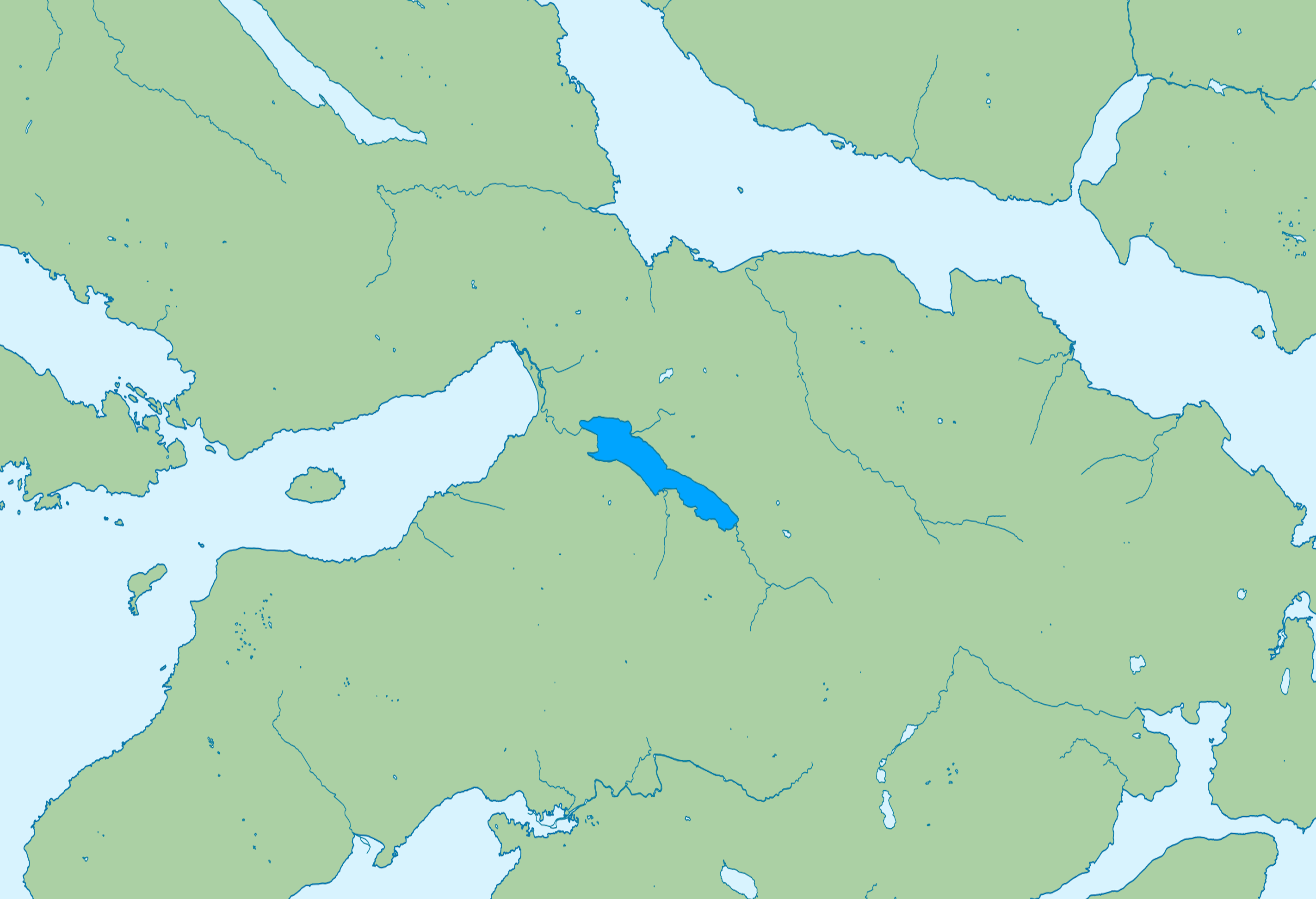
- Map of Loch Bà
- Location: Isle of Mull, Argyll and Bute, Scotland
- Coordinates: 56.47°N 5.95°W
- Primary inflows: Glencannel River, River Clachaig, Allt a' Bheoil-ath Dheirg
- Primary outflows: River Bà
- Max. length: 4.7 km (2.9 mi)
- Max. width: 1.3 km (0.8 mi)
- Surface elevation: 10 m (33 ft)

Loch Bà is a freshwater loch, about 5 km long, in the centre of the Isle of Mull, in Scotland. It is drained by the River Bà, flowing into Loch na Keal, a sea loch on the west of Mull.

== Geography ==
The Loch Bà ring dike, found on the Isle of Mull in Scotland, serves as a classic example of a well formed ring dike. This intrusive body forms an oval and its diameter can be measured at roughly 5.8 km by 8.5 km. The width of the dike varies throughout the profile, with a maximum width of approximately 300 meters. The composition varies from rhyolite to felsite, with phenocrysts of alkali feldspar and mafic minerals.
