= Ba River (Fiji) =

River in Fiji

Coordinates: 17°27′S 177°39′E

The Ba River (Fijian pronunciation: [ᵐba]) is located in the island of Viti Levu in Fiji. The town of Ba is built on its banks. The Rarawai Sugar Mill is located a kilometer upstream on the bank of the Ba River and makes use of the river water in its boilers.

Ba River is famous for its clams, which are a local delicacy.
