= Agneepath (soundtrack) =

2012 soundtrack album by Ajay–Atul

Soundtrack album by Ajay–Atul
- Released: 3 December 2011
- Genre: Film soundtrack
- Length: 31:40
- Label: Sony Music Entertainment
- Producer: Ajay–Atul

Ajay–Atul chronology
Singham (2011)	Agneepath (2011)	Bol Bachchan (2012)

Agneepath is the soundtrack album for 2012 film of the same name produced by Hiroo Yash Johar and Karan Johar under Dharma Productions and directed by Karan Malhotra in his directorial debut. The music of Agneepath was composed by Ajay–Atul, with lyrics written by Amitabh Bhattacharya.

== Development ==
The songs were composed with the help of live instrumentation being extensively used. While explaining the process involved in composing the soundtrack, Ajay said that Malhotra narrated the story to them for over four hours, whilst humming the background score that he wanted. This was followed by innumerable discussions which made them "understand each other well". He also mentioned that the song "Chikni Chameli" was a remake of their own Marathi song "Kombadi Palali" from the film Jatra (2006). Sony Music acquired the rights to the album for ₹90 million (US$940,000).

== Release ==
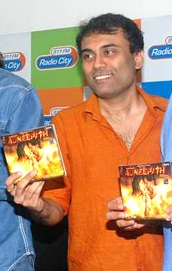
Amitabh Bhattacharya at the audio release of Agneepath

The film's audio was digitally released on 12 December 2011, and a physical release of the album took place on 16 December at the Radio City FM station (Mumbai) with the composer duo, lyricist and the director in attendance.

== Track listing ==
Track listing
No.	Title	Singer(s)	Length
1.	"Chikni Chameli"	Shreya Ghoshal	5:03
2.	"Shah Ka Rutba"	Sukhwinder Singh, Anand Raj Anand, Krishna Beura	5:23
3.	"O Saiyyan"	Roop Kumar Rathod	4:38
4.	"Abhi Mujh Mein Kahin"	Sonu Nigam	6:04
5.	"Gun Gun Guna"	Sunidhi Chauhan, Udit Narayan	4:36
6.	"Deva Shree Ganesha"	Ajay Gogavale	5:56
Total length:			31:40

== Reception ==
The music of Agneepath has received positive reviews from critics. Joginder Tuteja praised the compositions and added that "Chikni Chameli" would be responsible for the rise in sales of the album. Sukanya Verma of Rediff.com gave the album 3 out of 5 stars and said that the film's soundtrack was better than that of the original, while praising the composition of the songs "Deva Shree Ganesha" and "O Saiyyan". A review carried by the BBC summed up, "Blessedly free of unnecessary remixes, Agneepath is a well-crafted, evocative collection of songs that proves the adage that, when it comes to Indian music composers, sometimes two heads can be better than one. The song "Chikni Chameli" was extremely well received and topped the music charts.

== Controversy ==
In January 2012, a plagiarism suit was filed against Sony Music and Dharma Productions by a Mumbai-based engineer, for lifting and featuring the song "O Saiyyan" in the album. The Nagpur High Court ordered Johar to release the film, only after truncating the use of the song in it.

== Awards and nominations ==
Award	Date	Category	Recipient(s)	Result
Filmfare Awards	13 January 2013	Best Lyricist	Amitabh Bhattacharya ("Abhi Mujh Main Kahin")	Nominated
Filmfare Awards	13 January 2013	Best Male Playback Singer	Sonu Nigam ("Abhi Mujh Main Kahin")	Nominated
Filmfare Awards	13 January 2013	Best Female Playback Singer	Shreya Ghoshal ("Chikni Chameli")	Nominated
Zee Cine Awards	20 January 2013	Best Actor in a Negative Role	Rishi Kapoor	Won
Zee Cine Awards	20 January 2013	Best Playback Singer – Male	Sonu Nigam ("Abhi Mujh Main Kahin")	Won
Zee Cine Awards	20 January 2013	Best Background Score	Ajay–Atul	Won
Zee Cine Awards	20 January 2013	Song of the Year	"Chikni Chameli"	Nominated
IIFA Awards	6 July 2013	Best Lyricist	Amitabh Bhattacharya ("Abhi Mujh Main Kahin")	Won
IIFA Awards	6 July 2013	Best Playback Singer - Male	Sonu Nigam ("Abhi Mujh Main Kahin")	Won
IIFA Awards	6 July 2013	Best Playback Singer - Female	Shreya Ghoshal ("Chikni Chameli")	Won
IIFA Awards	6 July 2013	Best Music Director	Ajay–Atul	Nominated
IIFA Awards	6 July 2013	Best Playback Singer - Male	Ajay Gogavale ("Deva Shree Ganesha")	Nominated
Mirchi Music Awards	7 February 2013	Song of The Year	"Abhi Mujh Mein Kahin"	Won
Mirchi Music Awards	7 February 2013	Album of The Year	Ajay–Atul, Amitabh Bhattacharya	Won
Mirchi Music Awards	7 February 2013	Male Vocalist of The Year	Sonu Nigam ("Abhi Mujh Main Kahin")	Won
Mirchi Music Awards	7 February 2013	Female Vocalist of The Year	Shreya Ghoshal ("Chikni Chameli")	Won
Mirchi Music Awards	7 February 2013	Music Composer of The Year	Ajay–Atul ("Abhi Mujh Main Kahin")	Won
Mirchi Music Awards	7 February 2013	Song representing Sufi tradition	"O Saiyyan"	Won
Mirchi Music Awards	7 February 2013	Song Recording/Sound Engineering of the Year	Vijay Dayal ("Deva Shree Ganesha")	Won
Mirchi Music Awards	7 February 2013	Male Vocalist of The Year	Roop Kumar Rathod ("O Saiyyan")	Nominated
Mirchi Music Awards	7 February 2013	Female Vocalist of The Year	Sunidhi Chauhan ("Gun Gun Guna")	Nominated
Mirchi Music Awards	7 February 2013	Music Composer of The Year	Ajay–Atul ("Chikni Chameli")	Nominated
Mirchi Music Awards	7 February 2013	Lyricist of The Year	Amitabh Bhattacharya ("Abhi Mujh Main Kahin")	Nominated
Mirchi Music Awards	7 February 2013	Song representing Sufi tradition	"Shah Ka Rutba"	Nominated
Mirchi Music Awards	7 February 2013	Programmer & Arranger of the Year	Ajay–Atul ("O Saiyyan")	Nominated
Mirchi Music Awards	7 February 2013	Song Recording/Sound Engineering of the Year	Vijay Dayal ("Abhi Mujh Main Kahin")	Nominated
Mirchi Music Awards	7 February 2013	Background Score of the Year	Ajay–Atul	Nominated
