= Bol Bachchan (soundtrack) =

Soundtrack album by Himesh Reshammiya and Ajay–Atul
- Released: 8 June 2012
- Recorded: 2012
- Genre: Feature film soundtrack
- Length: 40:11
- Language: Hindi
- Label: T-Series
- Producer: Himesh Reshammiya; Ajay–Atul
External audio
- Audio Jukebox on YouTube

Himesh Reshammiya chronology
Dangerous Ishhq (2012)	Bol Bachchan (2012)	Oh My God (2012)

Ajay–Atul chronology
Agneepath (2012)	Bol Bachchan (2012)	Bharatiya (2012)

Bol Bachchan is the soundtrack album to the 2012 film of the same name directed by Rohit Shetty and produced by Ajay Devgn and Dhilin Mehta under Ajay Devgn FFilms and Shree Ashtavinayak Cine Vision respectively, with distribution under Fox Star Studios. The film stars Devgn, Abhishek Bachchan, Asin, Prachi Desai, Krushna Abhishek, Neeraj Vora and Archana Puran Singh.

The film's soundtrack featured three songs composed by Himesh Reshammiya, and one song by Ajay–Atul as the guest composer. It also included remixes of the four songs, totalling upto 8 tracks in number. Sajid–Farhad, Shabbir Ahmed, Swanand Kirkire and Sameer served as the lyricists. The album was released through T-Series on 8 June 2012.

== Background ==
The soundtrack originally featured three songs composed by Himesh Reshammiya. Bachchan recalled while he was recording the title track at Himesh's recording studio, the composer brought Ajay Devgn to also record the track after Himesh persuading him to do so. The song "Chalao Na Naino Se" was not planned in the album; Rohit Shetty contacted Himesh to compose a romantic number, which led to him composing the tune overnight. Ajay–Atul served as the guest composer for the album, composing one song "Nach Le".

== Reception ==
A critic from The Times of India stated that "the music is a letdown and struggles to leave a lasting impression". Reviewer based at NDTV also noted that the soundtrack "fails to impress" with the title track being the "sole saving grace". Another critic from News18 summarized that, "With four lyricists at their disposal, one expected a much better performance by Himesh Reshammiya and Ajay-Atul." Vipin Nair from Music Aloud stated, "Guest composition by Ajay Atul works better than the three from Himesh in Bol Bachchan." In contrast, Joginder Tuteja of Bollywood Hungama wrote "Bol Bachchan is a good album which delivers what is expected from a movie like this which doesn't have much scope for music in the first place." Nandini Krishnan of The New Indian Express considered the music to be "retarded".

== Track listing ==
No.	Title	Lyrics	Music	Singers	Length
1.	"Bol Bachchan"	Sajid–Farhad	Himesh Reshammiya	Amitabh Bachchan, Abhishek Bachchan, Ajay Devgn, Himesh Reshammiya, Mamta Sharma, Vineet Singh	6:00
2.	"Chalao Na Naino Se"	Shabbir Ahmed	Himesh Reshammiya	Himesh Reshammiya, Shreya Ghoshal, Shabab Sabri	5:41
3.	"Nach Le"	Swanand Kirkire	Ajay–Atul	Sukhwinder Singh, Shreya Ghoshal	4:43
4.	"Jab Se Dheki Hai"	Sameer	Himesh Reshammiya	Mohit Chauhan	4:13
5.	"Bol Bachchan" (Remix)	Sajid–Farhad	Himesh Reshammiya, DJ A.Sen and DJ Amann Nagpal	Amitabh Bachchan, Abhishek Bachchan, Ajay Devgn, Himesh Reshammiya, Mamta Sharma, Vineet Singh	4:52
6.	"Chalao Na Naino Se" (Remix)	Shabbir Ahmed	Himesh Reshammiya, DJ Sheizwood	Himesh Reshammiya, Shreya Ghoshal, Shabab Sabri	5:27
7.	"Nach Le" (Remix)	Swanand Kirkire	Ajay–Atul, DJ Gaurav	Sukhwinder Singh, Shreya Ghoshal	5:09
8.	"Jab Se Dheki Hai" (Remix)	Shabbir Ahmed	Himesh Reshammiya, Teenu Arora	Mohit Chauhan	4:06
Total length:					40:11
