= Jitendra Joshi =

Indian actor (1978)

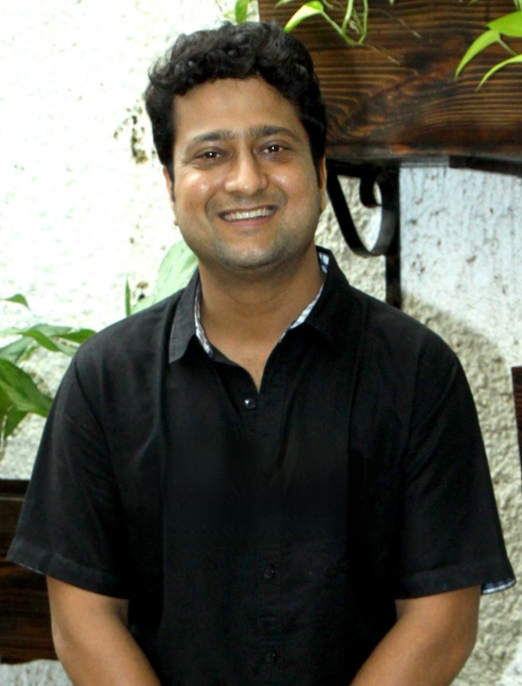
- Joshi in 2015
- Born: 27 January 1978 (age 48); Pune, Maharashtra, India
- Occupations: Actor; poet; lyricist; producer
- Years active: 2001–present
- Spouse: Mitali Joshi (m. 2009)
- Children: 1

Jitendra Joshi (born 27 January 1978) is an Indian actor, anchor, lyricist and producer who works primarily in Marathi cinema, in addition to appearing in Hindi films and streaming series. Known for his versatility across leading, supporting and antagonistic roles, he is the recipient of several accolades, including four Filmfare Awards Marathi, and four Maharashtra State Film Awards.

Joshi began his acting career in Marathi television in 2001 and made his film debut with the Hindi comedy Praan Jaye Par Shaan Na Jaye (2003). He gained early recognition as a television anchor, most notably as a host of the show Campus: A Fair War, and as a lyricist wrote the popular Marathi song "Kombadi Palali" for Jatra (2005). He landed his first film lead in the romantic comedy Golmaal (2006), following a supporting role in Gulmohar (2009) and the commercially successful comedy Zhakaas (2011). His portrayal of the saint-poet in the biographical drama Tukaram (2012) earned him the Best Actor award at the Pune International Film Festivall, and reached wider audiences with the blockbuster Duniyadari (2013) and further roles in Baji (2015) and the cult favourite Kaakan (2015).

Joshi received critical acclaim for his performance in the comedy drama Ventilator (2016) and the commercially successful comedy-drama Baghtos Kay Mujra Kar (2017), and rose to national prominence playing Constable Katekar in Sacred Games (2018), India's first Netflix original series. He won further awards for the comedy-drama Choricha Mamla (2020) and later co-founded the production house Blue Drop Films, producing and starring in the drama Godavari (2021), for which he became the first Marathi actor to win the Best Actor award at the International Film Festival of India. He earned further recognition for Naal 2 (2023) and the thriller Ghaath (2023), and appeared in the commercially successful comedy-horror Tumbadchi Manjula (2026).

== Early life ==
Jitendra Joshi was born on 27 January 1978 in Pune, Maharashtra, into a Marwari family. He grew up in a middle-class household and worked various jobs during his teenage years to support his family, including distributing newspapers and assisting at his uncle's electrical shop.

Despite Marathi not being his native language, he became fluent in it and developed an interest in Marathi theatre during his school and college years in Pune, where he participated in one-act plays and college theatre. Joshi has credited the encouragement of a teacher who recognized his talent and the influence of theatre performances by actors such as Subodh Bhave and Lokesh Gupte for inspiring him to pursue acting. He completed a diploma in polytechnic from Vidya Prasarak Mandal's Polytechnic, Thane, and later studied at D. Y. Patil Arts, Commerce & Science College, Pune.

== Career ==
=== Television and early films (2001–2011) ===
Joshi began his screen career on Marathi television in 2001, appearing in the Alpha TV Marathi family serial Shriyut Gangadhar Tipre. Around the same time, he played Krishna in the daily soap Ghadlay Bighadlay, a role that brought him his first widespread recognition. He made his film debut in 2003 with the Hindi comedy Praan Jaye Par Shaan Na Jaye, after being cast by producer Mahesh Manjrekar, who had seen him perform in a play. Alongside acting, Joshi anchored the youth-oriented show Campus: A Fair War in 2004, for which he won the Best Anchor (Male) awards at the Zee Marathi Utsav Natyancha Awards and the Maharashtra Times Sanman.

Through the second half of the decade Joshi appeared in a number of Marathi films in supporting and comic roles, including Pak Pak Pakaak (2005) and the comedy drama No Problem (2005). He also worked as a lyricist during this period, writing the Marathi song "Kombdi Palali" for the film Jatra (2005), composed by Ajay–Atul; the tune was later adapted for the Hindi song "Chikni Chameli". Joshi landed his first lead role in 2006 with the Marathi romantic comedy Golmaal, playing a simple man who has loved a woman since his college days, opposite debutante Amruta Khanvilkar. He subsequently appeared in a supporting role in Gajendra Ahire's marital drama Gulmohar (2009) and played one of the two lead roles, alongside Makarand Anaspure, in Ahire's ensemble family drama Sumbaran (2009).

In 2009, he took over as anchor of the popular Zee Marathi game show Home Minister after its regular host, Aadesh Bandekar, stepped away to contest the Maharashtra Legislative Assembly election, and in 2011 he also hosted the talent reality show Marathi Paaul Padte Pudhe. That year he also took on a role of television reporter and one of two central comic roles, alongside Anaspure and Tejaswini Lonari, in Guldasta; Naru Mama, the free-spirited uncle of the teenage protagonist, in Sujay Dahake's coming-of-age drama Shala, adapted from Milind Bokil's novel of the same name, which went on to win the National Film Award for Best Feature Film in Marathi; and a supporting role as the protagonist's confidant in the comedy Zhakaas, for which he won the Favourite Supporting Actor award at the Maharashtracha Favourite Kon awards.

=== Breakthrough as a leading actor (2012–2015) ===
His most acclaimed leading role came in 2012, when he played the title role of the 17th-century Varkari saint-poet in the biographical drama Tukaram, directed by Chandrakant Kulkarni. Shakti Salgaokar of DNA called his performance as "absolute delight" and stated "Joshi comfortably eases into the role and keeps you captivated without going overboard with 'performance'." He went on to win Best Actor at the 11th Pune International Film Festival and was nominated at the Zee Chitra Gaurav Puraskar. Later that year, he took the lead role of a struggling gardener and father, in the family drama Kutumb. Reviewing the film for The Common Man Speaks, Keyur Seta praised Joshi's performance, describing it as "brilliant" and stating that he "pours his heart out while playing a caring father and husband." He portrayed an antagonist Sainath Dedgaonkar in Sanjay Jadhav's coming of age Duniyadari (2013) opposite Swapnil Joshi and Ankush Chaudhari. The film emerged as a blockbuster, grossing over ₹32 crore worldwide and becoming the highest-grossing Marathi film of its time. He also had a brief role as Ashish, the boyfriend of Singham's childhood friend Menka (played by Sonalee Kulkarni), in Rohit Shetty's Singham Returns (2014).

In 2014 Joshi played the lead role of an unassuming man who holds fast to his faith, in the drama Raakhandaar, which received a mixed critical response. He then continued to play negative roles, appearing as the influential and aggressive Kolte Patil in the comedy Premasathi Coming Suun (2014) and as the principal antagonist opposite Shreyas Talpade and Amruta Khanvilkar in Baji (2015). Baji collected ₹10.79 crore at the box office, becoming the tenth highest-grossing Marathi film of the year. A Koimoi critic praised Joshi's performance, writing that "Joshi may be the villain, but he is the true hero of this story," while commending his commanding screen presence and genuinely frightening portrayal of Martand. He returned to a leading romantic role the same year in Kranti Redkar's directorial debut Kaakan, playing Kisu, a poor villager separated from his lover by class differences; though the film did not perform well commercially on release, it has since grown into a cult favourite in Marathi cinema. The Times of India review wrote that "Joshi continues his effortless command over characters," praising his ability to play both the young and the elderly version of Kisu with equal conviction and noting that he seemed to inhabit each costume and persona completely.

=== National recognition and OTT debut (2016–2019) ===
In 2016 Joshi co-starred in the National Award winning comedy-drama Ventilator, produced by Priyanka Chopra's Purple Pebble Pictures. The film follows the Kamerkar family, whose long-buried conflicts resurface after its patriarch is hospitalized and placed on a ventilator before Ganesh Chaturthi. He played Prasanna Kamerkar, Gajanan's son, a man preoccupied with his own political ambitions who is forced to confront his strained relationship with his father. His performance was widely praised, earning him the Sanskruti Kaladarpan for Best Actor, the MaTa Sanman for Best Supporting Actor, and a nomination for Best Actor at the Filmfare Awards Marathi. Kunal Guha of Mumbai Mirror wrote that as the film progresses, Joshi "furnishes his character's state of mind immaculately," calling his performance one worth acknowledging. The film was also a commercial success, collecting ₹25 crore at the box office. The following year, he played a village sarpanch and devotee of the Maratha king Shivaji, whose efforts to restore a decaying hill fort draw him into local political conflict, in the comedy-drama Baghtos Kay Mujra Kar, directed by Hemant Dhome. Shalaka Nalawade of The Times of India wrote that "BKMK belongs to Jitendra Joshi," describing his bumbling, idealistic, and clueless sarpanch as endearing to an almost excessive degree.

He reached a national audience in 2018 with the role of Constable Katekar in Sacred Games, India's first Netflix original series, starring alongside Saif Ali Khan and Nawazuddin Siddiqui. Critics singled out his performance for bringing humour and local authenticity to the series; writing for Scroll.in, Nandini Ramnath said the constable was brought to life marvellously by Joshi, who added humour and local flavour to the show. He won the Best Supporting Actor award at the News18 iReel Awards for the role. The same year he played the antagonist, a village goon who terrorizes the local populace, opposite Riteish Deshmukh in the action drama Mauli. In 2019 Joshi hosted the talk show Don Special on Colors Marathi, in which he interviewed pairs of celebrity guests from Marathi film, television, and public life.

In 2020 he played a professional thief who steals only what he needs to survive, in the comedy-drama Choricha Mamla, an adaptation of Dario Fo's play The Virtuous Burglar; the performance won him Best Actor at the Zee Talkies Comedy Awards and the Maharashtra State Film Award for Best Comedian. Santosh Bhingarde of Sakal wrote that Joshi was the one who "captured the most emotions in the entire film," praising his portrayal of the straightforward, brash Nandan as the performance's standout. The same year he portrayed a corrupt businessman overseeing a highway project through tribal land who turns on his own allies in a desperate bid for survival, in the Netflix horror series Betaal. In 2021 he had a brief role as the estranged husband of the female lead (played by Neha Pendse), in the drama June, for which he also co-wrote the lyrics with Nikhil Mahajan.

=== Producer and recent work (2020–present) ===
Joshi expanded into film production, co-founding projects under the banner Blue Drop Films. In 2021 he produced, starred in, and wrote the lyrics for the Marathi drama Godavari, directed by Nikhil Mahajan, playing Nishikant Deshmukh, a disillusioned man collecting rent for his landowning family in Nashik. The film premiered internationally at the 2021 Vancouver International Film Festival, and at the 52nd International Film Festival of India, Joshi won the Best Actor Award the first time the honour went to a Marathi actor. Kalpeshraj Kubal of Maharashtra Times wrote that Joshi, in the role of Nishi, "reflected the anguish and longing" of the character, layering multiple shades of emotion into the performance. He went on to win the Best Actor Critics award at the Filmfare Awards Marathi for the performance, where the film also won Best Film. At the 59th Maharashtra State Film Awards, Joshi won the Best Actor and Best Lyricist awards for his work on the film, which also won Best Film III.

In 2022, he played the menacing villager in the Netflix Hindi film Thar and wrote the lyrics for two songs, "Chaal Ka Badalaleli" and "Ka Pahije," in the romantic drama Medium Spicy. Avinash Lohana of Pinkvilla wrote, "Joshi’s act as Panna proves that there is nothing that he can’t aptly play on screen." His performance as Panna in the film earned him a nomination for Best Supporting Actor at the Filmfare OTT Awards. He was next seen in Naal 2, the sequel to the 2018 film, directed by Sudhakar Reddy Yakkanti, for which he won the Filmfare Best Supporting Actor award. He followed it with the Marathi thriller Ghaath (2023), in which he portrayed a Naxalite and for which he won his second Filmfare Best Actor Critics award at the 9th Filmfare Awards Marathi; Debanjan Dhar of Outlook wrote, "Joshi grounding the film with its most condensed, affecting performance." He also appeared in the Hindi films Ulajh (2024) and Agni (2024).

Joshi opened 2026 with two Marathi releases on the same day: the psychological thriller Magic, directed by Ravindra Karmarkar, in which he played the lead role of a guilt-ridden encounter specialist confronted by the daughter of a man he had killed; and Hemant Dhome's social drama Krantijyoti Vidyalay Marathi Madhyam, a commercial success centred on the fight to save a Marathi-medium school, in which he had a cameo as the state's education minister. He went on to play a village strongman caught up in a village-wide panic over a supposed haunting, in the comedy-horror Tumbadchi Manjula (2026), a remake of the Kannada hit Su From So, which went on to become a commercial success, earning ₹19.34 crore worldwide. Mayur Sanap of Rediff wrote that Joshi's streaked stubble and curly hair gave him a distinctive look, and that while he played the part with sincerity, Ravi Anna "never moves beyond a straightforward good man figure." He followed it with a key supporting role in Mardini (2026) alongside Prarthana Behere and Abhijeet Khandkekar, a crime drama centred on a mother's fight to protect her daughter, marking Shreyas Talpade's return to film production after a twelve-year gap. The film received a mixed response from critics and flopped at the box office.

== Personal life ==
Joshi married writer and filmmaker Mitali Joshi in 2009; she wrote and directed the English-language short film Loose Long Shirt (2021), which was produced by Joshi. The couple have a daughter, Reva.

== Filmography ==
=== Films ===
==== As Actor ====
Key
†	Denotes films that have not yet been released

Year	Title	Role	Language	Notes	Ref.
2003	Praan Jaye Par Shaan Na Jaye	Milind	Hindi		
2005	Pak Pak Pakaak	Sarpanch's son	Marathi		
2005	No Problem	Veeru / Krishna	Marathi		
2005	Dombivli Fast	Common man	Marathi		
2006	Golmaal	Soham Dixit	Marathi		
2006	Majhi Maanas	Jitu	Marathi		
2006	Aaila Re!!	Ranjan	Marathi		
2007	Ghar Doghanch	Jitendra	Marathi		
2007	Panga Naa Lo	Priya's husband	Hindi		
2008	Chanda		Marathi		
2009	Gulmohar	Dr.Bhagwan Satpute	Marathi		
2009	Hay Kay Nay Kay	Sadashiv Dhapane	Marathi		
2009	Sumbaran	Viru	Marathi		
2010	Navra Avali Bayko Lovely	Mahesh	Marathi		
2011	Guldasta	Jeetu	Marathi		
2011	Bharat Majha Desh Aahe	Jitendra	Marathi		
2011	Shala	Naru mama	Marathi		
2011	Aata Ga Baya		Marathi		
2011	Zhakaas	Pankaj	Marathi		
2012	Matter	Babya	Marathi		
2012	Ha Bharat Mazza	Bharat	Marathi		
2012	Tukaram	Tukaram	Marathi		
2012	Kutumb	Namdev Solkar	Marathi		
2013	The Attacks of 26/11	Constable	Hindi		
2013	Konkanastha	Inspector	Marathi		
2013	Zapatlela 2	Vinayak Chitre	Marathi	Guest appearance	
2013	Mhais		Marathi		
2013	Duniyadari	Sainath Dedgaonkar (Sai)	Marathi		
2014	Cappuccino	Kedar (KD)	Marathi		
2014	Hututu	Vaibhav Dhanawde	Marathi		
2014	Singham Returns	Ashish Kumar	Hindi		
2014	Premasathi Coming Suun	Kolte Patil	Marathi		
2014	Raakhandaar	Sadanand Lokre	Marathi		
2015	Baji	Martand	Marathi		
2015	Just Gammat	Ashok	Marathi		
2015	Kaakan	Kisu	Marathi		
2015	Mhais		Marathi		
2015	Dhol Taashe	Aditya Deshmukh	Marathi		
2016	Natsamrat	Mr. Dixit's son	Marathi	Guest appearance	
2016	Shasan	Subhash Naigaonkar	Marathi		
2016	Poshter Girl	Bharatrao Zende	Marathi		
2016	Ventilator	Prasanna Kamerkar	Marathi		
2017	Baghtos Kay Mujra Kar	Nanasaheb Deshmukh	Marathi		
2017	Tu. Ka. Patil	Tu. Ka. Patil	Marathi		
2017	Poster Boys	Photographer Suraj	Hindi		
2018	Mauli	Nana Londhe (Dharamaraj)	Marathi		
2019	Hirkani	Fakir	Marathi		
2020	Choricha Mamla	Nandan	Marathi		
2021	June	Abhijit	Marathi		
2021	Life in Dark		Hindi		
2021	Godavari	Nishikant Deshmukh	Marathi	Also producer	
2022	Thar	Panna	Hindi		
2022	Loose Long Shirt	–	English	Short film; As producer	
2022	Ved	Ramesh	Marathi		
2023	Ghaath	ACP Nagpure	Marathi		
2023	School College Ani Life	Ismael Sheikh	Marathi		
2023	Naal 2	Ajinath	Marathi		
2024	Ulajh	Prakash Kamat	Hindi		
2024	Agni	Mahadev Nigde	Hindi		
2025	Sarzameen	Colonel Ahmed Iqbal	Hindi		
2025	Bandar	Deore	Hindi		
2026	Krantijyoti Vidyalay Marathi Madhyam	Vishvajeet Deshmukh	Marathi		
2026	Magic	Arun Raut	Marathi		
2026	Toaster	Amol Amre	Hindi		
2026	Raja Shivaji	Pant	Hindi / Marathi	Bilingual film	
2026	Tumbadchi Manjula	Ravi Anna	Marathi		
2026	Mardini	Suryakant Gaitonde	Marathi		
2026	Daayra	Inspectoor Karad	Hindi		

=== Television ===
Year	Title	Role	Channel	Notes	Ref.
2001	Shriyut Gangadhar Tipre	Pami	Alpha TV Marathi		
2004	Ghadlay Bighadlay	Krishna	Alpha TV Marathi		
2004	Campus: A Fair War	Anchor	Alpha TV Marathi		
2008	Hasya Samrat	Anchor	Zee Marathi		
2009	Home Minister	Anchor	Zee Marathi		
2011	Marathi Paaul Padte Pudhe	Anchor	Zee Marathi		
2012	Sa Re Ga Ma Pa Marathi	Contestant	Zee Marathi	Season 11	
2017	Toofan Aalaya	Anchor	Zee Marathi		
2018	Garja Maharashtra	Anchor	Sony Marathi		
2019	Bigg Boss Marathi 2	Himself	Colors Marathi	Guest	
2019	Don Special	Anchor	Colors Marathi		

=== Theatre ===
Title	Role	Language	Ref.
Hum To Tere Aashiq Hain	Anil Pradhan	Marathi	
Prem Naam Hai Mera... Prem Chopra!	Niranjan	Marathi	
Mukkam Post Bombilwadi		Marathi	
Chhel Chhabilo Gujarati	Shyam	Gujarati	
Hamidabaichi Kothi	Sattaar Bhai	Marathi	
Don Special	Milind Bhagwat	Marathi	
Time Please	Dhananjay Mane	Hindi	

=== Web series ===
Year	Title	Role	Network	Ref.
2018	Sacred Games	Katekar	Netflix	
2020	Betaal	Ajay Mudhalvan	Netflix	
2021	Shanti Kranti	Gopi	SonyLIV	
2021	Cartel	Madhu	ALTBalaji	
2022	Bloody Brothers	Dushyant	ZEE5	
2022	Don't Drink & Drive	Jeet Singh	Amazon MiniTV	
2023	School of Lies	Aniruddh	Disney+ Hotstar	

==== As Lyricist ====
- Jatra (2005)
- Striker (2010)
- Aayna Ka Bayna (2012)
- Traffic (2016)
- Chidiya (2016)
- Godavari (2021)
- Medium Spicy (2022)
- Aarpar (2025)
- Tighee (2026)

== Awards and nominations ==
Award	Year	Category	Work	Result	Ref(s)
International Film Festival of India	2021	Best Actor Award (Male)	Godavari	Won	
Fakt Marathi Cine Sanman	2023	Best Lyricist	Godavari (Khal Khal Goda)	Nominated	
Filmfare Awards Marathi	2017	Best Actor	Ventilator	Nominated	
Filmfare Awards Marathi	2017	Best Supporting Actor	Poshter Girl	Nominated	
Filmfare Awards Marathi	2022	Best Actor	Choricha Mamla	Nominated	
Filmfare Awards Marathi	2023	Best Film	Godavari	Won	
Filmfare Awards Marathi	2023	Best Actor	Godavari	Nominated	
Filmfare Awards Marathi	2023	Best Actor Critics	Godavari	Won	
Filmfare Awards Marathi	2023	Best Lyricist	Godavari (Khal Khal Goda)	Nominated	
Filmfare Awards Marathi	2024	Best Supporting Actor	Naal 2	Won	
Filmfare Awards Marathi	2025	Best Actor Critics	Ghaath	Won	
Filmfare Awards Marathi	2026	Best Lyricist	Aarpar (Title Track)	Nominated	
Filmfare OTT Awards	2022	Best Supporting Actor, Web Original Film (Male)	Thar	Nominated	
Filmfare OTT Awards	2025	Best Supporting Actor, Web Original Film (Male)	Agni	Nominated	
MaTa Sanman	2004	Best Male Compère	Campus: A Fair War	Won	
MaTa Sanman	2026	Best Actor in a Play	Don Special	Won	
MaTa Sanman	2017	Best Supporting Actor	Ventilator	Won	
MaTa Sanman	2023	Best Actor	Godavari	Won	
Maharashtra State Film Awards	2020	Best Comedian Male	Choricha Mamla	Won	
Maharashtra State Film Awards	2021	Best Film III	Godavari	Won	
Maharashtra State Film Awards	2021	Best Actor	Godavari	Won	
Maharashtra State Film Awards	2021	Best Lyricist	Godavari (Khal Khal Goda)	Won	
Maharashtracha Favourite Kon?	2011	Style Icon of the Year	—N/a	Nominated	
Maharashtracha Favourite Kon?	2012	Favourite Actor	Tukaram	Nominated	
Maharashtracha Favourite Kon?	2012	Favourite Supporting Actor	Zhakaas	Won	
Maharashtracha Favourite Kon?	2013	Favourite Villain	Duniyadari	Won	
Maharashtracha Favourite Kon?	2016	Favourite Supporting Actor	Poshter Girl	Nominated	
Maharashtracha Favourite Kon?	2017	Favourite Actor	Ventilator	Nominated	
Maharashtracha Favourite Kon?	2021	Favourite Supporting Actor	Zhakaas	Nominated	
Maharashtracha Favourite Kon?	2021	Favourite Villain	Duniyadari	Nominated	
Maharashtracha Favourite Kon?	2024	Favourite Film Critics	Godavari	Won	
Maharashtracha Favourite Kon?	2024	Favourite Actor Critics	Godavari	Won	
Maharashtracha Favourite Kon?	2024	Favourite Lyricist	Godavari (Khal Khal Goda)	Nominated	
Maharashtracha Favourite Kon?	2024	Favourite Lyricist	Godavari (Kojagiri)	Nominated	
Maharashtracha Favourite Kon?	2024	Favourite Supporting Actor	Naal 2	Nominated	
New York Indian Film Festival	2022	Best Actor	Godavari	Won	
News18 Reel Awards	2018	Best Supporting Actor	Sacred Games	Won	
Pune International Film Festival	2013	Best Actor	Tukaram	Won	
Sanskruti Kaladarpan Awards	2017	Best Actor	Ventilator	Won	
Times of India Film Awards	2025	Acting Excellence in a Negative Role in Web Films	Agni	Nominated	
TV9 Aapla Bioscope Awards	2023	Best Film	Godavari	Nominated	
TV9 Aapla Bioscope Awards	2023	Best Actor in a Lead Role	Godavari	Nominated	
TV9 Aapla Bioscope Awards	2023	Best Actor in a Lead Role (Jury)	Godavari	Won	
Zee Chitra Gaurav Puraskar	2009	Best Supporting Actor	Gulmohar	Nominated	
Zee Chitra Gaurav Puraskar	2013	Best Actor	Tukaram	Nominated	
Zee Chitra Gaurav Puraskar	2023	Best Film	Godavari	Nominated	
Zee Chitra Gaurav Puraskar	2023	Best Actor	Godavari	Nominated	
Zee Chitra Gaurav Puraskar	2023	Best Lyricist	Godavari (Khal Khal Goda)	Won	
Zee Chitra Gaurav Puraskar	2026	Best Lyricist	Aarpar (Title Track)	Nominated	
Zee Marathi Utsav Natyancha Awards	2004	Best Anchor (Male)	Campus: A Fair War	Won	
Zee Talkies Comedy Awards	2020	Best Actor	Choricha Mamla	Won	
