= Jatra: Hyalagaad Re Tyalagaad =

2006 Indian film by Kedar Shinde

Jatra
- Theatrical release poster
- Directed by: Kedar Shinde
- Written by: Kedar Shinde; Priyadarshan Jadhav; Jitendra Joshi; Hemant Edlavadkar
- Produced by: Kedar Shinde; Bela Shinde; Vijay Babu
- Starring: Bharat Jadhav; Siddhartha Jadhav; Kranti Redkar; Vijay Chavan
- Narrated by: Raj Thackeray
- Cinematography: Rahul Jadhav
- Edited by: V. N. Mayekar
- Music by: Ajay–Atul
- Release date: 28 October 2005
- Running time: 133 Minutes (Theatrical release)
- Country: India
- Language: Marathi

Jatra is a 2005 Indian Marathi-language comedy film directed and written by Kedar Shinde. The music was composed by the duo Ajay–Atul, and features the songs "Kombadi Palali" and "Ye Go Ye Ye Maina", the melodies of which were repurposed for "Chikni Chameli" and "Mera Naam Mary Hai" from the Hindi films Agneepath and Brothers respectively; both films were remakes directed by Karan Malhotra for Dharma Productions.

== Plot ==
The story is primarily about two villages called Hyalagaad(bury him) and Tyaalagaad(bury that one).The focus of the film is about the towns' attempt celebrate Jatra or religious fair. The hosting of the fair leads to a rivalry between the two villages. To determine whether Hyalagaad or Tyaalagaad hosts the fair, the towns' decide to hold a race between two individuals (Monya and Siddhu), who are willing to run, cheat and even kill for winning the rights to host the festival.

A youth called Monya played by Bharat Jadhav, who wants to become rich along with his six friends by unsavory means, arrives in the village. At the same time, his look alike who has a limited vocabulary also arrives in the same village. What follows is a comedy of errors, one liners and slapstick.

== Cast ==
- Bharat Jadhav in a dual role as Monya/Ghumya
- Siddhartha Jadhav as Siddhu; Monya's friend
- Kranti Redkar as Shevanta; Ghumya's love interest
- Vijay Chavan in a dual role as Jiva Kanole/ Shiva Kanole
- Priya Berde as Bakulabai/Akka
- Kushal Badrike as Kushya; Monya's friend
- Sanjay Khapre as Sanjya; Monya's friend
- Ganesh Revdekar as Ganya; Monya's friend
- Ramesh Wani as Ramya; Monya's friend
- Upendra Limaye as Ramdas Mali
- Viju Khote as DCP Madhav Sakhardande
- Vandana Vaknis as Shanta Jeeva Kanole
- Sunil Tawde as Inspector
- Amit Tadwalkar as Raju (voice dubbed by Meghana Erande)
- Kamlakar Satpute as Raju gang member
- Nandkishor Choughule as Raju gang member
- Jaiwant Bhalekar as Mali gang member
- Jayraj Nair as Villager
- Mahesh Kokate as Villager
- Ankush Chaudhari as Guest appearance in song "Ye Go Ye Maina"
- Deepali Sayyed as Guest appearance in song "Ye Go Ye Maina'

At the start of the film, Raj Thackeray provides the voice over as he introduces the story that unfolds.

== Music ==
All music is composed by Ajay-Atul.

No.	Title	Lyrics	Singer(s)	Length
1.	"Kombadi Palali"	Jitendra Joshi	Anand Shinde, Vaishali Samant	4:50
2.	"Ye Go Ye Ye Maina"	Priyadarshan Jadhav	Ajay Gogavle	5:04

=== Kombadi Palali ===
"Kombadi Palali" is an item number from the film. The song features Bharat Jadhav, along with Kranti Redkar, and was sung by Anand Shinde and Vaishali Samant, with music by Ajay–Atul. Jitendra Joshi wrote the lyrics to the song. The song was partially reused in the Hindi film Agneepath titled Chikni Chameli sung by Shreya Ghoshal and featuring Katrina Kaif.

=== Ye Go Ye Ye Maina ===
The song Ye Go Ye Ye Maina was reused in the Hindi film Brothers titled "Mera Naam Mary" sung by Chinmayi Sripada and featuring Kareena Kapoor. The orchestration of the song was partially modified, and an additional opening alaap was sung by Chinmayi in Mera Naam Mary.

== Reception ==
In his review of the film, Pradip Patil of Marathi Movie World considered that: ..."Kedar has pulled all the tricks to esure that viewers remains engaged. The events take place at such a fast pace that you hardly get time to think at all. The dialogues are another plus point of this film. One must give the credits to all the actors who have given such energetic performances. The movie belongs to Bharat Jadhav, Vijay Chavan and Siddharth Jadahv."

== Legacy ==
The tune from the song "Kombadi Palali" was later used by Ajay and Atul when composing the item song "Chikni Chameli" for the Hindi film Agneepath in 2012 The tune from the song "Ye Go Ye Ye Maina" was later used by Ajay and Atul in composing the item song "Mera Naam Mary Hai" for the Hindi film Brothers in 2015.
