= Agneepath (1990 film) =

1990 Indian film by Mukul Anand

- Theatrical release poster
- Directed by: Mukul S. Anand
- Screenplay by: Santosh Saroj; Kader Khan
- Story by: Santosh Saroj
- Produced by: Yash Johar
- Starring: Amitabh Bachchan; Mithun Chakraborty; Madhavi; Neelam Kothari; Danny Denzongpa; Rohini Hattangadi; Archana Puran Singh
- Cinematography: Pravin Bhatt
- Music by: Laxmikant Pyarelal
- Production company: Dharma Productions
- Distributed by: Dharma Productions
- Release date: 16 February 1990
- Running time: 181 minutes
- Country: India
- Language: Hindi
- Box office: ₹102.5 million (US$1.1 million)

Agneepath (Hindi pronunciation: [əɡnɪpətʰ], transl. The Path of Fire) is a 1990 Indian Hindi-language epic gangster action film directed by Mukul Anand, written jointly by Santosh Saroj and Kader Khan, and produced by Yash Johar. It stars Amitabh Bachchan as Vijay Deenanath Chauhan, a man who sets out to avenge the death of his father and injustices done to his family by joining the Mumbai underworld.

The film was inspired by the life of Mumbai gangster Manya Surve. The title was taken from a poem of the same name called Agneepath which was penned by Harivansh Rai Bachchan, Amitabh's father, and which is recited at the beginning of the movie and creates a thematic link that continues through the movie, both literally and metaphorically. It has also been described as a loose adaptation of Al Pacino-starrer Scarface (1983), with stylistic and thematic innovations in terms of adapting it to typical Indian sensibilities. Additionally, while Bachchan had adapted Marlon Brando's gravelly speaking style from The Godfather, the Ganpati procession at the end of the movie has been compared to the Feast of San Gennaro as depicted in The Godfather Part II.

Agneepath has grown into a strong cult film over the years. Amitabh Bachchan's performance as a crimefighter has been generally lauded and Amitabh Bachchan received his first National Film Award for Best Actor at the 38th National Film Awards for his performance. At the 36th Filmfare Awards, Mithun Chakraborty and Rohini Hattangadi won the Best Supporting Actor and the Best Supporting Actress respectively. The film, despite being the 4th highest-grosser of 1990, had collections way below its high budget, and thus, the film was unsuccessful at the box-office. The film was remade in 2012 with the same title and directed and writer by Karan Malhotra and produced by Hiroo Yash Johar and Johar's son Karan Johar, as a tribute to his father.

== Plot ==
In 1965, much-loved village schoolmaster Deenanath Chauhan strongly opposes the plans of Kancha Cheena, an underworld don, and his band of gangsters to set up a base for heroin smuggling. After being discredited in a set-up scandal by Kancha and the village landlord Dinkar Rao, Dinanath is lynched by the manipulated villagers to death, and his family is evicted and made destitute, much to Cheena's advantage. Swearing revenge over his father's murder and the attempted rape of his mother, Suhasini Chauhan, gone unpunished, and with a burning desire to clear his father's name, his son Vijay Deenanath Chauhan takes on the responsibilities of caring for his mother and sister, Shiksha Chauhan, that, by a strange twist of fate, cause him to descend into the murky underbelly of the Mumbai Underworld. He is taken by gangsters Hasmukh, Usman Bhai, and Anna Shetty under their wing. Working his way up the ladder, Vijay grows up attaining notoriety as an underworld kingpin.

In 1990, a grown-up Vijay Deenanath Chauhan is warned by police commissioner M.S. Gaitonde (who, while critical of him, nurtures a sympathetic spot for him) of a possible assassination attempt on his life by his former bosses after he refuses to co-operate with their drug-smuggling operations. However, Vijay brushes off Gaitonde's concern, stating that he is already aware of the planned attempt and intends to let it be carried out without any pre-emptive attack or resistance. Vijay's car is ambushed by his bosses, who fired multiple rounds at him. Left to die, he is discovered by a Tamilian coconut vendor, Krishnan Iyer M.A., who transports him to the hospital and saves his life, becoming his friend and eventually finding employment as Siksha's bodyguard. During his time in the hospital, Vijay is cared for by Nurse Mary Matthew. Commissioner Gaitonde deduces that Vijay basically played a gamble by letting the assassination attempt on him take place so as to elevate himself to demigod status in the perception of his followers, sending his enemies scurrying for cover. While recovering at the hospital, Krishnan saves Vijay from yet another assassination attempt at the hands of his bosses by sneaking him out of his bed.

Vijay avenges his assassination attempt by targeting the assassins one by one. He begins by killing Hasmukh and Usman Bhai, who are lodged in jail after surrendering to the police to escape Vijay's wrath. Vijay's mother strongly disapproves of his criminal tendencies and stays separately from him with Siksha. One night, when Vijay arrives for a dinner programme, his mother drives him away from home after chastising him for sullying the good name of his father. Vijay, hurt and upset, seeks solace in Mary's arms and begins a relationship with her. Siksha is then kidnapped and held in a slum by Anna Shetty, who wants to avenge the deaths of his associates killed by Vijay, and an unsuccessful rescue attempt by Krishnan ends up with the two of them brawling. Vijay hears of this and arrives to kill Anna in a fit of rage. After brutally beating up Anna, Vijay castrates him with a sword.

The close encounter between Krishnan and Siksha causes a growing intimacy between the two of them, and they fall in love with each other. Vijay is outraged and strongly protests against the relationship with his mother, but is rebuffed again when his mother disowns him and considers Krishnan the "good son" she once had. Stung and deeply hurt by this slight, Vijay seeks solace in Mary and later marries her and resolves to do things "in the right way" to gain his mother's favour.

After cutting a deal with Kancha Cheena to allow him access into his old village, Vijay sets in motion a number of strategies that undercut Cheena's criminal operations and gain him the legal ownership of the village. He kills Kanchas's henchman, Gora, who is sent by the former to assassinate Commissioner Gaitonde. He gets Dinkar Rao lynched at the hands of the debased and impoverished villagers, similar to the manner in which his father was killed. Revenge is a dish best served cold as Vijay informs Cheena of his identity as the son of Dinanath Chauhan and lands Cheena in jail by arranging for Cheena's mistress Laila to testify against Kancha in court. Laila reveals herself as Shanti, the daughter of the prostitute who helped set up Master Dinanath to discredit him, and she has been working with Vijay all along to get back to Kancha. Vijay returns the village to his mother and finds himself back in her favour, but Cheena ensures his release by arranging for the witnesses to be gunned down and Vijay's family to be kidnapped and held hostage. This is the last straw for Vijay, who is forced to return to his criminal ways and to walk the "Path of Fire" in order to rescue them. A violent and bloody struggle takes place as Cheena bombs every building and demolishes the entire village before he is killed by Vijay, who throws him into the raging fires and burns him alive. However, Vijay succumbs to the various bullet wounds inflicted on him by Kancha. While dying in the lap of his mother at the site of his family's old house, Vijay tries to justify the life he chose and the deeds he committed; that he indeed walked the "Agneepath," the "path of fire" (personifying his father's poem that was taught to him as a boy), to get justice for his family and insists that he is not a criminal. His mother weeps over his body piteously along with Krishnan, Siksha, and Mary, finally forgiving him and acknowledging that he was never a criminal.

== Cast ==
- Amitabh Bachchan as Vijay Deenanath Chauhan, Master's and Suhasini's elder son and Shiksha's elder brother.
- Master Manjunath as Young Vijay Deenanath Chauhan
- Mithun Chakraborty as Krishnan Iyer M.A.
- Madhavi as Mary Mathew
- Danny Denzongpa as Kancha Cheena, the main antagonist
- Neelam as Shiksha Deenanath Chauhan, Vijay's younger sister.
- Goga Kapoor as Dinkar Rao
- Alok Nath as Master Deenanath Chauhan, Suhasini's husband, Vijay's and Shiksha's father.
- Rohini Hattangadi as Suhasini Deenanath Chauhan, Master's wife and widow, Vijay's and Shiksha's mother.
- Sharat Saxena as Teraline
- Tinnu Anand as Nathu
- Vikram Gokhale as Commissioner M. S. Gaitonde
- Sudhir Pandey as Inspector Pathan
- Archana Puran Singh as Shanti aka Laila
- Avtar Gill as Usman Bhai
- Shammi as Tara Bai
- Bob Christo as Gora
- Shakti Kapoor as Himself in the song "Ali Baba"
- Asha Sachdev as Chanda Bai
- Deepak Shirke as Anna Shetty
- Arvind Rathod as Hasmukh
- Pradeep Rawat as Vijay's Henchman
- Anjan Srivastav as Police Constable

== Production ==
The film was inspired by the life of Mumbai don Varadarajan Mudaliar and gangster Manya Surve. Bachchan modelled his mannerisms and voice on Surve for his character. Bachchan's role of "Vijay" in this film is characterized as a "middle-aged" "Angry Young Man."

== Soundtrack ==
Part of the background score is based on French musician Jean-Michel Jarre’s electronic composition "Second Rendez-Vous" (along with portions of "Ethnicolour".)

All music is composed by Laxmikant Pyarelal.

Songs
No.	Title	Playback	Length
1.	"Kisko Tha Pata"	SP Balasubramanyam, Alka Yagnik
2.	"I Am Krishnan Iyer M. A."	SP Balasubramanyam
3.	"Ali Baba Mil Gaye Chalis Choron Se"	Runa Laila, Aadesh Shrivastava
4.	"Ganpati Apne Gaon Chale"	Sudesh Bhosle, Kavita Krishnamurthy, Anupama Deshpande

== Reception ==
Upon release the film received polarized reviews. Film Trade Analyst Komal Nahta wrote about Bachchan's voice: "But the biggest undoing of the film is Amitabh Bachchan’s voice. He has spoken the dialogue in a different voice (similar to what Marlon Brando did in The Godfather) which will not be accepted by the audience. Further the mixing not being clear, his dialogues are incomprehensible at places." He further wrote that the film lacked a gripping drama, well-set script, and that even the murder scenes lacked excitement. Rediff.com's review of Agneepath suggested that perhaps, the grim, violent, aggressive, and dark portrayal of the underbelly of Bombay's underworld had worked against the film.

However, the perception of the film changed gradually over the years. Karan Johar recounts in an interview how younger city-based audiences thought it was a cool film. The film's review in Rediff.com, mentioned that: "Agneepath, despite its amplified sentimentality, strong language and violence works on account of this very dynamism. "

== Awards ==
Year	Nominee / work	Award	Result
1990	Amitabh Bachchan	National Film Award for Best Actor	Won
1990	Mithun Chakraborty	Filmfare Award for Best Supporting Actor	Won
1990	Rohini Hattangadi	Filmfare Award for Best Supporting Actress	Won

== Remakes and legacy ==
In an interview with The Times of India, Karan Johar explained that he had the intention of remaking the original Agneepath ever since the film released 22 years ago, because according to him, the failure of the film broke his father's heart. The idea of the remake materialised on the sets of Johar's film My Name Is Khan in which Karan Malhotra was an associate director. Johar told Malhotra his desire to remake the original film and asked him to revisit it again, to which he agreed immediately.

Hrithik Roshan played the role of Vijay Deenanath Chauhan and Sanjay Dutt plays the role of the Kancha Cheena. Priyanka Chopra was the female lead. The character of Krishnan Iyer played by Mithun Chakraborty in the original was removed and Rishi Kapoor played a newly introduced negative character, Rauf Lala. Other members of the cast include Om Puri and Zarina Wahab among others.

The film was also modified and remade in Tamil as Sivasakthi, directed by Suresh Krissna.

Agnipath Meri Atmakatha, the Hindi translation of In the Line of Fire: A Memoir, a 2006 autobiography by then President of Pakistan Pervez Musharraf was titled after the film, who was reported have liked Amitabh Bacchan. Agnipath Scheme, an Indian Military recruitment program launched by the government of India in 2022, was taken to be named after the poem by Harivansh Rai Bachchan and the film.
