= Don Special =

Don Special (दोन स्पेशल, टचस्क्रीनच्या गर्दीतून शाईपेनच्या दुनियेत नेणारा) is a Marathi play by Kshitij Patwardhan. The story concerns an editor, Milind Bhagwat, and takes place in a newspaper office in Pune, India, in 1989.

== Cast ==
- Girija Oak Godbole
- Jitendra Joshi
- Rohit Haldikar
