= Mardini (film) =

2026 Indian Marathi-language drama film

- Directed by: Ajay Mayekar
- Written by: Mahabaleshwar Narvekar
- Produced by: Deepti Talpade
- Starring: Prarthana Behere; Abhijeet Khandkekar; Jitendra Joshi
- Cinematography: Shabbir Naik
- Edited by: Abhishek Seth
- Music by: Hitesh Modak; Background Score: Sanket Patil
- Production companies: Affluence Motion Pictures; ODI Group
- Distributed by: Sunshinez Studio
- Release date: 3 July 2026
- Running time: 128 minutes
- Country: India
- Language: Marathi

Mardini (transl. The Destroyer) is a 2026 Indian Marathi-language drama film directed by Ajay Mayekar in his directorial debut, presented by Shreyas Talpade and produced by Deepti Talpade under the banners of Affluence Motion Pictures and ODI Group. The film stars Prarthana Behere, Abhijeet Khandkekar and Jitendra Joshi in pivotal roles. It centers on a single mother who goes to great lengths to protect her young daughter after a scam disrupts their lives.

The film was released theatrically on 3 July 2026 and upon release received mixed response.

== Plot ==
Anjali, a single mother deserted by her husband years earlier, lives with her young daughter Ovi and her own mother. Ovi is asthmatic and, on medical advice, Anjali buys an oxygen machine online with the help of a colleague. When the machine turns out to be non-functional, she lodges a complaint with the police, and sub-inspector Vikrant Surve investigates. Anjali soon receives a call from an unknown person she believes supplied the faulty machine; when she confronts him, he threatens to kill Ovi. As fear takes hold, Anjali draws on her inner strength to protect her child and uncover the identity of the caller.

== Cast ==
- Prarthana Behere as Anjali Ghorpade
- Abhijeet Khandkekar as Inspector Vikrant Surve
- Jitendra Joshi as Senior Police Officer Suryakant Gaitonde
- Rajesh Bhosale as Chandu
- Myra Vaikul as Ovi
- Sandhya Mhatre as Anjali's mother
- Vinayak Bhave as R.V.
- Swati Bowalekar as Aaji
- Sonali Patil as Vishakha
- Bhushan Telang as Badadare
- Ayush Jain as young Vikrant
- Shraddha Satam as Vikrant’s maternal aunt
- Ramesh Rokade as Vikrant’s maternal uncle
- Shashikant Gandhe as Shirodkar Kaka

== Production ==
Mardini marks the directorial debut of Ajay Mayekar, who had previously worked in Marathi television. The film was produced by Deepti Talpade with Tina Rakesh Kothari as co-producer, and was presented by actor Shreyas Talpade, marking his return as a producer after a gap of several years.

The project reunited Behere, Talpade and child artist Myra Vaikul with director Mayekar, who had earlier worked together on the Zee Marathi television series Majhi Tujhi Reshimgath (2021–2023).

== Music ==
The film's music was composed by Hitesh Modak, while the background score was composed by Sanket Patil. Ahmed Khan choreographed the song "Majhi Aai Mardini", marking his debut as a choreographer for a Marathi film.

== Release ==
The first-look motion poster, carrying the tagline "Aai Tari Tila Kon Maari" and revealing the release date, was unveiled on 4 May 2026, followed by the trailer in June 2026. Mardini was released theatrically on 3 July 2026 in Marathi, with English subtitles for wider reach.

== Reception ==
Santosh Bhingarde of Sakal awarded the film 3.5 out of 5 stars, writing, "Mardini conveys an important message while commenting on the dangers of today's digital age." Maharashtra Times gave the film 3 out of 5 stars, describing it as an honest attempt to portray the strength of motherhood. The review praised the performances of Prarthana Behere and Abhijeet Khandkekar, stating, "This film, which provides an emotional experience along with entertainment, is memorable for its content, but it does not seem to leap to its full potential." Writing for Loksatta, Reshma Raikwar observed, "Mardini can be seen as a film that makes us realize how easy and equally frightening this math of injustice and oppression has been made by technology."
