= Agni (2024 film) =

Indian action thriller film

- Official release poster
- Directed by: Rahul Dholakia
- Written by: Rahul Dholakia; Vijay Maurya
- Produced by: Ritesh Sidhwani; Farhan Akhtar
- Starring: Pratik Gandhi; Divyenndu; Saiyami Kher; Jitendra Joshi; Kabir Shah
- Cinematography: K. U. Mohanan
- Edited by: Deepa Bhatia
- Music by: John Stewart Eduri
- Production company: Excel Entertainment
- Distributed by: Amazon MGM Studios (via Amazon Prime Video)
- Release date: 6 December 2024
- Running time: 124 minutes
- Country: India
- Language: Hindi

Agni (transl. Fire) is a 2024 Indian Hindi-language action thriller written and directed by Rahul Dholakia. The film is produced by Ritesh Sidhwani and Farhan Akhtar under Excel Entertainment in association with Amazon MGM Studios and stars Pratik Gandhi, Divyenndu, Jitendra Joshi, Saiyami Kher and Kabir Shah in lead roles. Agni was released on 6 December 2024 on Amazon Prime Video to positive reviews.

== Premise ==
In a city plagued by an unexplained rise in fires, Vithal, a brave firefighter, reluctantly teams up with his brother-in-law, Samit, a skilled but stubborn policeman, to get to the bottom of the escalating crisis. As tensions mount and time runs short, the two must put aside their personal differences to solve the mystery and shield Mumbai from looming catastrophe.

== Cast ==
- Pratik Gandhi as Vitthalrao Dhonduba Surve, Chief of Parel Fire Station
- Divyenndu as Sr. Inspector Samit Sawant "Samya", Vitthal's brother-in-law
- Jitendra Joshi as Fire Officer Mahadev Nigde
- Saiyami Kher as Fire Officer Avni Purohit
- Sai Tamhankar as Rukmini "Ruku" Surve, Vitthal's wife
- Udit Arora as Fire Officer Joseph "Jazz"
- Kabir Shah as Amar "Amya", Vitthal and Rukmini's son
- Sakhi Gokhale as Sayali, Samit's wife
- Anant Jog as Deputy CM Tipnis
- Pramod Pathak as Pankaj Mishra
- Paritosh Tiwari as Torch
- Kanchan Pagare as Kamble
- Abhishek Khandekar as Tawde
- Sushant Shetty as Surya
