= Sivasakthi =

- Poster
- Directed by: Suresh Krissna
- Written by: Balakumaran (dialogues)
- Screenplay by: Suresh Krissna
- Story by: Santosh Saroj
- Produced by: M. G. Sekar; S. Santhanam
- Starring: Sathyaraj; Prabhu; Rambha
- Cinematography: V. Pratap
- Edited by: B. Lenin; V. T. Vijayan
- Music by: Deva
- Production company: M. G. Pictures
- Release date: 6 September 1996
- Running time: 140 minutes
- Country: India
- Language: Tamil

Sivasakthi is a 1996 Indian Tamil-language crime film directed by Suresh Krissna. The film stars Sathyaraj, Prabhu and Rambha. It was released on 6 September 1996.

== Plot ==
Marc Zuber Antony, alias Tony (Mahesh Anand), an international smuggler, ended up on an isolated island after killing some navy officers. He decided to hide his merchandises there, and he threatened the people of the island. In the process, Tony killed the island's school teacher (Girish Karnad) in front of his wife, his son Siva and his daughter Priya.

Many years later, Siva (Sathyaraj) becomes a rich man in the city and lives with his sister Priya (Rambha) and his mother (Sujatha). Siva is haunted by his father's murder, and he tries to take revenge with the help of his friend Anbu (Nizhalgal Ravi). In the meantime, Priya falls in love with a happy-go-lucky man Sakthi (Prabhu). Later, Siva appoints Sakthi, and he becomes his best friend.

One day, Siva kills in front of his mother Tony's henchman, and he reveals to his mother that he is, in fact, a smuggler. Shocked after hearing this, his mother and his sister Priya leave his house, and they decide to move into Sakthi's house.

Actually, Sakthi is an undercover police officer who tries to arrest Siva. Tony was supposed to be dead, according to the police report, but Sakthi finds out that he is not dead. The rest of the story is about what happens to Siva, Sakthi, Priya and Tony.

== Cast ==
- Sathyaraj as Siva
- Prabhu as Sakthi
- Rambha as Priya
- Sujatha as Siva's mother
- Mahesh Anand as Marc Zuber Antony alias Tony
- Nizhalgal Ravi as Anbu
- Girish Karnad as Siva's father
- Ragasudha as Vandana
- K. S. Jayalakshmi as Kameswari
- R. N. K. Prasad as R. N. K. Prasad
- Jaya Prahasam as Gaja
- Mohan V. Ram
- Devayani in a guest appearance

== Soundtrack ==
The music was composed by Deva, with lyrics written by Vairamuthu.

Song	Singer(s)	Length
"Chumma Chumma"	S. P. Balasubrahmanyam, Ragini Santhanam	4:30
"Mannin Mainthan"	S. P. Balasubrahmanyam	0:40
"My Name Is Sakthi"	S. P. Balasubrahmanyam	3:20
"Na Dhin Dhinna"	Swarnalatha, Mano	3:10
"Naan Oru Ladka"	S. P. Balasubrahmanyam, K. S. Chithra	3:40

== Reception ==
R. P. Aa. of Kalki called it hundred percent Sathyaraj's show, called Rambha's presence as cool relief but felt Prabhu was terribly wasted and Balakumaran's dialogues lack his touch and concluded the review by requesting Suresh Krishna that why don't he remember his mentor K. Balachander before beginning every film.
