= Beti No.1 =

Beti No. 1
- Beti No.1
- Directed by: T. Rama Rao
- Written by: Santosh Saroj
- Story by: Rafi-Mecartin
- Based on: Aadyathe Kanmani by Rafi-Mecartin
- Produced by: Nilesh Dadhich; Rajeev Kumar
- Starring: Govinda; Rambha; Aruna Irani; Prem Chopra
- Cinematography: Dr. Prasad Babu
- Edited by: Tony Glaad
- Music by: Viju Shah
- Distributed by: S K Enterprise Haslingden LTD
- Release date: 10 November 2000
- Country: India
- Language: Hindi

Beti No.1 (transl. Daughter No.1) is a 2000 Indian Hindi-language comedy drama film, written by Santosh Saroj and directed by T. Rama Rao. The film was released on 10 November 2000. It is a remake of the Malayalam film Aadyathe Kanmani.

The film stars Govinda, Rambha, Aruna Irani and Johnny Lever, while Prem Chopra, Ashok Saraf, Laxmikant Berde and Rakesh Bedi appear in supporting roles. Well known villain Prem Chopra played a rare positive role in this film. The film opened to highly negative reviews and flopped.

== Plot ==
The story of Beti No.1 deals with how our society has given women a very inferior position. It is the story of Durga Devi (Aruna Irani) whose hen-pecked husband Dashrath Bhatnagar is a gharjamai. The couple has three sons, Ram (Ashok Saraf), Laxman (Laxmikant Berde) and Bharat (Govinda). Durga Devi has said that she will bequeath all her wealth to her first grandson however her first two sons, Ram and Laxman who are both married have so far only produced daughters. Due to this, both the wives and their daughters are shunned from the family.

In the meantime, the youngest son Bharat starts to romance Priya (Rambha), a girl of poor stock who works at a telephone booth. They fall in love, however, Durga Devi objects to Bharat engaging in a relationship with an impoverished girl. To prevent Durga Devi from discovering their relationship, Bharat's father, Dashrath (Prem Chopra), provides him and Priya with two lakhs, and they subsequently marry. They live happily together until Durga Devi discovers that they have been deceiving her, and she lashes out at Dashrath and Bharat. Durga Devi fires her maid and makes the new bride, Priya do all the household chores.

As time passes, Priya falls pregnant and is foretold that her child will bring great happiness to the family by Durga Devi's father. Everyone assumes that this means Priya is carrying a son as a daughter could not possibly bring happiness to the family. Durga Devi's behaviour suddenly changes towards Priya and Priya is treated like a princess as she is carrying the requisite heir. However, on a visit to the doctor, Bharat and Priya are informed that they are having a girl and not a son. They soon realise that if Durga Devi ever finds out that they are having a girl then she will once again treat Priya poorly so they decide to play along with the story that she is having a boy. At the time of Priya's delivery, Bharat's friend Mulayamchand's wife is also having a baby. Both wives go into labour together with Priya delivering a girl and Mullu's wife delivering a boy. Durga Devi suddenly collapses and ends up in the same hospital. Bharat's Father sees Bharat holding Mullu's son in his arms, mistakes him for his grandson and runs with the child to revive the ailing Durga Devi. Three days later, Durga Devi insists on taking her son home. Bharat persuades Mullu and his wife to live closer to their home and convinces Mullu and his wife to let them keep their son during the day and would be returned to them during the night and in turn they could keep their daughter during the day and would be taken back at night.

The story goes on and on with the two mothers running from house to house trying to soothe their own respective child until one day they are caught by Durga Devi where she comes to the clichéd realisation that she made a mistake in wanting a son and accepts her granddaughters.

== Cast ==
- Govinda as Bharat D. Bhatnagar
- Rambha as Priya Bhatnagar
- Aruna Irani as Durga D. Bhatnagar
- Ashok Saraf as Ram D. Bhatnagar
- Laxmikant Berde as Laxman D. Bhatnagar
- Prem Chopra as Dashrath Bhatnagar
- Rakesh Bedi as Bachalal
- Birbal as G.K. Exports Employee
- Avtar Gill as Ramakant Sinha
- Mohan Joshi as Raghuveer Yadav
- Satyendra Kapoor as Priya's Father
- Razak Khan as Talwar Singh Chura
- Johnny Lever as Mulayamchand a.k.a. Mullu
- Ram Mohan as Bhima Shankar
- Ashalata Wabgaonkar as Priya's Mother
- Guddi Maruti as Mullu's Maid

== Soundtrack ==
Beti No.1

Soundtrack album by Viju Shah
- Released: 1999
- Genre: Feature film soundtrack
- Length: 34 Min 64 Sec
- Label: T-Series
- Producers: T. Rama Rao; Abdul Zahid Shah; Ashok Malhotra; Satyam Vagnan; Aniruddha Baneerji

The soundtrack of Beti No.1 is composed by Viju Shah and Lyrics Penned By Maya Govind and Dev Kohli. The film has 7 original songs, The soundtrack was released in 1999 By T-Series ."Mehfil Taa Sajdi" is an exact copy of a Pakistani Punjabi song sung by Musarat Nazir by the same name.

=== Track list ===
Song	Singer(s)	Lyrics	Length
"Tune Jo Liya Mera Chumma"	Abhijeet Bhattacharya, Anuradha Paudwal	Maya Govind, Dev Kohli	5:23
"Dilruba O Phoolon"	Udit Narayan, Anuradha Paudwal	Maya Govind, Dev Kohli	5:17
"Palkon Pe Aao"	Kumar Sanu, Kavita Krishnamurthy	Nawab Arzoo, Dev Kohli	5:11
"Dil Se Dil Takraya"	Kumar Sanu, Kavita Krishnamurthy	Nawab Arzoo, Dev Kohli	4:35
"Dil Ki Dhadkan"	Udit Narayan, Amit Kumar	Maya Govind, Dev Kohli	4:25
"Chori Chori Aankh"	Anuradha Paudwal, Javed Ali	Maya Govind, Dev Kohli	5:53
"Mehfil Taa Sajdi"	Viju Shah, Udit Narayan, Bhupinder	Maya Govind, Dev Kohli	4:03

== Box office ==
Although a film directed by an established director Rama Rao and written by Santosh Saroj (who also wrote Agneepath), the film was a huge disaster at the box office.
