= Brothers (2015 film) =

2015 Indian film by Karan Malhotra

- Theatrical release poster
- Directed by: Karan Malhotra
- Written by: Screenplay: Ekta Pathak Malhotra; Dialogues: Siddharth-Garima
- Story by: Adapted Story: Karan Malhotra; Ekta Pathak Malhotra; Original Story: Cliff Dorfman; Gavin O'Connor
- Based on: Warrior by Gavin O'Connor
- Produced by: Hiroo Yash Johar; Karan Johar; Endemol India
- Starring: Akshay Kumar; Sidharth Malhotra; Jacqueline Fernandez
- Cinematography: Hemant Chaturvedi
- Edited by: Akiv Ali
- Music by: Ajay–Atul
- Production companies: Fox Star Studios; Lionsgate; Dharma Productions; Endemol India
- Distributed by: Fox Star Studios
- Release date: 14 August 2015
- Running time: 155 minutes
- Countries: India; United States
- Language: Hindi
- Box office: ₹140.3 crore

Brothers is a 2015 Hindi-language sports action drama film, based on Mixed Martial arts (MMA) directed by Karan Malhotra and produced by Dharma Productions, Lionsgate Films and Endemol India. A co-production between India and the United States, it is an official remake of the 2011 American film Warrior, it stars Akshay Kumar and Sidharth Malhotra with Jacqueline Fernandez, Jackie Shroff and Shefali Shah in supporting roles.

The first look poster of the film was released on 9 March 2015 and film was released on 14 August 2015 on Independence Day weekend.

== Plot ==
The film opens in medias res where street fighting issues are raised in Mumbai. Sports chairman Peter Braganza expresses his desire of making street fighting a legal sport and decides to open a league called Right 2 Fight (R2F). Meanwhile, imprisoned Garson "Gary" Fernandes, a recovering alcoholic and former MMA expert under rehabilitation, is released from his jail term, and his younger son Monty comes to pick him up. Monty gets tensed when his father asks about his elder son David and takes him away to their home. At home, Gary acts protective of all the belongings of his wife, Maria, who died many years ago. David, now a physics teacher, has a daughter with a kidney ailment. Unable to arrange money from the bank and other sources, he starts to earn money through street fights, as he was once a promising MMA fighter when he was younger. This stresses out his wife, Jenny, as she is worried about David. Meanwhile, Gary, who misses his wife Maria, starts hallucinating about her and violently attacks a mirror from self-hating about how he destroyed his family. Monty rushes to stop and comfort his father, realizing how much regret he has. Gary then tries to meet David, but the latter ends up throwing Monty and Gary out of his house in a rage after Gary sees his granddaughter and learns David named her after his mother, Maria.

Over a flashback, Monty is revealed to be Gary's illegitimate child. Maria nevertheless loved Monty, as she did David. The two brothers had a close, loving relationship until David was 23 and Monty was 15. On the night of Monty's 15th birthday, Gary came home drunk and apologized to Maria for destroying the family, but mentioned his lover Sarah's name, instead of Maria's. An enraged Maria confronted Gary about this, and in a drunken state, Gary hit Maria, who was injured from hitting her head on the furniture and died. A furious David pushed Gary aside; when Monty came close to Maria, who reached out to him before passing, David angrily pushed him away, holding his father and half-brother equally responsible for his mother's death. This is what created the rift between Gary, Monty, and David.

David later loses his job in school when principal Shobhit Desai learns about David's involvement in street fights. Monty, who wants to be a fighter, is then introduced to Suleiman Pasha, a fighting agent who is old friends with Gary, as they trained together. Suleiman fixes a match with Mustafa in which Monty is defeated. This enrages Gary, but Monty asks for a rematch with Mustafa, where Monty brutally defeats Mustafa after listening to his father’s advice and is declared a selected fighter for R2F by Peter. The fight is recorded and uploaded to YouTube, and soon Monty becomes an internet sensation. Monty undergoes training to become the R2F champion. Meanwhile, David, too, decides to be a full-time fighter, and Jenny encourages him to do so. Suleiman is initially unconvinced by David but arranges a match while Monty celebrates his victory at a bar. David is soon victorious in the fight and is accepted for R2F after convincing Suleiman of his true potential. R2F begins its grand debut and soon becomes a sensation as fighters from all over the world show their interest in the league. Monty easily defeats his opponents till he goes up against Luca, a fighter who is notorious for brutally knocking out his opponents(Gama and Potter) but manages to knock him out, shocking the audience as he becomes the first finalist. Meanwhile David the underdog comes up with a robust game plan to outlast his opponents (Ronnie and Tenzin) to reach the semis. There, he fights Hammer; an aggressive fighter who kicks the cage, injuring Gary. This leads to David going in all out attack mode to violently assault Hammer in retaliation, and he too advances to the finale. After beating their last opponents the brothers are now the finalists and their identities as siblings are revealed to the public causing massive media coverage for the R2F.

Gary, feeling guilty about his sons fighting each other instead of loving one another because of his mistake, leaves the arena. Jenny, David’s students, principal, and everyone back at Suleiman’s fight club watch the match, which becomes brutal from the heated rivalry between the brothers. Monty proves dominant in striking and throws in cheap shots to taunt David, Gary heads back to the arena when he sees the fight. During the fight, David breaks Monty's shoulder, which causes David concern as Monty refuses to give up. Gary rushes towards the cage and apologizes for his mistakes, and tells David not to direct his anger towards his brother. Monty continues to fight despite David’s plea to stop. David gets Monty in a rear-naked chokehold and tells Monty not to fight anymore. Monty, in turn, tells David to continue to choke him because David is selfish and never considered how Monty felt that night, telling him Maria was also his mother and how lonely he was without her and David in his life. David moved to tears, now realizing how much pain he caused to his brother finally apologizes, and Monty allows David to win the championship. David takes Monty in his arms, and both brothers walk backstage, now having finally reconciled.

== Cast ==
- Akshay Kumar as David Fernandes, Gary and Maria's oldest son, who was once a physics teacher turned MMA fighter to help support his wife and daughter. He is equivalent to Brendan Conlon, who was portrayed by Joel Edgerton in the original film.
  - Meghan Jadhav as teenage David Fernandes
    - Aarsh Gyani as childhood David Fernandes
- Sidharth Malhotra as Monty Fernandes, Gary's illegitimate son, and David's half-brother. He was the son of Gary's lover Sarah and is now an aggressive fighter who drinks just like his father. He is equivalent to Tommy Conlon, who was portrayed by Tom Hardy.
  - Prateik Bhanushali as teenager Monty Fernandes
- Jacqueline Fernandez as Jenny Fernandes, David's wife who fears David fighting in the R2F Tournament to help support her and their daughter. She is equivalent to Tess Conlon, who was portrayed by Jennifer Morrison.
- Jackie Shroff as Garson "Gary" Fernandes, David and Monty's father, who was once an alcoholic, now turned sober. He now trains Monty for the R2F Tournament. He is equivalent to Paddy Conlon, who was played by Nick Nolte.
- Shefali Shah as Maria Fernandes Sr., Gary's wife, David's biological mother and Monty's stepmother who dies during a scuffle with her drunk husband and is unable to prevent David from turning against Monty who he nevertheless loves deeply.
- Ashutosh Rana as Suleiman Pasha, the coach owner of an underground fight club who now mentors David for the R2F. He is equivalent to Frank Campana, who was played by Frank Grillo.
- Kiran Kumar as Peter Braganza (Former Mixed Martial Art Champion and now a Chairman)
- Kulbhushan Kharbanda as Principal Shobhit Desai, the school principal who suspended David from his job as a physics teacher from school without pay. He is equivalent to Principal Joe Zito, who was played by Kevin Dunn.
- Rajendranath Zutshi as Baaz Raut, ex-fighter - commentator 1
- Kavi Shastri as Sachin Nehra, a sports journalist - commentator 2
- Ashok Lokhande as Gary's best friend and Monty's coach, the coach owner of a fight club where Monty trains. He is equivalent to Colt Boyd, who was played by Maximiliano Hernández.
- Harssh A. Singh as Santosh Desai, News Anchor
- Conan Stevens as Luca
- Shad Gaspard as Ronnie Cross
- Naisha Khanna as Maria "Popo" Fernandes Jr., David's and Jenny's daughter
- Zubin Vicky Driver as Swami
- Abbas Hyder as Suleman
- Honey Sharma as Mustafa
- Ramneeka Dhillon Lobo as Suzan
- Kareena Kapoor Khan as Mary (item number "Mera Naam Mary Hai")

== Production ==
=== Development ===
Brothers was announced in late August 2014 by producer Karan Johar on his Twitter account; the film would mark the first collaboration of Akshay Kumar with both Johar and Fox Star Studios, as well as the second co-production between Johar's Dharma Productions and Fox Star Studios after Johar's directorial venture My Name Is Khan, for which actor Sidharth Malhotra had served as an assistant director. Special stunt co-ordinators Eric Brown and Justin Yu from Los Angeles choreographed the film's stunt and MMA sequences.

For the role of an MMA fighter, Kumar had taken up a weight-specific diet and shot scenes depicting his actual workout. He also underwent a six-month training of several martial art forms including judo, kyūdō, aikido, and karate.

Malhotra trained in Jujitsu and aikido. It was speculated that he gained 10 kilograms for the role.

=== Marketing ===
Vroovy a joint venture of Hungama and Gameshastra had released the 3D video game titled Brothers: Clash of Fighters available for Android phones.

== Soundtrack ==
Brothers

Soundtrack album by Ajay–Atul
- Released: 24 July 2015
- Recorded: 2015
- Genre: Feature film soundtrack
- Length: 27:56
- Language: Hindi
- Label: Sony Music
- Producer: Ajay–Atul

Ajay–Atul chronology
Benjo (2015)	Brothers (2015)	Sairat (2016)

Music videos
- "Mera Naam Mary Hai" on YouTube

The soundtrack of the album is composed by Ajay–Atul, while the lyrics are written by Amitabh Bhattacharya. Critic Joginder Tuteja from Bollywood Hungama gave 3 stars of 5, quoting, "The music of Brothers doesn't really go all the way when it comes to good expectations that came from it being a big chartbuster album in the making. However, from a situational numbers perspective, it does well to keep you engaged for the most part of it. Expect the 'Brothers Anthem' to haunt you all the more once you are through experiencing it with the film." Kasmin Fernandes from Times of India rated 3 out of 5 with mixed reviews. The song "Mera Naam Mary Hai" is a cover version of "Ye Go Ye Ye Maina", which was composed by the same composers from the Marathi film Jatra: Hyalagaad Re Tyalagaad.

All music is composed by Ajay–Atul.

Track listing
No.	Title	Singers	Length
1.	"Brothers Anthem"	Vishal Dadlani	05:53
2.	"Gaaye Jaa" (Female Version)	Shreya Ghoshal	05:42
3.	"Sapna Jahan"	Sonu Nigam, Neeti Mohan	05:41
4.	"Mera Naam Mary Hai"	Chinmayi Sripada	05:11
5.	"Gaaye Jaa" (Male Version)	Mohammed Irfan	05:29
6.	"Brothers Mashup" (DJ Kiran Kamath Mashup)	Chinmayi Sripada, Sonu Nigam, Vishal Dadlani, Shreya Ghoshal, Neeti Mohan, Mohammed Irfan	04:49
Total length:			32:45

== Reception ==
Film critic Subhash K Jha gave 4 stars out of 5 and said "Brothers may not appeal to those who look for laughter in times of despair. There is barely room for a whiff of a smile in this dark sanguinary and seductive tale of destruction and redemption told in a free-wheeling style that accommodates derivations and innovations without apology or awkwardness." The Times of India (TOI) gave 3 stars out of 5. Bollywood Hungama gave 3 stars out of 5.

Film critic Raja Sen for Rediff wrote, "Weighing 158 unbearable minutes, Brothers is nearly 600-times as long as the Rousey win – and not one-millionth as thrilling." Sen reviewed the characters of the film and concluded, "But that's all this film has, a ball-busting Kumar and one particular fight that ends with delightful abruptness. Everything else is exhausting." He gave the film 1.5 stars out of 5. Saibal Chatterjee of NDTV opines, "For all the hoopla, Brothers, in going for the jugular, punches well below its weight. It makes so much noise that any sensible point about brotherly bonding and filial fidelity that it might be trying to make is completely drowned out by the decibels. Take your earplugs along." He gave the film 2.5 stars out of 5. Anuj Kumar of The Hindu newspaper reviewed, "The problem is, be it emotion or action, Karan is in no hurry to say cut. At times it works for the emotion to seep in, but many times, over-elaboration dilutes the punch. The music is a letdown. Kareena Kapoor deserved a better song and choreography for the special appearance." Shubhra Gupta of The Indian Express summarized, "Akshay Kumar, Sidharth Malhotra's film gets dragged down by its over-wrought mawkishness." At Firstpost, critic Deepanjana Pal stated, "Akshay Kumar is hot but with Jackie Shroff and Sidharth Malhotra this film is a hot mess. A few more films like Brothers and Bollywood will have achieved what no amount of litigation can manage — the freedom to copy freely. Because if Gavin O'Connor, who directed and co-wrote Warrior, ever sees how his story has been brutalized, he might just go on a campaign claiming that intellectual property rights be damned, Hollywood is better off not being associated; with Bollywood remakes."

== Box office ==
Brothers made Rs.52.08 crore in its opening weekend in India. The film brought in ₹15.36 crore (US$1.6 million) internationally. Adding the film's gross India business of 70.30 crores, after week one Brothers' worldwide business stands at 106 crores at the box office.

=== India ===
In the season where films have started doing well at the box office, Brothers have managed to find an audience for itself over the weekend. If the start was good, if not phenomenal, there was some good escalation waiting to take place for the rest of the weekend. Saturday was always going to be the key for the film, and the Karan Malhotra film managed to cross the 21 crore mark. Sunday did not see as many footfalls as Saturday but still did better than Friday, as a result of which 52.08 crores came in once the weekend was through. Brothers made quite a low business on its 3rd day, i.e., 1st Sunday at the box office. The movie collected 15.45 crores on Sunday, which is almost equal to its Friday business (15.20 crores). Nevertheless, thanks to its super jump on Day 2, the film's overall opening weekend collections have come to a good amount of 52.08 crores. The film now stands as the 2nd Highest Weekend Grosser of the year. Bajrangi Bhaijaan, with 102.60 crores, holds the record of Top weekend grosser of 2015. The film went on to collect just 64.80 crores net in its first week in India which is a poor result because it has a big holiday. Brothers crashed 88% in its second weekend as it grossed just 5.25 crore net approx in its second weekend. The ten days business of film is just 69.83 crores. Brothers grossed 80 lakhs net on its second Monday and has grossed just 6 crore net approx in its first four days of the second week.

=== Overseas ===
Brothers performed poorly overseas but managed to garner around $2.4 million in the first weekend; the Persian Gulf region, Pakistan, USA, and UK were the top markets. Brothers did $3.6 million after 12 days.
