= Santosh Saroj =

Indian screenwriter

Santosh Saroj is a Bollywood screenwriter and dialogue writer mostly known for films like 'Agneepath (1990)', 'Shahenshah (1988)' and 'Major Saab (1998)'. His last film as writer was Sirf, released in 2008. He was also assistant director for films like 'Mausam (1975)' and 'Raaste Ka Patthar'. He has also directed two films "Waqt Waqt ki Baat" & "Pyar Mein Sauda Nahin" .

== Filmography ==
- Kaalia - Screenplay - 1981
- Bulundi - Screenplay- 1981
- Pyar Mein Sauda Nahin - Screenplay - 1982
- Waqt Waqt ki Baat - Story & Screenplay - 1982
- Shahenshah-Screenplay-1988
- Ek Hi Maqsad-Screenplay & Dialogue-1988
- Agneepath-Story & Screenplay-1990
- Aaj Ka Arjun - Screenplay - 1990
- Doodh Ka Karz-Story & Screenplay-1990
- Izzat - Screenplay and Dialogues - 1991
- Khuda Gawah-Story, Screenplay, Dialogues-1992
- Police Officer - Story, Screenplay and Dialogues - 1992
- Phool Aur Angaar - Story, Screenplay and Dialogues - 1993
- Aadmi-Screenplay & Dialogue-1993
- Jai Kishen - Screenplay & Dialogue - 1994
- Kranti Kshetra-Story, Screenplay and Dialogues-1994
- Aa Gale Lag Jaa-Story, Screenplay, Dialogues -1994
- Baazi - Dialogue - 1995
- Vijeta-Screenplay and Dialogues-1996
- Jung-Story, Screenplay, Dialogues-1996
- Krishna- Screenplay & Dialogues-1996
- Raja Ki Aayegi Baaraat - Story, Screenplay and Dialogues - 1996
- Major Saab-Screenplay and Dialogues-1998
- Gair-Dialogues-1999
- Krodh-Screenplay-2000
- Badal-Dialogues-2000
- Beti No 1-Story, Screenplay, Dialogues-2000
- Ek Hindustani-Story, Screenplay, Dialogues-2003

== Personal life ==
His collaboration with Mukul Anand was most successful, Films like Agneepath & Khuda Gawah. He wrote for Tinu Anand, Film's Like Kaalia, Shahenshah & Major Saab .Santosh Saroj is mostly known for Agneepath(1990).
