= Agneepath (2012 film) =

2012 Indian film by Karan Malhotra

- Theatrical release poster
- Directed by: Karan Malhotra
- Screenplay by: Karan Malhotra; Ila Bedi Dutta
- Dialogues by: Piyush Mishra
- Story by: Original Story: Santosh Saroj; Curated Story: Karan Malhotra
- Based on: Agneepath (1990) by Mukul S. Anand
- Produced by: Hiroo Yash Johar; Karan Johar
- Starring: Hrithik Roshan; Sanjay Dutt; Rishi Kapoor; Priyanka Chopra; Om Puri; Zarina Wahab
- Cinematography: Kiran Deohans; Ravi K. Chandran
- Edited by: Akiv Ali
- Music by: Ajay–Atul
- Production company: Dharma Productions
- Distributed by: AA Films; Eros International
- Release date: 26 January 2012
- Running time: 174 minutes
- Country: India
- Language: Hindi
- Budget: ₹58 crore
- Box office: est. ₹193 crore

Agneepath (Hindi pronunciation: [əɡnɪpətʰ], transl. The Path of Fire) is a 2012 Indian Hindi-language action crime film written and directed by Karan Malhotra (in his directorial debut) and produced by Hiroo Yash Johar and Karan Johar under the Dharma Productions banner. A remake of Mukul S. Anand's 1990 film of the same name, the film stars Hrithik Roshan and Sanjay Dutt with Rishi Kapoor, Priyanka Chopra, Om Puri and Zarina Wahab in supporting roles. Roshan reprises the role of Amitabh Bachchan as Vijay Deenanath Chauhan, a migrant from the island village of Mandwa, seeking revenge for his father's defamation and murder orchestrated by Kancha Cheena, Dutt reprising the role from the original where Danny Denzongpa essayed him, befriending Rauf Lala (Rishi Kapoor), an underworld gangster, in the process.

Seeking to "avenge" the original classic's commercial failure, Karan Johar had harboured intentions of remaking his father's Agneepath ever since its release. Believing that he was not qualified to direct an action film, Karan Johar approached Karan Malhotra, his associate director on My Name is Khan (2010), to helm the project. He considered the film to be a tribute to his father. Principal photography of Agneepath took place in Diu and Mumbai, with several accidents taking place on the sets. The music and background score was composed by Ajay–Atul, with lyrics written by Amitabh Bhattacharya. As with the original, the title is taken from a poem of the same name by Harivansh Rai Bachchan.

Agneepath was theatrically released in India on 26 January 2012, coinciding with the Republic Day celebrations, and in 2650 screens worldwide. Produced on a budget of ₹58 crore (US$10.85 million), the film broke the record for the highest-opening day for a film in India and became a commercial success with a worldwide gross of over ₹193 crore (US$36.12 million), emerging as the fifth highest-grossing Hindi film of 2012. The film received positive reviews from film critics in India with praise directed towards its direction, screenplay, music, cinematography and performances (particularly those of Roshan, Dutt and Kapoor). At the 58th Filmfare Awards, Agneepath received 5 nominations, including Best Actor Hrithik Roshan's single performances and single role and single fictional character and single costume and (Hrithik Roshan) and Best Supporting Actor (Rishi Kapoor). Additionally, it won 5 IIFA Awards and 4 Zee Cine Awards.

== Plot ==
Deep within the secluded island village of Mandwa, the village chief aspires to set up a drug empire by borrowing land from villagers (after lying to them that it will be used to expand the local salt industry). The villagers are warned of the chief's motives by revered school teacher, Deenanath Chauhan, who advises against surrendering their lands. The chief's son, Kancha, plots to have Deenanath out of the way. He frames him for the murder and rape of a young girl in the village. Deenanath is lynched by an angry mob, who feel betrayed by the school teacher's sudden evil turn.

Deenanath's son, Vijay, and pregnant wife, Suhasini, are forced to flee the village. They find refuge in a chawl in Dongri, Mumbai, but Vijay is unable to erase the memory of his father's murder from his head. He is fueled by an unrelenting desire for vengeance against Kancha. Suhasini gives birth to a daughter, Shiksha, while becoming estranged with Vijay, who has joined the gang of Rauf Lala in a bid to gain power. Vijay forms a bond with Kaali, after saving her from her abusive father, who he shoots dead in a heated moment.

Over in 1992, Vijay has risen through the ranks to become Lala's trusted lieutenant, while being quietly supported by Commissioner Gaitonde, who sees him taking on the underworld. Kancha, seeking to extend his drug empire into the city, dispatches his emissary Shantaram to bribe influential officials, including the Home Secretary of Maharashtra, Borkar. However, Vijay outmaneuvers Borkar and secures a monopoly for Lala's syndicate; in response, Lala rewards Vijay with control over Dongri.

Vijay conspires with Shantaram to kill Lala's son, Mazhar. With Mazhar's death, a shocked Lala hospitalised, and Lala's younger son, Azhar, unfit to rule, Vijay seizes control of Lala's empire. He immediately sets about dismantling Lala's criminal operations involving the trafficking of teenage girls. This draws the attention of Kancha, who invites Vijay to Mandwa to propose an alliance. Vijay offers Kancha control of Mumbai in exchange for Mandwa. Kancha retaliates by demanding the assassination of Gaitonde. Meanwhile, a recovering Lala discovers Vijay's betrayal and abducts Shiksha, intending to sell her off. Vijay kills Lala and reunites with Shiksha, but Suhasini still does not accept him.

As Ganesh Chaturthi celebrations unfold, Kancha's lieutenant, Surya, attempts a hit on Gaitonde, but Vijay intercepts and kills him. Suhasini's attempts to locate Vijay inadvertently lead to Gaitonde's corrupt subordinate Bakshi, who works for Kancha, informing him that Vijay is Deenanath's son, causing Kancha to plan an ambush. Kaali and Vijay get married, but Kaali dies when Kancha's hitmen open fire on the wedding party. Vowing final vengeance, Vijay makes a suicidal journey to Mandwa. He disables Kancha's gang by setting off several bombs. He and Kancha face off, but Kancha overpowers him. He then realizes Kancha has also abducted Suhasini and Shiksha, and intends to kill Vijay in front of them at the same location where Deenanath was lynched. The villagers, having realized over time that Deenanath was innocent, cry out in anguish as Kancha drags Vijay to the same fate. Seeing the tree where his father was hanged, Vijay gains new strength and fights back. He injures Kancha and ties him up, proceeding to hang him from the same tree itself. Having avenged his father's death, Vijay sees a vision of his father calling to join him in the afterlife. He succumbs to his injuries in Suhasini's arms as a devastated Shiksha watches on.

== Cast ==
- Hrithik Roshan as Vijay Deenanath Chauhan
  - Arish Bhiwandiwala as young Vijay Deenanath Chauhan
- Sanjay Dutt as Kancha Cheena
- Rishi Kapoor as Rauf Lala
- Priyanka Chopra as Kaali Gawde
- Om Puri as Commissioner Gaitonde
- Zarina Wahab as Suhasini Deenanath Chauhan, Vijay's mother
- Kanika Tiwari as Shiksha Deenanath Chauhan, Vijay's sister
- Chetan Pandit as Master Deenanath Chauhan, Vijay's father
- Sachin Khedekar as Home Minister Borkar
- Pankaj Tripathi as Surya
- Deven Bhojani as Azhar Lala
- Rajesh Tandon as Mazhar Lala
- Rajesh Vivek as Inspector Bakshi, Kancha's associate
- Brijendra Kala as Muneem, Kancha's aid
- Banwarilal Taneja as Kancha's father, the village chief
- Ravi Jhankal as Shantaram, Kancha's aid
- Madhurjeet Sarghi as Lachhi Gawde, Kaali's mother
- Vraddhi Sharma as Journalist
- Ali Asgar as Qawwali singer in the song "Shah Ka Rutba" (special appearance)
- Rajendra Chawla as Qawwali singer in the song "Shah Ka Rutba" (special appearance)
- Katrina Kaif as dancer in the song ''Chikni Chameli'' (special appearance)

== Production ==
=== Development ===
Karan Johar explained in an interview with The Times of India that he harboured intentions of remaking the original Agneepath ever since its release in 1990. Although the film had received critical acclaim over the years, its commercial failure at the time of release had devastated his father, producer Yash Johar. Eventually, the idea of a possible remake materialised on the sets of Karan Johar's fourth directorial venture My Name Is Khan, in which Karan Malhotra was his associate director. Johar told Malhotra of his desire to remake the original film and asked him to revisit it again. On not directing the film himself, Johar commented, "I am happy directing films on love, romance, and drama. That's what I do best. I don't think I will be good at an action film. So I am not taking the reins of the film in my hand". However, Johar maintained that the new film would belong to a different milieu as compared to the original. He stated, "We are adapting the film from the original but ours would be a new age version that would fit in well with today's time. We really hope that we are able to do justice to the original and make the remake exciting for today's generation." Karan dedicated the film to Yash Johar as a tribute. In an interview with Filmfare, he added that the protagonist of the film would be "more of an underdog", while the antagonist would be "more flamboyant and menacing" than the original.

Several changes were made to the storyline of the original film, including the omission of certain characters and the addition of new ones. The characters of Krishnan Iyer M.A., played by Mithun Chakraborty and Nurse Mary Matthew, played by Madhavi were done away with and new characters such as Rauf Lala and Kaali Gawde were introduced in the script. Moreover, the characterisation of Vijay Deenanath Chauhan was changed, unlike the original which was inspired by Al Pacino's role in Scarface (1983). During an interview with The Calcutta Telegraph, Malhotra explained the adaptation by saying, "The similarity (between the original and this film) lies only in the fact that it is a revenge film; a son seeking revenge for his father's death. Unlike Mr. (Amitabh) Bachchan's film, my film starts and ends in Mandwa and is primarily about the conflict between the mother and the son. It's a completely new film with a lot of new characters." He additionally termed Agneepath to be a "crazily dramatic masala Bollywood film".

=== Casting ===
While media reports initially suggested that Abhishek Bachchan was being considered to portray the role of Vijay, Malhotra approached Roshan for the role. Roshan, however, was sceptical on taking up a role earlier played by Amitabh Bachchan and agreed to star in the film only after months of deliberation. He said, "The script had so much passion that I felt very emotional and I made up my mind to do it". On casting Roshan, Malhotra explained, "Hrithik has the charm of a boy and the attitude of a man. Also, he has a certain vulnerability, which I was looking in my characterisation of Vijay Deenanath Chauhan." While explaining the character of Vijay, Malhotra added, "Nobody can play Vijay the way Amitabh Bachchan did, and I would have wanted my Vijay to be subtle even if it wasn't Hrithik. I wanted the negative characters in my film to be bigger. This made Hrithik's victory seem bigger." Roshan did not look up Bachchan's performance in the original for inspiration, as he considered his role to be completely different in Malhotra's vision. However, he faced several difficulties while filming, having suffered from a severe back injury, which caused him considerable pain, throughout the shooting schedule. During an interview with Filmfare he quoted, "Agneepath is the hardest I've ever worked in my life. I didn't know what the film had in store for me. I've never been so tired in my life. I have exhausted my body completely."

Kapoor was subsequently cast as Rauf Lala, an underworld don; alien to the opportunity of playing a completely negative character in his entire career, he was initially hesitant to sign the film. Later, in an interview with Daily News and Analysis he stated that when Malhotra had offered him the role, he considered it to be a joke and thought that he would be the reason for the film's failure. Kapoor subsequently insisted on a test look before principal photography could begin, so that he could comfortably fit into the Muslim character of Lala, who wears kohl in his eyes, a karakul cap and is dressed in traditional kurta-pajamas. While shooting for the action sequences, Kapoor suffered several bad falls and bruises, but continued shooting and was thereby praised by Roshan for his professionalism.

For the role of Kancha, the antagonist, Dutt was cast. According to Malhotra, the script of Agneepath demanded that the villain be more powerful than the hero, and due to Dutt's bulky frame, he was considered perfect for the role. The character of Kancha demanded that Dutt go bald, but due to a prior commitment to the film Son of Sardar, which was being shot simultaneously, he could not do so for the sake of continuity. Therefore, Hollywood make up artist Robin Slater created a "bald" look for Dutt, with the use of prosthetics. However, due to the summer heat in Diu, the make-up would eventually drip down Dutt's face, which impelled him to finally shave his head. Malhotra admitted to being inspired by Marlon Brando's bald look in the film Apocalypse Now (1979) while designing Dutt's character. Dutt explained his look by saying, "Kancha is suffering from an ailment that leaves him hairless. I shaved my head for the role, not once but twice, and the eye-brows and eye-lashes have been digitally removed." Furthermore, Dutt worked out in the gym twice a day in order to bulk up for the role.

During pre-production, media reports suggested that several actresses including Genelia D'Souza, Chopra and Kareena Kapoor were being considered for the role of Kaali Gawde. However, Chopra was approached over the others, and she agreed to do the film instantly. While initial reports suggested that Chopra would be playing the role of a sex worker in the film, they were later denied as rumours; in an interview with Rediff.com, she clarified that she was playing a prostitute's daughter. On Chopra's character, Malhotra commented, "Despite being a male dominated film, the part played by Priyanka Chopra is very prominent. It isn't that of a simple or ordinary lover. She is there for Vijay unconditionally and without any expectations. With all the dangerous people around her, she is like this pretty flower standing there with a smile on her face." Chopra wanted to visit a brothel to prepare for her role, but Malhotra insisted that she don't for safety reasons.

Among the supporting roles, Zarina Wahab was cast as Suhasini Chauhan, Vijay's mother, a role originally played by Rohini Hattangadi. Wahab agreed to do the film due to her close association with producer Johar, who had earlier directed her in a brief role in My Name Is Khan. For the role of Shiksha Chauhan, newcomer Kanika Tiwari from Bhopal was auditioned and cast among 6500 girls. Filming for the song "Chikni Chameli" was demanding on Katrina Kaif, as she ended up with cuts and blisters on her feet, due to the long, stretched-out schedules.

=== Filming ===
Principal photography of Agneepath took place in the union territory of Diu, which was used to double as the village of Mandwa. Johar had to complete several formalities before shooting could begin, due to the sensitive nature of the territory. Malhotra, however did not shoot in the port of Mandwa itself, as it was "too congested". While shooting for the film in Mumbai, a picture of Roshan, filming a dahi handi sequence was leaked to the media. Worried over this, Johar increased the security on the sets and banned the use of cell phones. Additionally, Chopra faced difficulties in allocating dates to shoot for the film, as she was simultaneously shooting for Anurag Basu's Barfi!.

According to Malhotra, most of the action stunts in the film were shot by Roshan and Dutt themselves, while body doubles were used to film a few scenes. Several accidents took place during the filming of Agneepath. Chopra's lehenga caught fire, while shooting for an elaborate Ganpati festival song. Roshan too scalded his hands while shooting for the same scene. Roshan also suffered from an eye injury during the shoot of a song, when holi colours were flung into his eyes by some junior artists. During a schedule in October, Roshan suffered from a major back injury while lifting a man weighing 110 kilograms, which was a part of an elaborate action sequence. Shooting was stalled for some time following the incident, while Roshan recuperated in a hospital.

While Ravi K. Chandran was assigned as the cinematographer of Agneepath, he opted out of the film after filming certain portions for unknown reasons. Kiran Deohans was later contracted to replace him. Sabu Cyril was contracted as the production designer for the film, along with a team of 200 people. He explained the creation of Kancha's den by saying that he built a haveli-like structure with tantric paintings on the walls, resembling an old fort built by the Portuguese (who had historically occupied Diu). Vijay's home, on the other hand, was a "small sack-like thing" on the terrace of a chawl, which was built on open ground with a hundred houses. Cyril added, "We wanted a tree to be at the edge of a hillside, protruding out due to erosion, with not enough soil. We made this banyan tree with fibre as we wanted it to have a particular look." This tree forms a visual thread to represent Kancha's atrocities in the film. The song "Chikni Chameli" featuring Kaif was shot in Film City, Mumbai, where the entire set of Dutt's villa was recreated.

== Soundtrack ==
The music of Agneepath was composed by Ajay–Atul, with lyrics written by Amitabh Bhattacharya. The songs were composed with the help of live instrumentation being extensively used. While explaining the process involved in composing the soundtrack, Ajay said that Malhotra narrated the story to them for over four hours, whilst humming the background score that he wanted. This was followed by innumerable discussions which made them "understand each other well". He also mentioned that the song "Chikni Chameli" was a remake of their own Marathi song "Kombadi Palali" from the film Jatra (2006). The song "Deva Shree Ganesha" became a cult devotional hit, owing to its tremendous use of Marathi folk beats. Sony Music acquired the rights to the album for ₹90 million (US$960,000).

== Themes and analysis ==
Agneepath derives its name from a poem of the same name written by Harivansh Rai Bachchan. The poem, which is recited through the film provides a metaphorical link to represent Vijay's quest for vengeance. Several critics consider Agneepath to be a homage to the era of the melodramatic, over-the-top action films of the 1980s and 90s. Critic Rajeev Masand analysed, "Agneepath is a throwback to those heightened action dramas of the 90s, so every dialogue is delivered as a punch-line; our hero may be battered and stabbed, yet he'll rise like the Phoenix, and the women are flung around to be raped or sold as sex slaves." He added, "The film is enhanced by uncompromising, brutal action, and by its striking camerawork, especially those scenes framed against a monsoon sky, heavy with dark clouds." Writing for Hindustan Times, Mayank Shekhar explained that the film, like several other Bollywood films, was inspired by the Indian epic tale of the Ramayana. He also added that "the external logic of a star-driven, fantasy fed film" would "not be easy to gulp for many." While writing a critique for Deccan Chronicle, Suparna Sharma quoted, "Agneepath is more than a remake or a homage to the original. It's about a son righting a wrong and this emotion makes us connect with the film immediately."

== Marketing ==
The first official trailer of Agneepath was launched at a press conference in Mumbai on 29 August 2011. Dharma Productions streamed the event live on the production house's YouTube channel. The event was attended by the entire cast: Roshan, Kapoor, Dutt and Chopra. The trailer of the film was the third most watched trailer in India, behind the films, Don 2 and Ra.One.

The film associated itself with McDonald's to provide a discount of ₹50 (53¢ US) to customers buying a meal at the joint. Additionally, few winners were offered a chance to win a lunch date with Roshan. As part of the promotional campaign, Roshan, Dutt and Chopra visited Dubai on 19 January 2012, to interact with fans at a shopping mall, followed by an invitational high tea party. The actors travelled to several places in India including New Delhi, Nagpur and other cities to promote the film.

Indiagames also released an adventure mobile video game based on the film.

== Release ==
Prior to its theatrical release, the Central Board of Film Certification (CBFC) certified the film with a UA certificate after demanding a few cuts, due to a high proportion of violence present in the film. Explaining the certificate, Pankaja Thakur, CEO of CBFC stated, "Agneepath has a lot of bloodsheds but none of us felt disturbed by it. The violence is not the type that can psychologically damage a child and the softer scenes of the film managed to offset the darker part of it". The film's posters subsequently featured disclaimers reading, "This film is certified U/A. We advise parental guidance due to violence in the film." The board consequently praised Johar for the step.

Initially scheduled to release on 28 December 2011, Agneepath was postponed by a week to 26 January to coincide with the Republic Day celebrations. The film eventually released at around 2650 screens worldwide. The satellite rights of the film were originally sold to Zee Network for a sum of ₹410 million (US$4.4 million), a month before the theatrical release, which marked a distant first for the studio, whose earlier rights were often sold either to Star India or Sony Pictures Networks. Somehow, this meant that the deal would appear in later stages, and after Baar Baar Dekho being one of the films, several films produced by the studio in 2017, 2018 and 2019 would be sold to Zee TV. Dharma Productions released the DVD of Agneepath on 13 March 2012 across all regions in the NTSC format, with a censor rating of PG-13. The DVD includes special features such as the "making of the film" and "deleted scenes and songs". It is available in Dolby Digital 5.1 and Stereo format with English and Arabic subtitles presented in 16:9 anamorphic widescreen. The film is now available on Netflix and Amazon Prime Video, with its renewed satellite rights now owned by Viacom 18.

== Reception ==
=== Critical reception ===
==== India ====
Upon release, Agneepath received positive reviews from film critics in India with praise directed towards its direction, screenplay, music, cinematography and performances (particularly those of Roshan, Dutt and Kapoor). Taran Adarsh of Bollywood Hungama gave the film a score of 4.5 out of 5, and said, "Agneepath is an uncomplicated story of revenge, is hard-hitting yet entertaining, dwells on strong emotions and aggressive and forceful action, yet is dissimilar from the original. It is a fitting tribute to the masterwork." Subhash K. Jha of IANS gave it 4 out of 5 stars, while commenting, "Every component of the film falls into place, with a resounding thump. Agneepath is brilliant in its brutality. It's a riveting and hectic homage to the spirit of the cinema when revenge reigned supreme. And content was king. This new Agneepath takes us back to the era when there was no computer or cellphones. And communication with the audience was immediate and electrifying." Kaveree Bamzai of India Today rated the film 4 out of 5, noting, "Melodramatic, choir-inducing sentiment, ecstatic. Agneepath is that rare mainstream movie written well."

Aniruddha Guha of Daily News and Analysis gave the film 3.5 out of 5, reviewing, "An adaptation rather than a remake, the film assumes a life of its own once the central plot has been established. The film then charts a journey of his own." Piyali Dasgupta of NDTV gave it 3.5 out of 5, stating "Watch this film because this one is unadulterated Bollywood entertainment." Daily Bhaskar gave the film 3.5 out of 5 stars, while adding, "On the whole, Agneepath totally rests on star power which will lure the cine-goers to halls but how far will it impress them remains to be seen."

Avijit Ghosh of The Times of India gave the film 3 stars out of 5, and said, "Try to wipe out the movie's earlier version from your mind. You might find it more enjoyable." Sukanya Verma of Rediff gave it 3 out of 5, while commenting, "Agneepath, less of a remake, more of a tribute. The makers of Agneepath should have just called it Dharmapath." Kunal Guha of Yahoo.com gave the film 3 out of 5 stars, saying that, "The biggest dilemma of remaking a movie is how much to retain and what to retain. If the new story takes violent shifts, you lose the audience who came to revisit the original. If you photocopy scene-by-scene, you risk failing to connect with the audience who is accustomed to present sensibilities. The only safe bet: a 'khichdi' of the past and the present, like this one." Mayank Shekhar of Hindustan Times gave the film 3 out of 5 stars while remarking, "This is the kind of genuine theatre experience, now getting rare, which remains most precious in the life of a film-goer. Reason can take over later. I had a ball!" Sonia Chopra of Sify gave it 3 out of 5, and mentioned, "Debut director Karan Malhotra shows great promise in making the film visually arresting and maintaining the consistency of performances. But remaking a cult film means you have big shoes to fill. If you're a loyalist of the late Mukul Anand's Agneepath, you're likely to have reservations with this one. But if you leave the comparisons aside and are willing to forgive the faults, Agneepath is worth a watch essentially to savor Hrithik's performance." Rajeev Masand of CNN-IBN gave Agneepath 3 out of 5 and said, "It is in the end, an old-fashioned revenge drama treated in that melodramatic, over-the-top style. You're not likely to be bored by the intense action and the solid performances, but prepare to be exhausted by just how long this film plays on."

==== Overseas ====
Overseas, the film received positive reviews. Russel Edwards of Variety reviewed, "Debuting helmer Karan Malhotra stokes up a fiery revenge tale in Agneepath, an expensively pumped-up, relentlessly energetic retelling of the 1990 Amitabh Bachchan cult favorite of the same name. Toplining Bollywood hunk Hrithik Roshan and veteran actor Sanjay Dutt donning the hat as the antagonist, this dynamic Hindi action extravaganza boosts its potent story with an aggressive style that will ensure audiences feel every blow." Farah Andrews of Gulf News praised the film while saying, "Fans of the 1990 original starring Amitabh Bachchan and Danny Denzongpa as Vijay and Kancha may be wary about the remake, but take it from us, the revamped flick is well worth a watch." Rabina A. Khan of The First Post wrote, "Director Karan Malhotra has made an impressive film under the able guidance of his mentor, Karan Johar. It scores on all directorial aspects – design, sound, edit, costumes, camera, a phenomenal cast, dialogues, and a very gripping screenplay."

=== Box office ===
Agneepath broke the record of the highest opening day collections, with a nett of ₹217.6 million (US$2.3 million) on its opening day, surpassing the previous record held by Bodyguard. Subsequently, the film netted ₹621.1 million (US$6.6 million) over its extended four-day weekend. The film's collections sustained well on its first Monday and it netted around ₹75 million (US$800,000), taking its five-day total to ₹695 million (US$7.4 million) nett. It netted ₹65 million (US$690,000) on Tuesday and another ₹50 million (US$530,000) nett on Wednesday. The movie brought its first-week total to ₹858.8 million (US$9.2 million) nett, thereby emerging as a major commercial success.

The film collected ₹231.2 million (US$2.5 million) in its second week, thus taking its two-week total to ₹1.09 billion (US$12 million) nett. The film collected ₹75.9 million (US$810,000) nett in its third week, taking its three-week nett collections to ₹1.17 billion (US$12 million). It collected ₹26.1 million (US$280,000) in its fourth week, taking its four-week nett collections to ₹1.19 billion (US$13 million). Agneepath was thus declared a "superhit". Agneepath has collected ₹1.20 billion (US$13 million) in its lifetime run in India. Its final distributor share was ₹655 million (US$7.0 million).

After a successful opening in the domestic market, Agneepath made ₹165 million (US$1.8 million) in its four-day weekend, overseas. At the time of release, the film holds the record for the twelfth largest opening ever internationally. The film has grossed around $6 million in overseas markets.

== Awards and nominations ==
Award	Date	Category	Recipient(s)	Result
Filmfare Awards	13 January 2013	Best Actor	Hrithik Roshan	Nominated
Filmfare Awards	13 January 2013	Best Supporting Actor	Rishi Kapoor	Nominated
Filmfare Awards	13 January 2013	Best Lyricist	Amitabh Bhattacharya ("Abhi Mujh Main Kahin")	Nominated
Filmfare Awards	13 January 2013	Best Male Playback Singer	Sonu Nigam ("Abhi Mujh Main Kahin")	Nominated
Filmfare Awards	13 January 2013	Best Female Playback Singer	Shreya Ghoshal ("Chikni Chameli")	Nominated
Screen Awards	2 January 2013	Best Actor	Hrithik Roshan	Nominated
Screen Awards	2 January 2013	Best Villain	Rishi Kapoor	Nominated
Screen Awards	2 January 2013	Best Villain	Sanjay Dutt	Nominated
Screen Awards	2 January 2013	Best Debut Director	Karan Malhotra	Nominated
Screen Awards	2 January 2013	Best Production Design	Sabu Cyril	Nominated
Screen Awards	2 January 2013	Best Choreography	Ganesh Acharya ("Chikni Chameli")	Nominated
Screen Awards	2 January 2013	Best Action Director	Abbas Ali Moghul	Nominated
Zee Cine Awards	20 January 2013	Best Actor in a Negative Role	Rishi Kapoor	Won
Zee Cine Awards	20 January 2013	Best Playback Singer – Male	Sonu Nigam ("Abhi Mujh Main Kahin")	Won
Zee Cine Awards	20 January 2013	Best Choreography	Ganesh Acharya ("Chikni Chameli")	Won
Zee Cine Awards	20 January 2013	Best Background Score	Ajay–Atul	Won
Zee Cine Awards	20 January 2013	Best Film	Karan Malhotra	Nominated
Zee Cine Awards	20 January 2013	Best Actor – Male	Hrithik Roshan	Nominated
Zee Cine Awards	20 January 2013	Song of the Year	"Chikni Chameli"	Nominated
IIFA Awards	6 July 2013	Best Actor in a Negative Role	Rishi Kapoor	Won
IIFA Awards	6 July 2013	Best Lyricist	Amitabh Bhattacharya ("Abhi Mujh Main Kahin")	Won
IIFA Awards	6 July 2013	Best Playback Singer - Male	Sonu Nigam ("Abhi Mujh Main Kahin")	Won
IIFA Awards	6 July 2013	Best Playback Singer - Female	Shreya Ghoshal ("Chikni Chameli")	Won
IIFA Awards	6 July 2013	Best Choreography	Ganesh Acharya ("Chikni Chameli")	Won
IIFA Awards	6 July 2013	Best Actor	Hrithik Roshan	Nominated
IIFA Awards	6 July 2013	Best Actor in a Negative Role	Sanjay Dutt	Nominated
IIFA Awards	6 July 2013	Best Music Director	Ajay–Atul	Nominated
IIFA Awards	6 July 2013	Best Playback Singer - Male	Ajay Gogavale ("Deva Shree Ganesha")	Nominated
Stardust Awards	26 January 2013	Best Actor (Drama)	Hrithik Roshan	Won
Stardust Awards	26 January 2013	Best Actor in Negative Role	Sanjay Dutt	Won
Stardust Awards	26 January 2013	Best Debut Music Director	Ajay–Atul	Won
Mirchi Music Awards	7 February 2013	Song of The Year	"Abhi Mujh Mein Kahin"	Won
Mirchi Music Awards	7 February 2013	Album of The Year	Ajay–Atul, Amitabh Bhattacharya	Won
Mirchi Music Awards	7 February 2013	Male Vocalist of The Year	Sonu Nigam ("Abhi Mujh Main Kahin")	Won
Mirchi Music Awards	7 February 2013	Female Vocalist of The Year	Shreya Ghoshal ("Chikni Chameli")	Won
Mirchi Music Awards	7 February 2013	Music Composer of The Year	Ajay–Atul ("Abhi Mujh Main Kahin")	Won
Mirchi Music Awards	7 February 2013	Song representing Sufi tradition	"O Saiyyan"	Won
Mirchi Music Awards	7 February 2013	Song Recording/Sound Engineering of the Year	Vijay Dayal ("Deva Shree Ganesha")	Won
Mirchi Music Awards	7 February 2013	Male Vocalist of The Year	Roop Kumar Rathod ("O Saiyyan")	Nominated
Mirchi Music Awards	7 February 2013	Female Vocalist of The Year	Sunidhi Chauhan ("Gun Gun Guna")	Nominated
Mirchi Music Awards	7 February 2013	Music Composer of The Year	Ajay–Atul ("Chikni Chameli")	Nominated
Mirchi Music Awards	7 February 2013	Lyricist of The Year	Amitabh Bhattacharya ("Abhi Mujh Main Kahin")	Nominated
Mirchi Music Awards	7 February 2013	Song representing Sufi tradition	"Shah Ka Rutba"	Nominated
Mirchi Music Awards	7 February 2013	Programmer & Arranger of the Year	Ajay–Atul ("O Saiyyan")	Nominated
Mirchi Music Awards	7 February 2013	Song Recording/Sound Engineering of the Year	Vijay Dayal ("Abhi Mujh Main Kahin")	Nominated
Mirchi Music Awards	7 February 2013	Background Score of the Year	Ajay–Atul	Nominated
