= Chikni Chameli =

Song by Shreya Ghoshal

from the album Agneepath
- Language: Hindi
- Released: 16 December 2011
- Recorded: 2011
- Genre: Filmi, pop-folk
- Length: 5:03
- Label: Sony Music
- Composer: Ajay–Atul
- Lyricist: Amitabh Bhattacharya
- Producer: Ajay–Atul

Audio sample
- file; help

Music video
- Chikni Chameli – The Official Song – Agneepath – Katrina Kaif on YouTube

"Chikni Chameli" is a song from the 2012 Indian Hindi action drama film Agneepath, directed by Karan Malhotra and produced by Karan Johar. A remake of Marathi song "Kombadi Palali" from the 2006 film Jatra: Hyalagaad Re Tyalagaad, the song was first revealed on 16 December 2011 and features Katrina Kaif as the lead, along with Hrithik Roshan and Sanjay Dutt. The song was sung by Shreya Ghoshal and the dance choreographed by Ganesh Acharya.

== Background ==
It is a remake of the Marathi song "Kombadi Palali" from the film Jatra (2006), which was acted by Bharat Jadhav & Kranti Redkar and sung by Anand Shinde & Vaishali Samant.

The music is composed by the National award-winning Marathi composer duo Ajay and Atul Gogavale, known as Ajay–Atul, who had earlier worked on Natrang, Viruddh, Singham and My Friend Pinto.

== Music video ==
Chikni Chameli is an item song, although the video is provocative, it also boost the plot forward as it shows the communication between the hero and villain. It consists of Katrina Kaif, a prostitute hired by Sanjay Dutt's character, Kanchana to welcome Hrithik Roshan's character, Vijay. The official music video has over 478 million views as of March 2025 on the video sharing application YouTube.

=== Filming ===
The choreographer for the song's music video was Ganesh Acharya and Amitabh Battacharya was the lyricist.

Karan Malhotra, in an interview revealed how he got the inspiration for the song after an assistant sound designer, Lochan Kanvinde, recommended the original song, "Kombadi Palali". The choreography was not easy for Katrina Kaif, she expressed the difficulty in an interview by saying "The response to Chikni Chameli has been fun so far. It was hard work. It was very fast and it was not a style I was used to, but I took it as a challenge. I think we all went for it as a team and did the best we could. I am happy people are liking it".

During the song, most of the dancing done was on barefoot, which took place on cement. This injured the soles of Katrina Kaif, as revealed by Ganesh Acharya in an interview, “The song is a rustic number, so she had to dance bare-feet on the uneven ground. Halfway through the number, she injured the soles of her feet as the continuous pressure peeled off her skin. Despite everyone telling her to attend to her injuries, she continued with the dance without a whimper”.

== Reception ==
The song was well received by critics and audiences alike.

== Awards and nominations ==
Year	Award Ceremony	Category	Recipient	Result	Reference(s)
2012	Mirchi Music Awards	Female Vocalist of The Year	Shreya Ghoshal	Won	
2012	Mirchi Music Awards	Music Composer of the Year	Ajay–Atul	Nominated	
2012	People's Choice Awards	Female Vocalist of The Year	Shreya Ghoshal	Won	
