= Kombadi Palali =

Marathi-language film song

- Official song cover, featuring Kranti Redkar and Bharat Jadhav

Single by Anand Shinde, Vaishali Samant

from the album Jatra: Hyalagaad Re Tyalagaad
- Language: Marathi
- Genre: Filmi; folk; dance
- Length: 4:49
- Label: Video Palace
- Songwriter: Jitendra Joshi
- Composer: Ajay-Atul
- Producer: Bela Shinde

Jatra: Hyalagaad Re Tyalagaad track listing
- 1. "Kombadi Palali"; 2. "Ye Go Ye Ye Maina"

Music video
- Kombadi Palali – The Official Song – Jatra: Hyalagaad Re Tyalagaad on YouTube

"Kombadi Palali" (Note: lit. 'The Hen Ran Away') is a Marathi-language song from the soundtrack album of the 2005 comedy film Jatra: Hyalagaad Re Tyalagaad, directed by Kedar Shinde, it was picturised on Bharat Jadhav and Kranti Redkar. The song was composed by Ajay-Atul, voiced by Anand Shinde, Vaishali Samant, with lyrics penned by Jitendra Joshi. It was adapted into Hindi as "Chikni Chameli" for the 2012 action drama Agneepath, featuring Hrithik Roshan, Sanjay Dutt, and Katrina Kaif in the song. Kranti Redkar gained acclaim for her dancing prowess in the song.

== Development and picturisation ==
"The song demanded a touch of South Indian dance style, and I felt my style was a bit Rowdy. When I first listened to the song, I was clueless. At the audition, they unexpectedly asked me to sing, and it was pulsating. I remember thinking, "Wow, this song is really fast." After that, we had rehearsals for the dance routine."

— Kranti Redkar, told at the Kanchan Adhikari's YouTube show Baton Baton Mein.

Jadhav initially selected actress Aditi Sarangdhar for the role before Kranti Redkar took over. At the time, Sarangdhar was busy with the lead role in the serial Vadalvaat and had to decline the film due to scheduling conflicts. She also turned down the role of Bakulabai, which was later played by Priya Berde, citing similar time constraints. Meanwhile, Bharti Achrekar and Kranti Redkar were involved in a play together. Achrekar recommended Redkar to Jadhav, who promptly contacted Redkar and convinced her to join the film, even before she knew the storyline, as she headed to Satara for filming.

Choreographer Umesh Jadhav spent two days to rehearsing for the song. Ankush Chaudhari, who served as an assistant director and also designed Redkar's costume for the song, faced a setback when Redkar's costume failed to arrive on time for the shoot, which had already commenced. Reflecting on the situation, Redkar lamented, "My costume didn't arrive until 2 o'clock. I was in tears in the make-up room. I ended up missing half of the song due to the delay. Thankfully, it finally arrived at 2 o'clock."

== Credits ==
- Song – "Kombadi Palali"
- Film – Jatra: Hyalagaad Re Tyalagaad
- Director – Kedar Shinde
- Producer – Bela Shinde
- Starring – Bharat Jadhav, Kranti Redkar
- Singers – Anand Shinde, Vaishali Samant
- Choreographer – Umesh Jadhav
- Lyricist – Jitendra Joshi
- Music director – Ajay-Atul
- Music label – Video Palace

== Reception ==
Due to its infectious beats and Redkar's well-known dance moves, the song has become a perennial favourite at many cultural festivals in Maharashtra.

In 2017, the song was ranked first in Billboard's list of the top 10 best Marathi songs of all time.

== Adaptations ==
=== Hindi (Agneepath, 2012) ===
The song was remade in Bollywood film Agneepath as "Chikni Chameli" was released in December 2011. Filmed on Katrina Kaif, Hrithik Roshan and Sanjay Dutt. It was sung by Shreya Ghoshal and choreographed by Ganesh Acharya, while the original song is choreographed by Umesh Jadhav.
