= Karan Malhotra =

India film director

- Born: Karan Ravi Malhotra; Mumbai, Maharashtra, India
- Occupations: Film director; screenwriter; lyricist
- Years active: 2000–present
- Spouse: Ekta Pathak
- Children: 1

Karan Ravi Malhotra is an Indian film director and screenwriter who works in Hindi films. He is best known for directing Agneepath (2012).

== Career ==
Karan Malhotra worked as an assistant director for films such as Main Hoon Na (2004), Lakshya (2004), Jodhaa Akbar (2008), and My Name Is Khan (2010). He made his directorial debut with Agneepath (2012), a remake of the 1990 film of the same name.

=== Unrealized projects ===
Malhotra and his wife Ekta Pathak Malhotra began working on the screenplay for Shuddhi, which was scheduled for a Diwali 2016 release and was produced by Dharma Productions. While working on the script, they both made several research-based trips to Hrishikesh, one of the planned shooting locations for the film. In March 2013, producer Karan Johar officially announced that Dharma Productions had begun pre-production on this new film venture.

Though initially rumored to be a film adaptation of Amish Tripathi's "The Immortals of Meluha", this was later proven false. In September 2013, Karan Johar announced that Malhotra would direct The Immortals of Meluha, but only after the theatrical release of Shuddhi. However, in May 2017, Amish Tripathi revealed that Dharma Productions had dropped the film rights to his books due to the contract expiring, with filmmaker Sanjay Leela Bhansali buying the rights. It was later bought by Shekhar Kapur and Roy Price who will adapt the book into a web series, marking the debut production venture for Roy Price's International Art Machine in India.

== Personal life ==
He is married to screenwriter Ekta Pathak, with whom he has a child with.

== Filmography ==
Year	Title	Director	Screenwriter	Notes
2012	Agneepath	Yes	Yes	
2015	Brothers	Yes	Yes	
2022	Shamshera	Yes	Yes	Also lyricist

=== Assistant director ===
- Pukar (2000)
- Lajja (2001)
- Tumko Na Bhool Paayenge (2002)
- Main Hoon Na (2004)
- Lakshya (2004)
- Jaan-E-Mann (2006)
- Jodhaa Akbar (2008)
- My Name Is Khan (2010)
