= Fergusson College =

College in Pune, India

Coordinates: 18.523969°N 73.839219°E

Fergusson College (Autonomous), Pune
- फर्ग्युसन महाविद्यालय (स्वायत्त), पुणे
- Shield of the Deccan Education Society
- Motto: Knowledge is Power
- Type: Public – Private
- Established: 1885; 141 years ago
- Affiliations: Savitribai Phule Pune University; UGC
- Principal: Dr. Shyam Mude
- Vice principals: P. M. Pawar; Dr. Radhika Jadhav
- Location: Fergusson College Road, Shivajinagar, Pune, Maharashtra, India
- Campus: Urban, 65 acres (260,000 m^{2})
- Website: www.fergusson.edu

Fergusson College is an autonomous public-private college offering various courses in the streams of arts and science in the city of Pune, India. It was founded in 1885 by Vaman Shriram Apte, Bal Gangadhar Tilak, Vishnushashtri Chiplunkar, Mahadeo Ballal Namjoshi and Gopal Ganesh Agarkar. Professor Vaman Shivram Apte was its first principal. Social reformer, journalist, thinker and educationist Gopal Ganesh Agarkar served as the second principal from August 1892, till his death in June 1895.

The college is named after Scottish-born Sir James Fergusson, the Governor of Bombay, the college has been under the jurisdiction of the University of Pune. In May 2018, Fergusson college was upgraded to a unitary university following an update from Ministry of HRD.

The college has two sections:

- The Junior Wing (junior college) is for students graduating from school. Courses are offered in Arts and Science streams, at the end of which students may appear for the Higher-Secondary State Certificate examination.
- The Senior Wing offers bachelor's degrees in 29 disciplines and master's degrees in 16 disciplines.

Fergusson College is known for its close association with Indian politics. Its founders were pioneers of the Indian National Congress, as well as, Indian Socialist Movement. The college has produced, several ministers and legislators, including two Indian Prime Ministers.

Fergusson was among the 19 colleges to get a heritage tag by the central government and UGC in 2015. So, the college receives financial help from UGC for the conservation of campus and buildings.

== History ==
=== Foundation ===
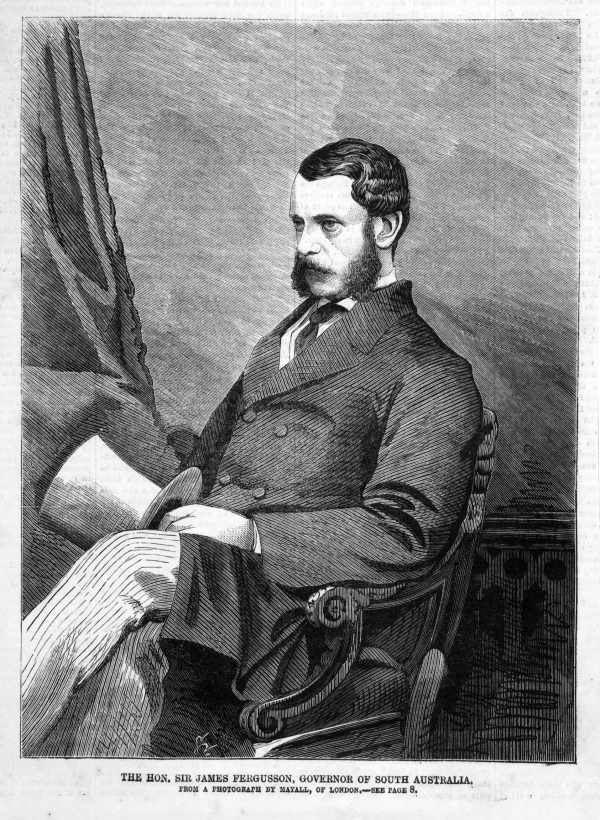
Sir James Fergusson, Governor of Bombay

After the suppression of the Indian Rebellion of 1857, reformers in India felt a pressing need to modernise the education system in order to advance the cause of reform. Prominent nationalists, such as Bal Gangadhar Tilak, Vishnushastri Krushnashastri Chiplunkar and Gopal Ganesh Agarkar led efforts to found a school designed for the general advancement of the Indian public; leading to the creation of the New English School. Inspired by the school's success, the Deccan Education Society was formed in 1884; a year later the Fergusson College was established. An area of 37 acres (150,000 m^{2}) of land was leased for 99-years by Shirole, the erstwhile Patil of the village of Bhamburde on the west bank of the Mutha River.

The college was inaugurated by William Wordsworth, a namesake grandson of William Wordsworth and principal of Elphinstone College in Mumbai. Other leaders such as R. G. Bhandarkar and Mahadev Govind Ranade played a part in its construction. The college was named after the then Governor of Bombay, Sir James Fergusson. The British colonial government in Bombay allowed the college to remain autonomous, giving it a free hand in education.

In 1935, during the celebrations marking 50 years of the college's founding, Sir C. V. Raman noted,

… Standing here today, I feel that history has been written in Poona- history of self-help, history of self-reliance, history of great and constructive national effort- that history has been written in Poona, has been written on this very spot …

Mahatma Gandhi, in a message to then Principal Dr. Mahajani wrote,

Who will fail to be enthused over the noble record of the service rendered by the D. E. Society and the Fergusson College to the cause of education?

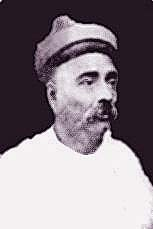
Bal Gangadhar Tilak was one of the founders of the college

=== Post-independence ===
Post-1947, Fergusson College has produced leaders in the fields of politics, academia, literature and art. Rajendra Prasad, India's first president, was the chief guest of the platinum jubilee function. He said on the occasion,

The Fergusson College was established at a time when the attitude of the Indian masses towards higher education of the western type was yet in a formative stage and when facilities for such education for the generality of Indian students were inadequate… It was an enterprise, which benefited the Nation without offending or alienating the then rulers of India. Fergusson College is the foremost fruit of that effort.

In 1985, the college completed its centenary. Rajiv Gandhi, the then prime minister was the president of the ceremony. P. V. Narasimha Rao, India's 12th prime minister and former student, said,

This college, born like a twin of the Indian National Congress, has always kept abreast of the country's history. It has produced political leaders of all hues of the political spectrum including ultras and infras, if I may say so, administrators, eminent scholars, researchers, writers, sportsmen and many other categories of celebrities, which any country can be proud of.

A two-part history of the college was written by Dr. VM Bachal, former principal. The book, Vatchal Sawashe Varshanchi (A Journey of 125 Years) was published in January 2010.

In 2018, Fergusson was given University status by the Ministry of Human resource development.

=== Association with Indian politics ===
Fergusson College has been given many epithets by political leaders, including 'cradle of Indian polity' and 'twin of the Congress'.

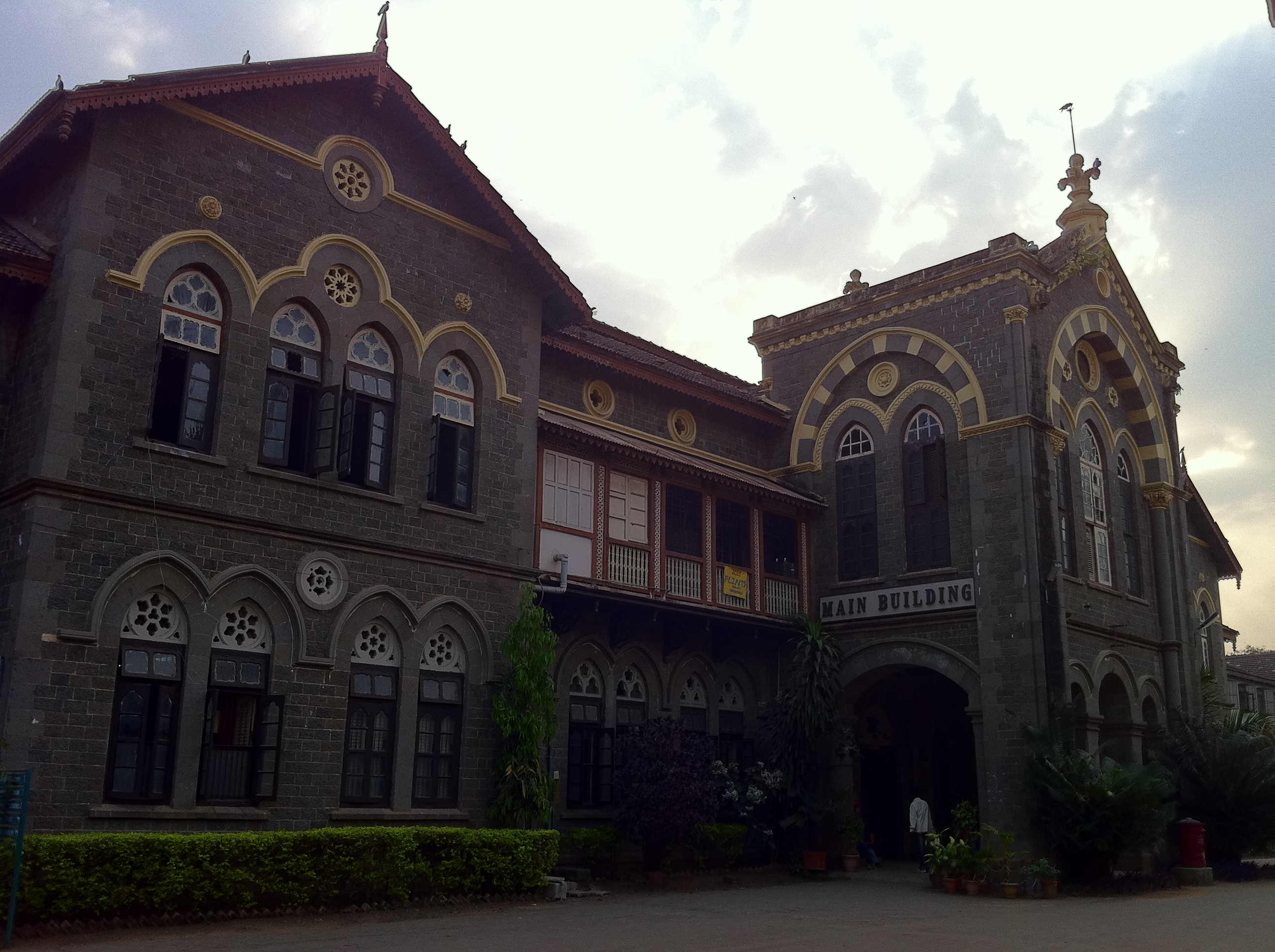
The Main Building

The founders of Fergusson College, most notably Tilak and Gokhale, were leaders of the Indian National Congress in its early stages from 1885 to 1920. In fact, most historians divide the history of the INC into two eras — the Tilak Era and the Gandhi era. The college has produced as alumni, notable Congress leaders including V. P. Singh and P. V. Narasimha Rao, J. B. Kripalani and Babubhai J. Patel. (See comprehensive list below.)

Among the founders, Gopal Ganesh Agarkar and Mahadev Ballal Namjoshi were early Socialists of Maharashtra. Alumni such as Vitthal Ramji Shinde, Shreedhar Mahadev Joshi, and Nanasaheb Gore were eminent socialists, inside and outside the Congress fold. The Samyukta Maharashtra Movement, founded to fight for Maharashtra's statehood, included several alumni such as Pralhad Keshav Atre, Shreedhar Mahadev Joshi and Gore. Vinayak Damodar Savarkar, in 1902, enrolled in Fergusson College. As a young man, he was inspired by the new generation of radical political leaders — Bal Gangadhar Tilak, Bipin Chandra Pal and Lala Lajpat Rai — along with the political struggle against the Partition of Bengal and the rising Swadeshi campaign. After completing his degree, nationalist activist Shyamji Krishna Varma helped Vinayak to go to England to study law, on a scholarship.

Fergusson is the only institution in India to have in its alumni two Indian Prime Minister of India.

== Campus ==
From the 37 acres (150,000 m^{2}) leased out by Shirole, the erstwhile Patil of Bhamburde in 1881, the college expanded to 65 acres (260,000 m^{2}) by the time of Independence. The campus extends until the slopes of a hillock, popularly called Fergusson Hill. Several educational institutions are around the hillock. The college is largely built in accordance with the Victorian school of architecture, although it has some Gothic and traditional Indian styles as well.

=== Buildings ===
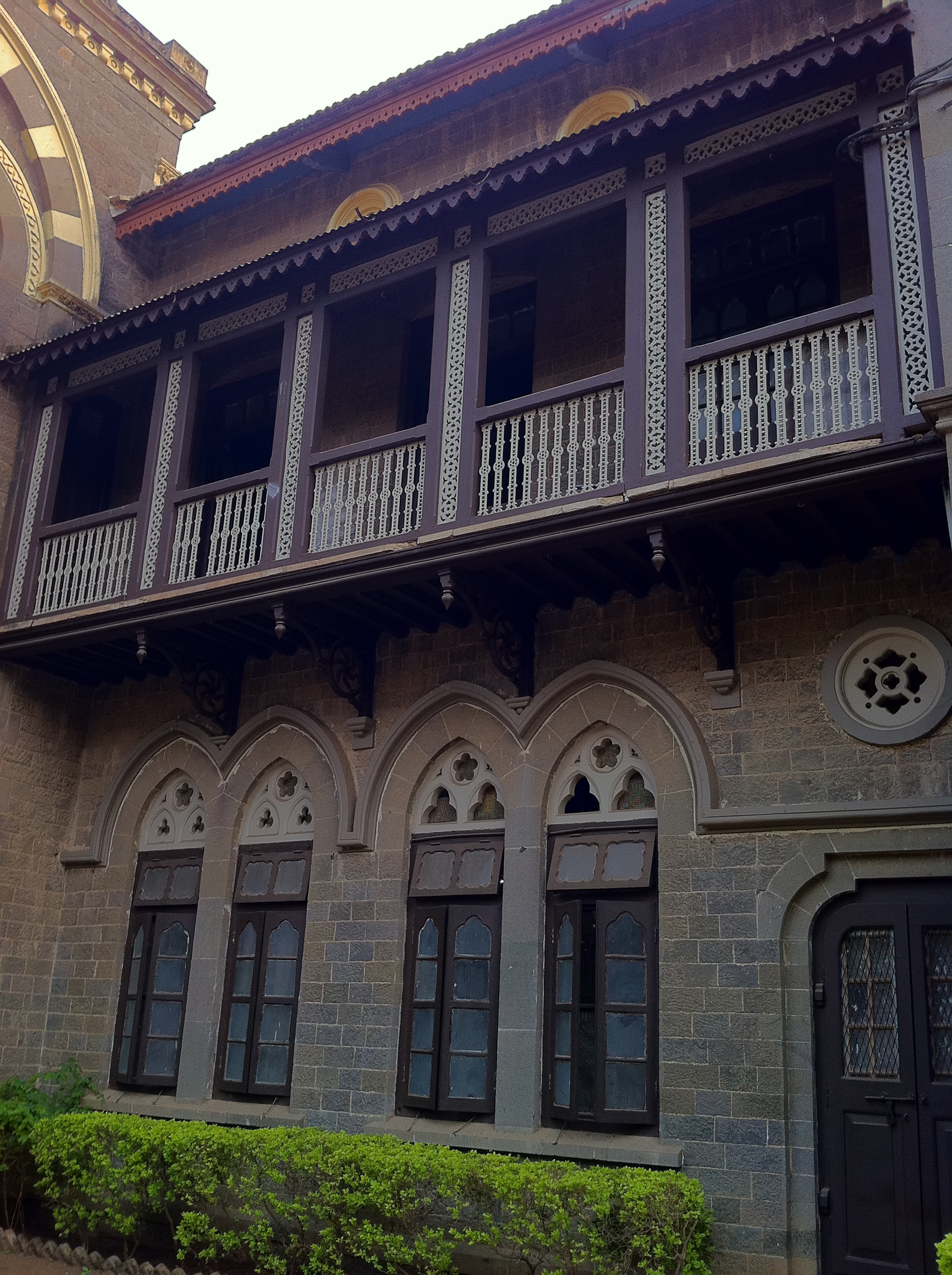
Department of History

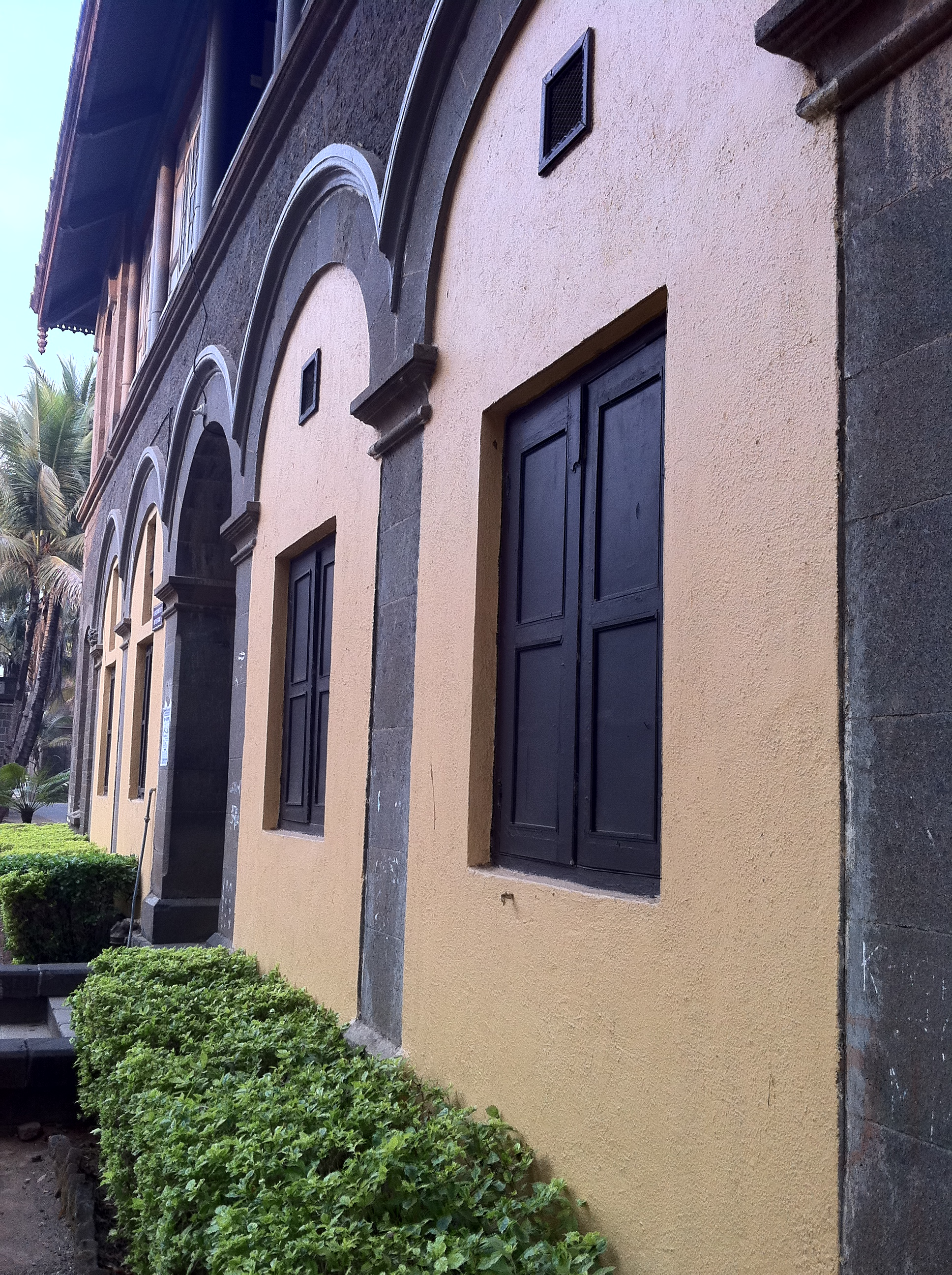
Staff offices

The Main Building is at the inner entrance of the college. Built entirely in Victorian style, the two-storey structure houses the central office and the principals' chambers. The Statistics and Psychology Departments lie to the east of the main building; the Economics Department lie to the west. The computer science and the life science buildings are also to the west.

On the southern side are the RP Paranjpye building, Pittie Chemistry building, Botany, Zoology, Geology, Electronics and Physics departments. The building overlooks the central garden to the north and has two lecture halls and the staffs' chambers. There are 55 laboratories and 51 lecture halls in all.

=== NM Wadia Amphitheatre ===
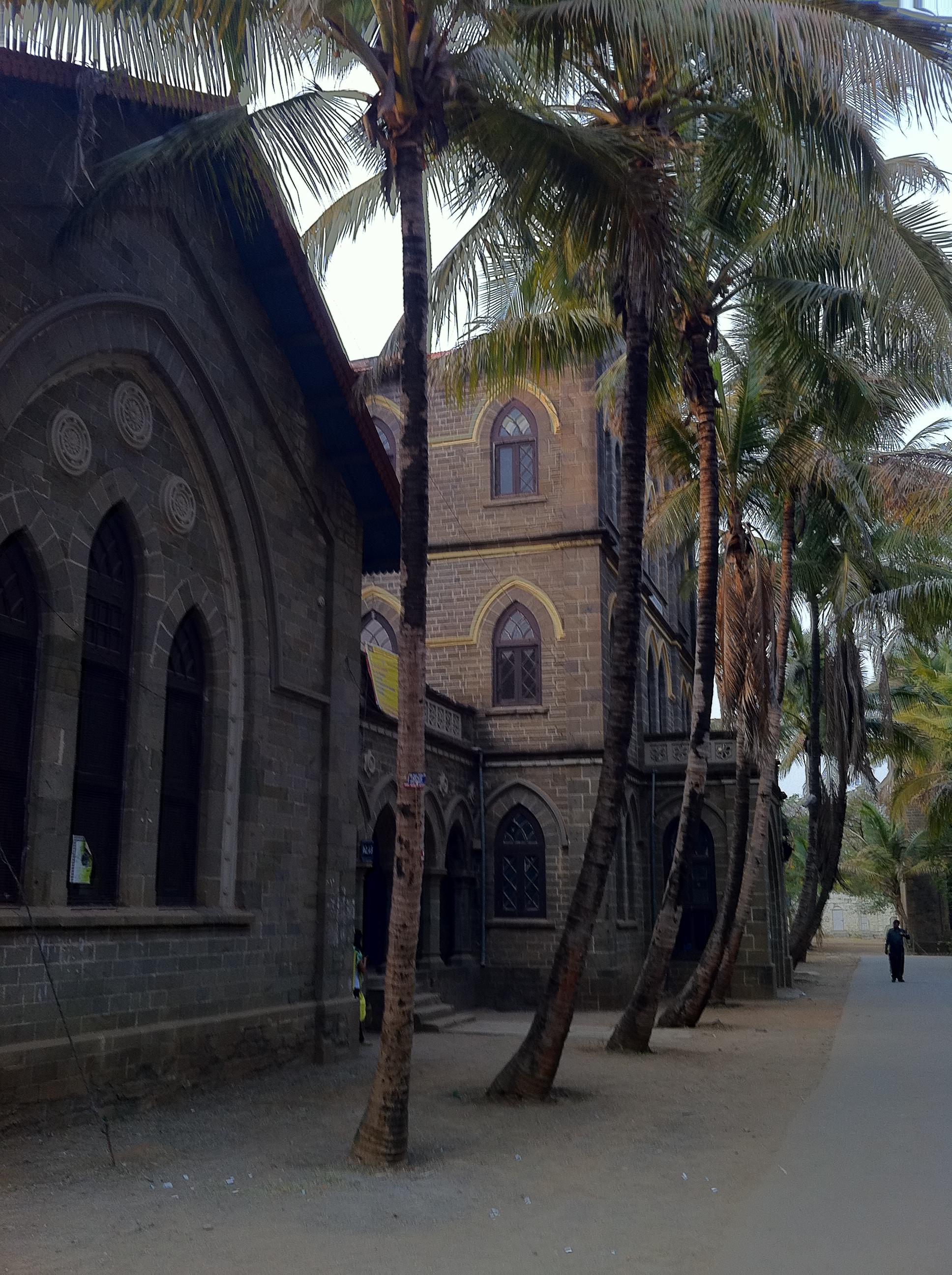
NM Wadia Amphitheatre

The three-storeyed amphitheatre building, to the west of the central garden, has Victorian-Gothic influences. Apart from several lecture halls, the building houses an auditorium with a capacity of 1,000 people. In 2012, this amphitheatre celebrated its 100 years.

=== Bai Jerbai Wadia Library ===
Bai Jerbai Wadia Library was built in 1929 by industrialists Sir Cusrow Wadia and Sir Ness Wadia in memory of their mother. The Main Library on the ground floor has more than 300,000 books and research journals. Research scholars and book-lovers have donated their collections.

The first floor (the floor above the ground floor) of the library serves as a Reading Hall for students and accommodates 400 students. The floors above this floor are not publicly accessible without prior arrangement and house books, manuscripts, and articles of historic and cultural importance. The library has a collection of statues and posters, dedicated to national leaders and educationalists. The building was extended in 1955, with government grants and then in 1982 with grants from the Central government.

=== Kimaya ===
Kimaya is an open-air theatre on the north side of the campus. It was conceived by litterateur and alumni PL Deshpande on his return from a visit to Japan. It encompasses elements of modern architecture and is built without beams. It has eight walls fused together, which function as trusses.

=== Botanical Gardens ===
The 2-acre (8,100 m^{2}) Botanical Gardens on the campus were founded in 1902 by a teacher, Professor Shevade. Botany students from the college planted specimens here, including Elaeocarpus, Araucaria and Mahogany. In 1961, the garden was destroyed when the nearby Panshet dam was breached. Years later, it was reinstated by the Pune Municipal Corporation (PMC), the Association of Herbal Drugs, and Deccan Education Society. Some plants found there are Saraca Indica (Sita Ashok), the bark of which is used to heal skin diseases and as a tonic; and Terminalia arjuna, the extract of which is used to treat jaundice.

=== Gymkhana and grounds ===
Cricket, hockey and football are played on the main ground which has a drainage system, enabling play during monsoons. Two asphalted basketball courts are next to the main ground. A second ground, to the south, has courts for volleyball and handball as well as facilities for Indian sports like Kabaddi, Kho-Kho and Mallakhamb. Services for badminton and other indoor games are available, and the Gymnasium Building provides training for boxing, wrestling, judo, weight lifting and yoga. The college has tennis courts on the eastern side of the campus.

=== New academic complex ===
The new academic complex was built in 2004 at the northern end of the campus. Unlike the other buildings, it is designed in a modern functionalist style. It houses the Junior College and the DES Law College.

=== Residences ===
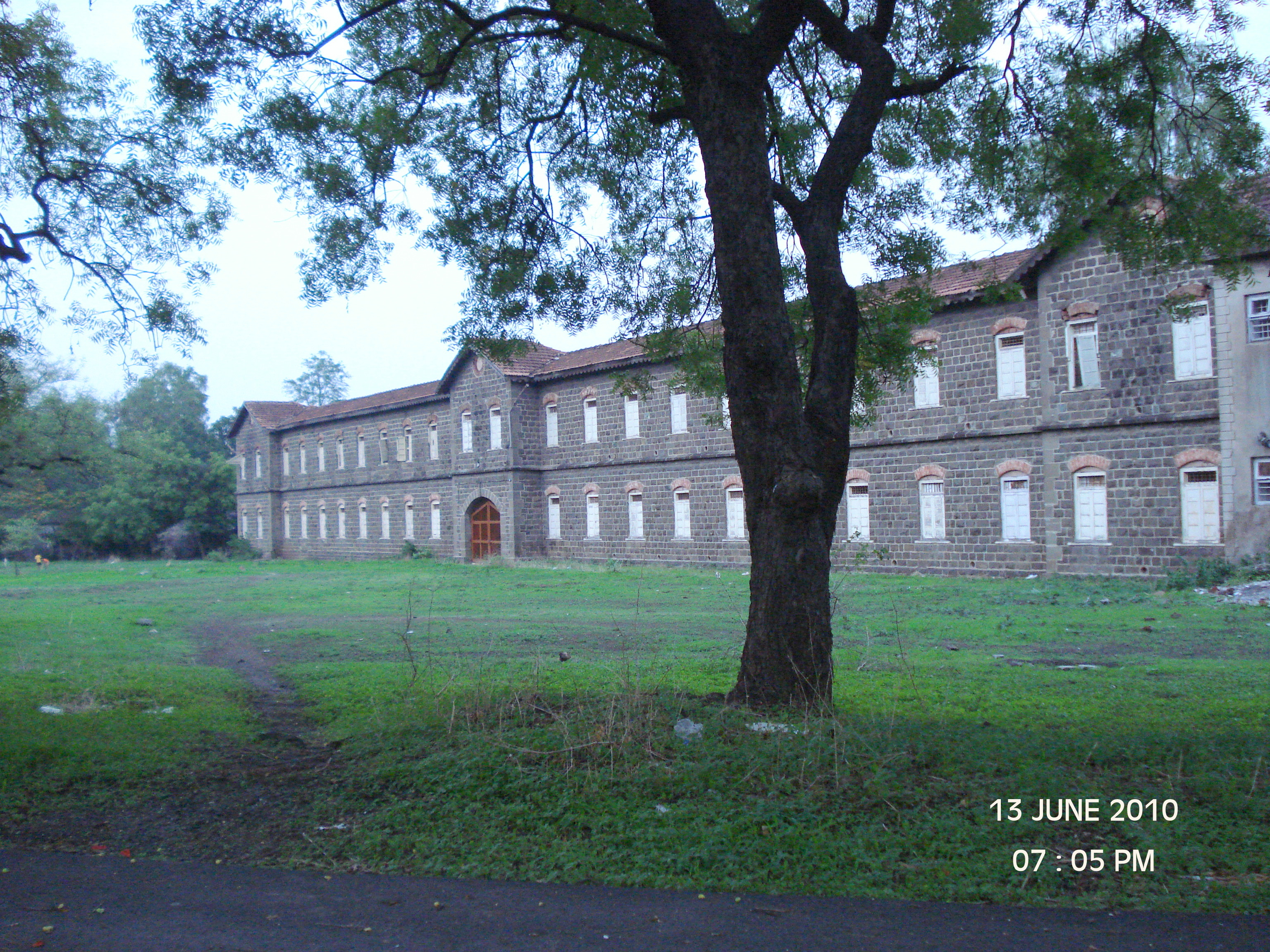
Residence hall

For students, there are six hostel blocks, four blocks for boys and two for girls. The total intake capacity of the hostels is 587 students. The gents hostel blocks are to the north of the campus and the ladies hostel blocks lie to the east.

The college has some quarters for the faculty and staff and also for employees of other DES Institutes.

The principal resides in an independent bungalow at the main entrance of the college. Some members of the teaching staff have been provided with residential facilities on the campus. This facility includes independent bungalows. There are some flats constructed with financial aid from the UGC.

== Academics ==
In 2014 Fergusson College started special courses for upgrading skills of the national youth. The following courses have begun in the same year:

1. Bachelor of Vocation in Media and Communication
2. Bachelor of Vocation in Digital Art and Animation

The courses offer hands on skill experience with overall personality development of the student. The course consists of Photography, Voice Over, Script Writing, Media Research, Advertising, Video Editing, Journalism, Broadcast Journalism, Short Film making, and Media Research. In 2019 and 2020 Media and Communication Department organised Fergusson International Short Film Festival. It was one of the biggest short film festival organised by any college department in India.

=== Rankings ===
The college is ranked 45th among colleges in India by the National Institutional Ranking Framework (NIRF) in 2024.

University rankings

General – India
- NIRF (Colleges) (2024): 45

=== Departments ===
Senior wing of Fergusson University has 14 arts and 16 science departments.

Arts

Departments: Marathi, Hindi, Economics, English, French, Geography, German, Gymkhana, History, Philosophy, Political science, Psychology, Sanskrit, and Sociology.

Science

Departments: Animation, Biotechnology, Botany, Chemistry, Computer Science, Digital Art and Animation, Electronics Science, Environmental science, Geology, Mathematics, Media and Communication, Microbiology, Photography, Physics, Statistics, and Zoology.

=== Associated institutes ===
The college shares its campus with the Institute of Management Development and Research, Pune (IMDR) and Jaganath Rathi Vocational Guidance and Training Institute (JRVGTI), both governed by the Deccan Education Society. Brihan Maharashtra College of Commerce (BMCC), established in 1943, is closely associated with Fergusson College. At the northern end of the campus, next to the New Academic Building, lies DES Law College.

== Student life ==
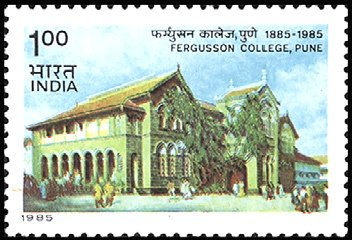
Fergusson College Pune Stamp of India - 1985

=== National Cadet Corps ===
National Cadet Corps training began in Fergusson College in 1921 with the University Training Corps unit which had two platoons. In 1926, the UTC strength of increased to three platoons. In June 1930, one platoon of the College of Engineering was transferred to the Fergusson College and since then Fergusson College enjoyed the privilege of contributing full company — α coy — and was reputed as the Best Drilling Company.

There are two units of NCC in Fergusson College — Army and Navy wings. In the Army wing, cadets are trained by the representative of the Indian Armed Forces at the junior and senior level. They are seen as future officers or army personnel or as possible reserves in the case of national emergency. In the Naval wing, cadets are trained as per the naval rules and discipline at the senior as well as on junior level. They are considered as reserves, second in line of defence in case of national emergency. Apart from these, the open units in the college are Girls Wing, Air Wing, Signal Wing, Armed Squadron and Medical Wing.

=== National Service Scheme ===
National Service Scheme (NSS) is a community service program sponsored by the Ministry of Human Resources Development, Government of India. The motto of the NSS is 'Not Me But You', and its objective is developing the personality of the student through community service.

The NSS Unit of Fergusson College was started in 1975 with about 50 students. Presently the NSS Unit consists of about 200 students from senior college and 100 students from junior college. The activities of the NSS are to help the students understand community, their relation with community, National Integration, and Social problems.

=== Periodicals ===
The photography department, with contributions from current and former students, brings out an e-magazine, Fergzine.

=== Astro Club ===
The Astro Club is an activity started in 1997. Apart from weekly lectures, problem solving sessions and documentary screening, students also organise Physics/Astronomy exhibitions, seminars, workshops, sky observations, Space Week and Asteroid hunt program. "Frontiers in Physics" is a unique annual seminar organised by the students exclusively for the students with speakers from national and international institutions. Students also publish "Dimensions" a special science bulletin each term.

== In popular culture ==
1. A scene from the Academy Award-winning film Gandhi was filmed at the Gymkhana building and grounds of Fergusson College. The location was used to depict a town hall in Cape Town, South Africa.
2. The novel Kosala (Cocoon), written by Jnanpith Award-winning author and Fergusson College alumnus Bhalchandra Nemade, is loosely inspired by his experiences as a student at the college. Much of the narrative contains descriptions strikingly similar to Fergusson College.
3. 1984 Hindi film Holi, directed by Ketan Mehta, which explores student unrest and rebellion was shot at Fergusson College. The film features actors like Aamir Khan and Naseeruddin Shah and includes scenes around the Main Building as well the college's iconic banyan tree, which had just fallen at the time.
4. Some parts of the film The Legend of Bhagat Singh were shot at Fergusson College.

== Notable alumni ==
- P. V. Narasimha Rao (1921–2004) — 9th Prime Minister of India
- V. P. Singh (1931–2008) — 7th Prime Minister of India.
- Aluru Venkata Rao (1880-1964) — Father of The Unification of Karnataka and Karnataka Kulapurohita.
- Vinayak Damodar Savarkar (Veer Savarkar) (1883–1966) — Hindu nationalist advocate, president of the Hindu Mahasabha, Author, Poet, a Nationalist & reformer
- Shubhangi Kulkarni (born 1959) - former India women captain, Arjuna awardee and secretary of erstwhile Women's Cricket Association of India
- Purushottam Laxman Deshpande (1919–2000) — Marathi writer, actor, music composer, film and television producer, film director, music director & a great philanthrope. Famous as "Maharashtra's beloved personality"
- Ram Ganesh Gadkari (1885–1919) — Marathi playwright, poet and writer
- Pralhad Keshav Atre (1898 – 1969) — playwright (Shyamchi Aai (film)); leader of the Samyukta Maharashtra Movement
- B. V. Doshi - An Indian architect, first Indian architect to receive the Pritzker Architecture Prize, awarded with Padma Shri and the Padma Bhushan
- Shreedhar Mahadev Joshi (1904-1989) - An Indian Socialist politician who played a major role in the Samyukta Maharashtra Samiti for the creation of Maharashtra.
- R. P. Paranjpye (1876–1966) — mathematician, first Indian to become Senior Wrangler at University of Cambridge, former principal of Fergusson College
- Shreeram Lagoo (1927–2019) — film and theatre actor
- Burgula Ramakrishna Rao (1899–1967) — activist for freedom of Hyderabad State, 2nd Chief Minister of the state
- Smita Patil (1955–1986) — film actress (Mirch Masala, Manthan, Chakra); double National Award Winner for Best Actress
- Narayan Sitaram Phadke (1894-1978) — Marathi writer
- J. B. Kripalani (1888–1982) — Indian independence activist, former president of the Indian National Congress
- Vishnu Sakharam Khandekar- author, The first Marathi author to win the prestigious Jnanpith Award
- D.R. Bendre - Kannada Poet, Jnanpith Award
- Vasant Kanetkar — playwright, Padma Shri awardee
- Madhav Gadgil (born 1942) — Ecologist, Padma Bhushan awardee
- Sai Paranjpye (born 1938) — Film Director & Screen Writer, Winner of National Film Awards & Filmfare Awards, Padma Bhushan awardee
- Bhalchandra Nemade (born 1938) — Marathi language writer, Padma Shri and Jnanpith Award recipient
- Dattatreya Gopal Karve (1898–1967) — Economist, first principal of Brihan Maharashtra College of Commerce, Vice Chancellor of Pune University and Deputy Governor of Reserve Bank of India
- Irawati Karve (1905–1970) — sociologist, anthropologist, educationist, and writer
- Stephie D'Souza (1936–1998) — Indian athlete who won gold, silver and bronze medals at the 1954 and 1958 Asian Games.
- Noshir H. Antia (1922–2007) — plastic surgeon and Padma Shri recipient
- Radhika Apte (born 1985) — actress
- Padmanabhan Balaram — biochemist, Padma Bhushan recipient
- Pooja Batra (born 1979) — actress and model, Miss India 1993
- Milind Date — composer, flautist
- Bhaskar Chandavarkar (1936–2009) — sitar player, academic and composer
- Chandrashekhar Agashe (1888–1956) — industrialist
- Suyash Tilak (born 1987) — film and television actor
- Prahlad Kakkar (born 1950) — ad film maker
- Suresh Kalmadi (born 1944) — politician and sports administrator
- D. R. Kaprekar (1905–1986) — mathematician, discovered Kaprekar's routine and the Kaprekar number
- Rajendrakumar Sharma – Physicist, tech entrepreneur, and widely recognized as the "Father of Supercapacitors in India" for establishing the country's first indigenous supercapacitor manufacturing venture; he serves as a Meritorious Alumnus member on the college's autonomous Physics Board of Studies.
- Sonali Kulkarni (born 1974) — film actress, columnist and writer
- Shital Mahajan (born 1982) — skydiver, Padma Shri recipient
- Kiran Nagarkar (born 1942) — playwright, novelist
- Vitthal Ramji Shinde (1873–1944) — social activist, founder of Depressed Classes Mission in Mumbai
- Pandurang Vasudeo Sukhatme (1911–1997) — statistician
- S. R. Rana (1870–1957) — Indian political activist
- Kusumavati Deshpande, writer
- Suniti Ashok Deshpande — educator and promoter of Russian language and culture in India; recipient of the Medal of Pushkin
- Kranti Kanade — film director and screenwriter
- Sonalee Kulkarni — Marathi film actress
- Nandini Nimbkar — president, Nimbkar Agricultural Research Institute; member, Senate and Academic Council, Shivaji University
- Babubhai J. Patel (1911-2002) — 6th Chief Minister of Gujarat
- Kaka Kalelkar - Indian independence activist, social reformer, journalist and an eminent follower of the philosophy and methods of Mahatma Gandhi
- Chandrakant Sardeshmukh — sitar player, first Master Fellow of the National Centre for the Performing Arts (India)
- Balasaheb Thorat — member of Maharashtra Legislative Assembly and former Minister of Agriculture and Revenue, Government of Maharashtra
- Damodar Dharmananda Kosambi (1907–1966), former head of the Dept of Mathematics at Ferguson College
- B.S. Baviskar (1930 - 2013) — Sociologist, former head of the Department of Sociology, Delhi University.
- Y. K. Sohoni (1911-2003) - Professor of French (1944–58) and recipient of the Ordre des Palmes académiques awarded by the Government of France
- Devesh Chandra Thakur — Member of Parliament in 18th Lok Sabha representing Sitamarhi Lok Sabha constituency, Former Chairman and Member of Bihar Legislative Council from Tirhut graduate constituency and Former Cabinet Minister of Bihar.
- Gautam Bambawale - Senior diplomat. Indian envoy to China.
- Vasantrao Ghatge- Businessman
- Sriram Raghavan-Film maker, Director
- Kalyani Bondre (born 1981) Hindustani Classical Singer, Economist, Kathak Dancer
- Manu S. Pillai-Writer, Historian, Sahitya Akademi Yuva Puraskar awardee(2017)
- Amandeep Singh — Indian Footballer
- Supratim Bhol - Indian Cinematographer
- Aarya Ambekar — singer
- Parna Pethe - actress
- Manjari Fadnis - film actress
- Ansar Shaikh - Indian Administrative Service officer
