= Dattatreya Gopal Karve =

Indian economist (1898–1967)

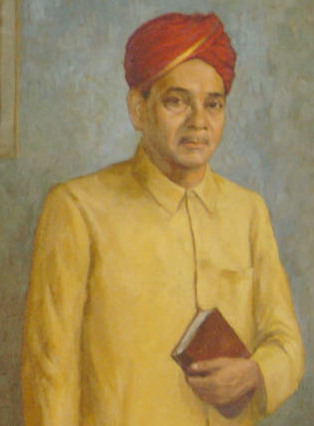
- Born: 24 December 1898; Pune, Bombay Presidency (now in Maharashtra)
- Died: 28 December 1967 (aged 69)
- Education: Fergusson College
- Occupations: Economist; professor

Dattatreya Gopal Karve (Marathi: दत्तात्रेय गोपाळ कर्वे; 24 December 1898 – 28 December 1967) was an Indian economist and professor who contributed to the fields of economics, public administration and the cooperative movement in India. He was also the deputy governor of the Reserve Bank of India from 1962 to 1964.

== Early life and education ==
D. G. Karve was born in Pune, India in 1898. His father died when he was one year old placing a financial burden on the remaining family. Supported by his mother, he studied at the New English School in Pune and later at Fergusson College. He failed a first-year college examination—an experience that spurred him to bring his academic and life goals into clearer focus. He studied under the distinguished Indian economist Professor V. G. Kale, and in 1921 was awarded the Cobden Club Medal for winning first position in economics on his BA examination.

== Academic achievements ==
In 1923, D.G. Karve joined the Deccan Education Society as a professor of economics. In collaboration with Professor Kale he published a book on Principles of Economics in the Marathi language in 1927, followed by a second volume in 1929. In 1932 he succeeded Professor Kale as Head of the Economics Department at Fergusson College, Pune.

In June 1935, the Deccan Education Society appointed him Principal of Willingdon College, Sangli, an institution suffering from low numbers and poor academic standing. By the end of his five-year term the college saw significant improvements in its enrollment, finances and its reputation. He returned to Fergusson College as Head of the History-Economics Department in 1940. He went on to become the first principal of the newly formed Brihan Maharashtra College of Commerce in 1943. Recognition of his contributions to the field of economics led to his election as President of the All-India Economic Conference in 1945 and President of the All-India Agricultural Economic Conference in 1956. He served as Vice Chancellor of the University of Poona from 1959 to 1961. In 1962 Dattatreya Gopal Karve was awarded an Honorary Fellowship at the International Institute of Social Studies (ISS) in The Netherlands.

== Public administration and the cooperative movement ==
Recognizing that economic policies are unlikely to be successful without effective planning and administration, D.G. Karve worked to educate and promote state planning in India. His contributions to public administration included serving as Chairman of the Bombay Administrative Enquiry Committee, and later as Director of the Indian Institute of Public Administration in 1954.

He contributed to India's cooperative movement using his background in agricultural economics to encourage state participation in cooperation. He was chosen to become a Director of the Bombay State Cooperative Bank, Vice-Chairman of the State Bank of India (1960-1962) and Deputy Governor of the Reserve Bank of India (1962-1964). During his tenure at the Reserve Bank of India he served as Chairman of the Central Committee of Cooperative Training – a position that helped spread the cooperative model widely within India. He went on to serve as a special consultant to the United Nations Food and Agriculture Organization. He participated in and chaired several commissions of the International Cooperative Alliance, and was Chairman of the 23rd session of the International Cooperative Congress in Vienna in 1966.

== Legacy ==
In 2005 the Brihan Maharashtra College of Commerce (BMCC) established the Principal D. G. Karve Chair in Economics and Commerce. D. G. Karve served as the first Principal of the BMCC in 1943.

== Selected bibliography ==
- Federations: A Study in Comparative Politics (London, 1932)
- Poverty and Population in India (H. Milford, Oxford University Press, 1936)
