= Lokmanya (TV series) =

Marathi-language historical biopic series

- Genre: Biopic
- Written by: Aparna Padgaonkar
- Starring: See below
- Country of origin: India
- Original language: Marathi
- No. of episodes: 136

Production
- Production locations: Mumbai, Maharashtra, India
- Camera setup: Multi-camera
- Running time: 22 minutes
- Production company: Dashami Creations

Original release
- Network: Zee Marathi
- Release: 21 December 2022 – 5 August 2023

Lokmanya is an Indian Marathi language historical biopic series. It starred Kshitish Date and Spruha Joshi in lead roles. It is produced under the banner of Dashami Creations. The show premiered from 21 December 2022 airing Wednesday to Saturday on Zee Marathi.

== Plot ==
The show depicts the extraordinary journey of Lokmanya Tilak, a staunch Indian nationalist who stoked the self-esteem of fellow Indians stuck in slavery and strived hard to unite the nation.

=== Special episode ===
==== 1 hour ====
1. 19 February 2023
2. 19 March 2023
3. 16 April 2023
4. 23 July 2023

==== 2 hours ====
- 22 January 2023 (elder Lokmanya)

== Cast ==
=== Main ===
- Kshitish Date as Bal Gangadhar Tilak (Lokmanya)
  - Neil Deshpande as younger Balwant Tilak
- Spruha Joshi as Satyabhama Balwant Tilak (Tapi)
  - Maithili Patwardhan as younger Bhama Tilak

=== Recurring ===
- Suyash Tilak as Vasudev Balwant Phadke
- Bhargavi Chirmule as Radhabai
- Ambar Ganpule as Gopal Ganesh Agarkar
- Aarti More as Yashoda Gopal Agarkar
- Vaikhari Pathak-Bhajan as Gopika Tilak
- Saanvi Jambekar as Krishna Balwant Tilak
  - Samayra Patil as younger Krishna
- Swapnil Phadke as Vishnushastri Chiplunkar
- Rugved Phadke as Daji Aaba Khare
- Kedar Shirsekar as Ferozeshah Mehta
- Rushikesh Bhosale as Krushnaji Prabhakar Khadilkar
- Rajashri Nikam as Janaki
- Omkar Kulkarni
- Vighnesh Joshi
- Shalaka Pawar
- Sanjeev Tandel
