= Brihan Maharashtra College of Commerce =

College of commerce in Pune, India

Coordinates: 18.521222°N 73.835287°E

- Logo of BMCC
- Former name: The College of Commerce
- Type: Public research university
- Established: 24 June 1943; 83 years ago
- Parent institution: Deccan Education Society
- Affiliations: Savitribai Phule Pune University; Yashwantrao Chavan Maharashtra Open University; Maharashtra State Board of Secondary and Higher Secondary Education
- Principal: Dr. Deepak Powdel
- Location: Pune, Maharashtra, India
- Website: www.bmcc.ac.in

Brihan Maharashtra College of Commerce is a college in Pune, Maharashtra, India. The college was established in 1943 by the Deccan Education Society. It is affiliated to Savitribai Phule Pune University.

Dr. Deepak Powdel is the current principal of the college.

== History ==
Deccan Education Society, Pune was established in 1884 and registered on 13th August 1885 and by four patriotic visionaries- Vishnu Shastri Chiplunkar, Bal Gangadhar Tilak, Gopal Ganesh Agarkar and Mahadeo Ballal Namjoshi- who were already recognized as the pioneers of new education in India with the Launch of New English School in Pune in the year 1880.

D. G. Karve, an economist and sometime Deputy Governor of the Reserve Bank of India, was the first principal of the college. Karve stated that the mission of the college was to "make a citizen of India as fully endowed materially, intellectually and morally as the citizens of the most advanced country of the world."

It started as the College of Commerce in the Amphi theatre of the Fergusson College on 20 June 1943. Sir Ardeshir Dalal formally inaugurated the college on 24 June 1943. Chandrashekhar Agashe, managing agent of Brihan Maharashtra Sugar Syndicate donated Rs 2 lakhs to the college, which was renamed as the Brihan Maharashtra College of Commerce. The naming ceremony was performed by Sir Chintamanrao Deshmukh, Governor of the Reserve Bank of India, on 11 November 1944.

Until 1949, BMCC was affiliated with Bombay University, which had a larger province under its jurisdiction. After 1949, it became affiliated with University of Pune.

BMCC celebrated its fiftieth anniversary in 1993–94 by opening an academic project, the Chandrashekhar Govind Agashe Business Motivation, Training and Research Centre (CGA BMTRC). The CGA BMTRC Building, the Nav Maharashtra Hall and the Computer Laboratory were inaugurated on 2 August 1998.

In 2005, the college celebrated its Diamond Jubilee with Indian Prime Minister Manmohan Singh as the chief guest. The 'Principal D. G. Karve Chair in Commerce & Economics', an academic research position, was launched to mark the occasion.

== Student Activities ==
Brihan Maharashtra College of Commerce (BMCC) maintains a broad and structured ecosystem of student activities encompassing academic forums, cultural initiatives, service organisations, professional skill groups, and wellness programmes. These activities operate under the supervision of faculty coordinators and are conducted through annual events, intercollegiate festivals, and officially recognised student clubs and committees.

=== Major Student-Organised Events ===
==== Troika ====
Troika is the flagship intercollegiate festival of BMCC and is one of the largest student-led commerce college festivals in Pune. Organised entirely by students, the festival includes competitions and activities across cultural, literary, management, sports, fine arts, and performing arts domains. Troika attracts participation from a large number of colleges and several thousand students annually, and is recognised for its scale, decentralised student management structure, and emphasis on leadership and organisational training.

==== AstitvA ====
AstitvA is the college’s intercollegiate heritage and culture festival, organised by the Heritage Collective. The festival focuses on Indian cultural traditions and artistic expression, and includes events related to classical and folk arts, literature, visual arts, and cultural knowledge. It serves as a platform for cultural engagement and intercollegiate participation, with students from multiple institutions taking part.

==== Anubhuti ====
Anubhuti is the annual intra-college social gathering of BMCC, organised under the Student Council. The event provides students with opportunities to participate in cultural performances, competitions, and informal activities. It is intended to foster community engagement within the college and involves participation from students across all academic years.

==== Late Shri Vijay A. Chavan National Moot Court Competition ====
The Late Shri Vijay A. Chavan National Moot Court Competition is a national-level academic competition organised by the Moot Court Society of BMCC. The competition is open to undergraduate students from law colleges and commerce colleges across India and is conducted in separate categories. It includes written submissions and oral advocacy rounds evaluated by legal professionals, and is notable for introducing structured legal reasoning and advocacy training within a commerce college setting.

=== Student Clubs, Cells, and Forums ===
BMCC has a wide range of officially recognised student clubs and institutional forums that support academic enrichment, skill development, social service, cultural expression, and personal well-being.

==== Academic, Professional, and Skill-Based Forums ====
- Finance Club – Focuses on finance, economics, investment analysis, and financial literacy through discussions, workshops, and practical activities.
- Entrepreneurship Development Cell – Promotes entrepreneurial thinking and innovation through startup-oriented programs, competitions, and mentorship initiatives.
- Economics and Banking Forum – Encourages discussion and understanding of economics, banking systems, public finance, and policy-related issues.
- Moot Court Society – Develops skills in legal reasoning, advocacy, public speaking, and structured argumentation.
- Event Management – Provides practical exposure to planning, logistics, coordination, and execution of large-scale college events and festivals. (Events conducted under event management change every semester. Troika is conducted under event management.)

==== Cultural and Creative Bodies ====
- Cultural Committee – Organises and coordinates participation in performing arts, literary activities, and intercollegiate cultural competitions.
- Heritage Collective – Focuses on Indian culture, heritage, and historical awareness, and organises heritage-based academic and cultural events.

==== Service, Outreach, and Leadership Organisations ====
- National Service Scheme (NSS) – Engages students in community service, social awareness, and civic responsibility initiatives.
- Red Cross – Operates under the Indian Red Cross Society and conducts health awareness programs, first aid training, and blood donation drives.
- Community Engagement – Facilitates student involvement in outreach activities and socially oriented initiatives.
- Students’ Development Board – Works towards leadership development, skill enhancement, and student welfare programs.
- Girls’ Empowerment Cell – Focuses on gender sensitisation, leadership development, and issues related to women’s empowerment.

==== Defence, Sports, and Physical Development ====
- NCC Boys and NCC Girls – Provide military training, discipline, and leadership development under the National Cadet Corps. (Operated under 2 Maharashtra Battalion NCC and 2 Maharashtra Battalion Girls NCC)
- Sports Committee – Coordinates training and participation in intercollegiate and university-level sports competitions.

==== Environment, Wellness, and Personal Development ====
- Nature Club – Promotes environmental awareness, sustainability, and ecological conservation through activities and campaigns.
- Yoga and Meditation – Focuses on physical fitness, mental well-being, and mindfulness practices.

Participation in these clubs and forums is open to students across disciplines and academic years, and many students are involved simultaneously in multiple activities. Collectively, these student-led initiatives contribute significantly to leadership development, experiential learning, and the overall campus culture at BMCC.

== Notable alumni ==
- Ashutosh Agashe – MD, Brihan Maharashtra Sugar Syndicate Ltd.
- Dnyaneshwar Agashe – Cricketer
- Girish Bapat – Politician
- Madan Deodhar – Actor
- Nipun Dharmadhikari – Actor, Writer and Director
- Sayali Gokhale – Badminton Player
- Mohan Joshi – Actor
- Umesh Vinayak Kulkarni – Writer, Director
- Sachin Kundalkar – Director
- Siddharth Menon – Actor
- Sulajja Firodia Motwani – Vice Chairperson, Kinetic Engineering Limited
- Ram Naik – Politician
- Prasad Oak – Actor, director, writer, singer, anchor, poet and film producer
- Sharad Pawar – Politician, founder of NCP
- Cyrus S. Poonawalla- Chairman, Poonawalla Group
- Alok Rajwade – Actor
- Namita Thapar - Entrepreneur
- Amey Wagh – Actor
