= Institute of Management Development and Research, Pune =

Institute of Management Development and Research
- Motto in English: "Knowledge is Power"
- Established: 1974
- Affiliations: AICTE, DTE(Maharashtra)
- Students: ~250
- Location: Pune, Maharashtra, India; 18.523969°N 73.839219°E
- Campus: Urban,0.551 acres (0.0 km^{2})
- Website: http://www.imdr.edu

The Institute of Management Development and Research (IMDR) in Pune, India is the oldest management institution in Pune and is a branch of the Deccan Education Society. Formerly, IMDR offered three full time programs: Post Graduate Diploma in Management (PGDM), Post Graduate Diploma in International Trade (PGDIT) and Post Graduate Diploma in Human Resources (PGDHR), alongside its other part-time programs. In 2011, IMDR acquired AICTE approval and is currently offering a PGDM course approved by AICTE and DTE.

== History ==
The Institute of Management Development and Research (IMDR) was founded by Dr R. T. Doshi and Shri Sumatilal Shah in 1974, as a constituent unit of the Deccan Education Society. They were closely associated with Wrangler G. S. Mahajani, who had served as the Principal of Fergusson College in Pune and later, as the Vice Chancellor of Pune University.

In 1973, Wrangler Mahajani in his capacity as the Vice Chancellor, suggested to the D. E. Society that a new institution be formed to impart management education under its purview. Through financial contributions by Dr Doshi and Shri Shah, as well as their friends and associates, the main building of IMDR was constructed on the historic Fergusson campus.

Mahajani made the suggestion to set up an institute outside the university, with the idea that the professional and inter-disciplinary nature of management education required a different ambience. From 1974 to 1977, IMDR conducted the courses under affiliation to the university. It took over the MBA programme of the MBA Centre of the University of Pune and the DBM programme, run in the Brihan Maharashtra College of Commerce (BMCC, a sister institution) since 1968. Affiliated to the University of Pune, the IMDR is a recognised centre for research leading to a PhD

In 1977, the IMDR became an autonomous institution by voluntarily delinking from the University of Pune. Since then it has carried on its activities independent of the university or other statutory bodies.

== Campus ==
The IMDR campus includes various classrooms, tutorial room, library, a computer center, and an auditorium with the seating capacity of 175. The main campus has an administrative block, students' common room, canteen and other amenities, including the reprographic facility which is made available for students on the campus. The total floor area is over 24,000 sq feet. There are ten residential units for the non-teaching staff and three for the teaching staff.

== Associated institutes ==
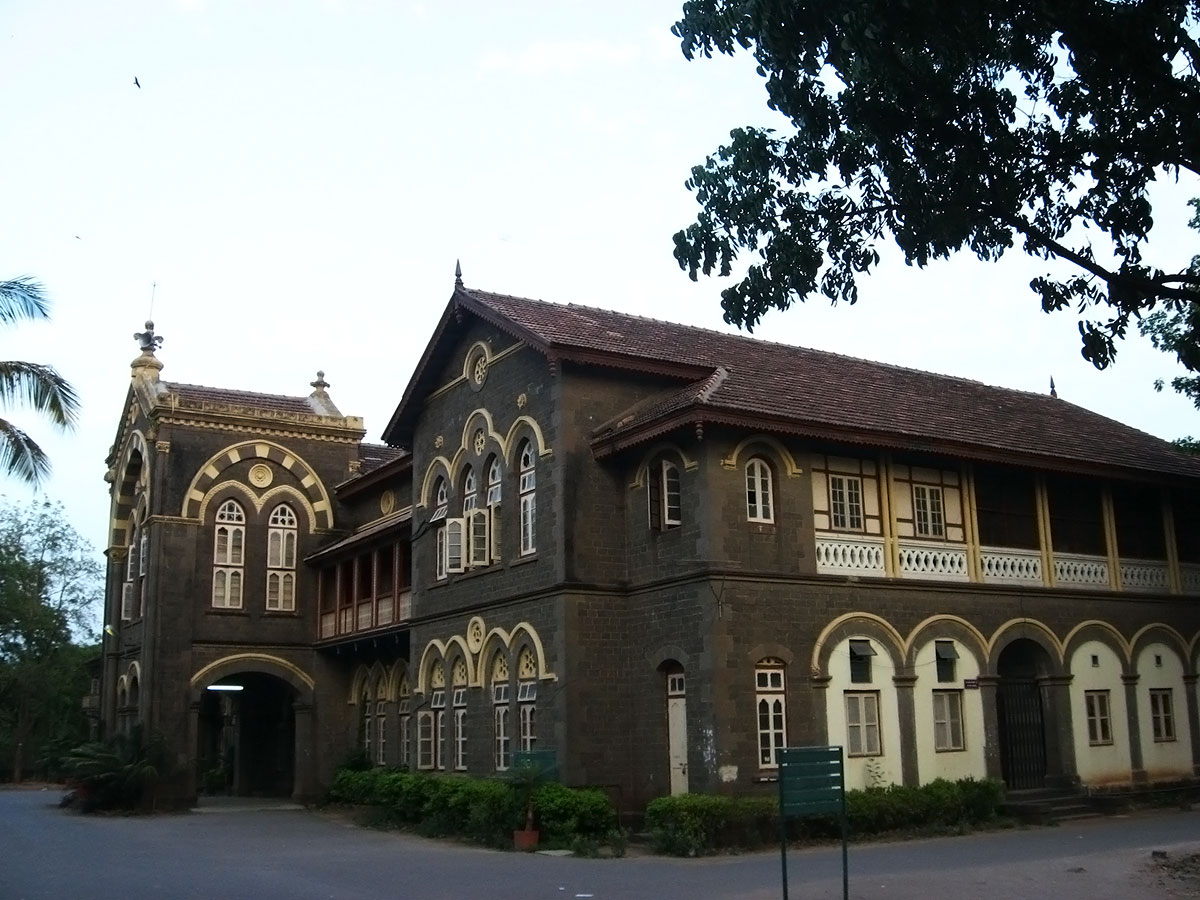
The Main Building of Fergusson College

The college shares its campus with Fergusson College and Jaganath Rathi Vocational Guidance and Training Institute (JRGVTI), both governed by the Deccan Education Society. Brihan Maharashtra College of Commerce (BMCC), established in 1943, is closely associated with Fergusson College. At the northern end of the campus, next to the New Academic Building is the DES Law College.

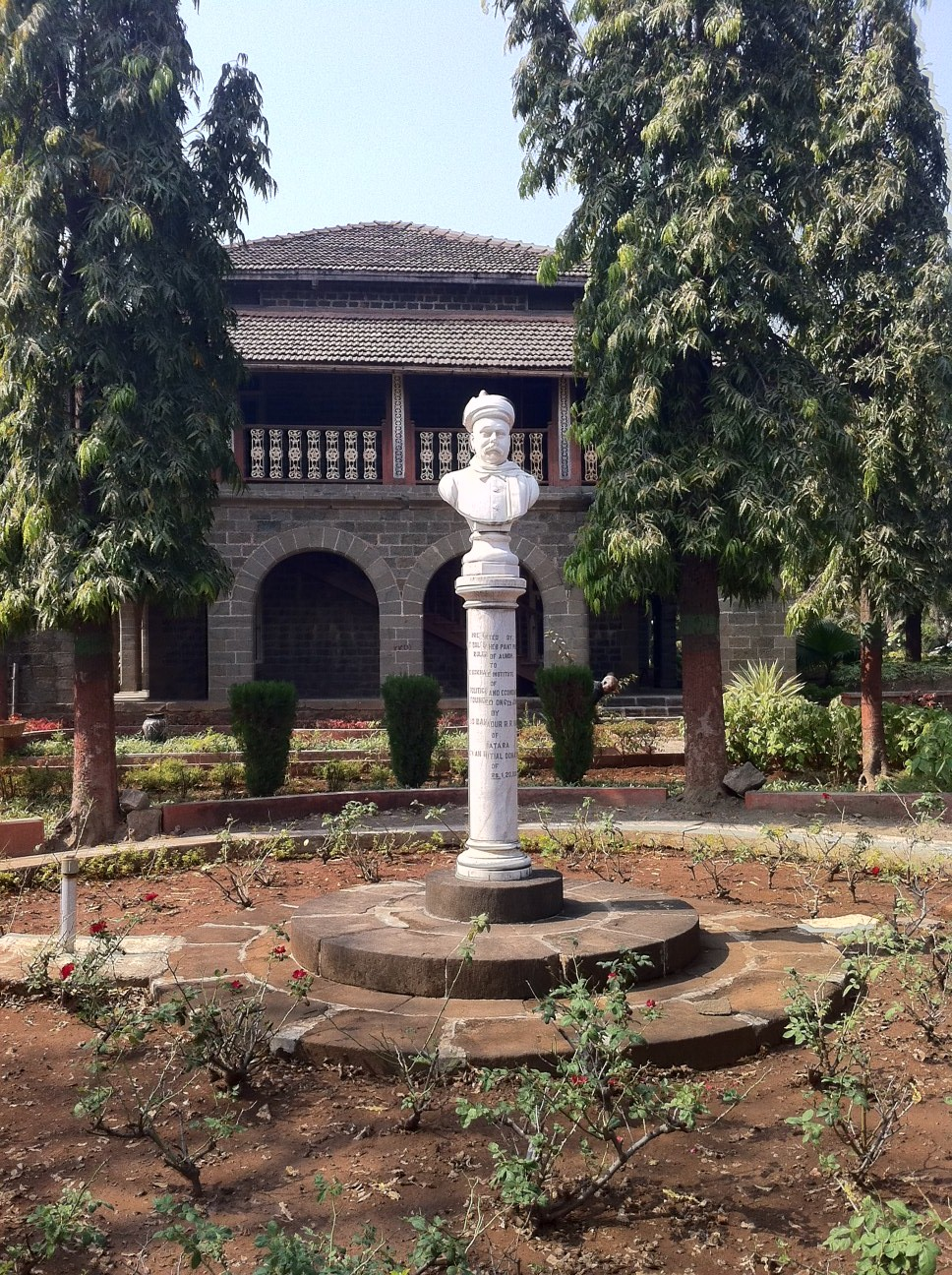
Gokhale Institute

The Deccan Gymkhana area of western Pune is known for its educational institutes. Gokhale Institute of Politics and Economics, Marathwada College of Commerce and Symbiosis International University are other colleges situated around the Hanuman Tekdi hillock that overlooks Fergusson. Also located nearby are the ILS Law College, Bhandarkar Oriental Research Institute and the Agarkar Research Institute.

== Affiliation ==
The All India Council for Technical Education (AICTE) and the Directorate of Technical Education (DTE) have approved IMDR's PGDM programme with an intake of 240 students. The institute is a member of the Association of Management Development Institutions in South Asia (AMDISA), the Confederation of Indian Industry International Chamber of Commerce (CII), the Indo-German Chamber of Commerce, the Indo-French Chamber of Commerce, and the Mahratta Chamber of Commerce, Industries and Agriculture (MCCIA).

== Eligibility ==
All candidates to the PGDM of IMDR are required to take the CAT (Common Admission Test) of the Indian Institutes of Management (IIM). Recently IMDR got AICTE approval and because of AICTE & DTE approval, other entrance tests like MAT/ CMAT/ XAT/ ATMA/ GMAT are accepted. The institute also accepts scores from MH-CET. You can check the admission section on official institute website for latest updates.

== Library ==
The library at IMDR spans an area of 3,570 square feet (332 m^{2}). The library has a total collection of 17,058 books and reference sources, 763 CDs, 231 DVDs, 1,250 seminar reports/ working papers, and 364 audio-visual cassettes. There are currently 77 journals and bound volumes of some prominent journal materiel that have been kept for over 12 years. It has eight English and four local language newspapers, which are preserved for six months and three months respectively.

== Post Graduate Diploma in Management ==
The Post Graduate Diploma in Management (PGDM) is a two-year full-time programme. The programme is divided into four semesters, each of approximately 16 weeks. Classes are usually held from 9 am to 5 pm. The USP of the course is the embedded six months internship program, conducted during the second semester.

== Specializations Offered ==
The Institute of Management Development and Research offers dual specialization for the PGDM course. The specializations offered are Marketing, Finance, Human Resource Management and Supply chain & Operations as Major Specialization. Also the following specializations are offered as Minor: Business Analytics, Entrepreneurship & Start-up Management, International Trade and Business Technology & Systems.
