= Agarkar =

Agarkar is an Indian (Marathi) surname. Notable people with the surname include:

- Gopal Ganesh Agarkar (1856–1895), Indian social reformer
- Ajit Agarkar (born 1977), Indian cricketer
