= Deccan Education Society =

Private education institution based in Pune, India

Logo of Deccan Education Society.

The Deccan Education Society is an organisation that runs 43 education establishments including schools, colleges and universities in Maharashtra, India. Its main branch is situated in Pune.

== History ==
In 1880 Vishnushastri Chiplunkar, Lokmanya Bal Gangadhar Tilak and Gopal Ganesh Agarkar established the New English School, one of the first native-run schools offering Western education in Pune. In 1884 they created the Deccan Education Society with Hon. Justice Mahadev Govind Ranade, Gopal Ganesh Agarkar, Mahadev Ballal Namjoshi, V. S. Apte, V. B. Kelkar, M. S. Gole and N. K. Dharap.The Maharaja of Kolhapur, Chhatrapati Shahu served as the president of the society from 1885 till his death in 1922.

In 1885, the society established Fergusson College, named after the then Governor of Bombay presidency Sir James Fergusson. The college was initially operated out of Gadre Wada in Shaniwar peth area of Pune. At its inception, the college was the first indigenously run higher-education institution in Pune. The college moved to its present site in 1891 in the Deccan Gymkhana area on a 37 acres of land leased for 99 years from Rajaram Naroji Patil Shirole, the patil of Bhamburda village. In its early years Tilak and Agharkar served as academic staff. Congress party leader, Gopal Krishna Gokhale and social reformer, Dhondo Keshav Karve were also life members of the society and taught at the college in the 1890s.

The society established many schools and colleges in Pune and other towns during following decades such as New English School of Satara in 1899. The society took over the Mawjee Madhavjee English School in Umbergaon in 1919, and the Dravid High School of Wai in 1934. In 1919, the society opened the Willingdon College in Sangli in order to satisfy demand for higher education in southern Maharashtra region. In 1939, the Society decided to enter the field of secondary education for girls by starting the Ahilyadevi High School for Girls in the historic premises of the Holkar Wada in Pune. In 1943, the society started the Brihan Maharashtra College of Commerce, for which the Brihan Maharashtra Sugar Syndicate Ltd. gave to the Society a donation of Rs. 2,00,000. Rulers of many Princely states such as Kolhapur, Bhor and Sangli were patrons of the society.

== Institutions ==
Institutes run by the Deccan Education Society include:

Name of Institution	Established	Location
Fergusson College	1885	Pune
Willingdon College	1919	Sangli
Brihan Maharashtra College of Commerce	1943	Pune
Institute of Management Development and Research, Pune	1974	Pune
Kirti M. Doongursee College	1954	Mumbai
Hindustan Antibiotics School	1958	Pune
DES Pune University	2023	Pune
Chintamanrao College of Commerce	1960	Sangli
Chintamanrao Institute of Management Development And Research	1996	Sangli
DES Navalmal Firodia Law College	2004	Pune
DES Brijlal Jindal College of Physiotherapy	2007	Pune
DES Smt. Subhadra K. Jindal College of Nursing	2008	Pune
Rajarshi Chhatrapati Shahu Maharaj College of Agri-Business Management	2009	Sangli
Smt. Jayshree Sharadchandra kothari Business School	2018	Mumbai

== See also ==
- Maharashtra Education Society
