= Krushnashastri Chiplunkar =

Marathi writer

Krushnashastri Chiplunkar (1824–1878) was a social activist, a Marathi writer and a grammarian of Marathi language from the Bombay Presidency, British India.

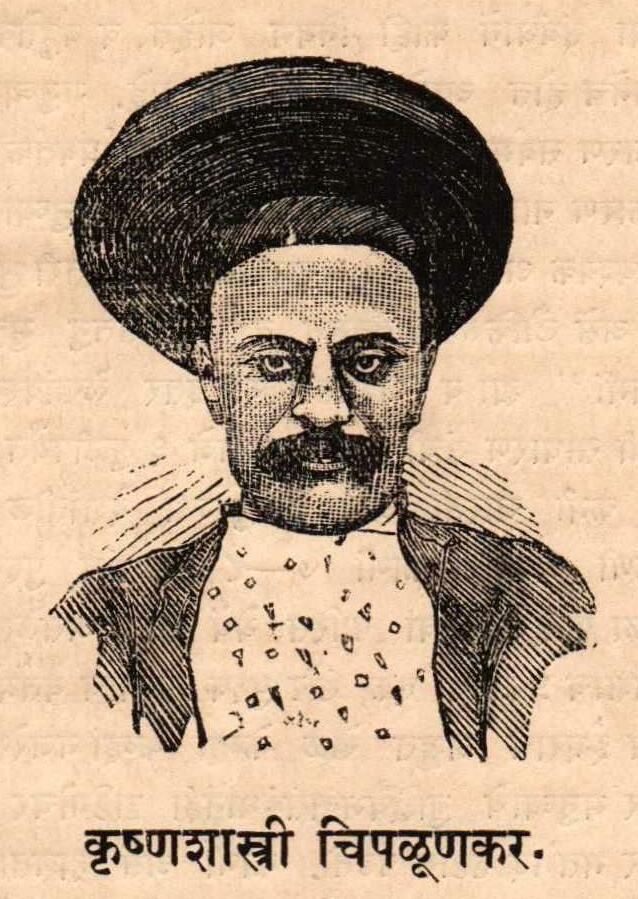
Krishna Shastri Chiplunkar

For some years, he served as a principal of the Teachers' Training College in Pune.

Chiplunkar was a scholar especially in Sanskrit Nyaya (न्याय) (Logic), Dharma (धर्म) (Religion, Law, and Ethics), and Artha (अर्थ) (Economics).Chiplunkar served on the advisory board for the Dakshina Prize Committee established in 1851 to promote Marathi literature, award fellowships, and encourage translations.

Learning English was not common among Indian scholars of his time, yet he started learning it at age 25, and mastered it along with Sanskrit and Marathi. In 1848, he helped establish Pune's oldest library Poona Native General Library, now known as Pune Nagar Vachan Mandir, alongside other Marathi thinkers like Gopalrao Hari Deshmukh.

He was a leading personality in the city of Pune during his life.

== Works ==
- (1852) Vicharlahari (विचारलहरी; lit. 'A thoughtful one')
- (1852) Socratesche charitra (सॉक्रेटिसचे चरित्र; lit. 'Socrates' biography')
- (1855) Arthashastra paribhaasha (अर्थशास्त्र परिभाषा; lit. 'Definition of Economics')
- (1859) Sanskritbhasheche laghu vyakarana (संस्कृतभाषेचे लघु व्याकरण; lit. 'Short grammar of Sanskrit language')
- (1861) Arabi bhaasheteel suras va chamatkarik goshti (अरबी भाषेतील सुरस व चमत्कारिक गोष्टी; lit. 'Engaging and miraculous stories from the Arabic language') (Note: Hari Krushna Damle and Krushnashastri's son Vishnushastri Chiplunkar completed the book in 1890 after Krushnashastri's death.)
- (1865) Padyaratnavali (पद्यरत्नावली; lit. 'Poetry gems')

=== Translations into Marathi ===
- Samuel Johnson's The History of Rasselas
- Kalidas's Meghadoot (मेघदूत)
- Jagannath Pandit's Karunavilas (करुणाविलास)
