= Kusumavati Deshpande =

Marathi writer

- Born: Kusum Jaywant; November 10, 1904; Amravati, British India
- Died: 1961 (aged 56–57)
- Education: Westfield College (B.A); Nagpur University
- Occupation: Writer
- Spouse: Atmaram Ravaji Deshpande

Kusumavati Deshpande (1904–1961) was a Marathi writer from Maharashtra, India.

She was born on 10 November 1904 in Amravati, Central Provinces and Berar, British India, her maiden name having been Kusum Jaywant. Her father was a lawyer.

After finishing her high school education at Huzurpaga (HHCP) girls' school in Pune in 1921, she studied for four years in Fergusson College, also in Pune, before moving to Nagpur and receiving her B.A. degree from Nagpur University in 1926. She went to the UK to receive in 1929 a B.A. in English literature from Westfield College in London. The same year she married Atmaram Ravaji Deshpande alias Kavi Anil and took the name Kusumavati Deshpande.

Deshpande taught English literature at Nagpur University for over 25 years. She also served as the chief producer for women's and children's programmes at All India Radio, and as the convenor of the advisory board for the Sahitya Akademi on Marathi literature.

== Literary works ==
Deshpande's critical essays on Marathi literature were published in two volumes as Marathi Kadambariche Pahile Shatak (मराठी कादंबरीचे पहिले शतक) in 1954 by the Sahitya Akademi.

Four collections of her short essays and short stories have been published:

- Deepakali (दीपकळी) (1934)
- Deepadan (दीपदान) (1940)
- Moli (मोळी) (1945)
- Pasang (पासंग) (1954)

A collection of letters between Deshpande and her husband have been published under the title Kusumanil (कुसुमानिल).

Deshpande presided over Marathi Sahitya Sammelan in Gwalior in 1961. (Her husband had presided over the event in 1958.) She was the first female president of the annual Sammelan since its inception in 1878.
