= Ansar Shaikh =

Indian Administrative Service officer

Ansar Shaikh IAS
- Born: 1 June 1994 (age 32); Jalna, Maharashtra, Maharashtra
- Education: Fergusson College
- Occupation: IAS officer
- Years active: 2016–present
- Employer: Government of India
- Organization: Indian Administrative Service
- Parents: Yonus Shaikh Ahmad (father); Adeela Shaikh (mother)

Ansar Shaikh (born June 1, 1994) is an Indian Administrative Service officer working as the Additional District Magistrate of Malda, West Bengal. He is the 2016 batch IAS officer of the West Bengal Cadre. He is the youngest IAS officer in India, and he joined the Indian Administrative Service at 21.

== Early life ==
Ansar Shaikh was born on 1 June 1994 in Jalna, a city in Maharashtra. His father, Yonus Shaikh Ahmad, is an autorickshaw driver, while his mother, Adeela Shaikh, works on the farm.

== Education ==
Ansar Shaikh passed 12th with 91 percent marks. He completed his graduation in political science at Fergusson College, Pune, with 73 percent. After graduating, he attended private coaching for IAS and cracked UPSC on his first attempt at 21.

== See also ==
- Civil Services Examination
- Indian Administrative Service
- Union Public Service Commission
