= Rajendra Kumar Sharma =

Rajendra Kumar Sharma may refer to:

- Rajendra Kumar Sharma (academic)
- Rajendra Kumar Sharma (politician)
