= B.S. Baviskar =

B.S. (Baburao) Baviskar (1930 - 2013) was an Indian sociologist. He is known for his work on rural change in India with a particular focus on cooperative institutions.

== Early life and education ==
Baviskar was born into a farming family in Pilkhod village, Maharashtra. He completed a BA in economics at Fergusson College, Pune. He moved to Delhi and worked for the Marathi service of All-India Radio. Baviskar studied for an MA, at the Delhi School of Economics, and an MA in sociology at the University of Delhi, where he was taught by M.N. Srinivas. He completed his PhD in the same institution.

== Academic career ==
Baviskar was appointed to the Department of Sociology at the University of Delhi, where he eventually served as Professor of Sociology and Head of department. He served as President of the Indian Sociological Society for several terms. His investigations of cooperatives sought explanations for their effectiveness and social impact. Baviskar initially researched the development of sugar cooperatives in Maharashtra. He tested his findings against the experience of dairy cooperatives in Gujarat, and queried some of the large claims made about their success. Baviskar's work on cooperatives has been described as foundational.

== Books ==
- The Politics of Development: Sugar Cooperatives in Rural Maharashtra (1980)
- (with DW Attwood) Who Shares? Cooperatives and Rural Development (1988)
- (with DW Attwood) Finding the Middle Path: The Political Economy of Cooperation in Rural India (1995)
- (edited with George Mathew) Inclusion and Exclusion in Local Governance: Field Studies from Rural India (2009)
- (edited with Tulsi Patel) Understanding Indian society, Past and Present: essays for A.M. Shah (2010)
- (with DW Attwood) Inside-Outside: Two Views of Social Change in Rural India (2014)
