= Kesari (Marathi newspaper) =

Indian Marathi-language newspaper

- Type: Daily newspaper
- Owner: Kesari Mahratta Trust
- Founder: Bal Gangadhar Tilak
- Publisher: Kesari Mahratta Trust
- Founded: 4 January 1881; 145 years ago
- Language: Marathi
- Sister newspapers: Mahratta
- Website: www.dailykesari.com

Kesari is an Indian Marathi language newspaper which was founded on 4 January 1881 by Bal Gangadhar Tilak, a self-rule activist in the Indian independence movement. Through Kesari, Tilak criticised British colonial policies, social reformers, and moderates within the Indian National Congress, while promoting both Hindu nationalism and Hindu–Muslim unity. He was twice tried and imprisoned for sedition, in 1897 and 1908, for articles deemed inflammatory. Between 1924 and 1935, Kesari regularly published articles and editorials supporting Italian fascism, Benito Mussolini, and fascist Italy. By the 1940s, Kesari had become the newspaper of the Hindu Mahasabha, a far-right Hindutva political party, and of the Rashtriya Swayamsevak Sangh, a Hindutva paramilitary organisation.

== History ==
=== Origins ===
The first edition of Kesari

Kesari was established on 4 January 1881 by Bal Gangadhar Tilak, a self-rule activist in the Indian independence movement, alongside social reformer and educationist Gopal Ganesh Agarkar, among others. One of two weekly newspapers established by Tilak and his aides, Kesari was published in the Marathi language, while its counterpart, Mahratta, was published in English. Agarkar served as the first editor of Kesari but resigned six years later, owing to ideological differences with Tilak over the priority of political and social reform, with Agarkar regarding the latter as more urgent; he subsequently founded his own newspaper, Sudharak, wherein he campaigned against untouchability and the caste system. Tilak succeeded him as editor.

Tilak wrote several articles in Kesari, on issues such as land tenure and revenue, war expenditure, high salaries paid to British officials, and the colonial exploitation of Indian resources, while also using the publication to attack social reformers and moderates within the Indian National Congress. A Hindu nationalist who nevertheless supported Hindu-Muslim unity, Tilak sought to create a Hindu public sphere. Many Kesari editorials described how this sphere was formed and mobilised through religious events, in an attempt to create a shared and cohesive national culture.

In 1897, Tilak was tried and imprisoned for sedition on the basis of views he had expressed in Kesari. The prosecution was triggered by his violent rhetoric in relation to the assassination of two plague officials, W. C. Rand and Charles Ayerst; the assassinations had occurred following the Bombay plague epidemic, after which Tilak had counselled the "murder of Europeans". In 1908, Tilak was again tried and imprisoned for sedition, when his articles in Kesari defended the Muzaffarpur bombings which had led to the Alipore bomb case. On both occasions of his imprisonment, Narasimha Chintaman Kelkar assumed the role of editor.

At one time such oppression gave rise to small insurrections in England; and it was only when the people of that country rose in rebellion, and, after dethroning the King, introduced constitutional rule that no occasion was left for them to resort to violent means for effecting administrative reform.

— Bal Gangadhar Tilak, Kesari, 12 May 1908

=== Support of Italian fascism ===
From 1924 to 1935, Kesari regularly published articles and editorials in support of Italian fascism, Benito Mussolini, and fascist Italy. Across a series of editorials, the newspaper depicted Italy's transition from a liberal government to a fascist dictatorship as a move from anarchy to order. Mussolini's political reforms, particularly the shift from elected members of parliament to nominated ones and the substitution of parliament itself with the Grand Council of Fascism, were also praised considerably. During this period, in 1929, Kesari moved from weekly to semi-weekly publication.

D. V. Tahmankar, the London correspondent of Kesari, was a known admirer of Mussolini. In 1927, he published a biography entitled 'Muslini ani Fashismo' (lit. 'Mussolini and Fascism'). The book detailed the organisation of the fascist state, the fascist social system, the fascist ideology, and Italy's recent history. The entirety of the final chapter was dedicated to fascist society and its institutions, notably the youth organisations. A lengthy Kesari article, entitled 'Italy and the Young Generations' and published on 13 August 1929, claimed that Italy's youth had taken over the leadership of the country from the older generations, resulting in what it described as a "fast ascent of Italy in every field". The discipline attributed to the Italian youth was explained as the product of strong and widespread religious sentiments, close attachment to the family, and respect for traditional values; these values were defined through the rejection of divorce and those who remained unmarried, and the denial of women’s right to vote, with women depicted as having no role beyond the home.

=== Association with Hindutva ===
By the 1940s, Kesari had become associated with the Hindutva movement, serving as the newspaper of both the Hindu Mahasabha, a far-right Hindutva political party, and the Rashtriya Swayamsevak Sangh, a Hindutva paramilitary organisation. Kesari became a triweekly newspaper in 1951, before becoming a daily newspaper in 1962.

=== Competition and expansion ===
In the late 1990s, Kesari faced significant competition from rival Marathi newspapers, which were backed by either corporate entities or political parties. These competitors were expanding rapidly, cutting prices, offering low subscription rates, and launching new editions. Many of Kesari's journalists left to join rival publications, which could afford to pay higher salaries. Kesari could not match these, as it was not a corporate publication but was managed by a trust owned by the family of Bal Gangadhar Tilak. In response, the then editor, Deepak Tilak, oversaw a reconstruction of the Narayan Peth premises, which took several years. The two-storey building had served as the Tilak family residence and the home of Kesari's offices since the time of his great-grandfather, Bal Gangadhar Tilak. It was demolished and replaced by three buildings of more than five floors each, the rental income from which now covers almost the entire running cost of the publication. Several regional editions were subsequently established in other cities of Maharashtra. During the same decade, Kesari also became the first Marathi newspaper to launch an online newspaper.

== Management ==
Kesari is owned and managed by the Kesari Mahratta Trust, established on the same day as the newspaper and run by Bal Gangadhar Tilak's family. The trust instituted the Lokmanya Tilak National Award for Excellence in Journalism, first awarded to Vir Sanghvi on 4 January 2009.

== See also ==
- List of newspapers in India
