= Rajendra Kumar Sharma (academic) =

Canadian researcher and professor (1942)

Rajendra Kumar Sharma SOM FRSA
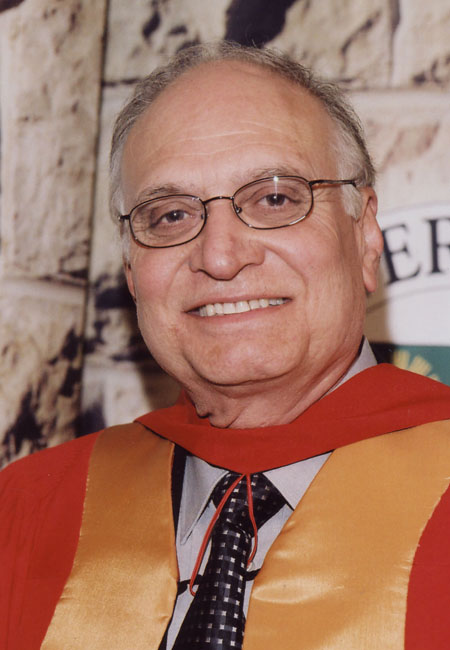
- Born: 2 January 1942 (age 84); Hathras, United Provinces, British India
- Education: D.Sc. in pathology, Ph.D. in biochemistry
- Alma mater: University of Saskatchewan; All India Institute of Medical Sciences
- Occupations: Professor, research scientist
- Years active: Since 1970
- Employer: University of Saskatchewan
- Known for: Calmodulin regulated systems and myristoylation of cellular proteins
- Awards: Saskatchewan Order of Merit; Saskatchewan Centennial Medal; Queen Elizabeth II Diamond Jubilee Medal; Fellow of the Royal Society of Arts, UK

Rajendra Kumar Sharma SOM FRSA (born 2 January 1942) is a professor at the Department of Pathology and Laboratory Medicine, University of Saskatchewan College of Medicine. He holds an earned Doctor of Science from the University of Saskatchewan, and was elected a Fellow of the Royal Society of the Arts (FRSA) in 2014. His contributions to research have been documented in the Encyclopedia of Saskatchewan – A Living Legacy. Sharma has made several discoveries in the areas of colorectal cancer and the cardiovascular system.

== Biography ==
Rajendra Sharma, the son of Venkateswar Sharma and Durga Devi Sharma, was born on 2 January 1942, in Hathras, Uttar Pradesh, India. He spent his childhood in Hathras where he studied primary education at Mohan Gunj Primary Municipality School and higher secondary education at Saraswati Inter College. Sharma completed his B.Sc. in Chemistry, Botany and Zoology in 1963 and M.Sc. in Biochemistry in 1965 from Aligarh Muslim University. He served as a chemistry lecturer at Saraswati Inter College due to the shortage of chemistry teachers during 1965. He was awarded a research fellowship from the Council of Scientific and Industrial Research (CSIR) to pursue a Ph.D. degree in Biochemistry at the All India Institute of Medical Sciences (AIIMS), New Delhi, where he worked in the area of protein chemistry and enzymology. His Ph.D. research work was published in the Journal of Biological Chemistry. After completing his Ph.D., Sharma worked as a lecturer at the Department of Biochemistry, Lady Hardinge Medical College & Hospital, New Delhi.

Sharma married Manjul Saraswat in 1970; they have three daughters, Priya, Puja and Poonam.

=== Scientific career ===
Sharma pursued his postdoctoral research in the field of cancer biology in 1972 in the Department of Biochemistry & Pharmacology, Tufts University School of Medicine, Boston, Massachusetts, US. In 1975, he joined the College of Medicine, University of South Alabama, as a research associate in the Department of Biochemistry. In 1976 he joined the Department of Biochemistry, Faculty of Medicine, University of Manitoba, in Winnipeg to pursue his further research career. Later he moved to the Department of Medical Biochemistry, University of Calgary, Alberta and made several discoveries in the areas of signal transduction. In 1991, Sharma joined as an associate professor at the Department of Pathology & Laboratory Medicine, College of Medicine, University of Saskatchewan, Saskatoon. In the year 2012, Sharma was awarded the title of a Distinguished Professor at the University of Saskatchewan and he continues to serve at the same position to date.

Sharma's research was primarily focused in the areas of calmodulin-regulated systems and myristoylation of cellular proteins. He was the first to report the role of N-myrstoyltransferase in colorectal cancer, which was highlighted in the Journal of the National Cancer Institute. His extensive research studies led to the identification of N-myrstoyltransferase as a potential biomarker in colorectal cancer patients. This discovery was licensed for the development of a diagnostic tool to detect colorectal cancer. Sharma's research has resulted in the identification and characterization of several proteins from various species related to colorectal cancer and cardiovascular system that has led to 265 full-length publications in reputed journals to his credit. Sharma has also co-edited a book on signal transduction mechanisms. He is also currently serving as the Editor-In-Chief of a peer-reviewed international scientific journal entitled "Journal of Molecular Biology & Therapeutics". Recently an article on his decades of dedication to research was published in OCN (ON CAMPUS NEWS) at the University of Saskatchewan.

== Recognitions ==
- Saskatchewan Order of Merit
- Saskatchewan Centennial Medal
- Queen Elizabeth II Diamond Jubilee Medal (2012)
- Fellow of the Royal Society of the Arts (FRSA) (2014)

The City of Saskatoon, Saskatchewan, named four streets in Aspen Ridge in recognition of Sharma's scholarly contributions to science and research.
