= Mahadev Ballal Namjoshi =

Indian reformist

Mahadev Ballal Namjoshi (1833-1896) was an Indian social reformer and one of the founders of Fergusson College in Pune.

Coming from a humble family, Mahadev became an editor of two journals in 1870. He recognized the significance of western education in India. In order to reawaken the conscience and arouse the intellect of the student community, he started new periodicals like Kiran, Deccan Star, Shilpa kalavidnyan and the Industrial review. He made notable contribution to establishment of industrial conference and the industrial association in Pune. He published the Industrial Quarterly Review of Western India in 1892 printed at the Orphanage Press in Pune. Namjoshi was part of the formation of New English school and was also an elected member of the Pune municipality. As an active fund-raiser he persuaded southern Maratha country to contribute towards the establishment of Ferguson college. With his interest in promotion of Indian industry he followed up on several initiatives. In 1888, Namjoshi approached the government for help to establish contact with various artisans, their functioning and imparting them knowledge in modern methods of manufacturing, tools, machine tools and hand machines and also work out who and how would goods be transported. He explored the possibility of active cooperation from the local municipal boards in this regard. Namjoshi also spoke on behalf of specific industries. He stressed the need for protection of handloom workers who couldn't compete against the modern mechanized textile industry. He spoke about the brass metal industry especially about he ignorance and lack of usage of labour saving devices like lathers, hammers, cutters, planing and milling machines.

He was a close associate of Lokmanya Tilak since 1880s. After the foundation of Indian national congress in 1885, Namjoshi complained about the lack of representative committee. Allan Hume, the founder of the Congress choose not to give it serious attention, instead treated him with ill concealed contempt.
