= Vishnushastri Krushnashastri Chiplunkar =

Marathi writer

Vishnushastri Chiplunkar
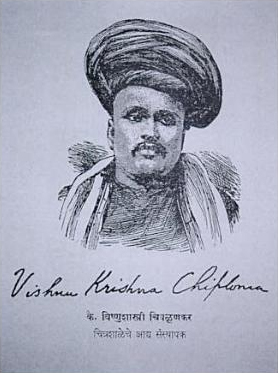
- Born: Vishnushastri Krushnashastri Chiplunkar; 20 May 1850; Pune, Bombay Presidency, British India
- Died: 17 March 1882 (aged 31)
- Occupations: Writer, reformer
- Works: 'Nibandhmala'
- Father: Krushnashastri Chiplunkar

Vishnushastri Chiplunkar (20 May 1850 – 17 March 1882) (Pronounced) was a Marathi writer, whose writings have had a decisive influence on modern Marathi prose style. He was the son of the writer and scholar Krushnashastri Chiplunkar.

== Life ==
Vishnushastri was born in Pune in a Chitpavan Brahmin family to the Sanskrit scholar Krishnashastri Chiplunkar. He obtained his B.A. from Deccan College, Pune in 1872 and worked as a schoolteacher in government schools during the years 1872–1879. In 1880, he founded (together with Gopal Ganesh Agarkar and Bal Gangadhar Tilak) the newspapers Kesari (केसरी, in Marathi) and Maratha (in English). He was also a co-founder The New English School in Pune. These institutions intended to provide a more patriotically inclined education as opposed to the schools run by the government in British India.

In 1878, Chiplunkar founded another monthly named Kavyetihas Sangraha (काव्येतिहास संग्रह) with the objective of better familiarising the readers with the poetry and history of Maharashtra. The same year he established two printing presses, namely Aryabhushan Press (आर्यभूषण छापखाना) and Chitrashala (चित्रशाळा) press, the latter for the purpose of printing pictures of historical and spiritual figures and deities in Maharashtra.The next year, he opened a bookshop named Kitabkhana (किताबखाना), with the objective of making available inspirational books to Marathi readers.

He died in Pune of typhoid at an early age of 32 in 1882. An early biography was written by his brother Lakshmanshastri Chiplunkar, and a later appraisal of his career by Madkholkar.

== Writings ==
His career as a writer began in 1868, with his articles in the periodical Shalapatrak (शालापत्रक, The School Paper) founded by his father. Notable in this period are the critical appraisals of the Sanskrit poets Kalidas, Bhavabhuti, Bana, Subandhu and Dandin. These articles introduced his readers to the 'Western' tradition of literary criticism. They were later republished as Sanskrit Kavipanchak (संस्कृत कविपंचक ). Eventually he became the editor of this periodical, however some of his articles criticising the conduct of the British Government and Christian Missionaries proved controversial, and the ensuing repercussions forced the closure of Shalapatrak in 1875.

In 1874, he started the monthly Nibandhamala (निबंधमाला, A Garland of Essays) for which he is principally remembered. Nearly all of the writing in the 84 issues of this periodical published in 12 years is due to him. His range is wide, and includes subjects such as the contemporary status of the Marathi language contrasted with that of English, Sanskrit and Marathi poetry, and the propriety of using foreign words in Marathi. Aamachya Deshachi Sthiti (अामच्या देशाची स्थिती, The State of Our Country) and Mudranaswatantrya (मुद्रणस्वातंत्र्य, Freedom of the Press) are two of his influential political articles.

He also translated the following works into Marathi in cooperation with his father:

- Rasselas by Samuel Johnson
- Kadambari by Banabhatta
- The Arabian Nights (loosely following the translation into English by Edward Lane)

A compilation of his selected writings has been edited by Buddhisagar.

Vishnushastri's Marathi prose style was moulded on the one hand by his knowledge of Sanskrit, and on the other by his extensive reading into the works of Samuel Johnson, Addison and Macaulay. His writing is characteristic of what is usually called the अव्वल इंग्रजी (High English) period, when Marathi written syntax shows the heavy influence of long, complex sentences incorporating several subordinate clauses, prevalent in 18th and 19th century English.

He is also commonly referred to as the Shivaji of the Marathi language. However, this honorific description was first applied to Vishnushastri by himself, and in fact, was spoken by him in English.

== In popular culture ==
In the Marathi film Lokmanya: Ek Yug Purush on the life of Bal Gangadhar Tilak, Om Raut plays the character of Vishnushastrii.
