= Gopal Ganesh Agarkar =

Indian social reformer and educationist

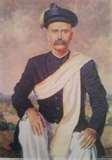
- Born: 14 July 1856; Tembhu, Bombay Presidency, British India
- Died: 17 June 1895 (aged 38); Pune, Bombay Presidency, British India
- Education: Deccan College (B.A.), (M.A.)
- Occupations: Educationalist, writer, editor, social reformer
- Known for: Founder of the Deccan Education Society
- Spouse: Yashodabai Agarkar

Gopal Ganesh Agarkar (14 July 1856 – 17 June 1895) was a social reformer, educationist, and thinker from Bombay Presidency, British India. He co-founded educational institutes such as the New English School, the Deccan Education Society and Fergusson College along with Bal Gangadhar Tilak, Vishnushastri Chiplunkar, Mahadev Ballal Namjoshi, Vaman Shivram Apte, V. B. Kelkar, M. S. Gole and N. K. Dharap. He was the first editor of the weekly Kesari newspaper and founder and editor of a periodical, Sudharak. He was the second principal of Fergusson College, serving in that post from August 1895 until his death.

A locality in Andheri, Mumbai outside the railway station (east side) is named after him as Agarkar Chowk, and another locality in Pune containing the Pune railway station and General post office of Pune (with the Zero Milestone of Pune) is named after him as Agarkar Nagar.

== Early life ==
Gopal Ganesh Agarkar was born on 14 July 1856 in a Marathi Hindu Chitpavan Brahmin family in Tembhu, a village in Karad taluk, Satara district, Maharashtra.

Agarkar was schooled in Karad and later worked as a clerk in a court there. In 1878, he received his B. A. degree, and in 1880 was awarded an M.A. In his early years, Agarkar developed a close relationship with Tilak. As college students, he and Tilak decided never to join government service and pledged to dedicate their lives to the education and independence of their country. Agarkar believed that education was a powerful weapon in the fight for independence, as it would give the Indians the confidence to question the British and thus strengthen the fight for freedom. Agarkar established the New English School in Pune along with Tilak and Vishnu Chiplunkar.

== Social activism and later life ==
During his lifetime, Agarkar was an active campaigner for social reforms, and believed in giving citizens their political rights. According to him India would not be able to rise and be free if the caste system and religious superstitions were not eradicated. He felt that social reforms were necessary for political reforms.

Agarkar was an editor of Kesari, a prominent Marathi-language weekly newspaper founded by Lokmanya Tilak in 1880–1881. Ideological differences with Tilak caused him later to leave. They disagreed on the primacy of political reform versus social reform, with Agarkar believing that the need for social reform was more immediate. He started his own periodical, Sudharak, in which he campaigned against the injustices of untouchability and the caste system. Agarkar abhorred blind adherence to and glorification of tradition and the past. He supported widow remarriage.

In 1884, Agarkar and Tilak established the Deccan Education Society in Pune.

From 1892 to 1895 he was the principal of Ferguson College.

Agarkar suffered from severe asthma throughout his life and succumbed to it on 17 June 1895.

== Publications ==
- Futke Nashib (Biography)
- Alankar Mimmansa (अलंकार मीमांसा)
- Dongarichy Turangatil 101 divas (1882)
- Vikar Vilasit ("विकारविलसित") (Marathi translation of Shakespeare's play Hamlet)
