= Bal Gangadhar Tilak =

Indian self-rule activist (1856–1920)

Lokmanya Bal Gangadhar Tilak
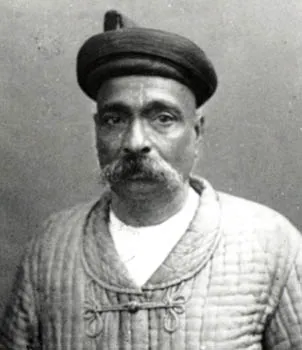
- Bal Gangadhar Tilak, c. 1900
- Born: Keshav Gangadhar Tilak; 23 July 1856; Ratnagiri, Bombay Presidency, British India
- Died: 1 August 1920 (aged 64); Bombay, Bombay Presidency, British India (present-day Mumbai, Maharashtra, India)
- Other names: The Father of the Indian Unrest; The Maker of Modern India
- Occupations: Author, politician, freedom fighter
- Political party: Indian National Congress
- Movement: Indian Independence movement Indian Home Rule movement
- Spouse: Satyabhamabai Tilak
- Children: 3, including Shridhar Balwant Tilak

Signature
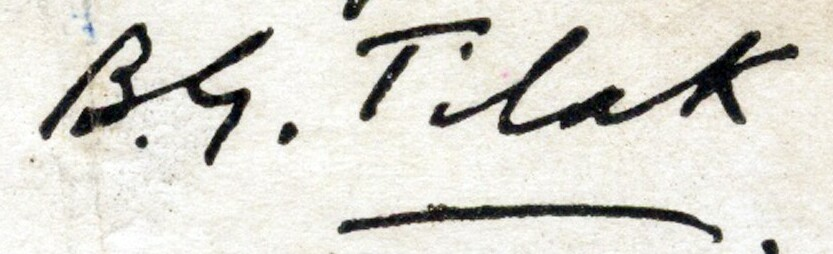

Bal Gangadhar Tilak (born Keshav Gangadhar Tilak (pronunciation: [keʃəʋ ɡəŋɡaːd̪ʱəɾ ʈiɭək]); 23 July 1856 – 1 August 1920), was an Indian nationalist and self-rule activist in the Indian independence movement. He was one third of the Lal Bal Pal triumvirate. The honorific "Lokmanya" (meaning "accepted by the people as their leader") was applied to him by his supporters.

Tilak was one of the first and strongest advocates of Swaraj ('self-rule') and is known for his quote in Marathi: "Swaraj is my birthright and I shall have it!". He formed a close alliance with the leaders of the "New Party" (Nationalists), joining forces with Bipin Chandra Pal, Lala Lajpat Rai, and Aurobindo Ghose to advocate for self-rule. He also worked with V. O. Chidambaram Pillai and Muhammad Ali Jinnah who later oversaw Pakistan's independence from British rule.

== Early life ==
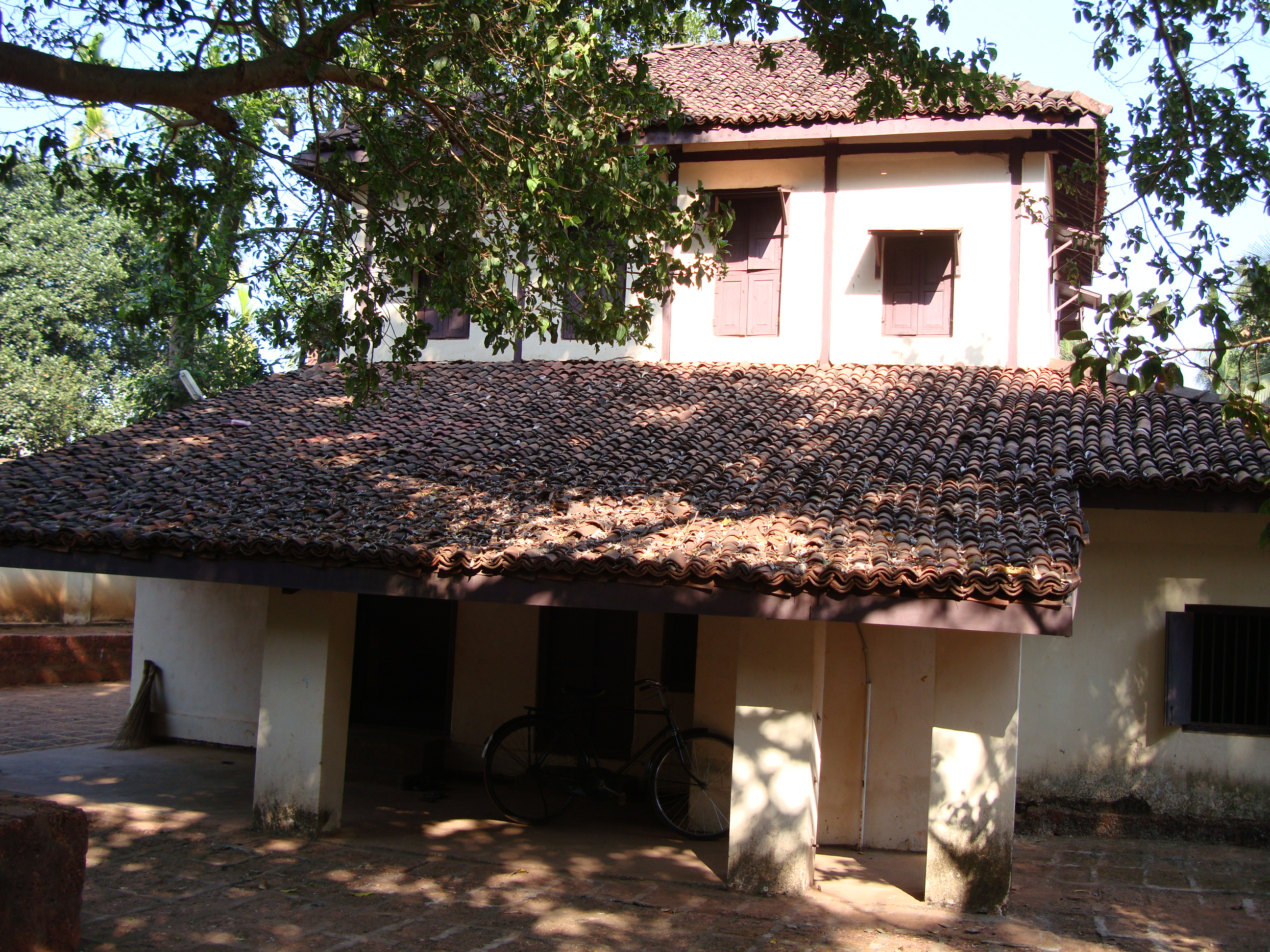
Bal Gangadhar Tilak's birthplace

Keshav Gangadhar Tilak was born on 23 July 1856 in a Marathi Hindu Chitpavan Brahmin family in Ratnagiri, the headquarters of the Ratnagiri district of the Bombay Presidency. The family moved to Poona in 1867. His father, Gangadhar Tilak was a school teacher and a Sanskrit scholar who died when Tilak was sixteen. In 1871, Tilak was married to Tapibai (Née Bal) when he was sixteen, a few months before his father's death. After marriage, her name was changed to Satyabhamabai. Tilak obtained his B.A. in Mathematics from the Deccan College of Poona in 1877. He left his M.A. course of study midway to join an L.L.B course instead. In 1879, he obtained his L.L.B degree from Government Law College. After graduating, Tilak started teaching mathematics at a private school in Pune. Later, due to ideological differences with the colleagues in the new school, he withdrew and became a journalist. Tilak actively participated in public affairs. He stated: "Religion and practical life are not different. The real spirit is to make the country your family instead of working only for your own. The step beyond is to serve humanity and the next step is to serve God."

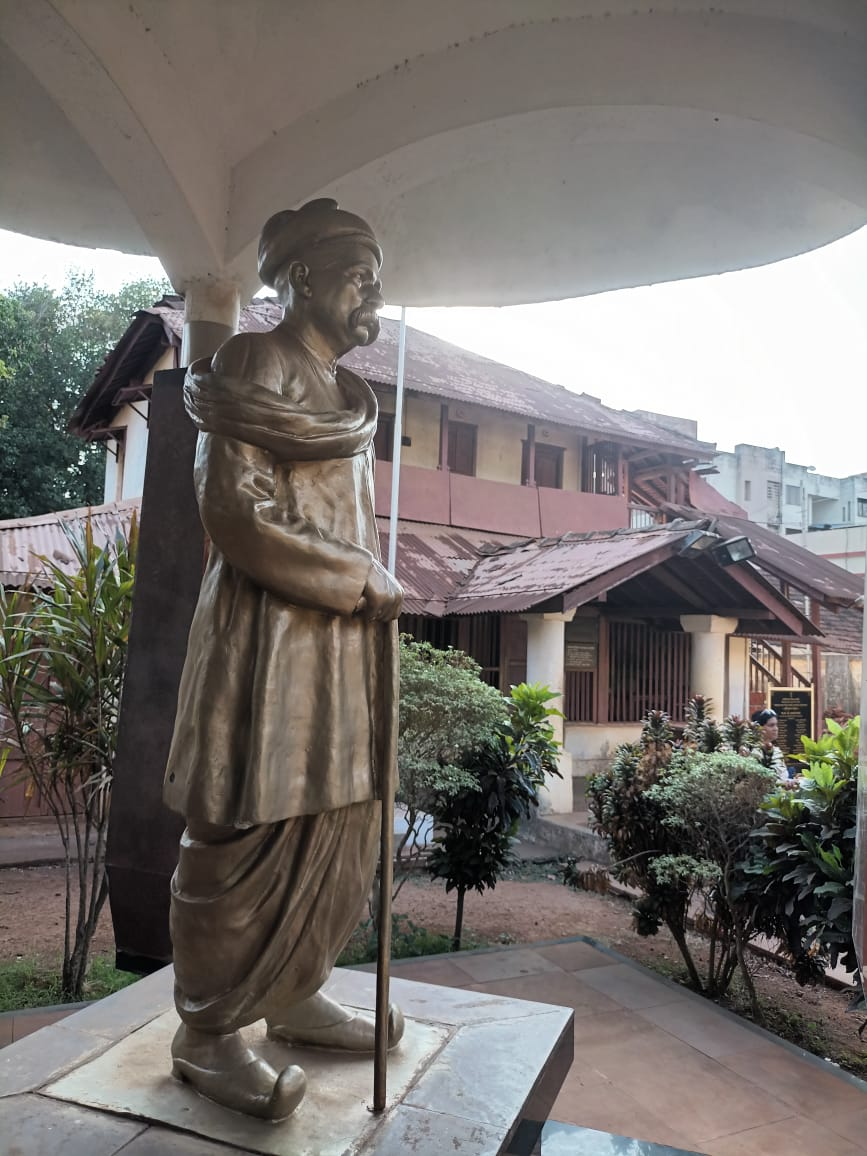
Statue of Bal Gangadhar Tilak in front of his birthplace

Inspired by Vishnushastri Chiplunkar, he co-founded the New English school for secondary education in 1880 with a few of his college friends, including Gopal Ganesh Agarkar, Mahadev Ballal Namjoshi and Vishnushastri Chiplunkar. Their goal was to improve the quality of education for India's youth. The success of the school led them to set up the Deccan Education Society in 1884 to create a new system of education that taught young Indians nationalist ideas through an emphasis on Indian culture. The Society established the Fergusson College in 1885 for post-secondary studies. Tilak taught mathematics at Fergusson College. In 1890, Tilak left the Deccan Education Society for more openly political work. He began a mass movement towards independence by an emphasis on a religious and cultural revival.

== Political career ==
Tilak had a long political career agitating for Indian autonomy from British colonial rule. Before Gandhi, he was the most widely known Indian political leader. He was imprisoned on a number of occasions that included a long stint at Mandalay. At one stage in his political life, he was called the "father of Indian unrest" by British author Sir Valentine Chirol. Tilak is considered to be a conservative reactionary. According to scholar Biswamoy Pati, Tilak "represented and articulated the interests of the bourgeoisie as a class in a colonial context."

=== Indian National Congress ===
Tilak joined the Indian National Congress in 1890. He opposed its moderate attitude, especially towards the fight for self-rule. He was one of the most eminent radicals at the time. In fact, it was the Swadeshi movement of 1905–1907 that resulted in the split within the Indian National Congress into the moderates and the extremists.

During late 1896, a bubonic plague spread from Bombay to Pune, and by January 1897, it reached epidemic proportions. The British Indian Army was brought in to deal with the emergency and strict measures were employed to curb the plague, including the allowance of forced entry into private houses, the examination of the house's occupants, evacuation to hospitals and quarantine camps, removing and destroying personal possessions, and preventing patients from entering or leaving the city. By the end of May, the epidemic was under control. The measures used to curb the pandemic caused widespread resentment among the Indian public. Tilak took up this issue by publishing inflammatory articles in his newspapers, Kesari (Marathi-language) and Mahratta (English-language), quoting Hindu scriptures such as the Bhagavad Gita, to say that no blame could be attached to anyone who killed an oppressor without any thought of reward. Following this, on 22 June 1897, Commissioner Rand and another British officer, Lt. Ayerst were shot and killed by the Chapekar brothers and their other associates. According to Barbara and Thomas R. Metcalf, Tilak "almost surely concealed the identities of the perpetrators". Tilak was charged with incitement to murder and sentenced to 18 months imprisonment. When he emerged from prison in present-day Mumbai, he was revered as a martyr and a national hero. He adopted a new slogan coined by his associate Kaka Baptista: "Swaraj (self-rule) is my birthright and I shall have it." Although Tilak supported self-rule, he did not advocate a complete severance from the British Empire. In 1907, he stated that the precise form Swaraj would assume would not entail a break with the empire. Moreover, Tilak advocated for loyalty to the British Crown.

Following the Partition of Bengal, which was a strategy set out by Lord Curzon to weaken the nationalist movement, Tilak encouraged the Swadeshi movement and the Boycott movement. The movement consisted of the boycott of foreign goods and also the social boycott of any Indian who used foreign goods. The Swadeshi movement consisted of the usage of natively produced goods. Once foreign goods were boycotted, there was a gap which had to be filled by the production of those goods in India itself. Tilak said that the Swadeshi and Boycott movements are two sides of the same coin.

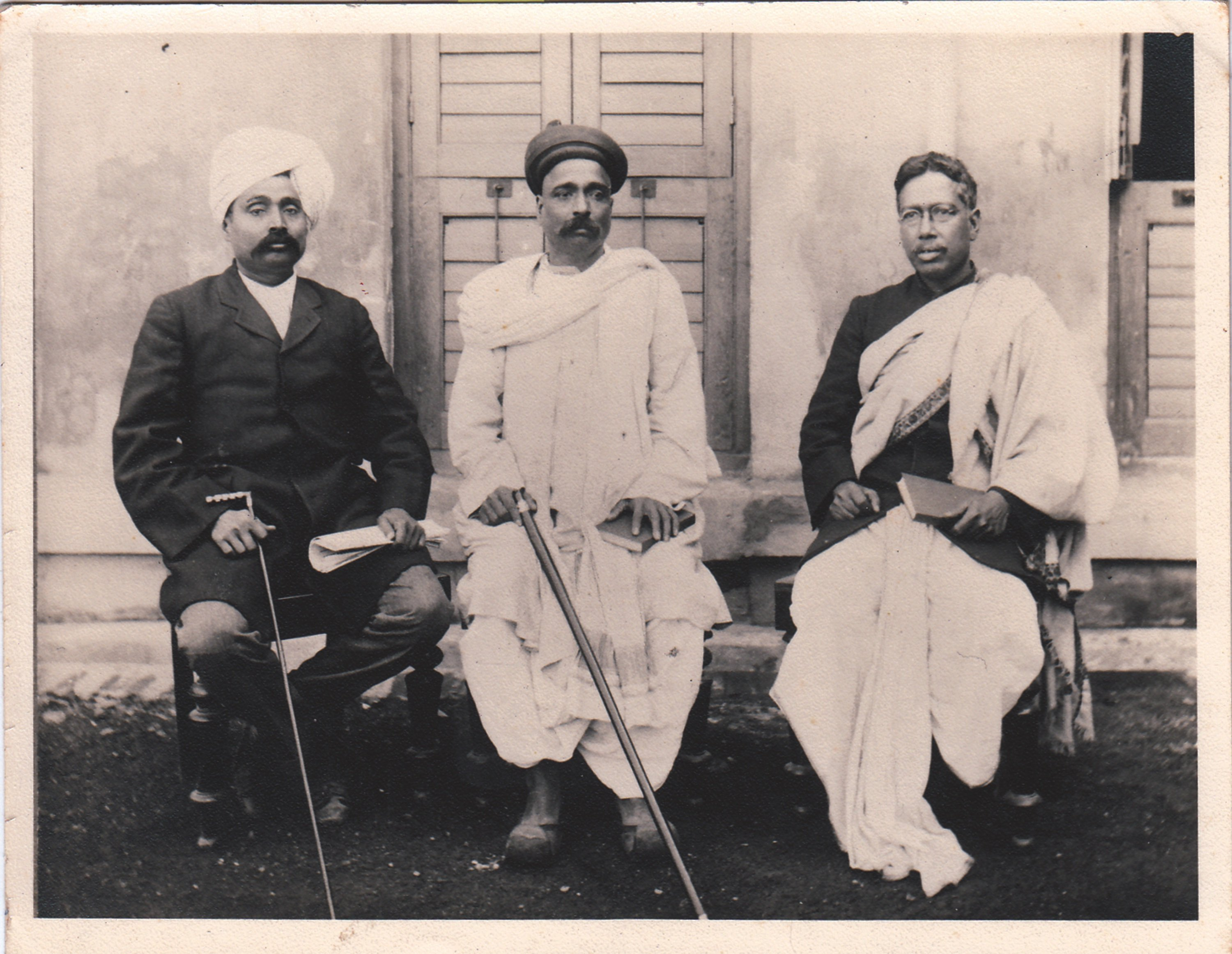
The three pillars of Swarajya - Lala Lajpat Rai, Bal Gangadhar Tilak, and Bipin Chandra Pal, or Lal-Bal-Pal.

Tilak opposed the moderate views of Gopal Krishna Gokhale, and was supported by fellow Indian nationalists Bipin Chandra Pal in Bengal and Lala Lajpat Rai in Punjab. They were referred to as the "Lal-Bal-Pal triumvirate". In 1907, the annual session of the Congress Party was held at Surat, Gujarat. Trouble broke out over the selection of the new president of the Congress between the moderate and the radical sections of the party. The party split into the radicals faction, led by Tilak, Pal and Lajpat Rai, and the moderate faction. Nationalists like Aurobindo Ghose, V. O. Chidambaram Pillai were Tilak supporters.

When asked in Calcutta whether he envisioned a Maratha-type of government for independent India, Tilak answered that the Maratha-dominated governments of 17th and 18th centuries were outmoded in the 20th century, and he wanted a genuine federal system for Free India where everyone was an equal partner. He added that only such a form of government would be able to safeguard India's freedom. He was the first Congress leader to suggest that Hindi written in the Devanagari script be accepted as the sole national language of India.

=== Sedition Charges ===
During his lifetime among other political cases, Tilak had been tried for sedition charges in three times by British India Government—in 1897, 1909, and 1916. In 1897, Tilak was charged with inciting "disaffection of the government" and sentenced to 18 months in prison, for views he had expressed in Kesari, his newspaper. In 1908, he was again charged with sedition for his articles published in Kesari, followed by a trial in 1909. In 1916, when for the third time Tilak was charged for sedition over his lectures on self-rule, Jinnah again was his lawyer and this time led him to acquittal in the case.

=== Imprisonment in Mandalay ===
On 30 April 1908, two Bengali youths, Prafulla Chaki and Khudiram Bose, threw a bomb on a carriage at Muzzafarpur, to kill the Chief Presidency Magistrate Douglas Kingsford of Calcutta fame, but erroneously killed two women travelling in it. Chaki committed suicide when caught, and Bose was hanged. Tilak, in his paper Kesari, defended the revolutionaries and called for immediate Swaraj or self-rule. The Government swiftly charged him with sedition. At the conclusion of the trial, a special jury convicted him by 7:2 majority. The judge, Dinshaw D. Davar gave him a six years jail sentence to be served in Mandalay, Burma and a fine of ₹1,000 (US$11). On being asked by the judge whether he had anything to say, Tilak said:

All that I wish to say is that, in spite of the verdict of the jury, I still maintain that I am innocent. There are higher powers that rule the destinies of men and nations; and I think, it may be the will of Providence that the cause I represent may be benefited more by my suffering than by my pen and tongue.

Muhammad Ali Jinnah was his lawyer in the case. Justice Davar's judgement came under stern criticism in press and was seen against impartiality of British justice system. Justice Davar himself previously had appeared for Tilak in his first sedition case in 1897. In passing sentence, the judge indulged in some scathing strictures against Tilak's conduct. He threw off the judicial restraint which, to some extent, was observable in his charge to the jury. He condemned the articles as "seething with sedition", as preaching violence, speaking of murders with approval. "You hail the advent of the bomb in India as if something had come to India for its good. I say, such journalism is a curse to the country". Tilak was sent to Mandalay from 1908 to 1914. While imprisoned, he continued to read and write, further developing his ideas on the Indian nationalist movement. While in the prison he wrote the Gita Rahasya. Many copies of which were sold, and the money was donated for the Indian Independence movement.

=== Life after Mandalay ===
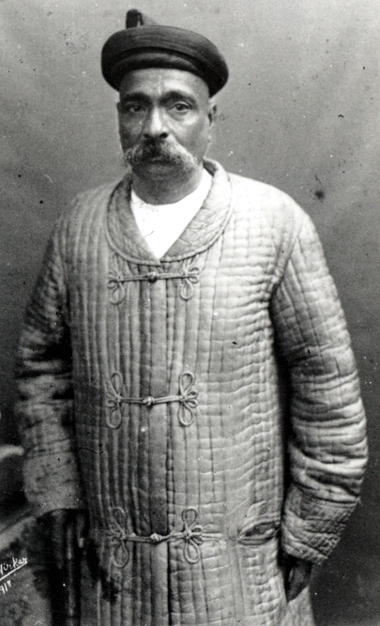
Bal Gangadhar Tilak

Tilak developed diabetes during his sentence in Mandalay prison. This and the general ordeal of prison life had mellowed him at his release on 16 June 1914. When World War I started in August of that year, Tilak cabled the King-Emperor George V of his support and turned his oratory to find new recruits for war efforts. He welcomed The Indian Councils Act, popularly known as Minto-Morley Reforms, which had been passed by British Parliament in May 1909, terming it as "a marked increase of confidence between the Rulers and the Ruled". It was his conviction that acts of violence actually diminished, rather than hastening, the pace of political reforms. He was eager for reconciliation with Congress and had abandoned his demand for direct action and settled for agitations "strictly by constitutional means" – a line that had long been advocated by his rival Gokhale. Tilak reunited with his fellow nationalists and rejoined the Indian National Congress during the Lucknow pact 1916.

Tilak tried to convince Mohandas Gandhi to leave the idea of Total non-violence ("Total Ahimsa") and try to get self-rule ("Swarajya") by all means. Though Gandhi did not entirely concur with Tilak on the means to achieve self-rule and was steadfast in his advocacy of satyagraha, he appreciated Tilak's services to the country and his courage of conviction. After Tilak lost a civil suit against Valentine Chirol and incurred pecuniary loss, Gandhi even called upon Indians to contribute to the Tilak Purse Fund started with the objective of defraying the expenses incurred by Tilak.

=== All India Home Rule League ===
Tilak helped found the All India Home Rule League in 1916–18, with G. S. Khaparde and Annie Besant. After years of trying to reunite the moderate and radical factions, he gave up and focused on the Home Rule League, which sought self-rule. Tilak travelled from village to village for support from farmers and locals to join the movement towards self-rule. Tilak was impressed by the Russian Revolution, and expressed his admiration for Vladimir Lenin. The league had 1400 members in April 1916, and by 1917 membership had grown to approximately 32,000. Tilak started his Home Rule League in Maharashtra, Central Provinces, and Karnataka and Berar region. Besant's League was active in the rest of India.

== Thoughts and views ==
=== Religio-Political Views ===
Tilak sought to unite the Indian population for mass political action throughout his life. For this to happen, he believed there needed to be a comprehensive justification for anti-British pro-Hindu activism. For this end, he sought justification in the supposed original principles of the Ramayana and the Bhagavad Gita. He named this call to activism karma-yoga or the yoga of action. In his interpretation, the Bhagavad Gita reveals this principle in the conversation between Krishna and Arjuna when Krishna exhorts Arjuna to fight his enemies (which in this case included many members of his family) because it is his duty. In Tilak's opinion, the Bhagavad Gita provided a strong justification of activism. However, this conflicted with the mainstream exegesis of the text at the time which was dominated by renunciate views and the idea of acts purely for God. This was represented by the two mainstream views at the time by Ramanuja and Adi Shankara. To find support for this philosophy, Tilak wrote his own interpretations of the relevant passages of the Gita and backed his views using Jnanadeva's commentary on the Gita, Ramanuja's critical commentary and his own translation of the Gita.

=== Social views against women ===
Tilak was strongly opposed to liberal trends emerging in Pune such as women's rights and social reforms against untouchability. Tilak vehemently opposed the establishment of the first Native girls High school (now called Huzurpaga) in Pune in 1885 and its curriculum using his newspapers, the Mahratta and Kesari. Tilak was also opposed to intercaste marriage, particularly the match where an upper caste woman married a lower caste man. In the case of Deshasthas, Chitpawans and Karhades, he encouraged these three Maharashtrian Brahmin groups to give up "caste exclusiveness" and intermarry. (Note: As early as 1881, in a few articles Bal Gangadhar Tilak, the resolute thinker and the enfant terrible of Indian politics, wrote comprehensive discourses on the need for united front by the Chitpavans, Deshasthas and the Karhades. Invoking the urgent necessity of this remarkable Brahmans combination, Tilak urged sincerely that these three groups of Brahmans should give up caste exclusiveness by encouraging inter sub-caste marriages and community dining.") Tilak officially opposed the age of consent bill which raised the age of marriage from ten to twelve for girls, however he was willing to sign a circular that increased age of marriage for girls to sixteen and twenty for boys.

Child bride Rukhmabai was married at the age of eleven but refused to go and live with her husband. The husband sued for restitution of conjugal rights, initially lost but appealed the decision. On 4 March 1887, Justice Farran, using interpretations of Hindu laws, ordered Rukhmabai to "go live with her husband or face six months of imprisonment". Tilak approved of this decision of the court and said that the court was following Hindu Dharmaśāstras. Rukhmabai responded that she would rather face imprisonment than obey the verdict. Her marriage was later dissolved by Queen Victoria. Later, she went on to receive her Doctor of Medicine degree from the London School of Medicine for Women.

In 1890, when an eleven-year-old Phulamani Bai died while having sexual intercourse with her much older husband, the Parsi social reformer Behramji Malabari supported the Age of Consent Act, 1891 to raise the age of a girl's eligibility for marriage. Tilak opposed the Bill and said that the Parsis as well as the English had no jurisdiction over the (Hindu) religious matters. He blamed the girl for having "defective female organs" and questioned how the husband could be "persecuted diabolically for doing a harmless act". He called the girl one of those "dangerous freaks of nature". Tilak did not have a progressive view when it came to gender relations. He did not believe that Hindu women should get a modern education. Rather, he had a more conservative view, believing that women were meant to be homemakers who had to subordinate themselves to the needs of their husbands and children. Tilak refused to sign a petition for the abolition of untouchability in 1918, two years before his death, although he had spoken against it earlier in a meeting.

The Phules established additional schools in Pune specifically for girls, Shudras, and Ati-Shudras, who were vulnerable groups. This initiative, however, sparked outrage from some upper caste Indian nationalists, notably Bal Gangadhar Tilak. Tilak voiced disapproval of schools for girls and non-Brahmins, expressing concerns that such endeavours would lead to a "loss of nationality," as they equated adherence to caste rules with national identity. Consequently, the social pressure exerted on Jyotirao's father, Govindrao, compelled him to evict Jyotirao and Savitribai Phule from their home.

Tilak also expressed repeated disdain for the social reformer Pandita Ramabai, including her support for widows and girls schools.

=== Esteem for Swami Vivekananda ===
Tilak and Swami Vivekananda had great mutual respect and esteem for each other. They met accidentally while travelling by train in 1892 and Tilak had Vivekananda as a guest in his house. A person who was present there(Basukaka), heard that it was agreed between Vivekananda and Tilak that Tilak would work towards nationalism in the "political" arena, while Vivekananda would work for nationalism in the "religious" arena. When Vivekananda died at a young age, Tilak expressed great sorrow and paid tributes to him in Kesari. (Note: THE RELATIONS OF TILAK AND VIVEKANANDA The personal relations between Tilak and Swami Vivekananda (1863– 1902) were marked by great mutual regards and esteem. In 1892, Tilak was returning from Bombay to Poona and had occupied a seat in a second-class railway compartment. Some Gujaratis accompanied Swami Vivekananda who also came and sat in the same compartment. The Gujarati introduced the Swami to Tilak and requested the Swami to stay with the latter.) (Note: 93. Among the Congressmen there was one exception and that was Bal Gangadhar Tilak, whose patriotism was marked by 'sacrifice, scholastic fervour and militancy.'94 Tilak a great scholar, was also a fearless patriot, who wanted to meet the challenge of British imperialism with passive resistance and boycott of British goods. This programme came to the forefront in 1905–07, some years after the death of Swami Vivekananda. It would be useless to speculate what Swamiji would have ...) (Note: Here it will not be out of place to refer to Tilak's views of Swami Vivekananda whom he did not know intimately; but Swamiji's dynamic personality and powerful exposition of the Vedantic doctrine, could not fail to impress Tilak. When Swamiji's great soul sought eternal rest on 4 July 1902, Tilak, paying his tributes to him, wrote in his Kesari: "No Hindu who has the interest of Hinduism at his heart, can help feeling grieved over Swami Vivekananda's Samadhi") (Note: According to Basukaka, when Swamiji was living in Tilak's house as the latter's guest, Basukaka, who was present there, heard that it was agreed between Vivekananda and Tilak that Tilak would work for nationalism in the political field, while Vivekananda would work for nationalism in the religious field. Tilak and Vivekananda Now let us see what Tilak had himself to say about the meeting he had with Swamiji. Writing in the Vedanta Kesari (January •934), Tilak recalled the meeting.) Tilak said about Vivekananda:

"No Hindu who has the interests of Hinduism at his heart, could help feeling grieved over Vivekananda's samadhi. Vivekananda, in short, had taken the work of keeping the banner of Advaita philosophy forever flying among all the nations of the world and made them realize the true greatness of Hindu religion and of the Hindu people. He had hoped that he would crown his achievement with the fulfillment of this task by virtue of his learning, eloquence, enthusiasm and sincerity, just as he had laid a secure foundation for it; but with Swami's samadhi, these hopes have gone. Thousands of years ago, another saint, Shankaracharya, who showed to the world the glory and greatness of Hinduism. At the fag of the 19th century, the second Shankaracharya is Vivekananda, who showed to the world the glory of Hinduism. His work has yet to be completed. We have lost our glory, our independence, everything." (Note: ... Vivekanand was another powerful influence in turning the thoughts of Tilak from western to eastern philosophy. No Hindu, he says, who, has the interests of Hinduism at his heart, could help to feel grieved over Vivekananda's samadhi. ...Vivekananda, in short, had taken the work of keeping the banner of Advaita philosophy forever flying among all the nations of the world and made them realize the true greatness of Hindu religion and of the Hindu people. He had hoped that he would crown his achievement with the fulfillment of this task by virtue of his learning, eloquence, enthusiasm, and sincerity, just as he had laid a secure foundation for it; but with Swami's samadhi, these hopes have gone. Thousands of years ago, another saint, Shankaracharya, showed to the world the glory and greatness of Hinduism. At the fag of the 19th century, the second Shankaracharya is Vivekananda, who, showed to the world the glory of Hinduism. His work has yet to be completed. We have lost our glory, our independence, everything.)

=== Caste issues ===
Shahu, the ruler of the princely state of Kolhapur, had several conflicts with Tilak as the latter agreed with the Brahmins decision of Puranic rituals for the Marathas that were intended for Shudras. Tilak even suggested that the Marathas should be "content" with the Shudra status assigned to them by the Brahmins. Tilak's newspapers, as well as the press in Kolhapur, criticised Shahu for his caste prejudice and his unreasoned hostility towards Brahmins. These included serious allegations such as sexual assaults by Shahu against four Brahmin women. An English woman named Lady Minto was petitioned to help them. The agent of Shahu had blamed these allegations on the "troublesome brahmins". Tilak and another Brahmin suffered from the confiscation of estates by Shahu, the first during a quarrel between Shahu and the Shankaracharya of Sankareshwar and later in another issue. (Note: This connection with the British has tended to obscure an equally important significance in Shahu's exchanges with Tilak, especially in the dispute over the Vedokta, the right of Shahu's family and of other Marathas to use the Vedic rituals of the twice-born Kshatriya, rather than the puranic rituals and shudra status with which Tilak and conservative Brahman opinion held that the Marathas should be content.) (Note: The anti-durbar pressin kolhapur aligned itself with Tilak's newspapers and reproved Shahu for his caste prejudice and his unreasoned hostility towards Brahmins. To the Bombay government, and to the Vicereine herself, the Brahmins in Kolhapur presented themselves as the victims of a ruthless persecution by the Maharaja. .....Both Natu and Tilak suffered from the durbar's confiscation of estates – first during the confiscation of estates in Kolhapur – the first during a quarrel between Shahu and the Shankaracharya of Sankareshwar. S ee, for example, Samarth, 8 August 1906, quoted in I. Copland, 'The Maharaja of Kolhapur', in Modern Asian studies, vol II, no 2(April 1973), 218. In 1906, the 'poor helpless women' of Kolhapur petitioned Lady Minto alleging that four Brahmin ladies had been forcibly seduced by the Maharaja and that the Political Agent had refused to act in the matter. Broadsheets were distributed maintaining 'no beautiful woman is immune from the violence of the Maharaja...and the Brahmins being special objects of hatred no Brahmin women can hope to escape this shameful fate'...But the agent blamed everything on the troublesome brahmins.)

Bal Gangadhar Tilak was released from prison on 16 June 1914. He commented:

‘If we can prove to the non-Brahmins, by example, that we are wholly on their side in their demands from the Government, I am sure that in times to come their agitation, now based on social inequality, will merge into our struggle.’

‘If a God were to tolerate untouchability, I would not recognise him as God at all.’

== Social contributions ==
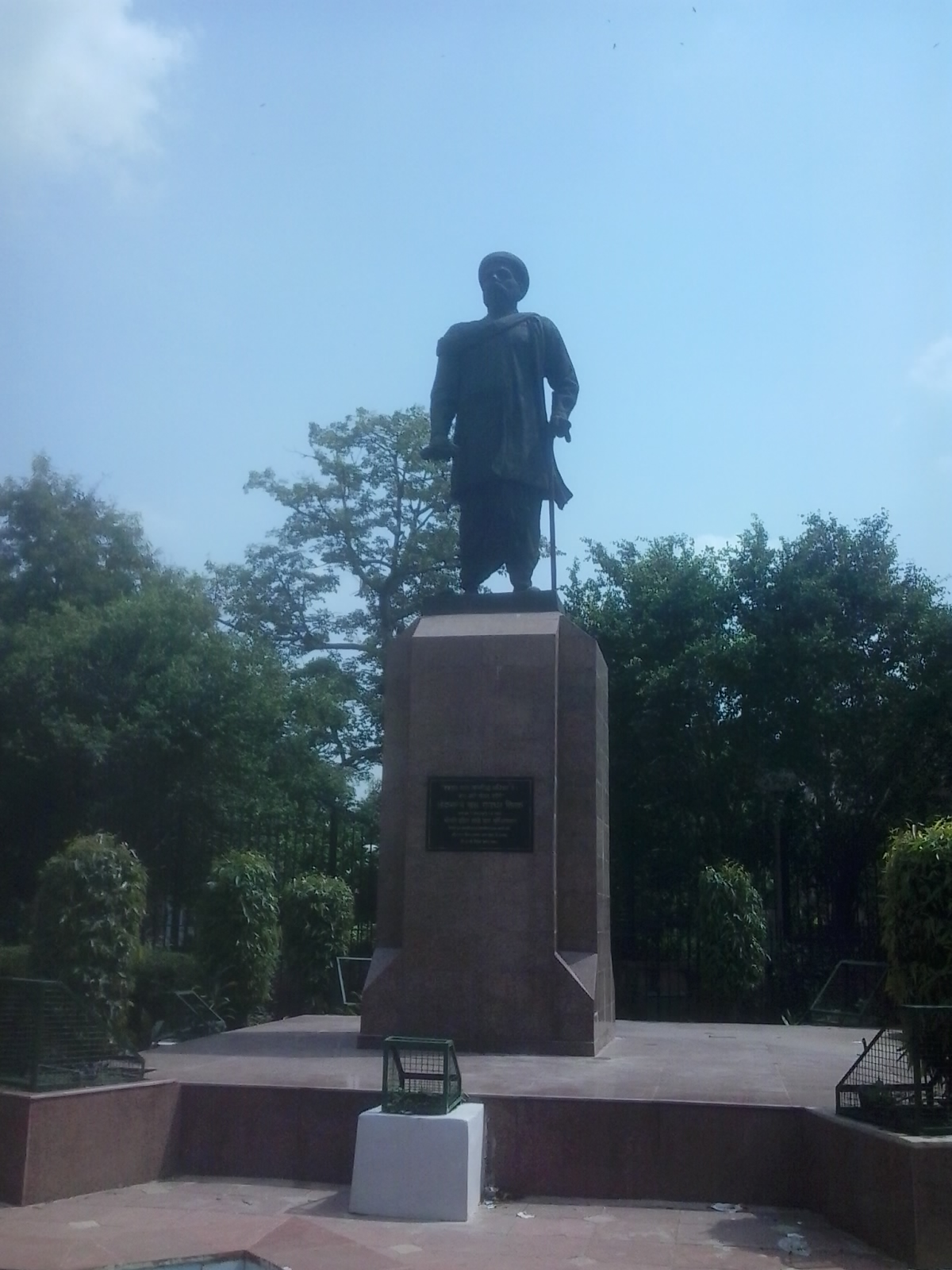
Statue of Tilak near Supreme Court of Delhi

Tilak started two weeklies, Kesari in Marathi and Mahratta in English (sometimes referred as 'Maratha') in 1880–1881 with Gopal Ganesh Agarkar as the first editor. In 1894, Tilak transformed the household worshipping of Ganesha into a grand public event (Sarvajanik Ganeshotsav). The celebrations consisted of several days of processions, music, and food. They were organised by the means of subscriptions by neighbourhood, caste, or occupation. Students often would celebrate Hindu and national glory and address political issues; including patronage of Swadeshi goods. In 1895, Tilak founded the Shri Shivaji Fund Committee for the celebration of "Shiv Jayanti", the birth anniversary of Shivaji, the founder of the Maratha Empire. The project also had the objective of funding the reconstruction of the tomb (Samadhi) of Shivaji at Raigad Fort. For this second objective, Tilak established the Shri Shivaji Raigad Smarak Mandal along with Senapati Khanderao Dabhade II of Talegaon Dabhade, who became the founder President of the Mandal.

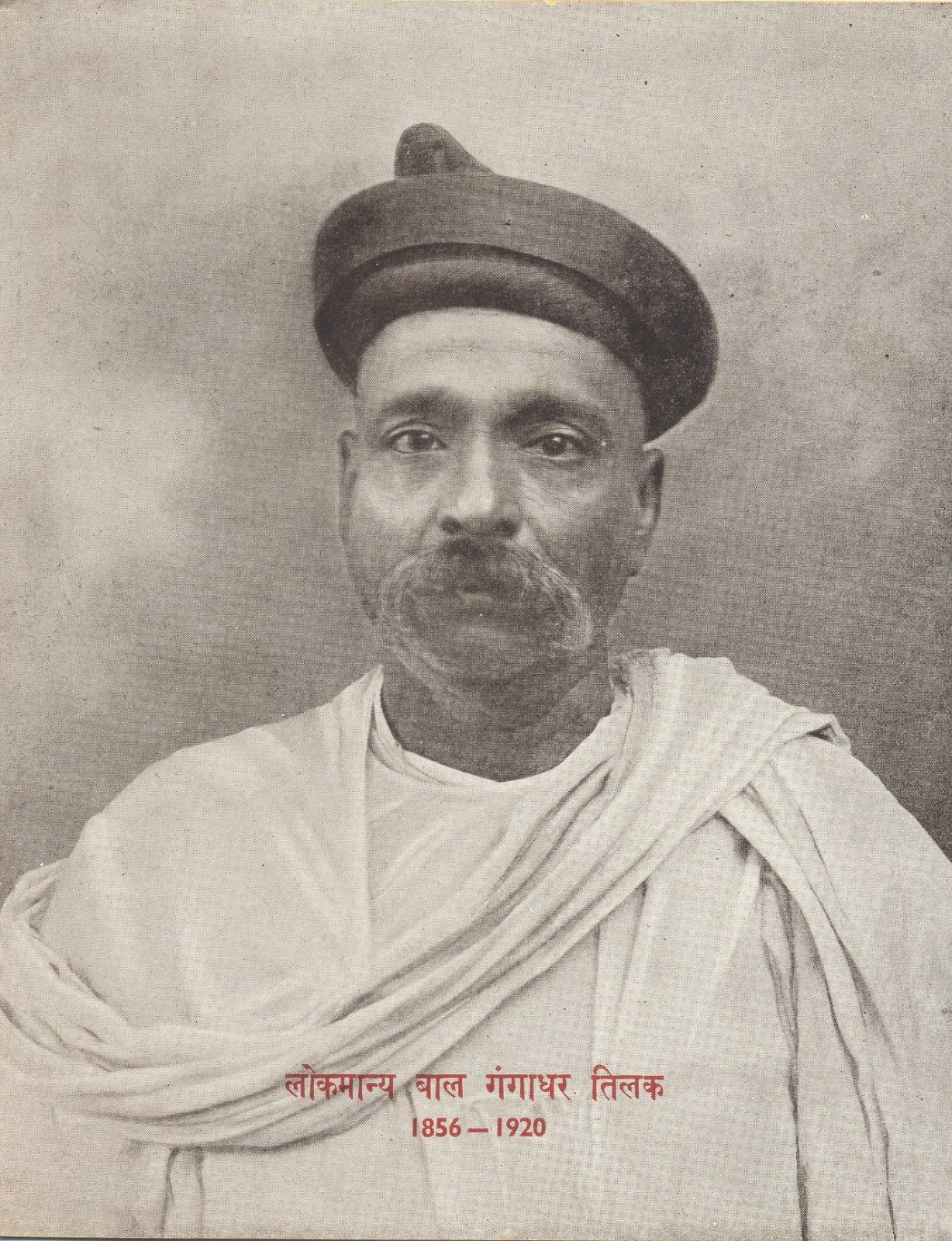
Bal Gangadhar Tilak 1856-1920

The events like the Ganapati festival and Shiv Jayanti were used by Tilak to build a national spirit beyond the circle of the educated elite in opposition to colonial rule. But it also exacerbated Hindu-Muslim differences. The festival organisers would urge Hindus to protect cows and boycott the Muharram celebrations organised by Shi'a Muslims, in which Hindus had formerly often participated. Thus, although the celebrations were meant to be a way to oppose colonial rule, they also contributed to religious tensions. Contemporary Marathi Hindu nationalist parties like the Shiv Sena took up his reverence for Shivaji. However, Indian Historian, Uma Chakravarti cites Professor Gordon Johnson and states "It is significant that even at the time when Tilak was making political use of Shivaji the question of conceding Kshatriya status to him as Maratha was resisted by the conservative Brahmins including Tilak. While Shivaji was a Brave man, all his bravery, it was argued, did not give him the right to a status that very nearly approached that of a Brahmin. Further, the fact that Shivaji worshiped the Brahmanas in no way altered social relations, 'since it was as a Shudra he did it – as a Shudra the servant, if not the slave, of the Brahmin'".

The Deccan Education Society that Tilak founded with others in the 1880s still runs Institutions in Pune like the Fergusson College. The Swadeshi movement started by Tilak at the beginning of the 20th century became part of the Independence movement until that goal was achieved in 1947. One can even say Swadeshi remained part of Indian Government policy until the 1990s when the Congress Government liberalised the economy. Tilak said, "I regard India as my Motherland and my Goddess, the people in India are my kith and kin, and loyal and steadfast work for their political and social emancipation is my highest religion and duty".

He commented:

"He who does what is beneficial to the people of this country, be he a Mohammedan or an Englishman, is not alien. ‘Alienness’ has to do with interests. Alienness is certainly not concerned with white or black skin . . . or religion."

== Books ==
In 1903, Tilak wrote the book The Arctic Home in the Vedas. In it, he argued that the Vedas could only have been composed in the Arctics, and the Aryan bards brought them south after the onset of the last ice age. He proposed a new way to determine the exact time of the Vedas. In The Orion, he tried to calculate the time of the Vedas by using the position of different Nakshatras. The positions of the Nakshtras were described in different Vedas. Tilak wrote Shrimadh Bhagvad Gita Rahasya in prison at Mandalay – the analysis of Karma Yoga in the Bhagavad Gita, which is known to be a gift of the Vedas and the Upanishads.

=== Translation ===
Two books by B.G. Tilak were translated and published in French in 1979 and 1989 :

- The Arctic Home in the Vedas

B.G. Tilak (tr. Claire & Jean Rémy) (1979). Origine Polaire de la Tradition Védique : nouvelles clés pour l'interprétation de nombreux textes et légendes védiques (in French). Éditions Archè. p. 384. ISBN 978-88-7252-096-3..

- The Orion

B.G. Tilak (tr. Claire & Jean Rémy) (1989). Orion. Recherche sur l'antiquité des Védas (in French). Éditions Archè. p. 240. ISBN 978-88-7252-097-0. (This second title was published in French after L'Origine Polaire de la Tradition védique (the translation of Tilak's work The Arctic Home in the Vedas), but is in fact the introduction to it, as confirmed by the original English editions).

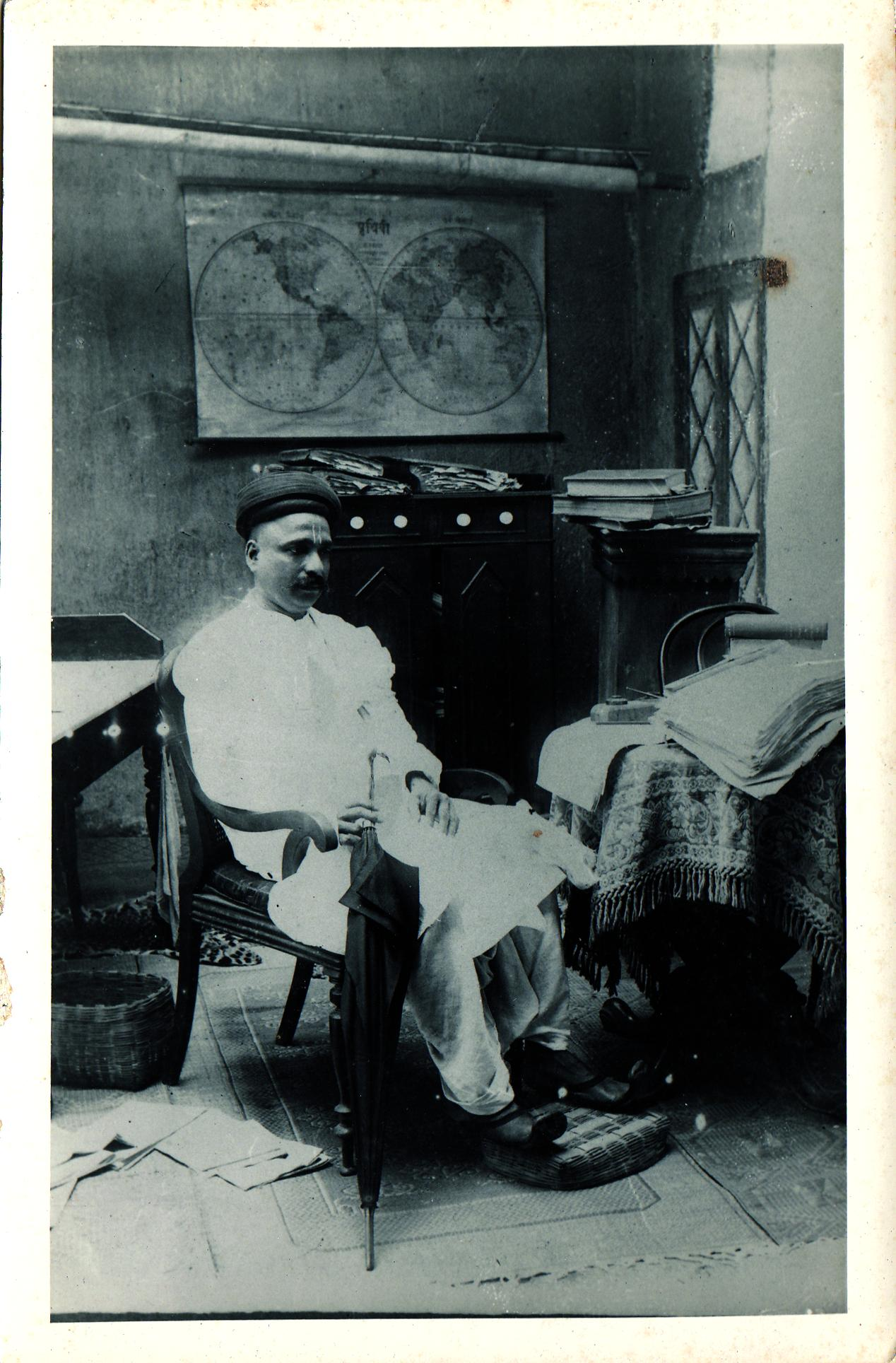
Lokmanya Tilak in his study at Kesari Wada. Photograph undated, but most probably was clicked between 1900-1905.

== Legacy ==
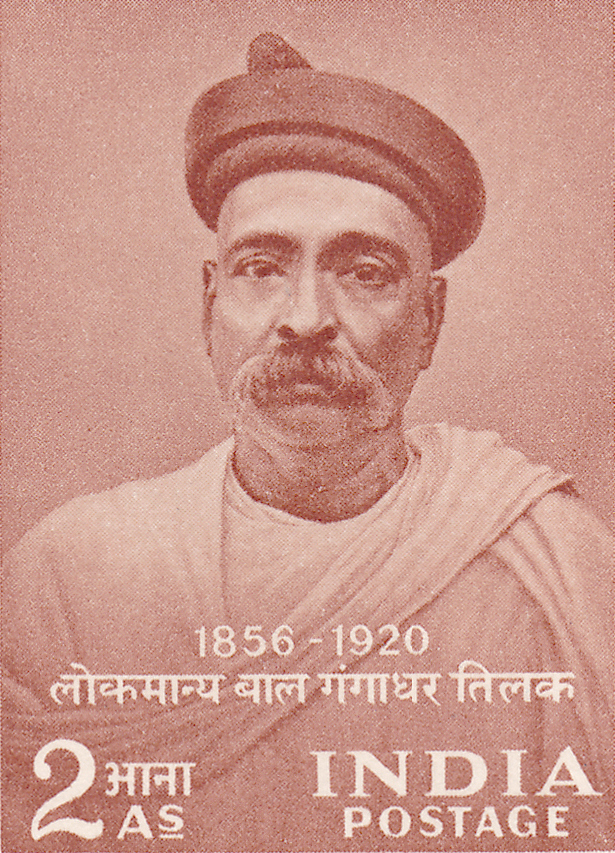
Bal Gangadhar Tilak 1956 stamp of India

On 28 July 1956, a portrait of B. G. Tilak was put in the Central Hall of Parliament House, New Delhi. The portrait of Tilak, painted by Gopal Deuskar, was unveiled by the then Prime Minister of India, Jawaharlal Nehru.

Tilak Smarak Ranga Mandir, a theatre auditorium in Pune is dedicated to him. In 2007, the Government of India released a coin to commemorate the 150th birth anniversary of Tilak. The formal approval of the government of Burma was received for the construction of clafs-cum-lecture hall in the Mandalay prison as a memorial to Lokmanya Tilak. ₹35,000 (US$370) were given by the Indian Government and ₹7,500 (US$80) by the local Indian community in Burma. In 1920, the Lokmanya Tilak Smarak Trust was founded. Between 1995 and 2004, the trust installed several commemorative plaques across Pune under their Pune Aitihasik Vastu Smriti society.

Several Indian films have been made on his life, including: the documentary films Lokmanya Bal Gangadhar Tilak (1951) and Lokmanya Tilak (1957) both by Vishram Bedekar, Lokmanya: Ek Yugpurush (2015) by Om Raut, and The Great Freedom Fighter Lokmanya Bal Gangadhar Tilak – Swaraj My Birthright (2018) by Vinay Dhumale. Lokmanya, a Marathi-language television series about him, aired in India in 2022.

Balmohan Vidyamandir, a prominent secondary school in the neighbourhood of Shivaji Park in Mumbai, is jointly named in honour of Bal Gangadhar Tilak and Mohandas Karamchand Gandhi (Bal-Mohan).

== See also ==
- S. S. Setlur
