= Vaman Shivram Apte =

Indian lexicographer and professor (1858–1892)

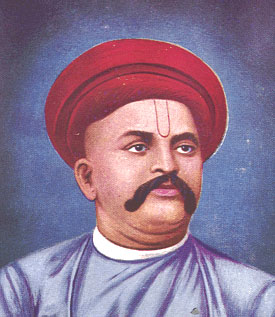
- Born: 1858
- Died: 9 August 1892 (aged 34)
- Occupations: Lexicographer, Professor
- Works: The Student's English-Sanskrit Dictionary
- Movement: Indian Independence Movement

Vaman Shivram Apte (1858 – 9 August 1892) was an Indian lexicographer and a professor of Sanskrit at Pune's Fergusson College.

He is best known for his compilation of a dictionary, The Student's English-Sanskrit Dictionary.

== Works ==
- The Practical Sanskrit-English Dictionary (1890), ISBN 9788120815681

- Sternbach, Ludwik (1960-01-01). "V. S. Apte's the Practical Sanskrit-English Dictionary". Journal of the American Oriental Society. 80 (1): 59–63. doi:10.2307/595270. ISSN 0003-0279. JSTOR 595270.

- The Students' English-Sanskrit Dictionary (1884)
- The Students' Sanskrit-English Dictionary, ISBN 9788120800458
- The Students' Guide to Sanskrit Composition (1881)
- The Students' Hand-Book of Progressive Exercises, Part I and II
- Kusuma-mala (1891)
