= Purushottam Karandak =

Marathi inter-collegiate one-act play competition

- Frequency: Annual
- Locations: Pune, India
- Inaugurated: 1963
- Most recent: 2023
- Organizer: Maharashtriya Kalopasak

The Purushottam Karandak is an annual inter-collegiate Marathi one-act play competition where students from across Maharashtra participate while representing their respective colleges. The inter-collegiate one-act play competition is known for giving a platform to amateur actors, some of whom have become professional actors, directors and playwrights. In the 2023 edition of the event, the primary rounds will take place from 16 August to 30 August.

== History ==
The founding members of Maharashtriya Kalopasak were Purushottam Vaze, Bhagwanrao Pandit, Prabhudas Bhupatkar, Keshavrao Date and Datto Vaman Potdar. The death of the founding member Purushottam Vaze aka Appasaheb in 1962 was a big loss for the theatre fraternity. In his memory Rajabhau Natu, a stalwart of experimental theatre, suggested to organize an inter-collegiate one-act play competition. Thus Purushottam Karandak was started in 1963.

In 2022, the awards were cancelled for the first time in the history of the event due to lack of merit.

== Venue ==
Purushottam Karandak takes place at Bharat Natya Mandir located in Sadashiv Peth, Pune every year.

== Famous participants ==
Some of the actors and directors who were the participants of Purushottam Karandak are

- Pravin Tarde
- Rohini Hattangadi
- Jabbar Patel
- Satish Alekar
- Mohan Agashe
- Mohan Gokhale
- Mohan Joshi
- Sonali Kulkarni
- Mrinal Kulkarni
- Subodh Bhave
- Shivraj Waichal
- Amey Wagh
- Abhay Mahajan
- Siddharth Menon
- Nipun Dharmadhikari
- Alok Rajwade
- Om Bhutkar
- Suvrat Joshi
- Vaibhav Tatwawadi
- Upendra Limaye
- Mrunmayee Deshpande
- Sandeep Deshmukh
