= Premala Conditions Apply =

2026 Indian Marathi web series

- Genre: Romance; Drama
- Written by: Kalyani Pandit
- Directed by: Gaurav Patki
- Creative director: Sandhya Ramashray Gupta
- Starring: Siddharth Menon; Janhavi Uday
- Music by: Suyash Kelkar
- Country of origin: India
- Original language: Marathi
- No. of episodes: 50

Production
- Producer: Sunil Vasant Bhosale
- Cinematography: Vijay Soni
- Editors: Jayant Jathar; Vikkraman; Sharvari
- Camera setup: Multi-camera
- Production company: Creative Mind Productions

Original release
- Network: ZEE5
- Release: 24 June 2026 – present

Premala Conditions Apply is a 2026 Indian Marathi language romantic drama web series directed by Gaurav Patki and produced by Creative Mind Productions. It stars Siddharth Menon and Janhavi Uday as two colleagues who develop a romantic relationship at work. The series premiered on ZEE5 on 24 June 2026.

== Premise ==
The series follows Ananya and Rishi, two colleagues at a corporate firm whose relationship becomes romantic. Their growing attachment puts both their professional standing and personal ambitions under pressure.

== Cast ==
- Siddharth Menon as Rishikesh
- Janhavi Uday as Ananya
- Devika Daftardar as Ananya's Mother
- Chinmayee Sumeet as Rishikesh's Mother
- Ganesh Yadav as Rishikesh's Father
- Kadambari Kadam as Meera
- Amruta Bane as Maithili
- Kapil Redekar as Kabeer

== Production ==
The series was produced by Creative Mind Productions and directed by Gaurav Patki. Siddharth Menon, who plays Rishi, received a National Film Award Special Mention for the Marathi film June (2021). Before moving to screen work, he co-founded the Pune-based theatre company Natak Company.

=== Release ===
Premala Conditions Apply premiered on ZEE5 on 24 June 2026. New episodes are released every Wednesday.

=== Reception ===
Maharashtra Times published a review of the series on its premiere date.
