= Amar Photo Studio =

2016 two-part Marathi play

- Written by: Manaswini Lata Ravindra
- Characters: Apu; Tanu; Old Photographer; V. Shantaram; Keshav Date; Chandrika
- Genre: Scifi

Amar Photo Studio is a two-act Marathi play directed by Nipun Dharmadhikari, featuring Amey Wagh, Sakhi Gokhale, Suvrat Joshi, Pooja Thombre and Siddhesh Purkar. The first show was on August 13, 2016 at Yashwantrao Chavan Natyagruha, Kothrud. It was written by Manaswini Lata Ravindra. The play is produced by Subak, in association with Kalakarkhana. Sakhi Gokhale was replaced by Parna Pethe after the 250th show.

== Conception ==
While shooting for Dil Dosti Duniyadari, the cast wanted to create stories that the audience could relate to hence they came up with the gist for the play and approached the writer of the show, Manaswini, to expand upon it. After eight drafts, the script for Amar Photo Studio was created.

== Plot summary ==
The story revolves around two lovers, Apu and Tanu. Their relationship has become monotonous. Apu is stressed out due to abandonment issues with the father figures, who left the family at 27 and never returned. Now that Apu is 27, he is depressed and has become suicidal. Just as he is about to commit suicide, Tanu comes there and he is saved.

Later, it is discovered that Apu has been offered a scholarship for research abroad. So for clicking photograph for the visa, Apu needs to go. But instead of that, Apu wastes his time around, which chagrines Tanu. The relationship also is in turmoil due to the prospect of the long-distance relationship once Apu is abroad.

Tanu takes him to 'Amar Photo Studio', to click a picture. There they meet an old man who starts telling them philosophies. Thinking that he is a mad man, they want to leave. Just then, the man clicks a picture and they are transported back to the past. The rest of the play explores their interactions with the past. Apu is transported to film shooting in 1942, while Tanu is transported to a cafe in 1976. Apu meets the heroine, Chandrika. Tanu meets a hippy (smoking weed) whom she discovers to be her father. Apu discovers how life is difficult for Chandrika. When they return to the present, they find that they were fighting on petty issues and patch up again.

== Cast and crew ==
=== On-stage cast ===
- Suvrat Joshi as Apu
- Sakhi Gokhale (Parna Pethe after 250 shows) as Tanu
- Amey Wagh as the old Photographer and V. Shantaram
- Pooja Thombre as Chandrika, an actress from 1942 and two other characters
- Siddhesh Purkar as Keshavrao Date and other characters

=== Other crew ===
- Manaswini Lata Ravindra, writer
- Nipun Dharmadhikari, director
- Pradeep Mulye, set design
- Kalyani Kulkarni-Gugle, costume design
- Santosh Gilbile, makeup design
- Gandhar Sangoram, background music
- Akshata Tithe, choreography
- Jasraj Joshi and Sanhita Chandorkar, Vocals

refs :

== Reception ==
In 2018 the play completed its 250 show mark and the performance of the actors has been appreciated by veteran actors like Shubhangi Gokhale. The play has also been well received by audiences in the UK and is the first Marathi play to explore time travel.

== Awards ==
=== Maharashtra State Professional Drama Competition 2017 ===
The play won the second runner-up position. Amey Wagh won the silver medal for best male actor.

Other Prizes
Name	Prize	Position
Nipun Dharmadhikari	Direction	Third
Manaswini Lata Ravindra	Writing	First
Pradeep Mulye	Set Design	Third
Kalyani Kulkarni-Gugle	Costume Design	Second
SANTOSH GILBILE	Make Up	First
