= Pushkaraj Chirputkar =

Indian actor

- Born: 06 September 1986 (age 40); Pune, Maharashtra, India
- Occupations: Actor; host
- Years active: 2013–present
- Known for: Dil Dosti Duniyadari; Dil Dosti Dobara

Pushkaraj Chirputkar is a Marathi actor and host widely known for his role of 'Ashu' on the Marathi sitcom Dil Dosti Duniyadari, as well as for his role in its sequel, Dil Dosti Dobara. Since then he has appeared in Hindi and Marathi movies, and also on webseries.

== Early life ==
He grew up in Akurdi. He went to a convent school, St. Ursula's. His interest in being part of co-curricular activities, rather than classroom education, got him interested in acting. He completed his Engineering in Electronics & Telecommunications from Pimpri Chinchwad College of Engineering, Akurdi, during which he used to do practice and perform plays with local theatre groups. At the time he also dabbled in acting, writing and directing numerous local short films like Forget It at IMDb alongside Amey Wagh and Shruti Marathe as lead actors which later aired on Zee Yuva in 2016. His family was also very interested in Marathi cinema and theatre. He started out by mimicking Dilip Prabhavalkar as a child, after watching him on TV.

== Career ==
Chirputkar became known with the role of the simpleton Ashu (Ashutosh Shivalkar) on the Marathi Sitcom Dil Dosti Duniyadari, which became an instant success. He was also in its reboot sequel, Dil Dosti Dobara. He has also been part of Marathi movies like Baapjanma (2017), Tujha Tu Majha Mi (2017), 1 Te 4 Band (2017) and Mantr (2018). He was seen in the Hindi Movie, Budhiya Singh - Born to Run. He also co-hosted Filmfare Award (Marathi) in 2017, alongside Pushkar Shrotri. He also was the host of Maharshtracha Favorite Dancer in 2018 which aired on Sony Marathi. He also made a cameo appearance in Amazon Prime's Original Show The Family Man (2019). He will be seen in "Medium Spicy" a Marathi film which is scheduled to be released in 2020.

He also played a role in BhaDiPa's sketch comedies Aaplya Baapacha Hatel and Aaplya Baapacha Rasta.

== Filmography ==
=== Films ===
Year	Title	Role	Notes
2011	Aajoba Vayat Ale	Potlya	Debut film
2017	Baapjanma	Mauli	
2017	1 te 4 band	Man	
2017	TTMM – Tujha Tu Majha Mi		
2018	Budhiya Singh - Born to Run	Journalist	
2018	Mantr	Kashinath	
2019	Chidiakhana	Sikka	
2020	Medium Spicy		
2020	Chikatgunde	Sahil	
2020	Gadbad Gondhal	Samay	
2021	Mumbai Diaries 26/11	Samarth Joshi	
2021	Grey		
2022	Me Vasantrao	P. L. Deshpande	Zee Chitra Gaurav Puraskar for Best Supporting Actor
2022	83	Gavaskar's neighbor	
2024	Musafiraa	Amey	
2024	Chandu Champion	Constable 2	
2024	Like Aani Subscribe	Varun	
2025	Ashi Hi Jamva Jamvi	Nitin	
2025	Tu Bol Na	Hrishikesh	
2026	Krantijyoti Vidyalay Marathi Madhyam	Vishal Bhoir	
2026	Tighee	Malhar Karnik	
2026	Bhootam Bhayyam	Balkrushna (Kaka)	
2026	Sammarth	Borgainkar	
2026	Paach Futacha Bachchan	Rajlaxmi's personal assistant	

=== Television ===
Year	Title	Role	Notes
2015-2016	Dil Dosti Duniyadari	Ashutosh (Ashu) Shivalkar	Television debut
2015	Zee Marathi Awards 2015	Host	
2016	Aaplya Baapacha Rasta	Student	Bhadipa's Sketch comedy
2017	Dil Dosti Dobara	Phanindranath (Papya) Rane	
2017	Filmfare Marathi Awards	Host	Alongside Pushkar Shrotri
2017	Aaplya Baapacha Hatel	Pushkaraj (restaurant owner)	Bhadipa's Sketch comedy
2018	Maharashtracha Favourite Dancer	Host	
2019	The Family Man	Bomber	Cameo appearance
2020-2021	Assa Maher Nako Ga Bai!	Kunal	
2022	Band Baja Varat	Host	
2025	Be Dune Teen		
2026	Detective Dhananjay: Rahasyajaal	Chotu	

=== Theatre ===
Year	Name	Notes
2023	Kirkol Navre	

== Environmental activism ==
He was the chief guest at Haritamritam, a green initiative on organic terrace gardening by Amrita Yuva Dharm Dhara(AYUDH).
