= Nipun Dharmadhikari =

Indian director, writer and actor

- Born: Nipun Avinash Dharmadhikari; 1987 (age 38–39)
- Education: Brihan Maharashtra College of Commerce, Pune
- Occupations: actor; writer; director
- Years active: 2003 - present
- Known for: Dhappa; Amar Photo Studio; Casting Couch With Amey & Nipun; Mismatched; Me Vasantrao
- Awards: Nargis Dutt Award for Best Feature Film on National Integration (2018)

Nipun Avinash Dharmadhikari (born in 1987) is a Marathi writer, actor, and director. He is known for the revival of Sangeet Natak (Musicals) and long five act plays.

== Early life and personal life ==
Dharmadhikari's early education was in a convent school. He started learning classical music when he was 8. His first contact with arts came when he did an impromptu performance of the Marathi play, Varhad Nighalay London La in front of his class, in school. The teachers found out and he then began performing for annual days and other public events. He was a student of Brihan Maharashtra College of Commerce, where he was studying to become a chartered accountant. In 2003, Dharmadhikari started acting in plays for Purushottam Karandak, Pune's intercollegiate theatre competition. He has also participated in Zee Karandak.

He is married to singer Sanhita Chandorkar.

== Career ==
He started Natak Company along with Amey Wagh, Parna Pethe and few students from Brihan Maharashtra College of Commerce and Fergusson college in 2008, which produces Marathi plays. His maiden venture was the play Cycle, where he directed Amey Wagh. In 2009, he was seen in the Marathi film, Harishchandrachi Factory. He went on to direct two plays, the first one being Lose Control, which dealt with sexual fantasies of three teenagers; while the second one was Never Mind, starring Spruha Joshi. In 2013, Dharmadhikari also wrote for the Hindi romantic comedy-drama film, Nautanki Saala!.

In 2015, Dharmadhikari was also featured in Forbes India's 30 under 30 list. In the same year, he was also seen in Highway, where he was seen playing a football fan. He was again featured on Forbes Asia's 30 under 30 list in 2016. He hosts the satirical talk show Casting Couch with Amey & Nipun on the YouTube channel, Bharatiya Digital Party, which started the same year. He made his marathi movie directorial debut through Baapjanma(2017). He also went on to direct the national award winning film, Dhappa. He was the guest of honour at Vinodottam Karandak in 2017. He has also directed award winning plays like Sharam Gayi Toh, 36 and Dalan. In 2022, he directed the Marathi play Adlay Ka…?, starring Parna Pethe and Atul Pethe, based on the original work Die Besetzung (The Occupation) by Swiss writer Charles Lewinsky and translated by Shaunak Chandorkar.

== Filmography ==
=== Films ===
Year	Title	Role	Language	Reference
2009	Harishchandrachi Factory	Actor	Marathi	
2013	Nautanki Saala!	Writer	Hindi	
2015	Highway	Actor	Marathi	
2017	Baapjanma	Writer/ Director	Marathi	
2018	Dhappa	Writer/ Director	Marathi	
2018	Karwaan	Actor	Hindi	
2022	Me Vasantrao	Writer/ Director	Marathi	
2024	Ek Don Teen Chaar	Actor/ Writer	Marathi	
2024	Ishq Vishk Rebound	Director	Hindi	
2025	Baai Tujhyapayi	Director	Marathi	
2026	Tighee	Actor	Marathi	

=== Shows ===
Name	Role	Language	Platform	Reference
Side Hero	Writer	Hindi	Eros Now	
Casting Couch With Amey & Nipun	Host	Marathi	YouTube	
Once A Year	Arihant	Marathi	MXPLAYER	
Mismatched S1, S2, S3	Director	Hindi	Netflix	

=== Plays ===
Year of first show	Name	Role	Reference
2012	Never Mind	Director	
2016	Amar Photo Studio	Director	
2016	Sangeet Saunshaykallol	Director	
2017	Stand-Up	Actor	
2018	Once More	Director	
2022	Adlay Ka...?	Director	
2026	Lagna Panchami	Director	
Unknown	Cycle	Director	
Unknown	Sangeet Manapman	Director	
Unknown	Sangeet Saubhadra	Director	
Unknown	Lose Control	Director	

== Awards ==
- Third Position at the Maharashtra State Professional Drama Competition 2017 (Direction), for Amar Photo Studio
- Best Director, Maharashtra Times Sanmaan 2017
- Nargis Dutt Award for Best Feature Film on National Integration in 2018 for Dhappa.
- Best Director, Zee Natya Gaurav Puraskar 2019 for Once More.
