= Pawan & Pooja =

Indian drama web series

- Genre: Relationship drama
- Screenplay by: Agrim Joshi; Debojit Das Purkayastha; Abhishek Chatterjee
- Directed by: Ajay Bhuyan; Shaad Ali
- Starring: Mahesh Manjrekar; Deepti Naval; Sharman Joshi; Gul Panag; Taaruk Raina; Natasha Bharadwaj
- Country of origin: India
- Original language: Hindi
- No. of seasons: 1
- No. of episodes: 10

Production
- Producers: Siddharth Malhotra; Sapna Malhotra
- Production location: India
- Editor: Dharmesh Patel
- Running time: 40 mins
- Production company: Alchemy Films PVT.LTD

Original release
- Network: MX Player
- Release: 14 February 2020

Pawan & Pooja is a relationship-drama web series directed by Ajay Bhuyan and Shaad Ali. The show features Mahesh Manjrekar, Deepti Naval, Sharman Joshi, Gul Panag, Taaruk Raina and Natasha Bharadwaj. The series is available for streaming on MX Player and Season 1 was aired on 14 February 2020.

== Cast ==
=== Main ===
Couple 1

- Mahesh Manjrekar as Pawan Kalra
- Deepti Naval as Pooja Kalra

Couple 2

- Sharman Joshi as Pawan Mehra
- Gul Panag as Pooja Mehra

Couple 3

- Taaruk Raina as Pawan Srivastav
- Natasha Bharadwaj as Pooja Maheshwari

=== Recurring ===
- Mrinal Dutt as Raj
- Geetika Vidya Ohlyan as Mehak

== Release ==
The official trailer of the web series was launched on 5 February 2020, by MX Player on YouTube. Pawan & Pooja was made available for free streaming on MX Player from 14 February 2020.

== Reception ==
Deccan Chronicle wrote about the series in their newspaper, "All three couples have sufficient meat in the plot to chew on, and they make the best of it. The series maintains an emotional equilibrium, never going overboard in its quest of eyeballs. Three pairs of actors take care of the rest."

The Free Press Journal rated it 3 out of 5 and published a review saying, "The series treads an explorative path allowing the couples to exploit their hidden desires, stretching them to the extreme ends of their endurance before bringing them back from the brink. These are trends of love that are believable and immediately relatable. This series is sure to keep you interested and is the most appropriate Valentine's Day watch."
