= Supreme (film) =

2016 Indian Telugu-language action comedy film

- Theatrical release poster
- Directed by: Anil Ravipudi
- Written by: Anil Ravipudi
- Produced by: Dil Raju
- Starring: Sai Dharam Tej; Raashii Khanna
- Cinematography: Sai Sriram
- Edited by: M. R. Varma
- Music by: Sai Karthik
- Production company: Sri Venkateswara Creations
- Release date: 5 May 2016
- Running time: 142 minutes
- Country: India
- Language: Telugu
- Budget: ₹15 crore (Note: ₹15 crore (US$2.23 million))

Supreme is a 2016 Indian Telugu-language action comedy film written and directed by Anil Ravipudi and produced by Dil Raju under his banner Sri Venkateswara Creations . It stars Sai Dharam Tej and Raashii Khanna in the lead roles. The music was composed by Sai Karthik, while the cinematography and editing were handled by Sai Sriram and M. R. Varma.

Production began on 23 September 2015 in Hyderabad and principal photography commenced on 5 October 2015.

Supreme was released on 5 May 2016 and became a commercial success at the box office.

== Cast ==
- Sai Dharam Tej as Balu
- Raashii Khanna as SI Bellam Sridevi
- Mikhail Gandhi as Rajan
- Rajendra Prasad as Nagaraju, Balu's father
- Kabir Duhan Singh as Vikram Sarkar
- Ravi Kishan as Beeku
- P. Sai Kumar as Narayana Rao
- Shiju as Raja Ram, Rajan's father
- Murali Mohan as a judge
- Posani Krishna Murali as Shivayya
- Ali as a doctor
- Vineet Kumar as Patnaik
- Tanikella Bharani as Commissioner T. Bharani
- Vennela Kishore as Constable Kishore
- Jaya Prakash Reddy as MLA
- Raghu Babu as Sridevi's father
- Surekha Vani as Janaki, Sridevi's mother
- Sivannarayana Naripeddi as Sridevi's paternal uncle
- Srinivasa Reddy as Seenayya
- Supreeth as Sarkar's henchman
- Ravi Babu as Nepali Krishna
- Khayyum as Mongolian Tibetian Ali
- Fish Venkat as a police officer
- Prudhvi Raj as Tom
- Prabhas Sreenu as Cruise
- Satyam Rajesh as Rajesh
- Sudigali Sudheer as a cinema director
- Shankar Melkote as an Industrialist
- Raghu Karumanchi as MLA's henchman
- Gundu Sudarshan as a drunkard
- Gautham Raju as Hero
- Sapthagiri as a man in airport
- Ping Pong Surya as Sridevi's brother
- Meena Kumari as Sridevi's sister-in-law
- Rajitha as Sridevi's paternal aunt
- Sravan as a police officer
- Raghava as Constable Raghava
- Giridhar as Venkatesh
- Thotapalli Madhu as M.P.
- Haribabu as Hari
- Shaking Seshu as Janni
- Mahesh Achanta as spectacle seller
- Gemini Suresh

=== Cameo appearance ===
- Shruti Sodhi in the song "Taxi Vaala"
- Anil Ravipudi in end credits
- Dil Raju in end credits

== Soundtrack ==
Supreme

Soundtrack album by Sai Karthik
- Released: 14 April 2016
- Recorded: 2016
- Genre: Soundtrack
- Length: 18:21
- Label: Aditya Music
- Producer: Sai Karthik

Sai Karthik chronology
Eedo Rakam Aado Rakam (2016)	Supreme (2016)	Selfie Raja (2016)

The music was composed by Sai Karthik and Raj–Koti, with one song remixed from Yamudiki Mogudu. Music was released on Aditya Music Company. Audio was launched on 14 April 2015, held at Hyderabad.

No.	Title	Lyrics	Singer(s)	Length
1.	"Taxi Vaala"	Kasarla Shyam	Jaspreet Jasz, Divija Kartheek	3:03
2.	"Anjaneyudu Neevadu"	Ramajogayya Sastry	Karthik, Sooraj Santhosh, Deepthi Parthasarathy	4:14
3.	"Bellam Sridevi"	Ramajogayya Sastry	Sai Charan	4:07
4.	"Chalo Chalo"	Ramajogayya Sastry	Krishna Chaithanya	2:32
5.	"Andam Hindolam (Remix)"	Veturi	Chitra, L. V. Revanth	4:23
Total length:				18:21

== Release ==
The film was released on 5 May 2016.

=== Dubbed versions ===
It was dubbed in Malayalam and Bhojpuri with same title, while the Hindi version was titled as Supreme Khiladi and Kannada version as Superior.
