= Abhay Mahajan =

Indian actor

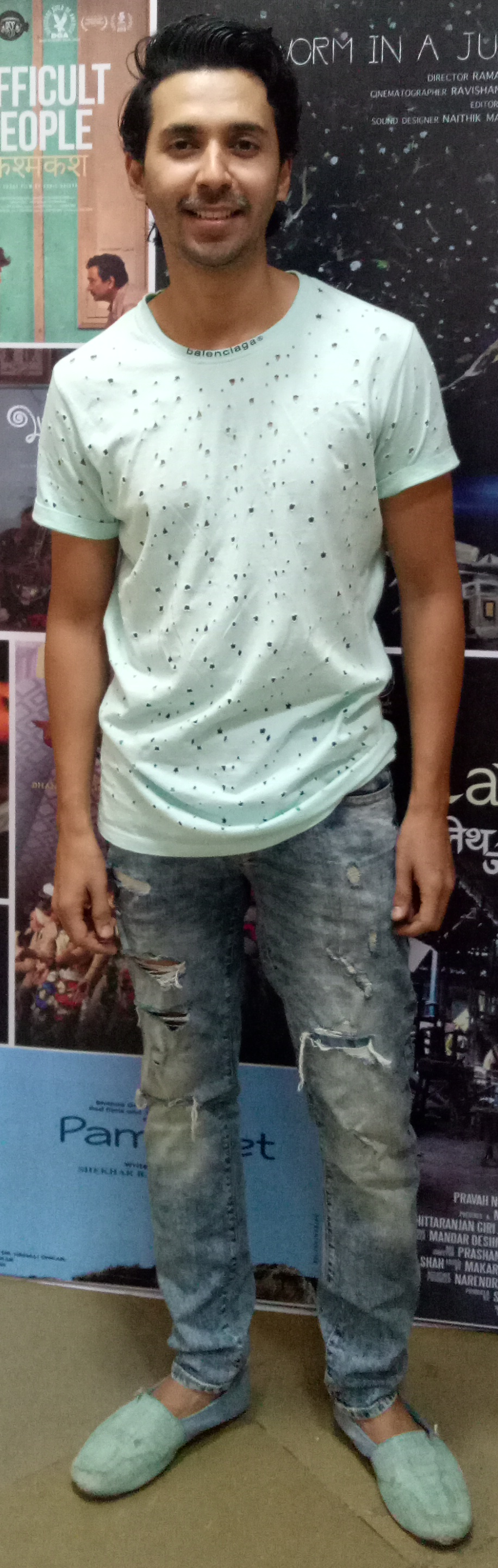
- Abhay Mahajan at the National Film Archive of India in 2019
- Born: Pune
- Education: Brihan Maharashtra College of Commerce, Pune University
- Occupation: actor
- Years active: 2008 – Present
- Known for: TVF Pitchers

Abhay Mahajan is an Indian actor known for his work in TVF drama series - Pitchers.

== Life and career ==
Mahajan completed his schooling from Abhinava Vidyalaya and graduated from Brihan Maharashtra College of Commerce. He started his career working as a child actor. He moved to Mumbai from Pune in 2015. Mahajan learnt body movement for a year at the Attakkalari Institute of Movement Arts (Bengaluru) and also conducts body movements workshop. He is also one of the founding members of the Pune-based theatre troupe, Natak Company. Mahajan has been active in theatre and has been part of many award-winning and acclaimed films. In 2018, he was part of Bharatiya Digital Party's Harry Potter spoof video, titled If Hogwarts was a Marathi School, where he played Hari Potdar.

== Filmography ==
=== Films ===
Year	Work	Notes
2007	Doha	
2008	Harishchandrachi Factory	
2009	Who Let The Dogs Out?	As a director
2011	Don Shoor	
2014	Institute of Pavtology	
2014	Dekh Tamasha Dekh	as Anwar
2016	Rangaa Patangaa	
2016	CRD	
2017	Khamosh Adalat Jaari Hai	
2017	Take Care Good Night	
2017	Kahani Mitra Ki	
2017	Ringan	
2017	Gachchi	
2018	Ashleel Udyog Mitra Mandal	
2018	If Hogwarts was a Marathi School	
2019	Luckee	
2024	Sakshee	

=== Web series ===
Year	Title	Role	Platform	Notes
2015	Pitchers	Saurabh Mandal	YouTube	
2019	Hutatma		ZEE5	
2021	Shantit Kranti	Shreyas	SonyLiv	
2022	TVF Pitchers	Saurabh Mandal	Zee5	
2019	Ishq Next Door	Dev	JioCinema	
2024	Oops Ab Kya?	Omkar	JioHotstar	

=== Plays ===
Title	Ref
Dalan	
Binkamache Sanwad	
Cycle	
Natak Nako	
Chakra	
