= Bokya Satbande =

- Poster
- Directed by: Raj Pendurkar
- Produced by: Kanchan Satpute
- Release date: 17 April 2009
- Country: India
- Language: Marathi

Bokya Satbande is a 2009 Marathi film directed by Raj Pendurkar and produced by Kanchan Satpute of Checkmate fame. The film is based on the book series of the same name written by Dilip Prabhavalkar. The film chronicles the adventures of a young ten-year-old boy called Bokya.

Bokya is played by Aryan Narvekar, son of actor Sanjay Narvekar. The music is composed by Shailendra Barve who has also composed music for Taare Zameen Par and lyrics are written by Jitendra Joshi. The songs are sung by Avadhoot Gupte and Suresh Wadkar.

== Cast ==
- Aryan Narvekar as Bokya/Chinmayanand Satbande
- Dilip Prabhawalkar as Mr. Belwande
- Jyoti Subhash as Indira Satbande (Bokya's grandmother)
- Vijay Kenkre as Pradeep Satbande (Bokya's father)
- Shubhangi Gokhale as Vaishali Satbande (Bokya's mother)
- Chitra Navathe
- Madhavi Juvekar as maid
- Alok Rajwade as Vijay Satbande (Bokya's elder brother)
- Nisha Satpute
- Anjali Bhagwat in guest appearance

== Music ==
The songs featured in the film are as enlisted below.

- "Bokya Satbande" – Singer: Avdhoot Gupte
- "Man Aakashache" – Singer: Suresh Wadkar
- "Thodi Style Pahije" -Singer: Avdhoot Gupte
