= His Storyy =

Indian web series

- Genre: Drama; Romantic
- Written by: Suparn Verma; Ritu Bhatia
- Directed by: Prashant Bhagia
- Starring: Satyadeep Misra; Priyamani; Mrinal Dutt
- Country of origin: India
- Original language: Hindi
- No. of seasons: 1
- No. of episodes: 11 (list of episodes)

Production
- Producers: Ekta Kapoor; Shobha Kapoor
- Production location: India
- Cinematography: Srinivas Achary
- Camera setup: Multi-camera
- Running time: 24 minutes
- Production company: Ding Entertainment

Original release
- Network: ZEE5, ALTBalaji
- Release: 25 April 2021

His Storyy (alternatively titled His Story) is an Indian, Hindi-language romantic drama web series directed by Prashant Bhagia. It is an ALTBalaji and ZEE5 original, released on 25 April 2021. It stars Satyadeep Mishra, Priyamani Raj, and Mrinal Dutt in the lead roles. The series was produced by Tanveer Bookwala and Ding Entertainment, and was written by Suparn Verma and Ritu Bhatia. The series revolves around the life of Sakshi, Kunal and his lover Preet and the social issue of acceptance of homosexuals by the society and family.

== Plot ==
Sakshi and Kunal are a South-Bombay power couple who are running a business together. Sakshi is the head chef and Kunal takes care of the business end of the restaurant. They have two children, Shlok and Shivaay. Things fall apart for Sakshi when she realizes that her 20 years of familial and marital bliss was nothing but a pack of lies. Kunal has an extra-marital affair with a man called Preet and this destroys Sakshi. The couple decide to separate and end the marriage. Kunal moves in with Preet; but the family, especially his eldest son Shivaay, doesn't take this very well. He is homophobic and abuses his father as well his friend Ved, who is discovering his sexuality in his adolescence. Shlok and Sakshi accept the truth and decide to move on. But due to various events that occur, the story does not have a happy ending.

== Cast ==
The prime cast of the show is:

- Satyadeep Mishra as Kunal
- Priyamani as Sakshi
- Mrinal Dutt as Preet
- Nitin Bhatia as Shivaay, elder son of Kunal and Sakshi
- Mikhail Gandhi as Shlok, younger son of Kunal and Sakshi
- Charu Shankar as Rafia
- Rheanne Tejani as Jhanvi, daughter of Rafia
- Rajeev Kumar as Nihal
- Parinitaa Seth as Loveleen, Nihal's wife
- Anmol Kajani as Ved, son of Nihal and Loveleen
- Shruthy Menon as Rati, works with Sakshi
- Soundarya Sharma as Rashmi

== Episodes ==
No. overall	No. in season	Title	Directed by	Written by	Original release date
1	1	"Marriage is a Racket"	Prashant Bhagia	Suparn Verma, Ritu Bhatia	25 April 2021
Sakshi and Kunal are hosting the launch party of their third hotel "Saffron" and all their friends have gathered for the big day. Preet, a food connoisseur and critic, is the chief guest of the event, who has been invited by Sakshi. The launch night becomes dramatic when Sonakshi questions Sheena about having an affair with her husband Rahul. But Preet's presence is a bigger problem for Kunal.
2	2	"Yeh Dil, Kyun Na Keh Saka"	Prashant Bhagia	Suparn Verma, Ritu Bhatia	25 April 2021
Jhanvi's sex tape goes viral and her school suspends her, while her mother Rafia supports her. The girl gang is discussing the nuances of marriage at the gym. Sakshi realizes that she needs to bring back the lost spice in her marriage with Kunal. She cancels the work plans and goes home, only to find the home empty. She goes looking for him and comes very close to finding his dark secrets.
3	3	"Hidden Dreams"	Prashant Bhagia	Suparn Verma, Ritu Bhatia	25 April 2021
Sakshi is embarrassed with her gaff at Preet's house and decides to host a game night for her friends, and also invites Preet. Sakshi and Preet bond over a discussion about their respective partners, unaware of the reality. Rafia sees something that might put Kunal and Sakshi's relationship in jeopardy.
4	4	"It All Comes Crumbling Down"	Prashant Bhagia	Suparn Verma, Ritu Bhatia	25 April 2021
Families gather for a pool party and Jhanvi confronts Shivaay on his homophobia. Saskhi calls him out on the same when they are coming back home. It's ladies night at Saffron hotel. Jhanvi organizes open mic where Ved and Jhanvi give stellar performances. Sakshi happens to step out and follow Kunal to find something that would shake her to the core.
5	5	"History"	Prashant Bhagia	Suparn Verma, Ritu Bhatia	25 April 2021
Kids have a big blow out at school and the parents are called in as Ved has hit ball on Shivaay's face during cricket practice match. Sakshi is in denial about what she saw the previous night, but still meets Preet for a conversation. Preet realizes that Sakshi knows the hidden secret. The bigger conversation happens when she goes home to confront Kunal and he confesses.
6	6	"Pretense and Lies"	Prashant Bhagia	Suparn Verma, Ritu Bhatia	25 April 2021
Sakshi starts coming to terms with Kunal's reality. Nihal and Loveleen celebrate their 20th anniversary in grandeur. Kunal and Sakshi raise toasts to their marriage; but Sakshi announces her big decision of separating from Kunal.
7	7	"Of Rumors and Endings"	Prashant Bhagia	Suparn Verma, Ritu Bhatia	25 April 2021
Sakshi meets Preet and they have a heated argument which Nihal oversees. Shivay and Ved have another tussle where Shivay abuses and claims Ved to be gay. The school calls in their parents again. Nihal is close to living his nightmares after suspecting his son Ved to be gay. Preet and Kunal take a step forward out of no choice. Nihal assumes and tells everyone about Sakshi's new relationship.
8	8	"Out of the Closet"	Prashant Bhagia	Suparn Verma, Ritu Bhatia	25 April 2021
Sakshi confronts Nihal while she is angry. Loveleen apologizes on his behalf. Kunal confronts Nihal on being a bigot and storms off. Nihal finds out the truth about Kunal and Preet as he follows Kunal. Shivay finds the truth before Sakshi could explain both the kids.
9	9	"Love is Love"	Prashant Bhagia	Suparn Verma, Ritu Bhatia	25 April 2021
Shivay is frustrated with his father's secret and acts aggressively at a football match for which he is thrown out of the school team. He then runs away from home, while Ved has to deal with his father's pressure of "being a man". Kunal reaches out to his son but nothing works out. It's only when Shlok steps in, entire family and Sakshi are able to reconcile with the fact of Kunal's identity.
10	10	"A New Beginning"	Prashant Bhagia	Suparn Verma, Ritu Bhatia	25 April 2021
Finally, free from her marriage Sakshi, has a girl's night to move on and meets a possible date. Rafia organizes a party with their entire circle so Kunal could get a glimpse of his whole family. Kunal and Shivaay bond again in the party and Kunal feels happy about it for getting his son's acceptance. This lovely evening is ruined by people with lathis who came to teach Preet a lesson and injure him badly on the streets.
11	11	"Happily Never After"	Prashant Bhagia	Suparn Verma, Ritu Bhatia	25 April 2021
Kunal is heartbroken at the hospital seeing his love being hated upon. Preet and Sakshi try to hide the identity of the assaulter. Jhanvi teaches Shivay about consequences. Sakshi decides to throw a party to commemorate Kunal and Preet's love. There is no happy ending in this story though.

== Soundtrack ==
The series has an original soundtrack consisting of 5 songs. In their review of the series, Amar Ujala appreciated the work of music directors Kartik Shah, Abhiruchi Chand and Abhishek Arora for their original scores and of playback singer Sukanya Purkayasth for her rendering of song "Naina Kahe Bhar Aaye".

No.	Title	Lyrics	Music	Singer(s)	Length
1.	"Yeh Dil"	Kartik Shah	Kartik Shah	Savera Mehta
2.	"Naina Kahe Bhar Aaye"	Abhiruchi Chand	Abhishek Arora	Sukanya Purkayasth
3.	"Axele"		Samar Jyoti Boram	Samar Jyoti Boram
4.	"Aasaan Se"		Samar Jyoti Boram	Samar Jyoti Boram
5.	"Tu Jaisa Bhi Hai"		Samar Jyoti Boram	Samar Jyoti Boram

== Release and reception ==
On 9 April 2021, the promo video and poster of the series were released. However, the released poster that showed Mishra and Dutt spooning, was criticized for similarities with the poster of 2015 film Loev directed by Sudhanshu Saria. Saria, film director Vikramaditya Motwane and various others criticized AltBalaji over various social networking platforms. AltBalaji issued an apology on 11 April and pulled down the poster.

The series was released on 25 April 2021 on the digital platforms of ALTBalaji and Zee5. It was reported by Bollywood Hungama that the end of the story, which would have shown the wedding of the lead gay characters, was changed by the creators given the prevailing social discrimination against the LGBTQIA+ community in India. It also informed that second season of the series may or may not happen depending on the change in prejudiced atmosphere towards the community in the real society. Various intimate scenes shot between Mishra and Dutt were also edited out by creators as self-censorship to avoid getting into troubles, except for few discreet kissing scenes.

Subhash Jha from SpotboyE rates this web series at 3/5. In his own words, "No matter how you look at it His Storyy is a game-changer for same-sex celluloid stories in India. It shows its layered characters, played with rock-star assurance by the cast that knows its job, making some tough choices in life and standing by them. For this alone His Storyy must be seen at your earliest." The Times of India rates His Story at 3/5. "‘His Story’ is a decent attempt at starting a dialogue on eradicating homophobia that still—sadly—exists in our country. Honest performances make this LGBTQIA-centric drama a delightful watch." Amar Ujala gives 2/5 and criticizes the series for being a typical Ekta Kapoor series and is unable to be part of the real world. The setting and the weak dialogues have been criticized which do not enable to the lead actors to perform up to their mark. Roles of supporting actors played by Charu Shankar, Rheanne Tejani and Mikhail Gandhi have been appreciated.
