= Bhootam Bhayyam =

2026 Indian Marathi-language film

- Theatrical release poster
- Directed by: Ramchandra Gaonkar
- Written by: Ramchandra Gaonkar
- Produced by: Naren Kumar; Mahesh Korade
- Starring: Chhaya Kadam; Karan Sonawane; Neel Salekar; Saurabh Ghadge; Siddhant Sarfare; Shubham Jadhav; Pushkaraj Chirputkar; Manmeet Pem
- Cinematography: Pushkar Zoting
- Edited by: Pranav Gandhe
- Music by: Shreenath Mhatre; Sameer Saptiskar
- Production companies: Zee Studios; Kyra Kumar Kreations
- Distributed by: Zee Studios
- Release date: 24 July 2026
- Running time: 164 minutes
- Country: India
- Language: Marathi

Bhootam Bhayyam (transl. Ghosts and Fear) is a 2026 Indian Marathi-language horror comedy film written and directed by Ramchandra Gaonkar in his directorial debut and produced by Naren Kumar and Mahesh Dnyandeo Korade under Kyra Kumar Kreations. The film features an ensemble cast including Chhaya Kadam, Karan Sonawane, Neel Salekar, Saurabh Ghadge, Siddhant Sarfare, Shubham Jadhav, Pushkaraj Chirputkar and Manmeet Pem, several of whom are social media content creators making their feature debuts.

The film follows seven unemployed friends who find an ancient coin capable of producing gold and, in exploiting it for quick money, awaken a centuries-old curse. It was released theatrically on 24 July 2026.

== Plot ==
Seven unemployed friends move into Raniwada, an abandoned mansion with an unsettling history, where they come upon an ancient coin known as the parees. Discovering that it can be used to generate money, they begin exploiting it despite warnings from an elderly man, Bhaskar Purushottam, that doing so will have grave consequences; their greed overrides his advice.

When one of the group member, Gaja, goes missing, Bhaskar returns to tell the remaining six the coin's history. It had belonged to a queen and could turn any object to gold, but was stolen centuries earlier by a young man. The theft cost the coin its power, which could be restored only if the thief's blood touched it, and the queen, bound by a vow to protect the thief, could not act. In the present, Jathai recognizes the coin and seeks to kill Gaja, the thief reborn, to restore its power. Gaja escapes her once but is recaptured, and the friends must free him and put an end to their own greed.

== Cast ==
- Chhaya Kadam as Jathai
- Karan Sonawane as Gaja
- Manmeet Pem as Prikshit, alias Exam
- Pushkaraj Chirputkar as Balkrushna, alias Kaka
- Neel Salekar as Narhari, alias Reel
- Shubham Jadhav as Tanhaji, alias Pampi
- Saurabh Ghadge as Ravindra Modak
- Siddhant Sarfare as Tanmay
- Priyadarshan Jadhav as Maya
- Pratap Phad as Monty
- Sobita Kudtarkar as Sarojini
- Kishor Chaughule as Sachin Jadhav
- Suhita Thatte as Gaja's mother
- Ninad Limaye as Bhaskar Purushottam
- Abhay Khadapkar as Babu Kaka
- Rohan Surve as Dinkar

== Production ==
Bhootam Bhayyam marked the feature-film debut of Ramchandra Gaonkar, who wrote the story, screenplay and dialogue in addition to directing the film. Gaonkar said the team had worked on the project for around two years with the aim of creating a distinctive theatrical experience, describing it as a youthful production led by a new generation of Marathi filmmakers.

The film brought together several social media performers collectively known as the "Orange Juice Gang", including Karan Sonawane, Neel Salekar and Saurabh Ghadge, for their first appearance together on the big screen.

According to the cast, the deserted locations used for filming were sufficiently eerie that they avoided moving around them alone even after shooting had ended. Chhaya Kadam's role as Jathai required extensive prosthetic makeup by Jitendra Mhatre, which took around three and a half hours to apply each day and left her with limited mobility while in costume. The character's first look, released in July 2026, attracted considerable attention in the Marathi press, with several outlets noting that Kadam was almost unrecognizable in the role. Priyadarshan Jadhav said he accepted the role of Maya, an enigmatic character, after hearing the script.

== Music ==
The songs were composed by Shreenath Mhatre and Sameer Saptiskar, while Mhatre also composed the background score; the music was released under the K2K Muzic label.

Tracklisting
No.	Title	Lyrics	Music	Singer(s)	Length
1.	"Bhootam Bhayyam - Title Track"	Prajakt Deshmukh	Shreenath Mhatre	Shreenath Mhatre	4:04
2.	"Sarojini"	Prajakt Deshmukh	hreenath Mhatre	Jasraj Jayant Joshi, Shreenath Mhatre	2:45
3.	"Gomu Saasarla Jaate"	Abhishek Khankar	Samir Saptiskar	Anand Shinde, Samir Saptiskar	2:34
4.	"Paishacha Paus Rap"	Shreyas Sagvekar, Shreenath Mhatre	Shreenath Mhatre	Shreyas Sagvekar, Shreenath Mhatre	2:16
5.	"Happy New Year"	Shreenath Mhatre, Khanderao	Shreenath Mhatre	Mika Singh	3:22
Total length:					15:01

== Release ==
A first look was released in May 2026, followed by the teaser in June and the theatrical trailer in July, the last launched at a horror-themed set. Ahead of the release, the Orange Juice Gang held an exclusive fan screening, announced via social media, which drew several thousand registrations.

Ahead of and following the release, Zee Entertainment Enterprises approached the Madras High Court seeking to prevent copyright infringement, including unauthorized online distribution and cable television recording of the film. Justice K. Kumaresh Babu granted a four-week temporary injunction against the named internet service providers and cable operators, subject to Zee furnishing an indemnity. Bhootam Bhayyam was released in cinemas on 24 July 2026, distributed by Zee Studios.

== Reception ==
=== Critical response ===
Anub George of The Times of India rated the film 2 out of 5, calling it "a well-executed, poorly thought, nearly three-hour ordeal", and criticised its weak comedy, lack of scares, derivative screenplay, excessive gore and prolonged runtime, while praising the art direction and songs. Kalpeshraj Kubal of Maharashtra Times rated the film 2.5 out of 5, criticizing its screenplay and abrupt shift to the supernatural, while praising the cinematography, editing, visual effects, production design and performances of Chhaya Kadam and Priyadarshan Jadhav.

=== Box office ===
Bhootam Bhayyam opened to an estimated ₹22 lakh (US$23,000) net in India, which Koimoi reported as the seventh-highest opening for a Marathi film in 2026. Collections improved across the opening weekend, reaching a cumulative ₹1.48 crore (US$150,000) net by the third day, and the film closed its first week at approximately ₹2.14 crore (US$220,000) net. Business fell sharply thereafter, with the second week declining by around 62 per cent to some ₹82 lakh (US$85,000), bringing the India net total to roughly ₹2.96 crore (US$310,000) by the end of the second week.

Against a reported budget of ₹4 crore (US$420,000), Koimoi characterized the film as a commercial failure while noting that it ranked among the ten highest-grossing Marathi films released in 2026. By the end of its third week, the film had grossed ₹3.67 crore (US$380,000) worldwide.
