= Siddharth Menon (actor) =

Indian actor

- Born: 19 May 1989 (age 37); Pune, Maharashtra, India
- Occupation: Actor
- Notable work: Peddlers (2012); Loev (2015); Rajwade and Sons (2015); Aladdin (2018)
- Spouse: Poornima Nair (m. 2016)

Siddharth Menon (born 19 May 1989) is an Indian actor known for his work in film, television and theatre . He is best known for his roles in the films Loev (2015), Rajwade and Sons (2015) and Karwaan (2018) and the film June (2021) for which he won a National Film Award and Nominated for Maharashtra State Film Award for Best Actor.

== Early life ==
Menon was born to Malayali parents. He was brought up in Pune. He was a student of Gurukul School in Bhosalenagar. He graduated from Brihan Maharashtra College of Commerce in 2010, with a Bachelor of Commerce degree. He initially worked with a group called Askata, before starting Natak Company. He is fluent in Malayalam, Hindi, Marathi, and English; He can understand Tamil.

== Personal life ==
He studied in the Gurukul School in Bhoslenagar, Pune. His love for acting began when his parents took him to the movies as a child. He is of Malayali origin. He married Poornima Nair on 3 February 2016 in Kerala.

== Career ==
He was one of the founding members of the Pune-based theatre troupe, Natak Company, in 2008. He started out in theatre and eventually rose to fame through the crime-thriller, Peddlers (2012). He was also seen in Junglenama, a play directed by Sarang Sathaye. He made his Marathi debut through Ekulti Ek (2012). In 2015, he was in a movie called Loev. He also had a stint as a celebrity radio jockey. In 2018, he has played the titular character during the Indian run of the Broadway musical Aladdin, for which he had to undergo physical training. The actor is currently based in Mumbai. He can also do Calisthenics. He was also seen playing Saket in A Doubtful Gaze at Uber at Midnight, a play which was staged at Serendipity Arts Festival 2018, in Goa. It was directed by Alok Rajwade. He was awarded the National Film Award Special Mention for his performance in the film June (2021) at the 68th National Film Awards.

== Media image ==
Most Desirable Men of Maharashtra
Sponsor	Year	Rank	
Sponsor	Year	Film	Ref.
The Times of India, Maharashtra Times	2017	9	
The Times of India, Maharashtra Times	2018	19	
The Times of India, Maharashtra Times	2019	12	
The Times of India, Maharashtra Times	2020	15	

== Filmography ==
Year	Title	Role	Language	Notes
2009	Geli Ekvis Warsha		Marathi	Play
2009	Tidha		Marathi	Play
2010	Institute of Pavtology		Marathi	Play
2012	Peddlers	Mandar	Hindi	
2012	Ekulti Ek		Marathi	
2012	Never Mind		Marathi	Play
2013	Popat	Balya	Marathi	
2014	Happy Journey	Ajinkya	Marathi	
2015	Loev	Alex	Hinglish	
2015	Rajwade and Sons	Virajas Vaibhav Joshi	Marathi	
2015	Slambook	Hruday	Marathi	
2016	Poshter Girl	Arjun Kalal	Marathi	
2016	& Jara Hatke	Nishant	Marathi	
2017	Qarib Qarib Singlle	Ashish	Hindi	
2018	Karwaan	Groom	Hindi	Cameo appearance
2018	Aladdin	Aladdin	English	Play
2018	A Doubtful Gaze at Uber at Midnight	Saket	English	Play
2019	Welcome Home		Marathi	To be released in June
2019	Made In Heaven	John Mathews	Hindi	
2019	Chappad Phaad Ke	Shubham Gupchup	Hindi	Streaming on Hotstar
2020	Betaal	Nadir Haq	Hindi	Streaming on Netflix
2021	June	Neel	Marathi	National Film Award - Special Mention
2023	Made in Heaven	John Mathews	Hindi	Season 2
2024	Dange	Kabir	Hindi	
2024	Por	Akilan	Tamil	
2025	Dashavtar	Madhav Mestry	Marathi	
2025	Tu Bol Na	Anna	Marathi	
2026	Premala Conditions Apply	Rishi	Marathi	
2026	Manjar	Jayesh	Marathi	
