= Natasha Bharadwaj =

Indian actress

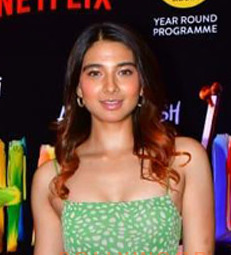
- Bharadwaj in 2024
- Born: 17 September 1999 (age 27)
- Education: Jai Hind College, Mumbai
- Occupation: Actress
- Years active: 2018–present
- Title: Miss Diva 2016 (Finalist); Miss Diva 2016 (Miss Talented)

Natasha Bharadwaj (born 17 September 1999) is an Indian actress who primarily works in Hindi web shows.

== Early life and career ==
Bharadwaj was born and brought up in Mumbai on 17 September 1999. She completed her graduation from Jai Hind College, Mumbai. Bharadwaj participated in Miss Diva 2016, where she became one of the finalists and won the title "Yamaha Fascino Miss Talented".

Bharadwaj started her career as a contestant on the reality show India's Next Superstars (2018), where she emerged as the winner. She then made her acting debut with the web series Pawan & Pooja (2020). Bharadwaj is best known for her role in the series Mumbai Diaries 26/11 (2021). In 2023, she played the role of Meher Kaur Sikka in the web series Ishq Next Door.

== Filmography ==
=== Television ===
Year	Title	Role	Notes	Ref.
2018	India's Next Superstars	Contestant	Winner	

=== Web series ===
Year	Title	Role	Notes	Ref.
2020	Pawan & Pooja	Pooja Maheshwari		
2021–2023	Mumbai Diaries 26/11	Dr. Diya Parekh		
2023	Ishq Next Door	Meher Kaur Sikka		

=== Films ===
Year	Title	Role
2026	O'Romeo	Nargis

=== Music videos ===
Year	Title	Singer	Ref.
2022	Maan Meri Jaan	King	
2025	Kokaina	Badshah	

== Awards and nominations ==
Year	Award	Category	Work	Result	Ref.
2022	Indian Television Academy Awards	Best Supporting Actress – Drama (OTT)	Mumbai Diaries 26/11	Won	
