= Aadi Anant =

2026 Marathi-language film directed by Mahesh Limaye

- Directed by: Mahesh Limaye
- Written by: Sankarshan Karhade
- Produced by: Kumar Mangat Pathak; Abhishek Pathak; Murlidhar Chhatwani; Sameer Hampi; Mahesh Limaye; Aniket Marathe
- Starring: Ashok Saraf; Sankarshan Karhade; Sakhi Gokhale
- Cinematography: Mahesh Limaye; Tanmay Vanmali
- Edited by: Rushiraj Joshi
- Music by: Avinash-Vishwajeet
- Production companies: Panorama Studios; 3H Enterprises; Lee Pictures
- Distributed by: Panorama Studios
- Release date: 12 November 2026
- Running time: 142 minutes
- Country: India
- Language: Marathi

Aadi Anant is a 2026 Indian Marathi-language family drama film directed by Mahesh Limaye and written by Sankarshan Karhade. Presented by Panorama Studios, it is produced by Kumar Mangat Pathak, Abhishek Pathak, Murlidhar Chhatwani, Sameer Hampi, Mahesh Limaye and Aniket Marathe. The film stars Ashok Saraf and Karhade as a grandfather and grandson, alongside Sakhi Gokhale, who appears in a pivotal role.

The film follows a struggling actor in Pune whose ambitions are tested when he must care for his ailing grandfather. It was released theatrically on 12 November 2026 and was selected for the Indian Panorama section of the 57th International Film Festival of India. Upon release the film received generally positive reviews, with critics praising its performances, writing, music and cinematography, while noting issues with its pacing.

== Plot ==
Aadi is a struggling actor living in Pune with his grandfather, Anant, a retired postmaster who dotes on him. Anant often turns up at Aadi's workplaces carrying his favourite meal of varan bhaat, much to his grandson's embarrassment. The pair meet Gayatri Deshmukh, a social worker with a family connection to Anant, and she and Aadi gradually fall in love.

Anant, a devotee of Dattatreya, takes Aadi and Gayatri on a pilgrimage to Narsobawadi to seek blessings for Aadi's career. There Anant suffers a fall and injures his spine, leaving him bedridden. At the same moment, Aadi receives a call about a significant film role, but he is unable to attend the look test because he has to look after his grandfather. He later secures a lead role from the same producer, but on his very first day of shooting Anant falls again at home, forcing Aadi to abandon the set. Overwhelmed by frustration, Aadi lashes out at his grandfather and nearly strikes him. Over time, Aadi comes to regret his behaviour and seeks Anant's forgiveness.

== Cast ==
- Ashok Saraf as Anantrao "Anant" Bhalerao
- Sankarshan Karhade as Aaditya "Aadi" Bhalerao
- Sakhi Gokhale as Gayatri Deshmukh
- Yogesh Shirsat as Mithun, Aadi's friend
- Kavita Lad as Suman
- Aarav Ahir as Harshad
- Aishwarya Kulkarni as Mithun's wife
- Neeta Donde as Harshad's mother
- Vaidehi Parshurami as a celebrity (cameo appearance)
- Shrirang Godbole as a stage-play director (cameo appearance)
- Shantanu Bhake as a casting director (cameo appearance)
- Guru Thakur (cameo appearance)
- Nivedita Saraf (cameo appearance)
- Mahesh Limaye as a photographer (cameo appearance)

== Production ==
Sankarshan Karhade announced the project through a social media post on Ashok Saraf's birthday. Aadi Anant marks Karhade's debut as a feature-film writer, having penned its story, screenplay and dialogues, and it also marks his first on-screen collaboration with Saraf. Describing his approach, Limaye said he wanted to capture how the worth of a relationship is often felt in small, everyday moments rather than in dramatic events.

== Marketing ==
The film's first poster was unveiled on 2 October 2026 at Jejuri, following the team's visit to seek blessings from Khandoba. Featuring Karhade resting in Saraf's lap, the poster also announced the film's theatrical release date of 12 November. The teaser was released in mid-October. At the film's music launch, the devotional song "Digambara Digambara" was unveiled, and Saraf's tabla performance at the event drew attention.

The official trailer was released later in October and was unveiled by family members of the cast and crew.

== Soundtrack ==
Aadi Anant

Soundtrack album by Avinash–Vishwajeet
- Released: 7 November 2026
- Genre: Feature film soundtrack
- Length: 11:51
- Language: Marathi
- Label: Panorama Music

Avinash–Vishwajeet chronology
| Tath Kana (2025) | Aadi Anant (2026) |

The film's music is composed by the duo Avinash–Vishwajeet, with the soundtrack featuring a mix of musical styles, including the rap track "Aamchya Veli Asa Nhavta".

Track listing
| No. | Title | Lyrics | Singer(s) | Length |
|---|---|---|---|---|
| 1. | "Digambara Digambara" | Guru Thakur | Rahul Deshpande | 6:01 |
| 2. | "Amcha Veli Asa Navta" | Sankarshan Karhade, Sujay Jadhav | Vishwajeet Joshi | 1:47 |
| 3. | "Sobatine Tujhya" | Guru Thakur | Shivam Singh, Apurva Nisshad | 4:02 |
| Total length: | | | | 11:51 |

== Release ==
=== Theatrical ===
Aadi Anant was released in theatres on 12 November 2026 by Panorama Studios.

=== Festival ===
The film was selected among the 25 feature films in the Indian Panorama section of the 57th International Film Festival of India, held in Goa from 20 to 28 November 2026. It was one of four Marathi feature films chosen for the section.

== Reception ==
=== Critical response ===
Ashish Ningurkar of Aapla Mahanagar gave the film 4 out of 5 stars, applauding its acting, writing, direction, music, and emotional impact, calling it "an emotional experience that teaches us to look at our people in a new way." Anub George of The Times of India awarded 3.5 out of 5 stars, commending Ashok Saraf’s performance and the film’s emotional depth, and called it “a deeply emotional tale of struggle to find one's place in the world without losing the love one already has.” Reshma Raikwar of Loksatta lauded the film's heartfelt narrative, relatable family dynamics, performances, and direction, remarking that there was “such a wonderful feeling of ease while watching this film.” Subhash K. Jha gave Aadi Anant 3.5 out of 5 stars, highlighting its emotional resonance and well-crafted writing, and called it “a sobering closure without any signs of breathlessness. This is not a small achievement.” Santosh Bhingarde of Sakal rated 3.5 out of 5 stars with praise for performances, dialogues, music, and cinematography, and observed "Although this film tells a touching and emotional story of a grandfather and grandson, it also tells how important relationships are in today's fast-paced life... how important it is to maintain moisture in a relationship and how important it is to give time to each other."

Rajiv Vijayakar of South Asian Herald gave the film 3 out of 5 stars, with an additional star for Saraf's performance. He found the actor “plain fabulous” and felt his portrayal was deserving of at least one award. Sujit Shirke of Lokmat gave the film 3 out of 5 stars, appreciating its emotional narrative, direction, screenplay, and music, despite a slow beginning, and characterized it as “an introspective experience.” Anupama Gunde of Pudhari rated the film 3 out of 5 stars, commending Saraf, Sankarshan Karhade, and Sakhi Gokhale for their performances, while pointing out that some scenes lacked dialogue suited to the situation, while added, "Otherwise, it is a film that today's generation should watch to understand the value of relationships."

Following a special screening, Maharashtra's Minister of Cultural Affairs Ashish Shelar praised the cast's performances and the direction, encouraging audiences to watch the film with their families.

=== Box office ===
The film collected over ₹1.25 crore net at the Indian box office during its first four days, with collections witnessing an increase on the fourth day. By 16 November 2026, the film had grossed ₹1.69 crore worldwide.
