= Private Investigator (TV series) =

Indian crime fiction-detective TV series

- Also known as: P.I Private Investigator
- Genre: Crime fiction; Drama; Police procedural; Comedy
- Starring: For entire cast see below
- Country of origin: India
- Original language: Hindi
- No. of seasons: 1
- No. of episodes: 17

Production
- Running time: Around 45 Minutes
- Production company: Fremantle Media India

Original release
- Network: Star Plus
- Release: 7 December 2014 – 12 April 2015

Private Investigator (P.I.) is an Indian crime drama television series that aired on Star Plus on Sunday evening. It was produced by Fremantle Media India Productions. It starred Mrinal Dutt as Raffe Roy Choudhary in the main lead.

== Overview ==
The main character, Raffe Roy Choudhary, is a 21-year old first-year Criminology student and was extremely enthusiastic towards the happenings and crimes around him and wanted to help solve these criminal cases. He helps the police inspector Tiwari in several crime cases. His natural instincts and sharp problem-solving skills help to solve crime cases.

== Cast ==
- Mrinal Dutt as Raffe Roy Choudhary/Satya
- Sandhya Mridul as Anita Roy Choudhary/Nivedita (Raffe's mother)
- Vrajesh Hirjee as Inspector A K Tiwari
- Roshan Preet as Raghav
- Priya Chauhan as Dhanalakshmi Rajalakshmi Shrijaya Venkataraman (aka Lucky)
- Aamir Bashir as Vijay Clamaine Pereira (aka VC)
- Athar Siddiqui as Abhijeet
- Manasi Varma as Kamini Mehra (Episode 13)
- Mayur More as Rickshaw Guy

== Reception ==
=== Critical reviews ===
Letty Mariam Abraham of Bollywood Life rated the series at a 2.5/5 and wrote "Private Investigator has the potential to be something really interesting. For now the series is just about average with really nothing too interesting or out of the world."
