= Mumbai Diaries (TV series) =

Indian Hindi-language medical drama series

- Official Release Poster
- Genre: Medical drama Thriller
- Created by: Nikkhil Advani
- Based on: 2008 Mumbai attacks; Maharashtra floods of 2005
- Screenplay by: Nikhil Gonsalves; Anushka Mehrotra (Season 1); Yash Chettija; Persis Sodawaterwalla (Season 2)
- Directed by: Nikkhil Advani; Nikhil Gonsalves
- Starring: Mohit Raina; Konkona Sen Sharma; Mrunmayee Deshpande; Satyajeet Dubey; Shreya Dhanwanthary; Natasha Bharadwaj; Tina Desai; Pawan Shankar
- Composer: Ashutosh Phatak
- Country of origin: India
- Original language: Hindi
- No. of seasons: 2
- No. of episodes: 16

Production
- Executive producer: Rameshchandra Yadav
- Producers: Monisha Advani; Madhu Bhojwani
- Cinematography: Kaushal Shah (Season 1); Malay Prakash (Season 2)
- Editor: Maahir Zaverik
- Running time: 36–50 minutes
- Production company: Emmay Entertainment

Original release
- Network: Amazon Video
- Release: 9 September 2021 – present

Mumbai Diaries is an Indian Hindi-language medical thriller television series. It is set in the emergency room of a government hospital, focusing on the challenges faced by medical staff and first responders during times of crises. It was released on Amazon Prime Video on 9 September 2021. The series was created and directed by Nikkhil Advani, along with Nikhil Gonsalves. The filming of the series took place in real locations that were part of the 2008 Mumbai attacks, including Chhatrapati Shivaji Terminus, Gateway of India, and Leopold Café.

Mumbai Diaries was renewed for a second season and released on 6 October 2023. The story of the second season is based on the 2005 Mumbai floods, with Mohit Raina and Konkona Sen Sharma reprising their roles from the previous season.

At the 2022 Filmfare OTT Awards, Mumbai Diaries 26/11 received 10 nominations, including Best Drama Series, Best Director in a Drama Series (Advani & Gonsalves), Best Actor in a Drama Series (Raina) and Best Supporting Actress in a Drama Series (Sen Sharma), and won Best Adapted Screenplay (Series) (Nikhil Gonsalves, Anushka Mehrotra and Yash Chetija).

== Synopsis ==
The story of the first season is set during the 2008 Mumbai attacks, it follows the staff of Bombay General Hospital and their travails during the fateful night of 26 November 2008. It also shows incidents happening at the Taj Mahal Palace Hotel and how a journalist tries to report these incidents.

The story of the second season takes place six months after the first season, and is set against the backdrop of Mumbai flooding (similar to the Maharashtra floods of 2005) and focuses on the efforts of the medical staff to save the lives of numerous people both in the city and the ER.

== Cast ==
=== Main ===
- Mohit Raina as Dr. Kaushik Oberoi, Head of Trauma Surgery at Bombay General Hospital and Ananya's husband
- Konkona Sen Sharma as Dr. Chitra Das, Director of Social Services at Bombay General Hospital
- Natasha Bharadwaj as Dr. Diya Parekh, first year surgical resident at Bombay General Hospital
- Satyajeet Dubey as Dr. Ahaan Mirza, first year surgical resident at Bombay General Hospital
- Mrunmayee Deshpande as Dr. Sujata Ajawale, first year surgical resident at Bombay General Hospital
- Shreya Dhanwanthary as Journalist Mansi Hirani
- Prakash Belawadi as Dr. Madhusudan Subramaniam, Chief Medical Officer at Bombay General Hospital (Recurring season 1, Regular season 2)
- Parambrata Chattopadhyay as Dr. Saurav Chandra, Chitra's abusive and evil estranged husband, Head of Pediatrics at a London Hospital (season 2)
- Riddhi Dogra as Dr. Sandhya D'Souza (Season 2)
- Tina Desai as Ananya Ghosh Oberoi, Dr. Oberoi's wife and Head of F & B Services at the Taj Palace Hotel
- Balaji Gauri as Sneha Cherian
- Harssh A. Singh as Dr. Farukh Romani
- Mishal Raheja as Dr. Sahil Aggarwal, Visiting Surgeon at Bombay General Hospital and Chief of Ellora Hospital (season 1)

=== Recurring ===
- Sandesh Kulkarni as ACP Mahesh Tawde (killed in season 1)
- Akshar Kothari as Inspector Mayank Bhat
- Rishabh Arora as Vasu Paul, the security guard at Bombay General Hospital, Vidya's brother (killed in season 1)
- Adithi Kalkunte as Nurse Vidya Paul, Vasu's sister
- Pushkaraj Chirputkar as Nurse Samarth Joshi
- Sonali Kulkarni as Mrs. Kelkar, ATS Chief Anant Kelkar's wife
- Vikram Acharya as Rudro, Ananya's colleague at Taj Palace Hotel
- Mohini Sharma as Paramjeet Kaur, elderly patient at Bombay General Hospital
- Sonali Sachdev as Dr. Shamita Parekh, Dr. Diya's mother (killed in season 1)
- Indraneel Bhattacharya as Dr. Pranab Parekh, Dr. Diya's father
- Aalekh Kapoor as Major Krishnan

== Episodes ==
No.	Title	Directed by	Written by	Original release date
1	"Diagnosis"	Nikhil Advani, Nikhil Gonsalves	Nikhil Gonsalves, Yash Chetija, Anushka Mehrotra	9 September 2021
The series starts with 10 terrorists entering Mumbai through sea route. A journalist trying to get information from a person working in the hospital for some news. As soon as the journalist leaves after meeting him, there's an attack at the Leopold Cafe by two terrorists. Diya Parekh (Natasha Bharadwaj) is the daughter of the chairman of Bombay General Hospital and is appointed there as resident along with two other residents Ahaan Mirza (Satyajeet Dubey) and Sujata Ajawale (Mrunmayee Deshpande) under Dr. Kaushik Oberoi (Mohit Raina), who is one of the best doctors working at Bombay General Hospital.
2	"Complications"	Nikhil Advani, Nikhil Gonsalves	Nikhil Gonsalves, Yash Chetija, Anushka Mehrotra	9 September 2021
3	"Malignant"	Nikhil Advani, Nikhil Gonsalves	Nikhil Gonsalves, Yash Chetija, Anushka Mehrotra	9 September 2021
4	"Anatomy"	Nikhil Advani, Nikhil Gonsalves	Nikhil Gonsalves, Yash Chetija, Anushka Mehrotra	9 September 2021
5	"Side Effects"	Nikhil Advani, Nikhil Gonsalves	Nikhil Gonsalves, Yash Chetija, Anushka Mehrotra	9 September 2021
6	"Relapse"	Nikhil Advani, Nikhil Gonsalves	Nikhil Gonsalves, Yash Chetija, Anushka Mehrotra	9 September 2021
7	"Remission"	Nikhil Advani, Nikhil Gonsalves	Nikhil Gonsalves, Yash Chetija, Anushka Mehrotra	9 September 2021
8	"Recovery"	Nikhil Advani, Nikhil Gonsalves	Nikhil Gonsalves, Yash Chetija, Anushka Mehrotra	9 September 2021

== Reception ==
The show has an critics' approval rating of 88% on review aggregator website Rotten Tomatoes. Bhavna Agarwal from Bollywood Bubble gave the web-series a rating of 3.5 stars out of 5 and wrote, "Mohit Raina, Konkona Sen Sharma starrer is an uplifting re-telling of the frightening terror attack. Mumbai Diaries 26/11 is undeniably a medical drama you won't regret seeing. It is attention-grabbing and impactful." Overall the show has received generally positive reviews.

Ronak Kotecha from The Times of India gave 3 out of 5 stars and noted "All in all, it's a hard-hitting show alright, made with a lot of blood and sweat too, which shows onscreen, but in a bid to pack in too much action and drama, Mumbai Diaries ends up becoming a never-ending saga of insipid characters rather than a taut thriller of a life-altering real event."

Anuj Kumar of The Hindu said "Overall, Mumbai Diaries 26/11 reads like a diary of a person who knows how to smartly conceal his real emotions."

Saibal Chatterjee from NDTV gave season 1, a rating of three and a half stars out of five and wrote "Mumbai Diaries 26/11 is undoubtedly top-notch in terms of both its craft and its creative choices."

Praising the performance of cast, The Indian Express reviewer stated "Mumbai Diaries 26/11 works best when, in between all the craziness, some of the characters stop to take a breath, and exchange glances or words. It makes you believe that there is still some goodness in the world."

However, the Season 2 has received a mixed response, where critics state that a rushed up work has failed to create impact on viewers.

== Accolades ==
Year	Award ceremony	Category	Nominee / work	Result	Ref.
2022	Filmfare OTT Awards	Best Drama Series	Mumbai Diaries 26/11	Nominated	
2022	Filmfare OTT Awards	Best Director in a Drama Series	Nikkhil Advani and Nikhil Gonsalves	Nominated	
2022	Filmfare OTT Awards	Best Actor in a Drama Series	Mohit Raina	Nominated	
2022	Filmfare OTT Awards	Best Supporting Actress in a Drama Series	Konkona Sen Sharma	Nominated	
2022	Filmfare OTT Awards	Best Adapted Screenplay (Series)	Nikhil Gonsalves, Anushka Mehrotra and Yash Chetija	Won	
2022	Filmfare OTT Awards	Best Production Design (Series)	Priya Suhas	Nominated	
2022	Filmfare OTT Awards	Best Cinematographer (Series)	Kaushal Shah	Nominated	
2022	Filmfare OTT Awards	Best Costume Design (Series)	Sheetal Sharma	Nominated	
2022	Filmfare OTT Awards	Best Editing (Series)	Maahir Zaveri	Nominated	
2022	Filmfare OTT Awards	Best VFX (Series)	Futureworks	Nominated	
