= Bharatiya Digital Party =

Marathi-language YouTube channel

- Bharatiya Digital Party
- Other names: BhaDiPa

YouTube information
- Channel: Bharatiya Digital Party
- Genres: Comedy; Parody; Satire; Music
- Subscribers: 1.5 million
- Last updated: 9 March 2024

Bharatiya Digital Party is a Marathi YouTube Channel, popularly known as BhaDiPa. They are known for their comedy and music videos. As of October 2018, it had 150 million views across their Facebook page and YouTube Channel and more than 1.5 Million subscribers on YouTube. The channel was founded by Sarang Sathaye, Anusha Nandakumar and Paula McGlynn.

== Work ==
In 2016, BhaDiPa started the satirical talk show Casting Couch with Amey and Nipun, hosted by Amey Wagh and Nipun Dharmadhikari. It is inspired by Zach Galifianakis' Between the Two Ferns. The show aired 7 episodes with celebrity guests that include Sai Tamhankar, Shriya Pilgaonkar, Sakhi Gokhale, Pooja Thombre, Swanandi Tikekar, Priya Bapat and Radhika Apte. They also released a song titled Maharashtra Desha, sung by Mithila Palkar and Gandhaar, on the occasion of Maharashtra Day in 2016. The video was directed by Sarang Sathaye. In 2017, they organised a Marathi stand-up comedy event called Secret Marathi Stand-up. The line-up of comedians for the event included Sarang Sathaye, Aditya Desai, Gaurav Pawar, Divya Kharnare, Omkar Rege, Darshan Sonvale, Chetan Muley and Nipun Dharmadhikari. They hosted shows in Mumbai, Pune, Thane, Vashi, Navi Mumbai, Nagpur and Nashik.

BhaDiPa has also released their song originals. On 14 February 2021 on the occasion of Valentine's Day, they released the song 'Suii Suii' in a collaboration with A V Prafullachandra.

They collaborated with comedian Abish Mathew in 2018. They also produced the short film titled Aai ani Me series featuring Renuka Daftardar, Mrinmayee Godbole and Alok Rajwade and Sarang Sathaye. In 2018, they created a Harry Potter spoof video, titled If Hogwarts was a Marathi School, featuring actors like Abhay Mahajan and Mohan Agashe. They also have various series like Aaplya Baapachi and Miss Manners che Sanskar Varga.

In 2019, BhaDiPa started producing neutral election-related content in the run up to the 2019 Lok Sabha elections. They also received funding under the Google News Initiative to develop new product features and improve the news experience of YouTube. They launched a platform called Lok Manch, where they interacted with Devendra Fadnavis, the former chief minister of Maharashtra; Swabhimani Paksha leader Raju Shetti and NCP leader, Supriya Sule. BhaDiPa has produced two Web Series. 'Pandu' on MX Player and 'Chikatgunde' on YouTube.

BhaDiPa collaborated with TVF to produce web series Shantit Kranti. It aired in Sony Liv on 13 August 2021. They reached 1 Million Subscribers on YT on 23 August 2021 thus gaining the Golden Play Button.

BhaDiPa created a webseries based in an office in 2022, called as '9 to 5.' It starred Alok Rajwade, Girija Oak and Sagar Deshmukh. Its second season was released the same year. BhaDiPa produced & collaborated with Scaler to present one of its biggest hits "B.E.Rojgaar" which was created by Sarang Sathaye in 2022. The web-series starred Sai Tamhankar, Sambhaji Sasane & Jagdish Kannam went on to become one of the most watched Marathi Web Series of all time on YouTube.

Bhadipa created their inclusive responsive media website in year 2020 with one of the Responsive Website Development Company in Mumbai called as CreativeWebo Pvt. Ltd

BDP received Newsmakers Achievers Awards in 2022.
