= Dokyala Shot =

Marathi language thriller film

- Directed by: Shivkumar Parthasarathy
- Story by: Shivkumar Parthasarathy Varun Narvekar
- Produced by: Viva Inen; Uttung Hitendra Thakur
- Starring: Suvrat Joshi; Prajakta Mali; Omkar Govardhan; Rohit Haldikar; Ganesh Pandit
- Production company: Viva Inen
- Release date: 1 March 2019
- Running time: 122 min
- Country: India
- Language: Marathi

Dokyala Shot is a 2019 Marathi-language thriller film directed by Shivkumar Parthasarathy and produced by Uttung Hitendra Thakur. A Marathi boy suffers a head injury which results in him losing his memory. After the accident, his friends find out that he has no clue about his impending marriage. This movie is a remake of the Tamil film Naduvula Konjam Pakkatha Kaanom (2012), and is based on the incidents that occurred in the life of the film's cameraman premiere. The directorial debut film is based on a true story. The film was released on 1 March 2019 to critical acclaim.

== Cast ==
- Suvrat Joshi as Abhijit
- Prajakta Mali as Subbulakshmi
- Omkar Govardhan as Chandu
- Rohit Haldikar as Bhajji
- Ganesh Pandit as Ganesh

== Release ==
The first look poster was released on 26 November 2019, in which Suvrat Joshi, Prajakta Mali, Rohit Haldikar, Ganesh Pandit and Omkar Govardhan appeared. Music and trailer was launched by Riteish Deshmukh and Kailash Kher in presence of cast and crew.

== Reception ==
A critic from The Times of India gave the film a rating of three out of five stars and stated that "It's been a long time since a Marathi film that made you roll with laughter released. Dokyala Shot achieves a lot without having big stars in it and the film definitely warrants a watch".
