= Dhappa =

- Theatrical release poster
- Directed by: Nipun Dharmadhikari
- Screenplay by: Girish Kulkarni; Nipun Dharmadhikari
- Story by: Girish Kulkarni
- Produced by: Sumatilal Shah
- Cinematography: Swapnil S. Sonawane
- Edited by: Suchitra Sathe
- Music by: Gandhaar
- Production company: Ink Tales
- Release date: 1 February 2019
- Country: India
- Language: Marathi

Dhappa is a 2019 Indian Marathi-language drama film directed by Nipun Dharmadhikari in his directorial debut. The film features several debutante child actors and was inspired by a true incident. The film was shown at various film festivals including Jio MAMI 20th Mumbai Film Festival.

== Cast ==
- Deepali Borkar
- Sharav Wadhawekar
- Sharavi Kulkarni
- Shrihari Abhyankar
- Akash Kamble
- Jyoti Subhash
- Girish Kulkarni
- Iravati Harshe
- Vrushali Kulkarni as Anuradha

== Reception ==
A critic from The Times of India rated the film 3 1/2 out of 5 and opined that "Dhappa is not an aesthetically outstanding film and it has some loose ends as well. But what it lacks there, the film makes up for through its execution and performances". A critic from Firstpost rated the film 3 1/2 out of 5 and said that "The film may set out to charm the viewer, but it does so with a bracing quality, and it is all put together in a palette that mashes whimsy with socio-political commentary, all in a non-cynical, positive sense". A critic from Lokmat rated the film 3 1/2 out of 5. A critic from Scroll.in wrote that "Nipun Dharmadhikari’s Marathi-language movie fires its message of inter-faith tolerance and the need for free speech over the shoulders of children".

== Awards and nominations ==
- Nargis Dutt Award for Best Feature Film on National Integration - Won
- Indian Panorama section of International Film Festival of India
- Critics’ Choice Film Awards 2020
  - Best Director - Nominated
  - Best Film - Nominated
  - Best Writing - Nominated
