= Manaswini Lata Ravindra =

Marathi playwright, screenwriter and film director

Manaswini Lata Ravindra is a Marathi playwright, screenwriter and director, known for writing the play Amar Photo Studio and also being one of the writers of the Marathi sitcom Dil Dosti Duniyadari. In 2016, she is a recipient of the Sahitya Akademi Yuva Puraskar for her short story collection, Blogchya Aarshyapallyad.

== Early life ==
She started writing poetry at the age of 3. She joined Lalit Kala Kendra of Pune University after her 12th and got a Bachelor of Arts degree. She graduated from Lalit Kala Kendra in 2003. Manaswini and some of her friends and alumni of Lalit Kala Kendra have started a theatre group called Lalit Mumbai.

== Career ==
Ravindra wrote her first play Cigarettes when she was 20. In 2006, she won the Ustad Bismillah Khan Yuva Puraskar in Playwriting, given by Sangeet Natak Akademi. In the same year, she attended the Royal Court Theatre workshop at Vasind. In 2007, she wrote the play Alvida. In 2010, she was also part of Pratibimb, the first ever contemporary Marathi theatre festival, organised by NCPA at Mumbai. She is also credited to have directed the play, Ekmekaat in 2009. In 2014, her play Lakh Lakh Chanderi was staged at Pratibimb Marathi Theatre Festival., she won the Sahitya Akademi Award in the youth category, for Blogchya Arshapalyad (a collection of short stories).

In 2017, she also spoke at Jawab Do, an event organised by Maharashtra Andhashraddha Nirmoolan Samiti. She also won the first position for best writing in the Maharashtra State Marathi Professional Drama Competition, in 2017, for her play Amar Photo Studio. She is also an executive committee member of Screenwriters Association, Mumbai. She was nominated for Filmfare Awards (Marathi) for best screenplay, for the movie Ti Saddhya Kay Karte in 2018.

== Works ==
=== Plays ===
Year	Play	Notes
2006	Cigarettes	
2007	Alvida	
2009	Ekmekaat	Writer/Director
2014	Lakh Lakh Chanderi	Writer/Director
2019	Daavikadun Chouthi Building	Writer
	Majhya Vatnicha Kharakhur	
	Amar Photo Studio	

=== TV shows ===
- Lek Ladki Hya Gharchi (aired on ETV Marathi)
- Eka Lagnachi Dusri Goshta (aired on Zee Marathi)
- Dil Dosti Duniyadari (aired on Zee Marathi)
- Bun Maska ( aired on Zee Yuva )
- Ti Phulrani ( aired on Sony Marathi )

=== Movies ===
- Rama Madhav.
- Ti Saddhya Kay Karte
- Kaccha Limboo

== Personal life ==
She is married to director Satish Manwar. Her parents were social activists. Her mother, Lata Pratibha Madhukar, is an activist with Narmada Bachao Andolan whereas her father, Ravindra, is a campaigner against female foeticide. She uses her parents' name instead of her surname. She and her mother were jointly awarded the Prerna Puraskar in 2014 by DD Sahyadri on their Mother's Day special.
