= Coldd Lassi Aur Chicken Masala =

Indian web series

- Genre: Web series Romance; Drama
- Created by: Ekta Kapoor
- Developed by: Ekta Kapoor; Doris Dey
- Screenplay by: Jaya Misra
- Story by: Doris Dey; Jaya Misra
- Directed by: Pradeep Sarkar
- Creative directors: Manjeet Sachdev; Doyel. P. Som. Krishna Pandey
- Starring: Rajeev Khandelwal; Divyanka Tripathi
- Theme music composer: Anu Malik
- Composer: Manoj Muntashir
- Country of origin: India
- Original languages: Hindi, English
- No. of seasons: 1
- No. of episodes: 12

Production
- Producers: Doris Dey & Suhail Zaidi
- Production locations: Mumbai, Maharashtra India
- Editors: Vikas Sharma; Vishal Sharma; Sandip Bhatt
- Camera setup: Multi-camera
- Running time: 19-25 minutes
- Production company: Linga Bhairavi Devi Productions

Original release
- Network: ALT Balaji; ZEE5
- Release: 3 September 2019

Coldd Lassi Aur Chicken Masala (Cold Buttermilk and Chicken Masala) is an Indian romantic comedy web series starring Divyanka Tripathi Dahiya and Rajeev Khandelwal. Produced by Doris Dey & Suhail Zaidi it is directed by Pradeep Sarkar. The filming of the series began in February 2019 in Vadodara. The story revolves around two hotel management students, Nitya and Vikram, who later become chefs. It marks the debut of Tripathi in the digital medium. The series premiered on 3 September 2019 on ALT Balaji. It is also available on ZEE5.

== Plot ==
Fate brings former couple Nithya, Indie Spice's head chef, and Vikram, a Michelin Star chef, together after 8 yrs. Memories of the lost love return along with bitterness of the past. Vikram comes back into Nitya's life after eight years. They have a child together Vivaan. Revati and Nitya's restaurant is not doing well, and Vikram and Manira have bought shares in the restaurant.

== Cast ==
=== Main ===
- Divyanka Tripathi Dahiya as Chef Nitya Sharma– Head Chef; Vikram's former wife; Vivaan's mother
- Rajeev Khandelwal as Chef Vikram Singh Chauhan– Nitya's former husband; Vivaan's father

=== Recurring ===
- Priyanshu Chatterjee as Dr. Karan Kapadia - Psychiatrist; Nitya's friend
- Barkha Bisht as Seema - Nithya's cousin, Vikram's one nightstand
- Navneet Nishan as Shaila, Vikram's mother
- Manini Mishra as Revati - Restaurant owner
- Vidhaan Sharma as Vivaan Singh Chauhan- Nithya and Vikram's son
- Rajveer Dey as Junaid
- Jaswinder Gardener as Mrinalini
- Madhu Sneha as Tanvi - Nitya's friend
- Mrinal Dutt as Kayzad Sonawala - Vikram's friend
- Worshipp Khanna as Chef Deven
- Errol Marks as Shekhar - Vikram's Sister's Husband
- Saloni Khanna as Manira - Vikram's Business partner
- Srishti Wadhwani as Shushma
- Serena Walia as Gauri Singh Chauhan - Vikram's Sister
- Riva Arora as Tara Kapadia - Karan's Daughter
- Munawar Faruqui as Roast Comic

== Episodes ==
No. overall	No. in season	Title	Directed by	Written by	Original release date	Duration (minutes)
1	1	"Raita Phail Gaya"	Pradeep Sarkar	Jaya Misra	3 September 2019	28
2	2	"Not-so-Dost Ka Roast"	Pradeep Sarkar	Jaya Misra	3 September 2019	33
3	3	"Haal-e-Haldi Haldi"	Pradeep Sarkar	Jaya Misra	3 September 2019	28
4	4	"Kuch Bitter Kuch Sweet"	Pradeep Sarkar	Jaya Misra	3 September 2019	33
5	5	"Midnight Masala"	Pradeep Sarkar	Jaya Misra	3 September 2019	35
6	6	"Dil, Dimag aur Dard-e-Dum"	Pradeep Sarkar	Jaya Misra	3 September 2019	30
7	7	"Sharm Ka Saag Aur Makkari Ki Roti"	Pradeep Sarkar	Jaya Misra	3 September 2019	27
8	8	"Cheating Chello Kebabs"	Pradeep Sarkar	Jaya Misra	7 September 2019	29
9	9	"Ek Tub Ice-cream, Do Scoop Dhokha"	Pradeep Sarkar	Jaya Misra	7 September 2019	25
10	10	"Kabhi Neem Neem, Kabhi Shehed Shehed"	Pradeep Sarkar	Jaya Misra	7 September 2019	27
11	11	"Galouti Gileh Shikwey"	Pradeep Sarkar	Jaya Misra	10 September 2019	34
12	12	"Mashed in Mohabbat, Baked in Love"	Pradeep Sarkar	Jaya Misra	10 September 2019	23
