= Befaam =

2021 Marathi film

- Directed by: Krishna Kamble
- Story by: Vidyasagar Adhyapak
- Produced by: Amol Kagne
- Starring: Mahadev Abhyankar; Siddharth Chandekar; Seema Deshmukh; Sakhi Gokhale
- Cinematography: Prasad Bhende
- Release date: 26 February 2021
- Country: India
- Language: Marathi

Befaam is a 2021 Indian Marathi-language film directed by Krishna Kamble and produced by Amol Kagne. It was released on 26 February 2021 and available on ZEE5.

== Cast ==
- Mahadev Abhyankar
- Siddharth Chandekar as Siddharth
- Seema Deshmukh as Siddharth's Mother
- Sakhi Gokhale as RJ Nandita
- Vidyadhar Joshi as Siddharth's Father
- Nachiket Purnapatre
- Kamlesh Sawant
- Shashank Shende. as Sarvanand Maharaj

== Reception ==
Anup Satphale of The Times of India gave 3 out of 5 stars.
