= Party (2018 film) =

2018 Marathi-language comedy drama film

- Directed by: Sachin Darekar
- Story by: Sachin Darekar; Prashant Loke
- Produced by: Jitendra Ramesh Chivelkar; Jamashp Bapuna; AmitPankaj Parikh
- Starring: Suvrat Joshi; Akshay Tanksale; Prajakta Mali; Stavan Shinde; Rohit Haldikar; Manjiri Pupala; Rajendra Shisatkar; Falguni Rajani
- Cinematography: Raja Satankar
- Edited by: Faisal Imran
- Music by: Amitraj
- Production companies: Navvidha Productions; Dark Horse Cinemas
- Release date: 7 September 2018
- Running time: 157 minutes
- Country: India
- Language: Marathi

Party is a 2018 Indian Marathi-language comedy drama film directed by Sachin Darekar. The film stars Suvrat Joshi, Vedant Patil, Akshay Tanksale, Prajakta Mali, Stavan Shinde, Rohit Haldikar, and Manjiri Pupala. It was released on 7 September 2018.

== Cast ==
- Suvrat Joshi as Omkar
- Akshay Tanksale as Chakarya
- Prajakta Mali as Arpita
- Stavan Shinde as Sumeet
- Rohit Haldikar as Manya
- Sandesh Upashyam as Shashi
- Manjiri Pupala as Deepali
- Rajendra Shisatkar as Bhau Bhoir
- Falguni Rajani as Varsha Bhabhi
- Rajesh Deshpande
- Milind Phatak
- Suruchi Singh
- Bharat Sawle
- Pratap Kalke
- Umesh Damle
- Abha Velankar
- Madhavi Juvekar
- Ravi Mulve
- Varsha Dandale
- Ramesh Wani
- Mrunali Tambadkar
- Smita Apte
- Jasbir Thandi as Inspector
