= Dil Dosti Dobara =

2017 Marathi language TV series

- Also known as: 3D
- Genre: Sitcom
- Created by: Sanjay Jadhav; Ashish Pathare
- Screenplay by: Ashish Pathare
- Story by: Sanjay Jadhav
- Directed by: Adwait Dadarkar
- Starring: See below
- Country of origin: India
- Original language: Marathi
- No. of episodes: 152

Production
- Producer: Sanjay Jadhav
- Editor: Prathamesh Patkar
- Camera setup: Multi-camera
- Running time: 22 minutes
- Production company: Dreaming 24/7 Productions

Original release
- Network: Zee Marathi
- Release: 18 February – 12 August 2017

Related
- Dil Dosti Duniyadari

Dil Dosti Dobara is an Indian Marathi language TV series which aired on Zee Marathi. It is a spin-off series from Dil Dosti Duniyadari. It premiered from 18 February 2017 by replacing 100 Days. It is produced by Sanjay Jadhav and directed by Vinod Lavhekar.

== Plot ==
The story revolves around six friends who are struggling to achieve success. They come up with an idea to open a restaurant and what ensues ahead is a roller coaster ride. They struggle, fight, but finally stand by each other.

== Cast ==
=== Main ===
- Pooja Thombre as Anandi. A very sweet orphan and left the orphanage when she turned 18. She gave shelter to Mukta and Pari and is beautician by profession. She can't cook good food.
- Suvrat Joshi as Gaurav Bal. He left his house when learned about his father's corrupt policies. He was the agent of Magnet Water Company which eventually turned out to fraud and Gaurav lives with the guilt.
- Swanandi Tikekar as Mukta. She is from Beed and used to love studies but left her home and studies to shift to Mumbai to earn money for her family of Mother and three younger sisters.
- Pushkaraj Chirputkar as Phanindranath "Papya" Rane. He dislikes his name and hence gets called as Papya and is a known social activist. He leaves his house of Lalbaug due to accommodation issues. His best childhood friend Chandrakant (Bhapav) is attached to him. Papya is also colorblind.
- Sakhi Gokhale as Pari Patwardhan. She is an interior designer by profession who was brought up in the safe environment by her family. She fled on her wedding day due to upcoming responsibilities and want to enjoy life.
- Amey Wagh as Sahil. He is chocolate hero of the gang. He has dated many girls and is Hotel Manager by profession. He has given up 8 jobs until he starts Khayali Pulao.

=== Recurring ===
- Vikrant Shinde as Chandrakant (Bhapav). He is Papya's childhood buddy and considers his right hand. His catchphrase is "Tumcha hukum apla ekka na bhai!".
- Uday Tikekar as Captain Cook. He is a strict army chef who joins Khayali Pulao on Sahil's recommendations. He earlier used to get annoyed by the gang, but later gets used to them. He leaves Khayali Pulao when Mukta defeats him in the Pithla Bhakri Challenge.
- Anand Kale as Shirish Pradhan, Sahil's father.
- Meera Joshi as Jonita, Thapa's daughter. She is an NRI. Due to her beauty, Sahil, Gaurav, and Papya have a crush on her.
- Dhawal Pokle as Cyrus Govitrikar, Bawa and Sandhya's son; Savi's twin brother.
- Aarti More as Savitri Govitrikar, Bawa and Sandhya's daughter; Cyrus's twin sister.
- Ajinkya Joshi as Firoj Balsara, Bawa and his first wife's son.
- Vijay Patwardhan as Pari's father.
- Shraddha Pokhrankar as Urmila.
