= Manasi Varma =

Indian television actress

- Born: India
- Occupation(s): Actress, Model

Manasi Varma is an Indian television actress. She made her debut with the role of Monalika in Kahaani Ghar Ghar Kii on Star Plus. Varma also did a music video for DJ Aqueel called 'Main Hoon Don' with Jackie Shroff. In 2006, Varma anchored live shows of Sonu Nigam for his U.S. and Canada tour, after which she continued to anchor many other shows. She replaced Roshni Chopra in the leading role of Piya in the Zee TV series Kasamh Se.

== Television ==
- Kya Hadsaa Kya Haqeeqat - Kab Kyon Kahan as Jessica (Episode 177 - Episode 190) (2003)
- Kahaani Ghar Ghar Kii as Monalika Agarwal (2003 - 2005; 2008)
- Hatim as Mallika-e-Hayat (2004)
- Raat Hone Ko Hai - Nightmare (Episode 169 - Episode 172) (2005)
- Kaisa Ye Pyar Hai as Aliya (2005)
- C.I.D. as Inspector Tejali Krutia (2005)
- CID: Special Bureau as Inspector Tejali Krutia (2005 - 2006)
- Akela as Roma (Episode 25) (2006)
- Kulvaddhu as Janvi (2007)
- Solhah Singaarr as Agnishikha (2007)
- Aahat - Vampire as Sakshi (Episode 16) (2007)
- Arslaan as Aaira (2008)
- Kasamh Se as Piya Pushkar Shukla (2008 - 2009)
- Ek Thhi Naayka as Mansi (Episode 13 & Episode 14) (2013)
- Private Investigator - Suicide Or Murder ? as Kamini Mehra (Episode 13) (2015)
