= Ishq Next Door =

Indian romantic drama television series

- Genre: Romance; Drama
- Created by: Akhilesh Vats; Shaharyar Farooqui; Vyom Charaya
- Written by: Akhilesh Vats; Shaharyar Farooqui
- Directed by: Akhilesh Vats
- Starring: Abhay Mahajan; Natasha Bharadwaj; Mrinal Dutt
- Music by: Manpal Singh
- Country of origin: India
- Original language: Hindi
- No. of seasons: 1
- No. of episodes: 10

Production
- Producer: Jyoti Deshpande
- Cinematography: Midhun Chandran
- Editor: Prashant N Panda
- Production companies: Jio Studios; Rusk Studio

Original release
- Network: JioCinema
- Release: 3 July 2023

Ishq Next Door is an Indian Hindi-language romantic drama television series produced under the banner of Jio Studios. The series stars Abhay Mahajan, Natasha Bharadwaj and Mrinal Dutt. It premiered on JioCinema on 3 July 2023.

== Cast ==
- Abhay Mahajan as Dev
  - Paveet Khanjia as Young Dev
- Natasha Bharadwaj as Meher
  - Shruti Choudhary as Young Meher
- Mrinal Dutt as Ashwin
  - Karan Chokhani as Young Ashwin
- Pragati Pandey as Tanya

== Production ==
In April 2023, the series was announced by Jio Studios featuring Abhay Mahajan, Natasha Bharadwaj and Mrinal Dutt. Initially titled "Padosan", principal photography of the series began in 2023.

== Soundtrack ==
Ishq Next Door

Soundtrack album
- Released: 2023
- Genre: Soundtrack
- Length: 17:01
- Language: Hindi
- Label: Times Music

Tracklisting
No.	Title	Length
1.	"Dariya"	5:01
2.	"Dooriyan"	4:31
3.	"Ishq hai"	5:01
4.	"Mahiya Mera"	2:38
Total length:		17:01

== Reception ==
Satish Sundaresan of OTTPlay rated the series 2.5/5 stars. Dhaval Roy of Times of india gave the series 2.5/5 stars.
