= Be Dune Teen =

Marathi-language dramedy series

- Genre: Family drama, comedy
- Created by: Atharva Soundankar; Himanshu Pile
- Written by: Akshay Smita Shrinivas
- Screenplay by: Atharva Soundankar; Himanshu Pile
- Directed by: Atharva Soundankar; Himanshu Pile
- Starring: Kshitish Date; Shivani Rangole; Pushkaraj Chirputkar; Deeksha Ketkar; Virajas Kulkarni; Shubhankar Ekbote
- Country of origin: India
- Original language: Marathi
- No. of episodes: 5

Production
- Producers: Trupti Basutkar; Vaibhav Kesarkar
- Cinematography: Piyush Mahajan
- Editor: Himanshu Pile
- Production company: Vrushank Productions

Original release
- Network: ZEE5 (Marathi)
- Release: 5 December 2025

Be Dune Teen is a 2025 Indian Marathi language family dramedy streaming television series which is directed by Atharva Soundankar and Himanshu Pile and produced by Vrushank Productions. It stars Kshitish Date and Shivani Rangole as Abhay and Neha, a young married couple whose relationship is reshaped when they learn they are expecting triplets. Pushkaraj Chirputkar, Deeksha Ketkar, Virajas Kulkarni and Shubhankar Ekbote appear in supporting roles.

== Premise ==
The series follows Abhay and Neha, a married couple whose lives change after they learn during a medical visit that they are expecting triplets. The narrative moves between different points in time, depicting the pressures that arise in their relationship as they navigate financial strain, work-related challenges, shifting responsibilities, and frequent disagreements. A parallel thread shows Abhay being questioned by the police when Neha goes missing, with the storyline gradually revealing the circumstances that led to that moment. As the couple confronts misunderstandings and the demands of impending parenthood, the series traces how these events affect their relationship and the eventual arrival of their children.

== Cast ==
- Kshitish Date
- Shivani Rangole
- Pushkaraj Chirputkar
- Shubhankar Ekbote
- Deeksha Ketkar
- Virajas Kulkarni

== Production ==
Be Dune Teen is produced by Vrushank Productions for ZEE5's Marathi-language slate. The series is directed by Atharva Soundankar and Himanshu Pile, who work jointly on the episodes. It was developed as a family drama centred on the experiences of a couple preparing for the birth of triplets and uses a multi-timeline format to present events from different stages of their lives.

=== Release ===
The series is premiered on 5 December 2025 on ZEE5.
