= Suvrat Joshi =

Indian actor (born 1985)

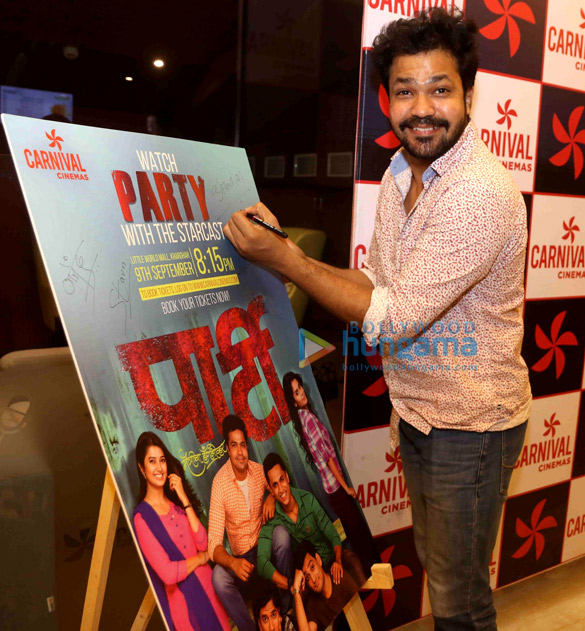
- Suvrat Joshi promoting Party
- Born: Suvrat Shekhar Joshi; 22 April 1985 (age 41); Pune, Maharashtra, India
- Education: Fergusson College; National School of Drama
- Notable work: Dil Dosti Duniyadari; Dil Dosti Dobara; Amar Photo Studio; Dokyala Shot
- Spouse: Sakhi Gokhale (m. 2019)

Suvrat Joshi (born 22 April 1985) is an Indian drama, television actor. He is widely known for his work in the Marathi sitcom, Dil Dosti Duniyadari and its sequel, Dil Dosti Dobara.

== Early life ==
He was born in Pune. His father is Laxman Joshi. He is the nephew of Jayant Godbole. Both his father and uncle were responsible for making him interested in performing arts. He is also an alumnus of Fergusson College. He participated in inter collegiate theatre competitions while at Fergusson. He won the Nirmal Award for best actor in Purushottam Karandak in 12th grade. He never thought he would pursue acting as a career and wanted to be a journalist. He is an acting and music graduate from National School of Drama.

== Career ==
He started off his career in theatre, before going into television, because he was curious about how it would be to act in front of cameras. His first commercial role was in a play where he portrayed Hitler. He played Sujay Sathe, a know-it-all owner of Majghar in Dil Dosti Duniyadari. After the TV stint, he went back to performing theatre, with Amar Photo Studio where he was accompanied by Amey Wagh, Pooja Thombre and Sakhi Gokhale from the Dil Dosti Duniyadari cast. He was part of the reboot sequel to Dil Dosti Duniyadari, titled Dil Dosti Dobara where the ensemble cast re-appeared on screen. In 2018, he made his film debut with the movie Shikari as Raghu where he was a cunning man who disrespected women. His second movie was Party (2018) where he played a college student in the 90s. His latest film project is Dokyala Shot directed by Shivkumar Parthasarathy, in which he plays a Maharashtrian boy to be married to a South Indian girl. In 2018, he also co-hosted the Jio Filmfare Awards (Marathi) 2018, along with Amey Wagh.

He also debuted as a singer in Dokyala Shot where he sang in Tamil. He has also been closely working in theatre for more than 15 years. He is currently working on a new play called Shahi Paharedaar. He also hosted the dance reality show, Dance Maharashtra Dance. In 2019, he was part of a series titled Safe Journeys. His upcoming Marathi film is Goshta Eka Paithanichi where he will be portraying the role of a florist. In September 2020 he joined a community building platform called Parva.

== Personal life ==
He dated his co-star from Dil Dosti Duniyadari, Sakhi Gokhale which was a rumour for a long time before the official announcement on their social media. They got married on 11 April 2019.

== Filmography ==
Filmography
| Year | Title | Role | Notes |
|---|---|---|---|
| 2018 | Shikari | Raghu | Marathi Film Debut |
| 2018 | Party | Omkar | |
| 2019 | Dokyala Shot | Abhijit | |
| 2020 | Mann Fakiraa | Bhushan | |
| 2022 | Goshta Eka Paithanichi | Sujit | National Film Award for Best Feature Film in Marathi |
| 2022 | Ananya | Jay Dixit | |
| 2023 | IB 71 | Agent Jadhav | Hindi Film Debut |
| 2025 | Chhaava | Kanhoji Shirke | Hindi film |
| 2025 | Tu Bol Na | Honaji | |
| 2026 | Tighee | Young Madhusudan | |

Television
| Year | Title | Role | Channel | Ref. |
|---|---|---|---|---|
| 2015-2016 | Dil Dosti Duniyadari | Sujay Sathe | Zee Marathi | |
| 2017 | Dil Dosti Dobara | Gaurav Bal | Zee Marathi | |
| 2018 | Dance Maharashtra Dance | Host | Zee Yuva | |
| 2020 | Aathashe Khidkya Naushe Daara | Narhari (Hari) Karkumbhkar | Sony Marathi | |
| 2022 | Bigg Boss Marathi 4 | Guest appearance | Colors Marathi | |

Web Series
| Year | Title | Role | Notes |
|---|---|---|---|
| 2021 | Jobless | Viraj Pathak | Planet Marathi OTT Series |
| 2023 | Taali | Munna | jio cinema TV Series |

=== Plays ===
- Varvarche Vadhu var
