= Mikhail Gandhi =

Indian male film actor

Mikail Gandhi is an Indian child actor who has performed in various films and TV series. He started his acting career with small roles in television commercials. His debut film was Telugu-language film Supreme (2016) which was followed by documentary film Sachin: A Billion Dreams (2017) where he played the role of young cricketer Sachin Tendulkar. Later he played roles in Telugu films Hello (2017) and Bharath Ane Nenu (2018).

== Filmography ==
=== Films ===
Year	Title	Role	Language	Notes
2016	Supreme	Rajan	Telugu	Film
2017	Sachin: A Billion Dreams	Sachin Tendulkar	Hindi	Documentary
2017	Hello	Seenu	Telugu	Film
2018	Bharat Ane Nenu	Siddharth	Telugu	Film
2018	Oliver	Oliver	English / Hindi	Short film

=== Web series ===
- All web series are in Hindi, unless mentioned otherwise.

Year	Title	Role
2019	Typewriter	Satyajit Tandon aka Gablu
2020	Mentalhood	Nikhil Sharma
2021	His Story	Shlok
2022	Mai: A Mother's Rage	Archit Chaudhary
2022	Tanaav	Farhaan Farooqui
2023	Dahaad	Harry
2023	Kafas	Sunny Vashisht
