= Natak Company =

Pune-based theatre group

- Natak Company
- Formation: 2008; 17 years ago
- Founded at: Pune, India
- Type: Theatre troupe
- Official language: Marathi

Natak Company is a Pune-based theatre troupe. Its previous members include Nipun Dharmadhikari, Alok Rajwade, Amey Wagh, Siddharth Menon, Abhay Mahajan and Parna Pethe. In 2018, the group celebrated its 10th anniversary by organising a theatre festival at Yashwantrao Chavan Natyagruha, Kothrud.

== History ==
The troupe formed in 2008 as a collaboration between the students of Brihan Maharashtra College of Commerce and Fergusson College. The founding members were Amey Wagh, Nipun Dharmadhikari, Siddharth Menon, Alok Rajwade, Parna Pethe, Abhay Mahajan, Om Bhutkar Gandhaar Sangoram, Dharmakirti Sumant, Soumitra Gapchup, Ravi Choudhary, Siddhesh Purkar and Sayali Pathak. It grew to around 150 members.

Since being staged in 2009, their play Dalan has received positive response. The troupe performed in Italy's Universo Teatro in 2010. In 2014, in the memory of Tanveer, Rupwedh Pratishthan awarded the group an amount of 1.3 lakhs. In 2016, they staged their play Sindhu, Sudhakar, Rum ani Itar at NCPA's Pratibimb Marathi Theatre Festival. They revived Satish Alekar's play Mahanirvan, which was performed at Vinod Doshi Memorial Fest and National School of Drama's Theatre Olympics in February 2018. In 2019, they started a year-long series of talks related to theatre, called Kaan Drushti. It was curated by Parna Pethe.

== Plays ==
The troupe is known for its experimental works and revivals of Marathi classic plays, such as Mahanirvan. Other plays include Sutti Butti, Don Shoor, Mi...Ghalib, Geli Ekvis Varsha, Patient, Binkamache Sanwad, Tem, Dalan, Sindhu Sudhakar Rum ani Itar, Aparadhi Sugandh, Natak Nako, Shivachritra ani ek, Chakra, and Ek Divas Mathakade.

Selected Plays
First show	Title	Translated Title	Writer	Director	Plot summary & Cast	Refs
2009	Geli Ekvis Warsha	In the last 21 years	Dharmakirti Sumant	Alok Rajwade	A coming-of-age play centred around a recently graduated protagonist and his personal struggles Cast: Amey Wagh, Siddharth Menon, Saylee Pathak & Manali Bibikar	
2009	Sutti Butti			Nipun Dharmadhikari	Based on the Russian story Disobedience Holiday by Sergei Mikhalkov.	
2009	Tidha	Entanglement	Saaket Kanetkar	Saaket Kanetkar	The play deals with a protagonist who has the Oedipus Complex. The story is about how he decides to tread a different path. Cast: Siddharth Menon, Gautam Reddi, Anuja Sathe, Ankita Parad	
2009	Dalan		Based on short story by DM Mirasdar Adapted to stage by Abhay Mahajan	Nipun Dharmadhikari	A comedy set in a small village in Maharashtra about a teacher who can guess whether the mother of a student would be good-looking, by looking at the child. Cast: Amey Wagh, Alok Rajwade, Depti Bawiskar, Amruta Bhagwat, Saurabh Daftardar & Amol Gokhale	
2009	Zaada Lawnara Manus	The Man Who Plants Trees		Dharmakirti Sumant	A musical play	
2009	Don Shoor	Two Bravehearts		Alok Rajwade	Based on a story by Anton Chekov. It revolves around two travellers who meet and talk to each other as the story progresses. Cast: Om Bhutkar, Abhay Mahajan	
2010	Institute of Pavtology	–	Santosh Shintre	Alok Rajwade	A satire on the problem of hooliganism. Cast: Abhay Mahajan, Aditya Patil, Akshay Tanksale, Soumitra Gapchup, Siddharth Menon, Ruturaj Shinde, Kaustubh Deshmane & Suraj Parasnis.	
2014	Binkamache Sanwad	Pointless Conversations	Dharmakirti Sumant	Alok Rajwade	It deals with the state of lack of ideals in the current youth.	
2016	Sindhu, Sudhakar, Rum ani itar	Sindhu, Sudhakar, Rum and Others	Ashutosh Potdar	Alok Rajwade	A dramatic retelling of the classic play Ekach Pyala. The story begins with Rama and Raghu, costume designers preparing towards a period film, based on the play.	
2018	A Doubtful Gaze at Uber at Midnight	–	Dharmakirti Sumant	Alok Rajwade	The story revolves around Saket and his conversations with his cab driver. It was performed first at Serendipity Arts Festival in Goa. Cast: Siddharth Menon	
2018	Mahanirvan	The Dread Departure		Satish Alekar	It is a two-act play in Marathi, set in a chawl in Pune. The story revolves around Bhaurao, a chawl dweller who struggles to convince his wife that he died in his sleep. It was first staged in 1974. Cast: Nachiket Devasthali, Siddharth Mahashabde, Sayalee Phatak	

== Recognition ==
- Cycle (Purushottam Karandak in 2005).
- Dalan (Thespo in 2008)
- Geli Ekvees Varsha (Thespo in 2009)
- Best Play for Don Shoor (Purushottam Karandak in 2009)
- Best Set and Best Actor for Don Shoor (Sawai Karandak in 2009)
- Best Play and Best Actor in Lead Role (13th Mahindra Excellence in Theatre Award in 2018)
