= Rajwade and Sons =

- Directed by: Sachin Kundalkar
- Written by: Sachin Kundalkar
- Produced by: Y.M. Deosthalee; Atul Kulkarni; Sachin Kundalkar
- Starring: Amit Riyaan; Siddharth Menon; Alok Rajwade; Mrunmayee Godbole; Krutika Deo; Atul Kulkarni; Sachin Khedekar; Mrinal Kulkarni; Digambar Bangde
- Cinematography: Arjun Sorte
- Edited by: Abhijeet Deshpande
- Music by: Debarpito; Adrian D’souza; Tejas Modak
- Production company: Kaffe Kamera
- Release date: 16 October 2015
- Country: India
- Language: Marathi

Rajwade and Sons (Marathi: "राजवाडे अॅण्ड सन्स") is a 2015 Marathi language family drama film. The movie is directed by Sachin Kundalkar. The film is produced by Y.M.Deosthalee, Atul Kulkarni and Sachin Kundalkar under studio Kaffe Kamera. It stars Amit Riyaan, Atul Kulkarni, Sachin Khedekar, Mrinal Kulkarni, Siddharth Menon, Alok Rajwade, Mrinmayee Godbole, Krutika Deo. The film had its theatrical release on 16 October 2015.

The movie had its world television premier on 18 December 2016 on Star Pravah.

== Plot ==
The movie follows the story of cousins Anay, Shweta, Ananya and Virajas, the youngest generation of the rich and powerful Rajwade family in Pune. They each wish to follow their own dreams, but their grandfather, the head of the family, has other plans for them. But the story takes a sudden twist when their young uncle Vikram Rajwade enters their life mysteriously out of nowhere. Vikram encourages each one of them to fight, argue and question the limitations set for these kids, Making them aware to live their dreams. Rajwade and Sons is the story of a happy joint family who want to find a way to stay together, in the ever-changing modern times.

== Cast ==
- Amit Riyaan as Vikram Rajwade
  - Lalit Prabhakar voiceover for Vikram Rajwade
- Siddharth Menon as Virajas Vaibhav Joshi
- Alok Rajwade as Anay Vidyadhar Rajwade
- Mrinmayee Godbole as Ananya Vaibhav Joshi
- Krutika Deo as Shweta Vidyadhar Rajwade
- Suhani Dhadphale as Tanmaya Shubhankar Rajwade
- Atul Kulkarni as Shubhankar Rajwade
- Sachin Khedekar as Vidyadhar Rajwade
- Mrinal Kulkarni as Laxmi Rajwade Joshi
- Satish Alekar as Ramesh Rajwade
- Jyoti Subhash as Sushila Rajwade
- Pournima Manohar as Sarita Vidyadhar Rajwade
- Rahul Mehendale as Vaibhav Vasant Joshi

== Critical response ==
Mihir Banage of The Times of India rated it a 3.5 out of 5 and went on to say "..Most of the cast members have a solid theatre background and their grasp of the situations is fantastic...[The movie] has ample twists and symbolism that identifies with the issues of today...". Ganesh Matkari of Pune Mirror rated the movie 4 stars out of 5 and went on to say "...The entire cast acts in unison to deliver a powerful performance....".
