= Kafas (TV series) =

Indian Hindi-language series directed by Sahil Sangha

- Official Poster
- Genre: Drama
- Created by: Subhash Kapoor
- Based on: Dark Money by Levi David Addai
- Written by: Karan Sharma
- Directed by: Sahil Sangha
- Starring: Sharman Joshi; Mona Singh; Zarina Wahab
- Music by: Pranaay
- Country of origin: India
- Original language: Hindi
- No. of seasons: 1
- No. of episodes: 6

Production
- Producers: Sameer Nair; Deepak Segal; Sahil Sangha
- Cinematography: Anubhav Bansal
- Editor: Sherwin Bernard
- Production companies: Applause Entertainment and Madiba Entertainment

Original release
- Network: SonyLIV
- Release: 23 June 2023

Kafas (transl. Cage (reference to prison), correct spelling Qafas - क़फ़स k with nuqta, stylized as #Kafas) is a 2023 Indian Hindi-language drama TV series on SonyLIV directed by Sahil Sangha. The show is produced by Applause Entertainment and Madiba Entertainment. The series stars Sharman Joshi, Mona Singh in leading roles along with Mikhail Gandhi, Tejasvi Singh Ahlawat and Vivan Bhatena. It is an official adaption of the 2019 British miniseries Dark Money.

The show is released on Sony LIV on 23 June 2023.

== Cast ==
- Mona Singh as Seema Vashisht
- Sharman Joshi as Raghav Vashisht
- Preeti Jhangiani as Tanya Bajaj
- Vivan Bhatena as Vikram Bajaj
- Zarina Wahab as Neelima
- Mona Vasu as Meghna
- Mukesh Chhabra as Irfan Akhtar
- Mikhail Gandhi as Sunny Vashisht
- Tejasvi Singh Ahlawat as Shreya Vashisht
- Jyoti Gauba as Deepali Guha
- Geetanjali Mishra as Priya
- Araham Sawant as Yash Vashisht
- Ethan Manjani as Agastya Bajaj

== Synopsis ==
Kafas is a gripping tale of power and privilege trampling over truth and justice. It is a journey of a middle-class family that rejoices when their son acquires a once-in-a-lifetime career opportunity until a haunting reality hits them, leaving them to navigate the grounds of morality and power. It is an exploration into the world of dark money, capturing the intricacies of human nature and the price we pay for our choices.

=== Episodic Synopsis ===
Episode 1

In Mumbai, Raghav and Seema Vashisht eagerly welcome their son Sunny back from his debut film shoot. However, something seems amiss, and at a surprise party, Sunny reveals a horrifying secret about the film's producer and actor, Vikram Bajaj.

Episode 2

Seeking legal advice, Raghav and Seema are discouraged from taking action against Vikram Bajaj due to the exorbitant costs and slim chances of winning. Later, the Vashishts are coerced by Vikram's legal team, who offer a settlement of a huge amount in exchange for their silence.

Episode 3

Raghav avoids questions from journalist Irfan Akhtar, fearing to break the agreement. Vikram plans to launch the film trailer without inviting Sunny. Meanwhile, Sunny becomes a part of an uncomfortable WhatsApp chat group with his school friends and later, accepts Agastya's invitation, only to encounter Vikram Bajaj.

Episode 4

Sunny confronts Vikram Bajaj, gets intimidated, and runs away. Shreya learns about the secret and decides to take matters in her own hands. Sunny’s erratic behaviour creates new problems for him at school. Meanwhile, Raghav seeks solace with Meghna.

Episode 5

The Vashishts receive a call from Vikram Bajaj's manager, demanding Sunny's appearance on a live TV show. Shreya is seeking justice as she anonymously reaches out to journalist Irfan Akhtar. Suddenly, an article surfaces, causing turmoil.

Episode 6

Seema and Raghav rush to the hospital in time and Sunny recovers. Meanwhile, Vikram's legal team pressures the Vashishts to defend him at a press conference for their official statement. What will the Vashishts’ do?

== Reception ==
Archika Khurana of The Times of India gave 3 stars out of 5. she said The setting of a middle-class family becomes a character in its own right, enhancing the nature of the show’s storyline. While the plot may offer mild unpredictability, it effectively keeps viewers invested in the overall story of child abuse. In a nutshell, ‘Kafas’ may not be the apex of OTT offerings, but holds its own with engaging performances and intriguing execution.
