= Oops Ab Kya? =

2025 Indian comedy-drama television series

- Genre: Comedy-drama, Romantic comedy
- Based on: Juana la virgen by Perla Farías; Jane the Virgin by Jennie Snyder Urman
- Country of origin: India
- Original language: Hindi
- No. of seasons: 1
- No. of episodes: 8

Production
- Production company: Dice Media

Original release
- Network: Disney+ Hotstar
- Release: February 20, 2025

Oops Ab Kya? is an Indian Hindi-language comedy-drama streaming television series directed by Prem Mistry and Debatma Mandal for Disney+ Hotstar.

It is the official Indian adaptation of the American series Jane the Virgin, which itself was based on the Venezuelan telenovela Juana la virgen.

The series stars Shweta Basu Prasad as a young woman who becomes pregnant through accidental artificial insemination.

It premiered on 20 February 2025.

== Premise ==
Roohi Jani, a young woman committed to remaining a virgin until marriage due to her grandmother's traditional upbringing, has her life upended when she is accidentally artificially inseminated during a routine check-up. The biological father is Samar Pratap Singh, her employer and a former crush. Roohi must navigate her unexpected pregnancy while managing her relationship with her fiancé, Omkar, and the conflicting expectations of three generations of women in her family.

== Cast and characters ==
- Shweta Basu Prasad as Roohi Jani
- Aashim Gulati as Samar Pratap Singh
- Abhay Mahajan as Omkar Jadhav
- Sonali Kulkarni as Paakhi Jani, Roohi's mother
- Apara Mehta as Subhadra Jani, Roohi's grandmother
- Jaaved Jaaferi as Vanraj Kapoor
- Amy Aela as Alisha Singh
- Rohit Varghese as the Narrator (voice)

== Reception ==
The series received generally positive reviews for its performances, though some critics felt the condensed eight-episode format was rushed compared to the original 22-episode seasons of Jane the Virgin.

The Times of India gave the series 3 out of 5 stars, calling it a "pot-pourri of emotional highs and lows" and praising the performances.

Scroll.in noted that the series "rolls out ample distractions from its archaic views on sex" and highlighted Shweta Basu Prasad's performance.

OTTPlay described it as "effortlessly bingeable," noting the combination of traditional television style with contemporary dialogue.

Hollywood Reporter India called it a "watchable but uninspired remake," stating that it "loses its bite in translation."
