= Dil Dosti Duniyadari =

Indian television sitcom

- Also known as: 3D
- Genre: Sitcom
- Created by: Sanjay Jadhav; Ashish Pathare
- Written by: Manaswini Lata Ravindra
- Screenplay by: Ashish Pathare
- Story by: Sanjay Jadhav
- Directed by: Vinod Lavhekar
- Starring: See below
- Country of origin: India
- Original language: Marathi
- No. of episodes: 301

Production
- Producers: Sanjay Jadhav; Deepak Rane
- Camera setup: Multi-camera
- Running time: 22 minutes
- Production company: Dreaming 24/7 Productions

Original release
- Network: Zee Marathi
- Release: 9 March 2015 – 20 February 2016

Related
- Dil Dosti Dobara

Dil Dosti Duniyadari is a Marathi television sitcom produced by Sanjay Jadhav and Deepak Rane. It started airing on Zee Marathi from 9 March 2015. It revolves around six friends living as paying guests in Mumbai with the home owner's nephew Sujay, in a house they affectionately call "Mazghar". The serial's first season concluded on 20 February 2016. The series second season, Dil Dosti Dobara, was a reboot sequel.

== Premise ==
Dil Dosti Duniyadari is a journey of six friends, all of different shades and colours. Meenal, Sujay, Kaivalya, Anna, Ashutosh and Reshma not only share the same flat but also share their lives with each other. All of them have come to Mumbai with a reason of their own. When destiny brings them together, it becomes a mad man’s world to live in. Each day brings about a new set of fun-filled expeditions for them. No matter how bad the situation is they always stand by each other. The life in this house is no less than a roller coaster ride of emotions. These six individuals have now found family away from family. From here, begins a journey of evolving relationships, changing dreams, heartbreaks, and countless moments of pain and joy. But most of all, an unending journey of lifelong friendship.

== Plot ==
The plot of the Dil Dosti Duniyadari serial begins with a newly married Reshma who leaves her home in Akola to settle with her husband Rakesh. When she reaches Mumbai, she is heartbroken when she finds out that Rakesh has a girlfriend and was married to her unwillingly, upon receiving threats from his father. Reshma leaves the house and does not know what to do with her dreams crushed.

Another girl, Meenal, discovers Reshma abandoned and befriends her. She introduces Reshma to her flatmates. Initially, they are reluctant to receive her, but soon bond with her mainly because Reshma is a talented cook. The story showcases the friends in various situations, exploring their emotions to the fullest extent, and each one learns something new about life. Reshma changes as her friends teach her to live life full of freedom. Reshma and her friends decide not to tell her family the truth, at least until Reva, her younger sister, is married. Rakesh comes to respect Reshma.

The show concludes when Reshma, Rakesh, Nisha, and their friends reach Akola to attend Reva's marriage. When the marriage is done, Reshma and her friends reveal the truth in front of everyone. Rakesh's father threatens his son to abandon Nisha, but Rakesh, who is also influenced by Reshma's friends, no longer buckles and strongly asserts himself. Reshma tells the truth to her parents, who understand her. Reshma father asks her to stay with him. The friends become emotional when they come to know that Reshma will not be returning with them, who parts ways with her. Reshma reunites with her friends, saying that she would be starting a new life with them, with her father's permission. The friends become overjoyed and enjoy each other's company. The final scene is when all six friends happily step on the platform of Dadar Station in Mumbai.

== Cast ==
=== Main ===
- Suvrat Joshi as Sujay Sathe (Scholar) - A scholarly intellectual who works in an IT corporate sector and has migrated from Pune. Sujay is the 'know-it-all' of the house as well as the second eldest member of Mazghar. He is very strict about manners, money, and discipline, but at the same time, he cares for all his friends and stands with them in need. He has a sister Piyu, who has schizophrenia, because of which he is overprotective of her. The house, Mazghar, in which all the friends live, is his Kaka's investment flat.
- Amey Wagh as Kaivalya Karkhanis (KK) - A boy from a rich business family who has fled from there to pursue his dreams. He aspires to be a great singer and music composer one day and wants to show his father the real worth of music. Kaivalya is as proud as a peacock, and has a sarcastic sense of humour but is willing to undertake any task for his friends. Piyu had a crush on him. Kaivalya has a strained relationship with his businessman father, Vasant Karkhanis. However, Vasant reconciles with his son and allows him to live life the way he wants. Also Kaivalya is the only one in "Mazghar" who knows about Aashu's criminal past.
- Pushkaraj Chirputkar as Aashutosh Shivalkar (Aashu, Bunny) - An unemployed youngster who hails from Yavatmal, he's the eldest member of "Mazghar". He works as a clown for a party organizer to earn his livelihood. Kinjal is the love of his life, who is Gujarati. He always borrows money from his friends and other people, and never repays them. He speaks poor English but tries hard to learn. He is the butt of the jokes and is considered goofy and cowardly. But despite his lighthearted surface, he hides a very dark past. He is a former dreaded gangster who worked in the mafia, but he grew disgusted with these criminal activities and decided to redeem himself. He often tells stories of his childhood friend Pamya and forgets each time that he has told everyone about Pamya.
- Pooja Thombre as Anna Mathews - A Catholic girl who is originally from Vasai and works in the fashion industry. She is innocent and naive, being the youngest of all tenants, due to which she is a soft target for others to ridicule. She had a sad childhood with quarrelling parents. Her parents don't believe in her ambition, regardless of which she is working her way out to prove herself to her family and live her dreams.
- Swanandi Tikekar as Meenal Shevale - A headstrong girl who has left her home in Kolhapur to become an actress. She is a very open-minded girl and is quite confident about herself. She depicts an independent and opinionated twenty-first-century city girl. Although she presents herself as strong and confident, she carries the grief of having been neglected, along with her three younger sisters, by their chauvinistic father. This experience shaped her into a fiercely independent radical feminist. During her work on a play, she fell in love with its director, Kabir, only to face heartbreak when he eloped with the woman he had truly loved all along.
- Sakhi Gokhale as Reshma Rakesh Inamdar (Patil) - She is the newest and only married member of "Mazghar". A young housewife from Akola who comes to stay with the others after realising that her husband has married her only for pleasing his strict father, and therefore material gain. In reality, he secretly loves a North Indian girl called Nisha. Dismal and heartbroken, she starts living with the other tenants. With her new friends, she uncovers various aspects of life that she never encountered. She is a talented cook and Aashu considers her as a sister. She has also pursued a masters degree in English language and used to write short stories before marriage which had even been selected for a competition in Edinburgh. However, she chose to prioritise her marriage over her writing career.

=== Recurring ===
- Pankaj Khamkar as Rakesh Jagannath Inamdar - Reshma's estranged husband, also from Akola. He is blackmailed by his father, Jagannath Inamdar, that he can only marry a woman of his Baba's choice, or any other Maharashtrian woman. If he disobeyed, his father would refuse to give him property for his married life. So Jagannath arranges his son's marriage to a girl called Reshma Patil who happens to be in the same city and arranges property for both to live in Mumbai. However, Jagannath nor Reshma have any idea that Rakesh is cheating them by having secret extramarital affairs with a North Indian girl called Nisha. Rakesh is very intelligent, rich, and good at his work, but as a person very selfish, greedy, materialistic, and inconsiderate with Reshma. She believes that Rakesh would finally realize his mistake and come back to her, but her roommates loathe and disdain him. Nevertheless, they still tolerate his antics by never closing the door on Rakesh whenever he comes to Mazghar to visit his wife. Rakesh fears Aashutosh the most, as he once beat him up and hung him upside down a ceiling fan when he berated Reshma. Reshma gives up on Rakesh eventually and accepts him as a platonic friend.
- Kiran Nivalkar as Sam - Owner of a food joint and is a friend of the tenants. He has a crush on Pragalbha. His dreams of living his life with Pragalbha are finally fulfilled nearing the end of the series when Kaivalya's tricks make her fall in love with Sam.
- Suvedha Desai as Kinjal - Aashu's English tutor and his love interest. She is a Gujarati.
- Rucha Apte as Supriya Sathe (Piyu) - Sujay's younger sister who has a crush on Kaivalya. She was hidden by Sujay on the grounds that she had a severe mental illness but later revealed. Sujay lovingly calls her bachcha. Doctors confirm that Piyu will gradually recover from her mental condition and return to normal. She is the only one around whom Sujay behaves like a child.
- Shweta Ambikar as Reva Patil - Reshma's younger sister who lives in Akola with her parents. She later marries her boyfriend Ketan.
- Rasika Vengurlekar as Pragalbha Nagaonkar - Daughter of the society's strict secretary Mr. Nagaonkar. She is eccentric and aberrant who frequently changes her love interest from Sujay and Kaivalya, none of which is actually true. In the end, she ended up starting a true relationship with Sam.
- Manjiri Pupala as Nisha - A cool and collected North Indian girl, she is Rakesh's love and girlfriend whom he lives with. Jagannath refuses to give property to Rakesh if he marries someone 'off-limits', therefore he doesn't marry her and Reshma instead.
- Nikam Ajji - Their amiable next door neighbor Ajji who pays them occasional visits. She possesses sharp wit, kindness and is young at heart. She is fond of acting, old songs and shayaris. She taught Kaivalya to make pithla.
- Anushka (Anu) - Nikam Ajji's granddaughter, full of mischief and has a keen interest in the internet and electronics.
- Malu Kaku - Meenal's neighbour of her childhood home.
- Pradnesh - The neighbor next door, who has a personality similar to Sujay, is a student and occasionally visits them.
- Mansi Vahini - Nikam Ajji's daughter-in-law and Anushka's mother, a delightful and warm-hearted individual, is consistently occupied yet finds time to seek assistance from Mazghar for English-related matters. She encourages the members to initiate English Speaking Classes, showcasing her amiable and sweet nature, characteristic of a typical Maharashtrian neighbor.
- Lalit Prabhakar as Kabir - A play director who casts Meenal in his plays. He is stern and frequently reprimands Meenal for her inability to cry during sad scenes, therefore the inability to act well. Meenal falls in love with him later, but Kabir is actually married.
- Sayali Phatak as Chinmayee Chaudhari (Chinu) - Meenal's friend. She hails from Dhule and wants to be a filmmaker. The roomies helped her to make a documentary on bachelors living in Mumbai. She halted in Mazghar for a week for her college submission of the same documentary.
- Atul Kasava as Mr. Nagaonkar - The grumpy and sarcastic secretary of the housing society who views strange and unusual situations with a strong cynical eye.

== Awards ==
Zee Marathi Utsav Natyancha Awards 2015
Category	Role	Recipient
Best Siblings	Ashutosh-Reshma	Pushkaraj Chirputkar-Sakhi Gokhale
Best Family	Majghar Family	
Best Title Song		

=== Special episode (1 hour) ===
- 22 March 2015
