= Dekh Tamasha Dekh =

- DVD Cover
- Directed by: Feroz Abbas Khan
- Written by: Shafaat Khan
- Produced by: Feroz Abbas Khan; Sunil Lulla
- Starring: Satish Kaushik; Tanvi Azmi; Vinay Jain
- Cinematography: Hemant Chaturvedi
- Edited by: A. Sreekar Prasad
- Production companies: Eros International; Bombay Local Pictures
- Release date: 18 April 2014
- Running time: 110 minutes
- Country: India
- Language: Hindi

Dekh Tamasha Dekh (transl. Do watch the spectacle) is a 2014 Indian Hindi-language social and political satire film about a true incident. It revolves around the search for the religious identity of a poor man crushed under the weight of a politician's hoarding. The film explores an impossible India where bizarreness is normal.

== Plot ==
Inspired by a true incident, the film starts when an underprivileged man gets crushed under the weight of a politician's poster. The film gets into the mood immediately after the man dies. The story gets to a climax as the judge tries to get into the details of the man's death, the lawyers of the parties argue the case, and it sparks communal riots. The deceased, who was a Hindu by birth, converted to Islam. His death gives rise to a religious spark between the two religious factions, who want his body to be burned and buried, respectively.

== Cast ==
- Satish Kaushik as Muthaseth
- Tanvi Azmi as Fatima
- Vinay Jain as Vishwasrao
- Sharad Ponkshe as Bawderkar
- Ganesh Yadav as Inspector Sawant
- Santosh Juvekar as Badshah
- Apoorva Arora as Shabbo
- Alok Rajwade as Prashant
- Satish Alekar as Professor Shastri
- Jaywant Wadka as Sattar
- Dhiresh Josh as Kulkarni
- Spruha Joshi as Rafiq's wife

== Soundtrack ==
Dekh Tamasha Dekh

Soundtrack album by Baylon Fonseca
- Genre: Feature film soundtrack
- Length: 12:23
- Label: Eros International

Track listing
No.	Title	Singer(s)	Length
1.	"Shana Waleya"	Arif Lohar	4:19
2.	"Shana Waleya (Duet)"	Arif Lohar & Sanam Marvi	4:19
3.	"Shana Waleya (Remix)"	Arif Lohar & Sanam Marwi	3:45
Total length:			12:23

== Reception ==
This Film got some average Reviews. Madhureeta Mukherjee from Times of India gave it 3 out of 5 stars and wrote, "The film often rolls out like a play or a social commentary with staged events (often over-stretched) that result in an abrupt narrative. The stark portrayal of bare-faced reality (devoid of background music) with a cast of commoners - gives it a docu-drama flavour. 'DTD' is 'grave' alright, but offers hilarity in decent doses." Subhash K. Jha of IANS gave it 4 out of 5, "By using the twin missiles of satire and irony, he brings into a play a kind of pinned-down provocativeness into the plot whereby the characters become real and representational simultaneously." and added,"To record the dirt on the wall and the blood on the floor with such clarity and honesty is not within the creative powers of every filmmaker." Shubhra Gupta of Indian Express, who gave 3 out of 5 stars, explained, "Khan's film gets into theatrical territory every once in a while, but there is no denying its terrifying power. He pulls no punches, and paints extremism from both sides equally black." and suggested, "This is an important film, and I do hope it gets seen widely, timely and topical as it is in the time of Muzzafarnagar, misguided mullahs and modified bhakts."

== Awards and nominations ==
Award	Category	Recipients and nominees	Result	Ref.
7th Mirchi Music Awards	Song representing Sufi tradition	"Shana Waleya"	Won	
