= Sakhi Gokhale =

Indian actress (born 1993)

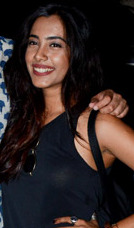
- Gokhale in 2017
- Born: 27 July 1993 (age 33); Pune, Maharashtra
- Education: Royal College of Art
- Occupations: Actor; photographer
- Years active: 2013–present
- Height: 5 ft 4 in (163 cm)
- Spouse: Suvrat Joshi (m. 2019)
- Parent(s): Mohan Gokhale; Shubhangi Gokhale

Sakhi Gokhale (born 27 July 1993) is a Marathi television and theatre actress. She is known for her portrayal in Dil Dosti Duniyadari as Reshma Inamdar and Dil Dosti Dobara as Pari.

== Early life and education ==
Gokhale attended Sahyadri School until grade 10. She later pursued a Bachelor of Arts at Ruparel College. She also has an interest in dancing and has attended workshops by Shiamak Davar. Her mother gifted her a DSLR after she finished her school education, which cultivated in her an interest in still photography. She then pursued a degree in Fashion and Fine Arts Photography from Bharti Vidyapeeth's School of Photography, Pune, going on to intern as a photographer under the guidance of Jaideep Oberoi, before getting into acting.

As of July 2018, she was pursuing a master's degree in Art Curation in the UK at the Royal College of Art.

== Career ==
Gokhale began her television career by appearing in a few Hindi advertisements. She played a small role, Venu, in the Hindi movie, Rangrezz in 2013. She was also part of a one-act play before being cast as Reshma Inamdar in Dil Dosti Duniyadari. After the show ended, she was also seen in the theatrical play, Amar Photo Studio. She was awarded Fresh Face of the Year by Maharashtra Times in 2017. She was also part of the reboot sequel to Dil Dosti Duniyadari, Dil Dosti Dobara as Pari, along with the old cast. She also played the role of Seema in Pimpal (2017). She has also written articles in Maitrin for the newspaper Sakal Pune. She has also done still photography for the poster of the play Laginghai.

In 2020, she was appointed as Creative Director at Aayaam, a concept alternative arts venue in Pune.

== Personal life ==
Sakhi Gokhale is the daughter of actors Mohan Gokhale and Shubhangi Gokhale. She is very close to her mother. She married her Dil Dosti Duniyadari co-star, Suvrat Joshi, on 11 April 2019.

== Filmography ==
=== Films ===
Year	Title	Role	Language	Ref.
2013	Rangrezz	Venu	Hindi	
2017	Pimpal	Seema	Marathi	
2021	Befaam	RJ Nandita	Marathi	
2021	Godavari	Nishikant's Sister	Marathi	
2021	Shantit Kranti	Rupali	Marathi	
2022	Dil Dimaag Aur Batti	Laxmi	Marathi	
2026	Adkitta	Kasturi	Marathi	
2026	Aadi Anant	Gayatri Deshmukh	Marathi	

=== Television ===
Year	Title	Role	Channel	Ref.
2015-2016	Dil Dosti Duniyadari	Reshma Inamdar	Zee Marathi	
2017	Dil Dosti Dobara	Pari	Zee Marathi	
2020	Aaathshe Khidkya Naushe Daare	Paree Saave	Sony Marathi	

=== Plays ===
- Varvarche Vadhu Var
