= Mrinal Dutt =

Indian television actor

- Born: 1988 or 1989 (age 37–38); Delhi, India
- Education: Zakir Hussain College, University of Delhi
- Occupations: Actor; model
- Years active: 2009-present

Mrinal Dutt is an Indian actor who primarily works in Hindi films and Hindi television along with web shows. He made his acting debut with Roomies in 2009 and had his breakthrough with Private Investigator. He made his film debut with Tuneega Tuneega in 2012. Dutt hosted Yeh Hai Aashiqui in 2016.

Dutt made his web debut in 2018 with 13 Mussoorie and has been part of many web shows including Hello Mini, His Storyy and Khwabon Ke Parindey. Dutt has also appeared in short films, 55 km/sec and The Lonely Prince.

== Early life ==
Dutt was born and brought up in Delhi. He completed his graduation from Zakir Hussain College, University of Delhi.

== Career ==
Dutt started his acting career with small roles in South Indian films like Telugu film Tuneega Tuneega in 2012. In 2013, he played the role of Vikrant in the teenage drama series MTV Webbed, which was produced by Balaji Telefilms. The following year in 2014, he received his first lead role in the series Private Investigator. In character of Raffe Roy Choudhary, Dutt was a college-going teenager who helped a police inspector (played by Vrajesh Hirjee) to solve crimes. He would solve crimes by his keen observation of people and based on Sourabh Ratnu's advice, who had conceptualized the show, Dutt travelled to many common places simply to study and observe mannerisms and behaviour of people. Dutt had himself styled his character, making him look younger, by wearing t-shirts and losing muscle weight by running and playing badminton. Media had speculated that his appearance in the show, especially hair, had been inspired from Benedict Cumberbatch; Dutt called it "just a coincidence, and a good one."

In 2015, Dutt appeared in various episodic roles of Season 3 of the relationship-based show Yeh Hai Aashiqui on Bindass channel. In season 4, the show which was aired weekly, changed to a daily show and Dutt took on the role of host. In 2017, he featured in the short-film A Moment that was conceptualized by him and the director Rohit James. The short-film had featured in Brooklyn Film Festival. In 2019, he played the side role in the web series Coldd Lassi Aur Chicken Masala which was produced by ALTBalaji and directed by Pradeep Sarkar. The story revolved around the romantically complex relationship of two chefs who were married earlier. Dutt's role was of a playboy lover who was dating sous chef played by Madhu Sneha.

From 2019 onwards, Dutt featured in three seasons of romantic-thriller web series Hello Mini streaming on MX Player. The series is based on The Stranger Trilogy written by Novoneel Chakraborty. Dutt plays the love interest of the titular character (Rivanah Bannerjee) played by Anuja Joshi.

In 2020, Dutt featured in a short sci-fi film titled 55 km/sec, directed by Arati Kadav. The plot is about a loner man Sooraj (played by Dutt) in a world awaiting doomsday as an asteroid is about to hit the earth. His college friends arrange a video call where he sees Srishti (played by Richa Chadda), his long-time crush and he confesses his love, unafraid of any consequences. Due to COVID-19 lockdown in India, the film was directed remotely where the lead actors Dutt and Chadda had to set up their own frames using their own devices for the shooting. The film was released on Hotstar and Amazon Prime.

In 2021, he played the role of Preet, a homosexual man in love with a married man (played by Satyadeep Mishra), in the web series His Storyy. Dutt claimed that he found the role challenging and was excited about it. In June 2021, his web series Khwabon Ke Parindey aired on Voot which starred Asha Negi and Manasi Moghe. Dutt played role of Dixit, who is set on a road trip with his friends from Melbourne to Perth. The series was shot at 12 different locations in Australia within 40 days.

== Filmography ==
=== Films ===
Key
†	Denotes films that have not yet been released

Year	Title	Role	Notes	Ref.
2012	Tuneega Tuneega	Rahul	Telugu film	
2014	Katputliwala	Ghanshyam	Short film	
2017	A Moment	Mrinal	Short film	
2019	Upstarts	Ravi Bansal	Netflix film	
2020	55 km/sec	Suraj	Hotstar & Amazon Prime short film	
2020	The Lonely Prince	Prince	Short film	
2023	Ishq-e-Nadaan	Raghav	JioCinema	
2024	Swatantra Veer Savarkar	Madan Lal Dhingra	Zee Cinema	

=== Television ===
Year	Title	Role	Notes	Ref.
2009	Roomies	Mrinal	Debut show	
2009	Kitani Mohabbat Hai	Aman Mittal		
2013	MTV Webbed	Vikrant 'Viku' Chaudhary	Episode: "Showoffs Get Shutdown!"	
2014-15	Private Investigator	Raffe Roy Choudhary		
2016	Yeh Hai Aashiqui	Host		
2016	Yeh Hai Aashiqui	Yuraj	Episode: "Vote For Love"	
2017	MTV Big F 2	Akshay	Episode: "Forbidden No More"	

=== Web series ===
Year	Title	Role	Platform	Notes	Ref.
2018	13 Mussoorie	Ishaan Saini	Viu	Debut series	
2019	Medically Yourrs	Akshay	ALTBalaji		
2019	Hello Mini	Danny Abraham	MX Player	Season 1	
2019	Coldd Lassi Aur Chicken Masala	Kayzad Sonawala	ALTBalaji, Zee5		
2020	Pawan & Pooja	Raj	MX Player		
2020	Butterflies	Yash	Terribly Tiny Tales	mini-series	
2021	Hello Mini	Danny Abraham	MX Player	Season 2 & 3	
2021	His Storyy	Preet	ALTBalaji, Zee5		
2021	Khwabon Ke Parindey	Dixit	Voot		
2021	Cartel	Yograj	ALT Balaji		
2023	Ishq Next Door	Ashwin	JioCinema		

=== Music videos ===
Year	Title	Singer(s)	Label	Ref.
2020	Baat Kar	Inderpreet Singh	Faridkot	
2021	Mera Pehla Pyaar	Nikhita Gandhi, Javed Ali	Glam Angel Studio	
