= Alok Rajwade =

Indian actor

- Born: 7 February 1989 (age 37); Pune, Maharashtra, India
- Education: Brihan Maharashtra College of Commerce
- Occupations: Actor; writer; director
- Spouse: Parna Pethe (m. 2016)

Alok Rajwade (born 7 February 1989) is an Indian actor, director, singer and painter. He has appeared in Marathi and Hindi films and experimental plays.

== Early life ==
Rajwade was born and raised in Pune, where he attended Aksharnandan school. He went on to join Brihan Maharashtra College of Commerce for a Bachelor of Commerce degree. He completed his M.A. in Sociology from the University of Pune. He was part of various theatre troupes like Aasakta Kalamanch and Samanvay. He was a founding member of the theatre troupe Natak Company, in 2008. He directed and acted in various plays for Natak Company.

== Career ==
Rajwade's first major play was in Abhraham Lincolnche Patra (a Marathi Adaptation of Abraham Lincoln's Letter) by an organisation named Jagar. In 2008, he starred in the Bhojpuri film, Udedh Bun. In 2009, he was part of the critically acclaimed movie Vihir. In 2010, he wrote a play titled Geli Ekvis Varsha (which was directed by him as well) which was performed at Italy's Universo Teatro. In 2012, Rajwade was seen in Ha Bharat Maza. He was greatly appreciated for his roles in Rajwade and & Sons (2014) and Rama Madhav (2014). In the same year, he was also seen in the Hindi movie Dekh Tamasha Dekh, portraying the role of Prashant.

In 2017, he was featured on Forbes India's 30 under 30 list. Alok Rajwade also won the Best Actor Award at the BRICS Film Festival-2017 held in China that year for his movie Kaasav. In 2018, he made his directorial debut in Marathi movies through Ashleel Udyog Mitramandal, written by Dharmakirti Sumant. In the same year, he was also part of the movie Dear Molly which was selected for the Academy Awards. He directed the play, A Doubtful Gaze at Uber at Midnight, which was staged at Serendipity Arts Festival 2018, in Goa.

He also features in Bharatiya Digital Party short video series Aai Ani Me, in which he plays Aniruddha aka Ani along with Renuka Daftardar(Aai) and Mrinmayee Godbole(Jui).

In 2019, he was a co-host of the series titled Safe Journeys. Rajwade was also awarded the Balasaheb Sarpotdar Award by his alma mater, Brihan Maharashtra College of Commerce.

== Filmography ==
All films are in Marathi, unless mentioned.

=== Films ===
Year	Title	Role	Notes
2008	Udedh Bun	Ashu	Bhojpuri Short Film
2009	Bokya Satbande	Vijayendra Satbande	Film debut
2009	Vihir	Nachiket	
2012	Chintoo	Satish Dada	
2012	Ha Bharat Maza		
2013	Kaatal	Aakash	
2014	Rama Madhav	Madhavrao Peshwe	
2014	Dekh Tamasha Dekh	Prashant	Hindi film
2014	Rajwade and Sons	Anay Rajwade	
2016	Family Katta	Siddharth	
2017	Kaasav	Manav	
2017	Pimpal	Young Arvind	
2018	Ashleel Udyog Mitramandal		Directorial Debut
2018	Dear Molly	Father	Hindi/English film
2022	Me Vasantrao	Vasantrao's Mama	
2023	Teen Adkun Sitaram	Kautilya	
2026	Macho		

=== Plays ===
Year	Title	Role	Language	Refs
2007	Jhoom Barabar Jhoom	Actor	Hindi	
2008	Bed ke Neeche Rehne Wali	Actor	Hindi	
2009	Dalan	Actor	Marathi	
2010	Institute of Pavtalogy	Director	Marathi	
2010	Tichee Satra Prakarna	Director	Marathi	
2010	Geli Ekvees Varsha	Director/Writer	Marathi	
2010	Don Shoor	Director	Marathi	
2011	Dil-e-Naadan	Director	Urdu	
2012	Natak Nako	Director	Marathi	
2013	Shivcharitra ani Ek	Director	Marathi	
2013	Mi Ghalib	Director	Marathi	
2013	Aashadatil Ek Divas	Actor	Marathi	
2014	Binkamache Sanwad	Director	Marathi	
2016	Sindhu Sudhakar Rum Aani Ittar	Director	Marathi	
2018	A Doubtful Gaze at Uber at Midnight	Director		
2022	Prasthan urph exit	Director	Marathi	

=== Web-Series ===
Year	Title	Role	Language
2018	Aai Ani Mi	Ani	Marathi
2021	Shantit Kranti	Dinar	Marathi
2021	Hing Pustak Talwaar	Pandey	Marathi
2022	9 to 5	Avinash	Marathi
2023	Shantit Kranti 2	Dinar	Marathi

== Personal life ==
He dated Parna Pethe before tying the knot on 29 February 2016. They had a court marriage at Mangal Karyalay, Pune.
