= Amey Wagh =

Indian actor (born 1988)

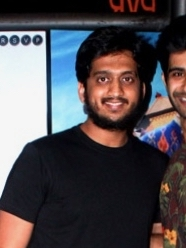
- Wagh in 2018.
- Born: 13 November 1988 (age 37); Pune, Maharashtra, India
- Education: Brihan Maharashtra College of Commerce
- Occupation: Actor
- Years active: 2011–present
- Notable work: Dil Dosti Duniyadari; Dil Dosti Dobara; Faster Fene; Amar Photo Studio
- Height: 5 ft 5 in (165 cm)
- Spouse: Sajiri Deshpande (m. 2017)

Amey Wagh (born 13 November 1988) is an Indian actor known for his work in Marathi films such as Popat, Faster Fene, Muramba, Girlfriend. He was recently seen portraying Kushal in season 2 of Sacred Games and Balvir Subeir in Asur- Welcome to Your Dark Side and Asur 2. He is received numerous accolades including two Maharashtra State Film Awards and a Filmfare Award Marathi.

== Early life ==
Wagh was born on 13 November 1988 in Pune, Maharashtra. He studied in Brihan Maharashtra College of Commerce, Pune. He began actively participating in play competitions since he began college. He lived in a joint family in Pune, consisting of around 65 members. His family was in the transport business.

== Personal life ==
He was in a relationship with Sajiri Deshpande for 13 years before eventually marrying her on 2 July 2017 at Shrutimangal, Pune.

== Media image ==
Most Desirable Men of Maharashtra
Sponsor	Year	Rank	
Sponsor	Year	Film	Ref.
The Times of India, Maharashtra Times	2017	10	
The Times of India, Maharashtra Times	2018	5	
The Times of India, Maharashtra Times	2019	23	
The Times of India, Maharashtra Times	2020	20	

=== Philanthropy ===
He, along with Sunil Barve, donated the money from two shows of Amar Photo Studio to Chief Minister's Relief Fund in 2018.

== Career ==
Wagh is part of the theatre troupe, Natak Company. He auditioned for the role of Chatur in 3 Idiots (2009) but was rejected. He made his Bollywood debut in 2012 through the movie, Aiyyaa, where he played Nana. He made his marathi film debut through Sangeeta Pusalkar's directorial, Aaicha Gondhal (2008), starring Kuldip Pawar, as his father and Nirmiti Sawant, as his mother. In 2014, he was in an English play titled The Government Inspector. In the same year he was also seen in Shutter (2014). He was also in the play Bombed in 2015. The Marathi play, Amar Photo Studio, had Wagh in a lead role. He also starred in two popular Marathi TV serials Dil Dosti Duniyadari and its sequel Dil Dosti Dobara. He also hosted Zee Marathi Awards 2015-Utsav Natyancha Aplya Maitricha along with Pushkaraj Chirputkar.

He hosted the show Super Dancer Maharashtra in 2018. He also co-hosted Jio Filmfare Awards Marathi 2018, alongside Suvrat Joshi. He is part of the YouTube channel Bharatiya Digital Party, where he hosts a celebrity talk show called Casting Couch with Amey & Nipun. He was ranked 5 in the Times of India-Pune's Most Desirable Men list in 2018. His movie, Girlfriend, has released in July 2019. He hosted the food show Mrs.Annapurna (2014) on ETV Marathi and the dance reality show 2 MAD (2017) on Colors Marathi. He has also acted in the movie Mee Vasantrao, which was releasing on 1 May 2020 but is postponed due to the lockdown in India.

== Filmography ==
=== Films ===
Key
†	Denotes films that have not yet been released

Year	Title	Role	Language	Notes
2008	Joshi Ki Kamble	Sanjay Kamble	Marathi	
2008	Aaicha Gondhal	Son of Village Head	Marathi	
2009	Billu	Modern Barber's Assistant	Hindi	
2009	Lagli Paij	Anand Gadgil	Marathi	
2010	Aiyyaa	Nana	Hindi	
2013	Popat	Raghu	Marathi	
2014	Shutter	Autorickshaw Driver	Marathi	
2016	Ghantaa	Raj	Marathi	
2017	Muramba	Alok	Marathi	
2017	Faster Fene	Banesh Fene(Banya)	Marathi	
2018	High Jack	ATC Junior Official	Hindi	
2019	Girlfriend	Nachiket	Marathi	
2020	Dhurala	Bhavajya	Marathi	
2021	Karkhanisanchi Waari	Om Kharkhanis	Marathi	
2022	Zombivli	Sudhir	Marathi	
2022	Govinda Naam Mera	Kaustubh Godbole	Hindi	
2022	Me Vasantrao	Deenanath Mangeshkar	Marathi	
2022	Ananya	Jay Dixit	Marathi	Nominated Zee Chitra Gaurav Puraskar for Best Supporting Actor
2023	Jaggu Ani Juliet	Jaggu	Marathi	Maharashtra State Film Award for Best Actor
2024	Ek Don Teen Chaar	-	Marathi	Special appearance
2024	Like Aani Subscribe	Rohidas Chavan / Rohit	Marathi	
2025	Fussclass Dabhade	Sonu	Marathi	
2025	Ambat Shaukin	Amey	Marathi	
2025	The Pet Detective	Psycho	Malayalam	
2026	Krantijyoti Vidyalay Marathi Madhyam	Baban Mhatre	Marathi	
2026	Frame	Siddharth Deshmukh	Marathi	Maharashtra State Film Award for Best Supporting Actor

=== Television ===
Year	Title	Role	Notes	Refs
2015 - 2016	Dil Dosti Duniyadari	Kaivalya Karkhanis	Sitcom	
2017	Dil Dosti Dobara	Sahil Pradhan		
2016	Casting Couch with Amey & Nipun	Host	Webseries	
2017	Boygiri	Bajirao Ghadigoankar	Webseries	
2019	Sacred Games 2	Khushal	Netflix Original Series	
2020	Brochara	Pampu	Dice Media	
2020	Asur	Balvir Subeir	Voot Select Original Series	
2021	Cartel	Dhawal	Sony Liv	
2021	Bigg Boss Marathi 3	Guest	Reality Show	
2022	The Great Indian Murder	Arun Deshmukh	Disney+ Hotstar	
2023	Kaala Paani	ACP Ketan Kamat	Netflix	
2024	Sadhi Manasa	Prashant Dabhade (Episode 275) (Special Appearance)	Star Pravah	

=== Plays ===
- Amar Photo Studio
- Bombed
- Cycle
- Dalan
- Geli Ekvees Varsha
- The Government Inspector
- Katyar Kaljat Ghusali
- Natasamrat (old)
- Never Mind

== Accolades ==
He was awarded Vinod Doshi fellowship in performing arts in 2015. He won the award for Best Actor in a Leading Role (male) in the Filmfare Awards Marathi 2018, for Muramba.

- Winner Maharashtra State Film Award for Best Actor for Jaggu Ani Juliet (2025)
- Winner Filmfare Award for Best Actor – Marathi for Faster Fene.
- Nominated Filmfare Award for Best Actor – Marathi for Jaggu Ani Juliet.
- Nominated Filmfare Award for Best Actor – Marathi for Girlfriend.
- Nominated Filmfare Award for Best Supporting Actor – Marathi for Karkhanisanchi Waari.
- Nominated Zee Chitra Gaurav Puraskar for Best Actor for Faster Fene.
- Nominated Zee Chitra Gaurav Puraskar for Best Actor for Girlfriend.
