= Sonali Kulkarni filmography =

Filmography of Indian actress

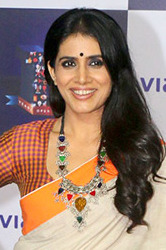
Kulkarni in 2017

Indian actress Sonali Kulkarni made her screen debut in 1992 with Girish Karnad's Hindi film Cheluvi, and soon entered Marathi cinema with Jabbar Patel's Mukta (1994). Throughout the 1990s, she balanced film and television, delivering notable early performances in the award-winning Doghi (1995), Amol Palekar’s internationally acclaimed Daayraa (1996), and the political drama Gharabaher (1999). Kulkarni gained wider recognition with Vidhu Vinod Chopra's Mission Kashmir (2000), which brought her multiple Best Supporting Actress nominations, followed by successful roles in the romantic thriller Pyaar Tune Kya Kiya and Farhan Akhtar's coming-of-age film Dil Chahta Hai (both 2001). Though she experienced a few commercial failures thereafter, she continued to receive critical praise for her performances in Marathi cinema, including Chaitra (2002), Devrai (2004), and the 2005 Gujarati hit Love Is Blind, the first of which earned her a National Film Award Special Mention.

Kulkarni won Best Actress at the Milan International Film Festival for her performance in the Italian film Fuoco Su di Me. Her versatility was further evident in films such as Taxi No. 9211 (2006), Gandha (2009), Gabhricha Paus (2009), and Singham (2011). She earned significant acclaim for her roles in Deool (2011), in which she portrayed Vahini Saheb, the thriller Pune 52 (2013), and the Gujarati film The Good Road (2013), the first Gujarati feature to be selected as India's entry to the 86th Academy Awards. From the mid-2010s, Kulkarni delivered some of her most celebrated performances in Dr. Prakash Baba Amte – The Real Hero (2014), Kachcha Limboo (2017), and Gulabjaam (2018), earning multiple Filmfare Marathi Awards and Maharashtra State Film Awards.

In the 2020s, she continued working across films and web series, appearing in Pension (2021), Mumbai Diaries 26/11 (2021–present), The Whistleblower (2021), Dharavi Bank (2022), and Ticha Shahar Hona (2023). Her 2024 performance in the crime thriller Manvat Murders was highly praised and earned her the NDTV Marathi Entertainment Award for Best Actress.

== Films ==
Year	Title	Role	Language	Notes	Ref.
1992	Cheluvi	Cheluvi	Hindi		
1994	May Maadham	Sandhya	Tamil		
1994	Mukta	Mukta	Marathi		
1995	Gulabari	Gulabari	Hindi	Television film	
1995	Doghi	Krishna	Marathi		
1996	Daayraa	The Girl	Hindi		
1996	Vrindavan Film Studios	Radha	English		
1999	Jahan Tum Le Chalo	Namrata Shorey	Hindi		
1999	Gharabaher	Vasudha	Marathi		
1999	Kairee	Kamli's daughter	Marathi	Bilingual film	
1999	Kairee	Kamli's daughter	Hindi	Bilingual film	
2000	Mission Kashmir	Neelima Khan	Hindi		
2000	Dr. Babasaheb Ambedkar	Ramabai Ambedkar	English		
2001	Pyaar Tune Kya Kiya	Geeta Bhatt	Hindi		
2001	Dil Chahta Hai	Pooja	Hindi		
2001	Maya: The Reality	Maya	Hindi		
2002	Kitne Door Kitne Paas	Jaya Patel	Hindi		
2002	Chaitra	Krati	Marathi	Short film	
2002	Dil Vil Pyar Vyar	Gauri Shahapukar	Hindi		
2002	Junoon	Sonali	Hindi		
2002	Agni Varsha	Nittilai	Hindi		
2003	Danav	Lakshmi	Hindi		
2004	1:1.6 An Ode to Lost Love	Asha	English		
2004	Devrai	Seena	Marathi		
2004	White Rainbow	Priya Giri	Hindi		
2004	Bride & Prejudice	Chandra Lamba	English		
2004	Hanan	Devi Bhagwati / Pagli	Hindi		
2004	Silence Please... The Dressing Room	Aparna Sen	Hindi		
2005	Love Is Blind	Amisha	Gujarati		
2005	Dansh	Maria	Hindi		
2005	Fuoco su di me	Graziella	Italian		
2006	Adharm	Kuldeep's love interest	Hindi		
2006	Taxi Number 9211	Sunita Shastri	Hindi		
2006	Darna Zaroori Hai	Mrs. Talegaonkar	Hindi	Segment: "Accidents are Never Predicted"	
2006	I See You	Kuljeet	Hindi	Special appearance	
2006	Restaurant	Janhavi	Marathi		
2007	Brinda	Brinda	Marathi		
2007	Sakhi	Nishi Surve	Marathi		
2007	Strangers	Nandini Rai	Hindi		
2007	Ek Krantiveer: Vasudev Balwant Phadke	Bhawani	Marathi		
2008	Sirf	Namita	Hindi		
2008	Mumbai Cutting	Sona	Hindi	Segment: "Parcel"	
2008	Via Darjeeling	Rimli Sharma / Sangeeta	Hindi		
2009	Gulmohar	Vidya	Marathi		
2009	Gabhricha Paus	Alka	Marathi		
2009	Mohandas	Meghna	Hindi		
2009	Gandha	Raavi	Marathi	Segment: "Aushadh Ghenara Manus"	
2009	Tya Ratri Paus Hota	Gayatri	Marathi		
2009	Shadow	Inspector Sanjana Singh Rajpoot	Hindi		
2009	Love Khichdi	Shanta Bheemrao Bhansode	Hindi		
2009	Well Done Abba	Malti Jha	Hindi		
2010	Ringa Ringa	Mansi Nayak	Marathi		
2010	The Camp	Sonali Manthe	Hindi		
2011	Singham	Megha Kadam	Hindi		
2011	Deool	Vahini Saheb	Marathi		
2011	Pratibimba	Gauri / Vasumati	Marathi		
2011	Dubhang	Anjali	Marathi		
2013	Pune 52	Prachi Apte	Marathi		
2013	Konkanastha	Mrs. Gokhale	Marathi		
2013	The Good Road	Kiran	Gujarati		
2014	Dr. Prakash Baba Amte - The Real Hero	Dr. Mandakini Amte	Marathi		
2015	Aga Bai Arechyaa 2	Shubhangi Hemant Kudalkar	Marathi		
2015	Sugar Salt Ani Prem	Aditi	Marathi		
2017	Rahenge Sadaa Gardish Mein Taare	Bhavna Dutt	Hindi		
2017	Ti Ani Itar	Naina Godbole	Marathi		
2017	Kachcha Limboo	Shaila Katdare	Marathi		
2017	Poster Boys	Sunita Chaudhary	Hindi		
2018	Gulabjaam	Radha Agarkar	Marathi		
2018	Hope Aur Hum	Aditi Srivastava	Hindi		
2018	Ani... Dr. Kashinath Ghanekar	Sulochana Latkar	Marathi		
2018	Madhuri	Madhuri	Marathi		
2019	Bharat	Janki Devi Kumar	Hindi		
2021	Pension	Vimal	Marathi		
2021	Toofaan	Sumati Prabhu	Hindi	Special appearance	
2022	Dil Dimag Aur Batti	Jaya Desai Gadgill / Hema Mhatre / Rekha	Marathi		
2022	Ticha Shahar Hona	Archana	Marathi		
2022	Gajra	Mrs. Agarwal	Hindi	Short film	
2023	Sshort And Ssweet	Tanvi	Marathi		
2024	Chandu Champion	Journalist	Hindi		
2024	Jo Tera Hai Woh Mera Hai	Rukmini Meghani	Hindi		
2024	Love, Sitara	Hema Chechi	Hindi		
2024	Out House	Vasu	Hindi		
2025	SuSheela SuJeet	Susheela	Marathi		
2025	Hello Knock Knock Kaun Hai?	Pooja	Hindi		
2026	The Paradise	Samakka	Telugu		
TBA	Hazaar Vela Sholay Pahilela Manus †	TBA	Marathi	Completed	
TBA	Ravan Calling †	TBA	Marathi	Filming	
TBA	The Wives †	TBA	Hindi	Filming	

== Television ==
Year	Title	Role	Language	Ref.
1995	Badalte Rishtey	Ulka Verma	Hindi	
1996	Kata Rute Kunala	Meera	Marathi	
1998	Rishtey	Episodic role	Hindi	
1999–2000	Star Bestsellers (Kya Yahi Pyaar Hai)	Episodic role	Hindi	
2007	Jhalak Dikhhla Jaa 2	Contestant	Hindi	
2008	Fear Factor: Khatron Ke Khiladi 1	Contestant	Hindi	
2010–2011	Kaali – Ek Agnipariksha	Narrator	Hindi	
2016	Tamanna	Dhara's Advocate	Hindi	
2021	Crime Patrol - Satark	Host	Hindi	
2021	Mumbai Diaries 26/11	Mrs. Kelkar	Hindi	
2021	The Whistleblower	Zainab Parkar	Hindi	
2022	Bus Bai Bas	Herself	Marathi	
2022	Half Pants Full Pants	Padma Subbarao	Hindi	
2022	Dharavi Bank	Janvi Surve	Hindi	
2023	Crackdown Season 2	Avantika Shroff	Hindi	
2023	School of Lies	Pallavi	Hindi	
2023	Mumbai Diaries 26/11 – Season 2	Mrs. Kelkar	Hindi	
2024	Manvat Murders	Rukmini	Marathi	
2025	Oops Ab Kya?	Pakhi Jani	Hindi	
2025	The Trial Season 2	Narayani Dhole	Hindi	

== See also ==
- List of awards and nominations received by Sonali Kulkarni
