= List of awards and nominations received by Sonali Kulkarni =

Sonali Kulkarni awards and nominations
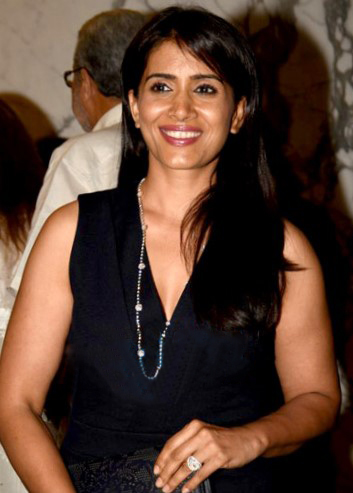
- Kulkarni in 2017
Awards and nominations
Award	Wins	Nominations
Filmfare Awards	0	1
IIFA Awards	0	2
Screen Awards	0	1
Stardust Awards	0	1
Zee Cine Awards	0	1
Filmfare Awards Marathi	4	7
Filmfare OTT Awards	0	1
Maharashtra State Film Awards	4	4
Maharashtracha Favourite Kon?	0	3
National Film Awards	1	1
People's Choice Awards India	0	2
Sanskruti Kala Darpan Awards	1	1
Screen Awards Marathi	1	1
Zee Cine Marathi Awards	1	1
Zee Chitra Gaurav Puraskar	2	2

Totals (Note: Certain award groups do not simply award one winner. They acknowledge several different recipients, have runners-up, and have third place. Since this is a specific recognition and is different from losing an award, runner-up mentions are considered wins in this award tally. For simplification and to avoid errors, each award in this list has been presumed to have had a prior nomination.)
- Wins: 20
- Nominations: 34

Sonali Kulkarni is an Indian actress who has won several awards and nominations. She has received a National Film Award, four Filmfare Awards Marathi, four Maharashtra State Film Awards, a Screen Awards Marathi and two Zee Chitra Gaurav Puraskar.

After making her debut in 1992 with the Kannada film Cheluvi, Kulkarni received critical acclaim and the Maharashtra State Film Award and the Filmfare Award for Best Actress for Doghi (1995). Following year, she won the Grand Prix du Jury for Best Actor at the Valenciennes Adventure Film Festival for Amol Palekar's acclaimed film Daayraa (1996). In 2000, her portrayal of a foster mother in Mission Kashmir earned her several nominations, including Filmfare Awards, IIFA Awards, Screen Awards and Zee Cine Awards in the Best Actress Category. Kulkarni's portrayal of a proud woman, her beautiful redemption from an unfair societal insult, and her tragic bad luck in the short film Chaitra (2002) received a Special Mention – Non-Feature Film at the 49th National Film Awards. She won her first Screen Award Marathi and her second Maharashtra State Award for Devrai (2004), in which she played the sister of a man with schizophrenia who is battling to come to terms with his sickness. Her work in the Italian language film Fuoco Su di Me won her the Best Actress Award at the 2006 Milan International Film Festival. Following this, she starred in several movies, such as Taxi Number 9211 (2007), which earned nominations at the Stardust Awards and the Annual Central European Bollywood Awards.

In 2011, Kulkarni was seen in a brief role as an inspector's wife seeking justice for her husband's suicide in Singham, which received an IIFA Award nomination and Pratibimba, which won the Zee Chitra Gaurav Puraskar for Best Actress. Her performance as a real-life medical practitioner and social worker in the biopic Dr. Prakash Baba Amte-The Real Hero won her Suvarnaratna Awards and first Maharashtracha Favourite Kon for Best Actress. Kulkarni set the record for most Filmfare Marathi Award for Best Actress wins with three after earning the trophies for her performances in Dr. Prakash Baba Amte-The Real Hero and Kachcha Limboo (2017), and one Filmfare Critics Award for Best Actress for her role of a widow in Pension (2021). For Kachcha Limboo, she also earned Sanskruti Kala Darpan Awards, Zee Cine Marathi Awards and the second Zee Chitra Gaurav Puraskar for Best Actress.

Along with acting awards, Kulkarni was honoured with the V. Shantaram Special Contribution Award for her overall contribution in 2015.

== Filmfare Awards ==
The Filmfare Awards are presented annually by The Times Group for excellence of cinematic achievements in Hindi cinema.

Year	Nominated work	Category	Result	Ref.
2001	Mission Kashmir	Best Supporting Actress	Nominated	

== Filmfare Marathi Awards ==
The Filmfare Awards Marathi are presented annually by The Times Group for excellence of cinematic achievements in Marathi cinema. Kulkarni has received four awards in different category from five nominations. She holds the record for most wins in Best Actress category.

Year	Nominated work	Category	Result	Ref.
1995	Mukta	Best Actress	Nominated	
1996	Doghi	Best Actress	Won	
2000	Gharabaher	Best Actress	Nominated	
2015	Dr. Prakash Baba Amte – The Real Hero	Best Actress	Won	
2018	Kachcha Limboo	Best Actress	Won	
2022	Pension	Best Actress	Nominated	
2022	Pension	Best Actress (Critics)	Won	

== Filmfare OTT Awards ==
The Filmfare OTT Awards are annual awards that honour artistic and technical excellence in the Hindi-language original programming over-the-top space.

Year	Nominated work	Category	Result	Ref.
2025	Oops Ab Kya	Best Supporting Actor Series (Female) Comedy	Nominated	

== International Indian Film Academy Awards ==
The International Indian Film Academy Awards are presented annually by the International Indian Film Academy to honour both artistic and technical excellence of professionals in Bollywood, the Hindi film industry.

Year	Nominated work	Category	Result	Ref.
2001	Mission Kashmir	Best Supporting Actress	Nominated	
2012	Singham	Best Supporting Actress	Nominated	

== Maharashtra State Film Awards ==
The Maharashtra State Film Awards are presented annually by the Government of Maharashtra for excellence of cinematic achievements in Marathi cinema.

Year	Nominated work	Category	Result	Ref.
1996	Doghi	Best Actress	Won	
2005	Devrai	Best Actress	Won	
2015	Overall Contribution	V. Shantaram Special Contribution Award	Honored	
2020	Pension	Best Actress	Nominated	
2021	Tich Shahar Hona	Best Actress	Won	

== Maharashtracha Favourite Kon? ==
The Maharashtracha Favourite Kon? are presented by the Marathi television channel Zee Talkies to honour excellence in Marathi cinema.

Year	Nominated work	Category	Result	Ref.
2015	Dr. Prakash Baba Amte – The Real Hero	Favourite Actress	Nominated	
2017	Kachcha Limboo	Favourite Actress	Nominated	
2018	Gulabjaam	Favourite Actress	Nominated	

== National Film Awards ==
The National Film Awards is the most prestigious film award ceremony in India. Established in 1954, it is administered by the International Film Festival of India and the Indian government's Directorate of Film Festivals. The awards are presented by the President of India. Due to their national scale, they are considered to be the equivalent of the Academy Awards.

Year	Nominated work	Category	Result	Ref.
2002	Chaitra	Special Mention (Non-Feature Film)	Won	

== People's Choice Awards ==
The People's Choice Awards India is the Indian version of the American awards show recognising Indian film, television, music and sports. Kulkarni has received one award.

Year	Nominated work	Category	Result	Ref.
2001	Mission Kashmir	Best Supporting Actress	Nominated	
2002	Pyaar Tune Kya Kiya	Best Supporting Actress	Nominated	

== Sanskruti Kala Darpan Awards ==
The Sanskruti Kala Darpan Awards are presented annually by the Archana Nevrekar Foundation to honour film, television and theatre in the Marathi film industry.

Year	Nominated work	Category	Result	Ref.
2018	Kachcha Limboo	Best Actress	Won	

== Screen Awards ==
The Screen Awards are annually presented by the Indian Express Limited to honour excellence of cinematic achievements in Hindi cinema.

Year	Nominated work	Category	Result	Ref.
2001	Mission Kashmir	Best Supporting Actress	Nominated	

== Screen Awards Marathi ==
The Screen Awards are annually presented by the Indian Express Limited to honour excellence of cinematic achievements in Marathi cinema.

Year	Nominated work	Category	Result	Ref.
2004	Devrai	Best Actress	Won	

== Stardust Awards ==
The Stardust Awards are an annual event organised by Magna Publishing Company Limited to honour excellence in the Hindi cinema.

Year	Nominated work	Category	Result	Ref.
2007	Taxi No. 9211	Best Supporting Actress	Nominated	

== Zee Cine Awards ==
The Zee Cine Awards are an annual award ceremony organised by the Zee Entertainment Enterprises.

Year	Nominated work	Category	Result	Ref.
2001	Mission Kashmir	Best Supporting Actress	Nominated	

== Zee Cine Marathi Awards ==
Year	Nominated work	Category	Result	Ref.
2018	Kachcha Limboo	Best Actress	Won	

== Zee Chitra Gaurav Puraskar ==
Year	Nominated work	Category	Result	Ref.
2009	Gulmohar	Best Actress	Nominated	
2013	Pratibimba	Best Actress	Won	
2014	Dr. Prakash Baba Amte – The Real Hero	Best Actress	Nominated	
2018	Kachcha Limboo	Best Actress	Won	

== Other awards ==
Year	Nominated work	Award	Category	Result	Ref.
1996	Kaata Rute Kunala	RAPA Awards	Best Television Performance of the Year	Won	
1996	Daayraa (The Square Circle)	Valenciennes Adventure Film Festival	Grand Prix du Jury (Best Actor)	Won	
2005	Fuoco Su Di Me (Fire At My Heart)	Milan International Film Festival	Best Actress	Won	
2007	Taxi No. 9211	Annual Central European Bollywood Awards	Best Supporting Actress	Nominated	
2015	Dr. Prakash Baba Amte – The Real Hero	Suvarnaratna Awards	Best Actress	Won	
2018	-	Lokmat Maharashtrian of the Year Awards	Film (Female)	Won	
2018	-	Bollywood Film Journalist Awards	Outstanding Contribution to Marathi Cinema	Won	
2022	Ticha Shahar Hona	IFA Istanbul Film Awards	Best Actress in a Feature Film	Won	
2024	Sshort and Ssweet	International Iconic Awards Marathi	Best Actress	Won	
2025	Contribution in Theatre and Cinema	Master Deenanath Mangeshkar Awards	Master Deenanath Mangeshkar Award	Honored	
