= A-Zal =

Music composer from India

Atif Afzal
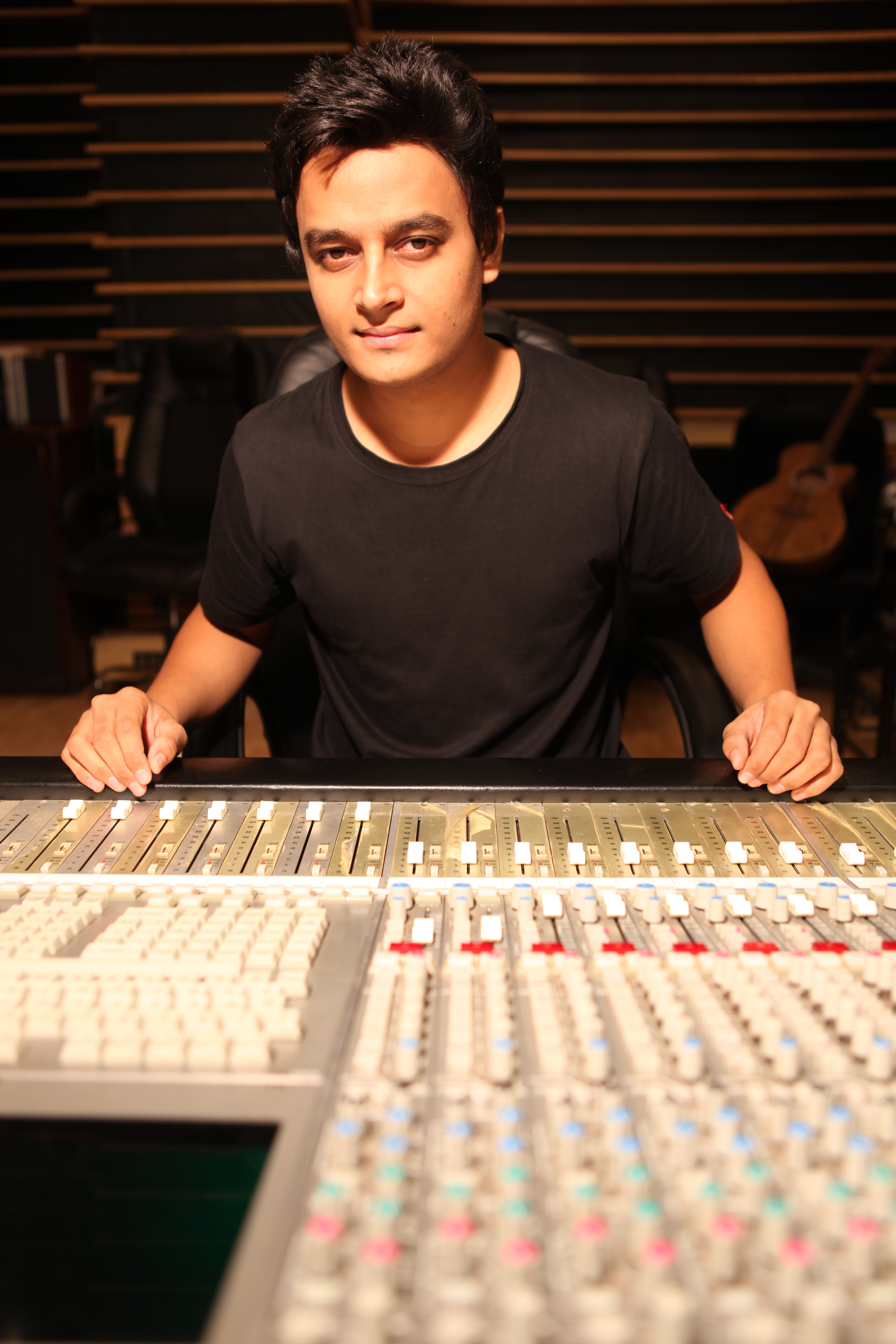
- A-Zal in the 2010s

Background information
- Born: May 17, 1985 (age 41); Mumbai, India
- Education: New York University
- Genres: Pop music, film scores
- Occupations: Singer-songwriter, composer
- Years active: 2013–present
- Website: a-zal.com

Atif Afzal, also known by his stage name A-Zal, is an India-born, London-raised, New York–based singer-songwriter and composer. He is known for his music compositions for the American television series Ms. Marvel (miniseries), Loki (TV series), NCIS: Los Angeles and The Twilight Zone and for the films Resort to Love, Prague, Pune 52, Monsoon Shootout, and Baji.

== Early life and education ==
Atif Afzal was born in Mumbai, India, but grew up in Hounslow, in London, England. He attended Hounslow Heath School.

He studied engineering at the K. J. Somaiya College of Engineering and then worked at KPMG before starting a career in music. He trained under an alumnus from the Royal College of Music.

== Career ==
Afzal is known by his stage name A-Zal.

Afzal began his music career in 2013 by composing the film scores and soundtracks of Prague, Pune 52 and Baji.

He has also worked on international films, including a German film, Gift, a European film, Then a Hero Comes Along, a New York short film, The Alternative, and Bachelor Girls. In 2017, he scored the background music for Monsoon Shootout, which was produced by Anurag Kashyap and DAR Motion Pictures. He also composed music for the Marathi film Charandas Chor.

Afzal's film albums have been released on major record labels including Universal Music Group, Times Music, Zee Music Company and Saregama. He has also sung the songs 'Shravan Shravan' in the film Baji and 'Chor Chor Saare' in the film Charandas Chor.

Afzal moved to New York in 2018 and studied music at New York University. In 2020, he composed soundtracks for the American television series NCIS: Los Angeles and The Twilight Zone.

In 2021, A-Zal composed soundtracks for Loki (TV series) and Alicia Keys produced Netflix film, Resort to Love.

In 2022, A-Zal composed two soundtracks for Marvel Cinematic Studios' Ms. Marvel (miniseries).

In 2023, the artist released his single "Lonely Town". The music video for the single received nominations at the 2023 Montreal Independent Film Festival and the 2024 American Documentary and Animation Film Festival.

== Filmography ==
=== Films ===
- Prague (2013)
- Pune 52 (2013)
- Horn Please (2013)
- Baji (2015)
- That Sunday (2015)
- Bachelor Girls (2016)
- Monsoon Shootout (2017)
- Charandas Chor (2017)
- Gift (2017)
- The Alternative (2018)
- Then a Hero Comes Along
- Resort to Love (2021)

=== Television series ===
- NCIS: Los Angeles
- The Twilight Zone
- Loki
- Ms. Marvel

== Discography ==
=== Singles ===
- "Movie Script"
- "Lonely Town"
- "Autopilot"
- "Phonebook"
- "Fa Fa Fa"
