= Pension (disambiguation) =

A pension is a regular payment made during retirement.

Pension may also refer to:

- Pension (lodging), a type of guest house or boarding house
- Pension (film), a 2021 Indian drama film
