= Nikhil Mahajan =

Indian film director (born 1984)

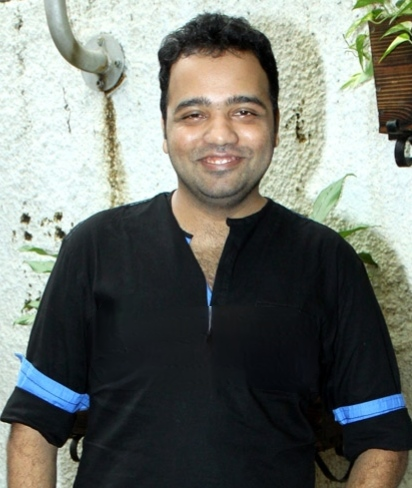
- Born: 21 July 1984 (age 42); Aurangabad, Maharashtra, India
- Occupations: Theatre director; Film director; Film producer; Screenwriter
- Years active: 2013–present
- Spouse: Mrinmayee Godbole (m. 2017)

Nikhil Mahajan (born 21 July 1984) is an Indian filmmaker, producer, and screenwriter; working predominantly in Marathi cinema and Marathi theatre. He is a recipient of a National Film Award, four Maharashtra State Film Awards, three Filmfare Awards Marathi, a International Film Festival of India.

== Early life ==
Mahajan was born on 21 July 1984 in Aurangabad, Maharashtra. He grew up in an academic family; both of his parents were academics. He later moved to Australia to pursue formal education in filmmaking and graduated from Sydney Film School.

== Personal life ==
Mahajan married actress Mrinmayee Godbole in a registered marriage in Pune on 21 February 2017. The couple opted for a simple ceremony attended by family members and close friends.

== Career ==
After completing his film education in Australia, he returned to India and began working in the film industry. He made his feature-film directorial debut with the Marathi neo-noir thriller Pune 52, which was released in 2013. The film starred Girish Kulkarni, Sonali Kulkarni and Sai Tamhankar. He received the Maharashtra State Film Award for Best Debut Director for the film. He subsequently directed the Marathi action film Baji, released in 2015. He later expanded his work as a writer, contributing to films directed by other filmmakers. He was one of the writers of the Marathi coming-of-age film June (2021), for which he received a Filmfare Marathi nomination for Best Screenplay. In 2020, Mahajan made his streaming debut as one of the directors of the Netflix horror series Betaal, which he co-directed with Patrick Graham.

In 2021, Mahajan directed Godavari, a Marathi drama set in Nashik on the banks of the Godavari River. The film starred Jitendra Joshi, Neena Kulkarni, Vikram Gokhale, Gauri Nalawade and Priyadarshan Jadhav. Godavari was selected for the Indian Panorama section of the 52nd International Film Festival of India and won the Special Jury Award at the festival for Mahajan. Godavari became his most acclaimed directorial work. He won the National Film Award for Best Direction for the film at the 69th National Film Awards. He also won the Filmfare Marathi Award for Best Director and the Filmfare Marathi Award for Best Screenplay, which he shared with Prajakt Deshmukh. At the 59th Maharashtra State Film Awards, Godavari also earned Mahajan the Best Director award. In 2023, Mahajan wrote and directed the Hindi romantic thriller I Love You, starring Rakul Preet Singh, Pavail Gulati and Akshay Oberoi. The film was released directly on JioCinema. He subsequently worked on the Marathi film Raavsaaheb (2024), serving as its writer and director. He also continued his work as a screenwriter, including Tighee, released in 2026, for which he is credited with the screenplay.

== Filmography ==
=== Films ===
Year	Title	Director	Writer	Producer	Notes
2013	Pune 52	Yes	Yes	No	Maharashtra State Film Award for Best Debut Director
2015	Baji	Yes	Yes	Yes	
2021	June	No	Yes	Yes	Maharashtra State Film Award for Best Debut Production
2021	Godavari	Yes	Yes	Yes	National Film Award for Best Direction
2022	Topaz	No	Yes	No	
2023	I Love You	Yes	Yes	No	
2024	Raavsaheb	No	Yes	No	
2025	Mongoose	No	Yes	No	
2026	Tighee	No	Yes	Yes	

=== Television ===
Year	Title	Notes	Ref.
2020	Betaal	Television debut as a director	

=== Theatre ===
Year	Title	Notes	Ref.
2019	Sakharam B.	Theatre debut as a writer	

== Awards and nominations ==
Year	Awards	Categories	Work	Result	Ref.
2013	Maharashtra State Film Awards	Best Debut Director	Pune 52	Won	
2020	58th Maharashtra State Film Awards	Best Debut Production	June	Won	
2021	6th Filmfare Awards Marathi	Best Dialogue	June	Nominated	
2021	69th National Film Awards	Best Director	Godavari	Won	
2021	59th Maharashtra State Film Awards	Best Third Film	Godavari	Won	
2021	59th Maharashtra State Film Awards	Best Director	Godavari	Won	
2021	59th Maharashtra State Film Awards	Best Screenplay	Godavari	Nominated	
2022	7th Filmfare Awards Marathi	Best Film	Godavari	Won	
2022	7th Filmfare Awards Marathi	Best Director	Godavari	Won	
2022	7th Filmfare Awards Marathi	Best Screenplay	Godavari	Won	
2022	52nd International Film Festival of India	Special Jury Award	Godavari	Won	
2022	Pune International Film Festival	Best Director	Godavari	Won	
2022	Zee Chitra Gaurav Puraskar	Best Film	Godavari	Nominated	
2022	Zee Chitra Gaurav Puraskar	Best Director	Godavari	Nominated	
2022	Zee Chitra Gaurav Puraskar	Best Story	Godavari	Nominated	
2022	Zee Chitra Gaurav Puraskar	Best Screenplay	Godavari	Nominated	
2024	55th International Film Festival of India	Best Film	Raavsaheb	Nominated	
2026	New York Indian Film Festival	Best Screenplay	Tighee	Won	
