= Ekda Kaay Zala =

2022 Marathi-language family drama film

- Directed by: Saleel Kulkarni
- Written by: Saleel Kulkarni
- Produced by: Saleel Kulkarni; Siddharth Mahadevan; Soumil Shringarpure; Siddharth Khinvasara; Soumendu Kuber; Arundhati Datye; Anoop Nimkar; Nitin Prakash Vaidya
- Starring: Sumeet Raghvan; Urmilla Kothare; Mohan Agashe; Pushkar Shrotri; Mukta Barve; Arjun Purnapatre
- Edited by: Abhijeet Deshpande; Pravin Jahagirdar
- Music by: Saleel Kulkarni
- Production companies: Showbox Entertainment; Gajavadana; Rairah Corporation
- Release date: 5 August 2022
- Running time: 130 minutes
- Country: India
- Language: Marathi

Ekda Kaay Zala (transl. Once what happened) is a 2022 Marathi-language family drama film written, directed and co-produced by Saleel Kulkarni. This is Saleel Kulkarni's second directorial venture. The film stars Sumeet Raghavan as the titular character with Urmilla Kothare, Mohan Agashe, Pushkar Shrotri, Mukta Barve, Arjun Purnapatre and Suhas Joshi in supporting roles.

It won the National Film Award for Best Marathi Feature Film at the 69th National Film Awards and received seven nominations at 59th Maharashtra State Film Awards. It was later adapted into Telugu as Anaganaga (2025).

== Plot ==
Ekda Kaay Zala is essentially the story of a storyteller. The protagonist of the film- Kiran, is a family man. Father to a 9-year-old boy, Kiran strongly believes in the power of storytelling. He firmly believes that stories have the power to entertain, infuse hope, teach universal life lessons and move you to tears.

Storytelling is omnipotent, and omnipresent and appeals to everyone, irrespective of age. With this conviction that kids learn and absorb much more, through stories being narrated to them through various art forms such as drama, dance etc. rather than the usual conventional methods, he runs a unique school using the idea of storytelling as a pedagogical tool.

His 9-year-old son idolizes him, emulates him in every way and aspires to be like him. The father-son duo shares an inseparable bond.

In a cruel twist of fate, an unexpected event leads to an upheaval in their lives.

== Cast ==
- Sumeet Raghavan as Kiran
- Urmila Kothare as Shruti
- Arjun Purnapatre as Chintan
- Mohan Agashe as Kiran's Father
- Suhas Joshi as Kiran's Mother
- Pushkar Shrotri as Jay
- Mukta Barve as Dr. Saniya
- Rajesh Bhosle as Eknath Dada
- Merwan Kale as Raghu
- Guru as Adwait Wachkawade
- Akash as Adwait Ghulekar

== Soundtrack ==
No.	Title	Singer(s)	Length
1	"Re Kshana"	Shankar Mahadevan	04:23
2	"Balala Zop Ka Ga Yet Nahi"	Sunidhi Chauhan	04:01
3	"Shyam Ani Ram"	Shubhankar Kulkarni	03:48
4	"Bhimrupi"	Chorus	03:56

== Reception ==
Anub George of The Times of India has praised the movie by stating it is one of the most valuable films of 2022. Lokmat published a positive review on the movie. News 18 talked about Sunidhi Chauhan's Marathi song in the movie. Maharashtra Times wrote that actors in the movie did justice to their characters. Pune Mirror wrote the movie is refreshing and very unique. Hindustan Times wrote, "Even though the subject is a difficult one, it has been showcased in a decent manner". Vinod Ghatge of ABPMazha gave it four stars and wrote "Ekda Kaay Zala' is a film that makes you think calmly, and most importantly, teaches the little mind to be careful".

== Awards ==
=== 2021: National Film Awards ===
Winner

- National Film Award for Best Marathi Feature Film

=== 2024: Maharashtra State Film Awards ===
Nominations

- Best Film
- Best Director – Saleel Kulkarni
- Best Actor – Sumeet Raghavan
- Best Playback Singer Male – Shubhankar Kulkarni for "Mi Aahe Shyam"
- Best Lyricist – Sandeep Khare for "Mi Aahe Shyam"
- Best Music Director – Salil Kulkarni
- Best Story – Salil Kulkarni
