= Pune 52 =

- Film poster
- Directed by: Nikhil Mahajan
- Written by: Girish Kulkarni; Nikhil Mahajan
- Produced by: Abhay Gadgil; Girish Kulkarni; Shrirang Godbole; Umesh Vinayak Kulkarni
- Starring: Girish Kulkarni; Sonali Kulkarni; Sai Tamhankar
- Cinematography: Jeremy Reagan
- Edited by: Abhijit Deshpande
- Music by: Atif Afzal
- Production companies: IME Motion Pictures; Arbhaat Nirmitee
- Release date: 18 January 2013 (Theatrical)
- Country: India
- Language: Marathi

Pune 52 is a 2013 Neo-noir Thriller Marathi language film directed by National Award Winner Nikhil Mahajan. It stars Girish Kulkarni, Sonali Kulkarni and Sai Tamhankar in the leading roles. The film was loosely inspired by 1974 Hollywood classic Chinatown. This is directorial debut film for Nikhil Mahajan. Atif Afzal composed the music and background score for the film.

The movie got released on 18 April 2015 in Maharashtra. On 21 May 2014 it is officially released on YouTube on the official account of IME Motion Pictures.

== Plot ==
Amar Apte is a private detective who makes ends meet by spying on cheating partners. He is married to Prachi who silently regrets marrying him despite her parents being against this marriage. Amar is not able to meet ends and supported by his in-laws.

On one such assignment, he is able to get a close-up of a lady with her lover as insisted by her husband but gets exposed because of proximity. Although he escapes from the scene, later he gets a visit from cops who tells him that he has messed with the wrong guy. The lover of the lady he had caught earlier is Mr. Prasad Sathe a prominent businessman and filed a case for breach of privacy. The police take all his earnings from this case as a bribe to hush up the case.

Later a lady visits Amar who wants to spy on her husband. She introduces herself as Neha, wife of Prasad Sathe. She hands him the exact amount he had lost bribing the police in advance for the job. Later when he visits her home he remarks that Prasad does not stay here, to which she replies that he visits occasionally.

They start meeting regularly on the pretext of spy work and share their deep feelings. Both start falling in love with each other. On the other side when Amar is spying Prasad he finds out the place where he stays and subsequently finds out that Neha is Prasad's mistress while his wife is someone else. Enraged Amar confronts Prasad with all the evidence and demands the same fee he had lost earlier because of him. Prasad responds that the fee is peanuts for him and he would receive a big paycheck if he does a small job for him.

He later tells Neha not to worry, her husband does not have an affair. One night he has an argument with Prachi and she admonishes him saying that no woman would love a man like him who cannot take responsibility for the household. He is enraged and vents out all his frustration on her. He then goes straight to Neha and asks her if a woman would love a man like him. They get entangled in emotions which leads them to have sex. An unknown person calls Prachi and she visits Neha's place where she finds them having sex. The next day when Amar returns home, Prachi tells him that she is pregnant and seems to have forgiven him. Later in the day Neha meets him at his office which is attached to his home. There she tries to pursue the relationship and tells him that it cannot be a one-night stand. She would reveal the relationship to her wife if he doesn't comply with her. Amar tries to calm her and tells her that they cannot discuss these things at his office and they go to her home. Amar goes through mixed emotions and accepts that he deeply loves her, but at the same time he cannot be an unfaithful husband or an irresponsible father. She gives Amar 15 mins before she would call Prachi. Amar rushes home to answer that call in nick of a time and then leaves for the funeral of his neighbour who died of old age. Later Neha again visits Amar and since he is not at home, she gives a letter to his mother in law.

When Amar returns his mother-in-law tells him that Neha had come to visit him, forgetting about the letter. Amar rushes to Neha's place and tries to explain his position to her. As he is doing that he turns back to see Neha lying on the floor profusely bleeding from her head. He does not understand what to do and in panic rushes back home. The next day he scans the newspaper for any news, tries calling Neha's and visits her place but there is no trace of Neha. He is surprised by a car honking and when he comes out of her home he finds a car waiting for him. The driver takes him to a private party hosted by Prasad along with prominent people (high ranking police officers, politicians, etc.) in the party and they all ask him for his visiting card. A different girl is in the arms of Prasad and he gives him his fat paycheck as promised earlier.

Amar's financial situation improves and he leads the life of the detective he once dreamt of. His rise makes Prachi and her parents happy, despite this Amar has hallucinations and Neha's voice rings in his ears. One day he happens to find the letter Neha had earlier given to him where she mentions that with great difficulty she has managed to forgive him and move on. If he wishes to lead his life as a responsible husband then he should never meet her again. Reading this he decides to find Neha and meets Prasad to find her whereabouts. He tells him that Neha is already dead and reminds him that it was he who has actually killed her without leaving any trace. Later he recalls the fat deal he had earlier made with Prasad was for getting rid of Neha from his life. Amar returns home with a heavy heart finally gathers the courage to tell Prachi that he has committed murder of Neha and he might be killed now, and if he doesn't return tomorrow, understand the situation and help him. Prachi is shocked and cannot react to this. However, the next day they both visit the doctor for Prachi's sonography.

== Cast ==
- Girish Kulkarni as Amar Apte
- Sonali Kulkarni as Prachi Apte
- Sai Tamhankar as Neha Sanap
- Bharati Achrekar as Prachi's Mother
- Kiran Karmarkar as Builder
- Swanand Kirkire

== Release ==
The film was released on 18 January 2015 in Maharashtra. A first look launch event of the movie took place on 22 August 2012 in Hotel Deccan Rendezvous On 21 May 2014, the film was officially released on YouTube on the official account of IME Motion Pictures.

== Soundtrack ==
Pune 52

Soundtrack album by Atif Afzal
- Released: 8 Jan 2013
- Genre: Film soundtrack
- Length: 4:46
- Label: IME Motion Pictures Pvt. Ltd

Atif Afzal chronology
Prague (2013)	Pune 52 (2013)	Baji (2015)

Atif Afzal (A-Zal) composed the score. Album has only one song

=== Track listing ===
Pune 52
No.	Title	Singer(s)	Length
1.	"Jag Sare Badale"	Shalmali Kholgade	4:46
Total length:			4:46

== Critical reception ==
The film has received positive reviews from DNA, and livemint.com.
