= Timeri N. Murari =

Indian novelist, journalist, playwright and screenwriter

Timeri Murari is an Indian novelist, journalist, playwright and screenwriter. He is the author of fourteen published novels, including best-sellers The Taliban Cricket Club (2012) and Taj (1985, republished 2007), and has written extensively for Indian and international newspapers including The Guardian. He has also written the screenplay of the award-winning Hindi movie Daayraa (1997), which was voted one of the ten best films of 1997 by Time magazine. He adapted and directed it as a stage play, The Square Circle, at the Leicester Haymarket Theatre in November 1999, starring Parminder Nagra.

== Early years ==
Murari was born in Madras, India and studied at Bishop Cottons Boys' School, Bangalore. He left India for the UK when he was 18 years old to study electronic engineering. He later switched majors to History and Political Science at the McGill University, Montreal. While at university, he began writing for The Guardian and other international newspapers.

His first job was a reporter on the Kingston Whig Standard, in Kingston, Ontario. Murari moved to London, UK, and worked and wrote for The Guardian, The Sunday Times, The Observer and other newspapers and magazines before once again shifting base to New York. In the US, Murari wrote film documentaries and contributed to The New York Times, The Washington Post, Cosmopolitan among others. He is now living in India.

== Novels ==
Murari's first novel, The Marriage, was published in the UK and India. Since then, he has written 18 books, which have been translated into several languages. Fourteen are works of fiction, including the best sellers Taj, which has been translated into 25 languages, and The Taliban Cricket Club, translated into nine languages. Two of his novels - Field of Honour (I was very much impressed with Field of Honour- Graham Greene) and Four Steps from Paradise - are semi-biographical. He has also written a book for children, Children of the Enchanted Jungle. Scholastic published his Young Adult Axxiss Trilogy in 2016 through to 2018. Aleph has published his latest novel, Chanakya Returns (Indian title) in July 2014. In 2019, the UK publisher, Endeavour Media re-issued his novels, TAJ, The Imperial Agent and The Last Victory online as well as print-on-demand. Also in 2019, Speaking Tiger published his travel/history/memoire, Empress of the Taj, In search of Mumtaz Mahal. His new novel, a dystopian 'Chicanery" October 2024.

== Non-fiction ==
Murari has written five non-fiction books. Two of these are memoirs -- My Temporary Son and Limping to the Centre of the World. Empress of the Taj, In search of Mumtaz Mahal is also partly a travel memoire.

== Bibliography ==
=== Novels ===
1. The Marriage
2. The Oblivion Tapes
3. Lovers Are Not People
4. The Shooter
5. Field of Honour
6. TAJ, A Novel on Mughal India
7. Imperial Agent, a sequel to Kipling's Kim
8. The Last Victory Part II of Imperial Agent
9. Enduring Affairs
10. Four Steps From Paradise
11. The Arrangements of Love
12. The Small House
13. The Taliban Cricket Club
14. Chanakya Returns

16 Chicanery

=== Young Adult ===
1. Children of the Enchanted Jungle.

2. Axxiss Trilogy.

1. Axxiss and The Magic Medallions.
2. Axxiss and The Undersea Kingdom.
3. Axxiss and the Parallel Universe.

=== Non-fiction ===
1. Empress of the Taj, In search of Mumtaz Mahal.
2. My Temporary Son: An Orphan's Journey
3. Limping to the Centre of the World: A Pilgrimage to Mount Kailash
4. Goin’ Home, a Black Family Returns South
5. The New Savages: Children of the Liverpool Streets

=== Plays ===
1. Enter Queen Lear, starring Jenny Runacre staged in London September 2016. Jenny said: "I do really think it is a fascinating play, with so many levels in it. It is not very often that an actress is given a role that has so much meat in it."
2. Square Circle Starring Parminder Nagra. (Also directed)
3. Killing Time
4. The Attempted Assassination of Salman Rushdie
5. Lovers Are Not People
6. The Inquisitor
7. Hey, Hero!

=== Film/Television ===
1. Daayra (The Square Circle) Writer/Producer.
2. The Only Thing
3. Only in America (A TV documentary in three parts) Writer.
