= Karkhanisanchi Waari =

2021 Indian Marathi-language film

- Directed by: Mangesh Joshi
- Written by: Archana Borhade; Mangesh Joshi
- Produced by: Archana Borhade; Mangesh Joshi; Zulfia Waris
- Starring: Amey Wagh; Geetanjali Kulkarni; Mohan Agashe; Mrunmayee Deshpande
- Cinematography: Archana Borhade
- Edited by: Suchitra Sathe
- Music by: A. V. Prafullachandra
- Production companies: Nine Archers Picture Company; ABP Studios
- Distributed by: AA Films
- Release date: 10 December 2021
- Running time: 108 minutes
- Country: India
- Language: Marathi

Karkhanisanchi Waari - Ashes on a Road Trip is a 2021 Indian Marathi-language drama film written and directed by Mangesh Joshi. It was produced by Archana Borhade, Mangesh Joshi and Zulfia Waris under the banners of Nine Archers Picture Company and ABP Studios. The film stars Amey Wagh, Mohan Agashe, Geetanjali Kulkarni and Mrunmayee Deshpande. It was premiered digitally on SonyLIV on 10 December 2021. The film won Maharashtra State Film Award for Best Film at 59th Maharashtra State Film Awards.

== Plot ==
The Karkhanis family, believed to be one of Pune's last remaining joint families, is brought together following the death of its eldest member, Purushottam. In accordance with his final wish, his ashes are to be scattered at three places: the family's ancestral home, their farm, and the Chandrabhaga River in Pandharpur. He also leaves behind a sealed envelope, which the family is instructed to open only after completing the ritual.

Purushottam's three surviving brothers, Satish, Pradeep and Ajit, his sister Sadhana, and his son Om embark on a journey from Pune to Pandharpur in the family's Omni to fulfil his final wish. Their journey is marked by comic situations, family disputes and long-standing tensions. As they travel, each family member becomes increasingly curious about the contents of Purushottam's envelope, with many hoping that it contains instructions for dividing the family's wealth. Meanwhile, Om's girlfriend, Madhuri, follows the family in her motorcycle. The two have been in a secret relationship for several years, as Om fears that his conservative family will not accept Madhuri. Tired of waiting, Madhuri is determined to marry Om, much to his embarrassment. At the same time, Purushottam's widow, Indira, discovers a mysterious joint bank account. She travels alone from Pune to Dehu in an attempt to uncover a secret that has remained hidden for 20 years. The two journeys gradually reveal long-held secrets and unresolved relationships within the family, ultimately changing the way its members view one another.

== Cast ==
- Amey Wagh as Om Karkhanis
- Mohan Agashe as Satish Karkhanis
- Geetanjali Kulkarni as Sadhana Karkhanis
- Mrunmayee Deshpande as Madhuri Kalbhor
- Vandana Gupte as Indira Karkhanis
- Shubhangi Gokhale as Indira Karkhanis II
- Ajit Abhyankar as Ajit Karkhanis
- Pradeep Joshi as Pradeep Karkhanis
- Vitthal Patil as TV host
- Bhushan Manjule as Bhavdya
- Sumit Sanghamitra as Garage owner
- Amruta Koli

== Reception ==
Nandini Ramnath of Scroll.in praised the film as an entertaining black comedy, particularly highlighting its quirky and bitter portrayal of family tensions and the performances of its ensemble cast, while noting that its overly busy screenplay occasionally slows the film's journey. Kalpeshraj Kubal of Maharashtra Times praised Karkhanisanchi Waari for its realistic storytelling, direction and cinematography, particularly highlighting the performances of Mohan Agashe, Pradeep Joshi, Ajit Abhyankar, Geetanjali Kulkarni and Amey Wagh, and rated the film three-and-a-half stars.

== Accolades ==
| Year | Award | Category | Recipient(s) | Result |
|---|---|---|---|---|
| 2021 | Maharashtra State Film Awards | Best Film | Nine Archers Picture Company & ABP Studios | Won |
| 2021 | Maharashtra State Film Awards | Best Director | Mangesh Joshi | Won |
| 2021 | Maharashtra State Film Awards | Best Supporting Actor | Mohan Agashe | Nominated |
| 2021 | Maharashtra State Film Awards | Best Story | Mangesh Joshi, Archana Borhade | Won |
| 2021 | Maharashtra State Film Awards | Best Background Score | Sarang Kulkarni | Won |
| 2022 | Filmfare Awards Marathi | Best Film | Nine Archers Picture Company & ABP Studios | Won |
| 2022 | Filmfare Awards Marathi | Best Director | Mangesh Joshi | Won |
| 2022 | Filmfare Awards Marathi | Best Supporting Actor | Amey Wagh | Nominated |
| 2022 | Filmfare Awards Marathi | Best Supporting Actress | Geetanjali Kulkarni | Won |
| 2022 | Filmfare Awards Marathi | Best Music Director | AV Prafullachandra | Nominated |
| 2022 | Filmfare Awards Marathi | Best Cinematographer | Archana Borhade | Nominated |
| 2022 | Filmfare Awards Marathi | Best Editing | Suchitra Sathe | Nominated |
| 2022 | Filmfare Awards Marathi | Best Background Score | Sarang Kulkarni | Nominated |
| 2022 | Filmfare Awards Marathi | Best Art Director | Sagar Gaikwad | Nominated |
