= Baalbhaarti =

- Promotional release poster
- Directed by: Nitin Nandan
- Produced by: Sanjoy Waddhwa; Comall Sanjoy W
- Starring: Siddhartha Jadhav; Aaryan Menghji; Nandita Patkar; Abhijeet Khandkekar
- Cinematography: Pushpank Gawade
- Edited by: Kshitija Khandagale
- Music by: Pankaj Padghan
- Production company: Sphereorigins Multivision Private Limited
- Distributed by: Mantra Luminosity
- Release date: 2 December 2022
- Country: India
- Language: Marathi

Baalbhaarti is 2022 Indian Marathi-language drama film written and directed by Nitin Nandan and produced by A Sphereorigins Production.

== Cast ==
- Siddhartha Jadhav as Rahul Desai
- Nandita Patkar as Sunita Desai
- Abhijeet Khandkekar
- Aaryan Menghji
- Usha Naik
- Ravindra Mankani
- Sanjay Mone
- Usha Naik as Rahul's mother

== Release and marketing ==
Initially film was set to be released on 11 November 2022. Later it was released on 2 December 2022 in theaters.

Siddhartha Jadhav showed the trailer of the movie to the Chief Minister of Maharashtra Eknath Shinde, received positive response from Shinde. During the shooting of the 2022 Hindi film Circus, Siddhartha Jadhav promoted with some Bollywood actors like Ranveer Singh, Pooja Hegde, Varun Sharma, Jacqueline Fernandez.

== Soundtrack ==
Baalbhaarti

Soundtrack album by Pankaj Padghan
- Released: 17 November 2022
- Genre: Feature film soundtrack
- Length: 19:36
- Language: Marathi
- Label: Zee Music Company

Official audio
- Baalbhaarti - Full Album on YouTube

All music is composed by Pankaj Padghan.

Track listing
No.	Title	Lyrics	Length
1.	"Shiknyat"	Valay Mulgund	3:12
2.	"Shabbas"	Nitin Nandan, Valay Mulgund	2:34
3.	"Sarswati Bhaarti"	Nitin Nandan	2:12
4.	"Sairbhair (female version)"	Valay Mulgund	4:40
5.	"Sairbhair (male version)"	Valay Mulgund	4:41
Total length:			19:36

== Accolades ==
=== 2024: Maharashtra State Film Awards ===
Winners

- Best Social Film
- Best Social Film Director – Nitin Nandan
- Best Child Artist – Aaryan Menghji
- Best Dialogue – Nitin Nandan
