= Frame (2026 film) =

2026 Indian Marathi-language film

- Directed by: Vikram Patwardhan
- Written by: Vikram Patwardhan
- Produced by: Nagraj Manjule; Gargee Kulkarni; Bavesh Janavlekar
- Starring: Nagraj Manjule; Amey Wagh; Mugdha Godse
- Cinematography: Milind Jog
- Edited by: Kutub Inamdar
- Music by: A. V. Prafullachandra
- Production companies: Aatpat Productions; Zee Studios
- Distributed by: ZEE5
- Release date: 10 July 2026
- Running time: 115 minutes
- Country: India
- Language: Marathi

Frame is a 2026 Indian Marathi-language social drama film written and directed by Vikram Patwardhan. It was produced by Nagraj Manjule, Gargee Kulkarni and Bavesh Janavlekar under the banners of Aatpat Productions and Zee Studios. The film stars Nagraj Manjule, Amey Wagh and Mugdha Godse. It was released on 10 July 2026 on ZEE5 and received a positive response from critics and audiences, particularly for its subject, direction, and performances.

== Plot ==
Chandu Pansare, an experienced photojournalist working for a newspaper in Pune, believes that life, like art, has no fixed rules. He mentors Siddharth Deshmukh, a young photojournalist who has recently joined the newspaper. While Chandu prioritizes capturing photographs before anything else, Siddharth places greater importance on helping people in distress.

Their contrasting philosophies are put to the test when a devastating earthquake triggers a series of events that challenge both their personal values and professional ethics. As they confront difficult moral choices, the two find their beliefs increasingly intertwined, forcing them to question the balance between journalistic duty and human compassion.

== Cast ==
- Nagraj Manjule as Chandu Pansare
- Amey Wagh as Siddharth Deshmukh
- Mugdha Godse as Chandu's wife
- Akshaya Gurav as Ragini

== Reception ==
Shreyas Pande of The Hindu praised the film's maturity, restraint, and the lead performances of Nagraj Manjule and Amey Wagh, describing it as a reflective and elevated "cautionary tale against mass desensitisation." Aishani Biswas of Outlook India rated the film 2 out of 5 stars, commending Nagraj Manjule's restrained performance and its honest exploration of journalism ethics, but noting that an "underwhelming climax" ultimately weakened the screenplay's impact. Nandini Ramnath of Scroll.in commended the film's authentic portrayal of newsroom culture and Nagraj Manjule's performance, but felt the narrative grew threadbare in the second half and "flubbed its most decisive moment" with an unrealistic climactic scene. Amruta Yadav of Navarashtra praised the film's realistic portrayal, cinematography, and the powerful performances of Nagraj Manjule and Amey Wagh, describing it as a thought-provoking watch that successfully captures the emotional conflict between professionalism and human sensitivity in journalism.

== Accolades ==
At the 59th Maharashtra State Film Awards, Frame received critical acclaim, securing multiple prominent honors for its direction, performances, and overall production:

Year	Award	Category	Recipient(s)	Result
2021	Maharashtra State Film Awards	Best Second Film	Aatpat Production	Won
2021	Maharashtra State Film Awards	Best Second Director	Vikram Patwardhan	Won
2021	Maharashtra State Film Awards	Best Debut Direction	Vikram Patwardhan	Nominated
2021	Maharashtra State Film Awards	Best Supporting Actor	Amey Wagh	Won
