= 59th Maharashtra State Film Awards =

Award ceremony for Indian films of 2022

- Awarded for: Best of Marathi cinema in 2021
- Awarded by: Government of Maharashtra
- Announced on: 21 August 2024
- Site: NSCI Dome, Worli, Mumbai
- Hosted by: Girija Oak and Sonali Kulkarni
- Official website: www.filmcitymumbai.org

Highlights
- Best Feature Film: Karkhanisanchi Waari
- Most awards: Godavari (5)

The 59th Maharashtra State Film Awards, presented by the Government of Maharashtra celebrated excellence in Marathi cinema by honoring the best films released in 2021.

The 58th and 59th editions were organized together, with the nominations for both announced on 14 August 2024.

Godavari led the winners’ list with 5 awards, including Best Film III, Best Director III and Best Actor. It was followed by Karkhanisanchi Waari, Baalbhaarti and Ticha Shahar Hona each of which secured 4 awards.

== Jury members ==
• Amita Khopkar	• Milind Shinde
• Zafar Sultan	• Sanyogita Bhave
• Sunil Devlekar	• Aniket Khandagale
• Keshav Pandare	• Madanmohan Khade
• Pitambar Kale	• Vivek Apte
• Shailendra Barve	• Sandeep Patil
• Satish Randive	• Narendra Pandit
• Milind Lele

== Awards and nominations ==
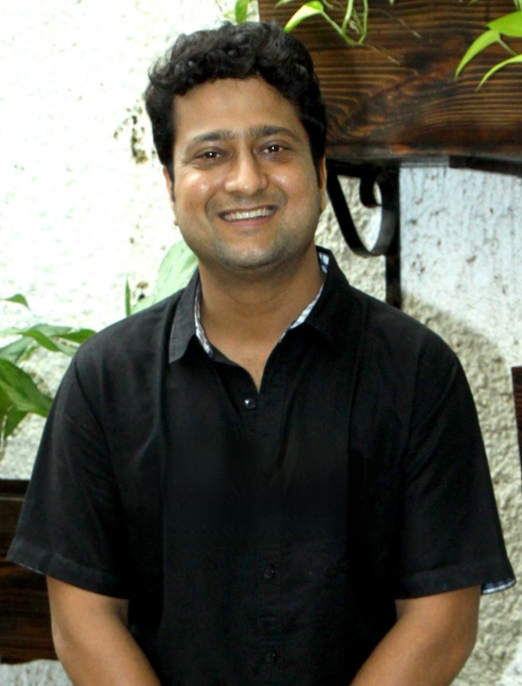
Jitendra Joshi, Best Actor and Best Lyricist

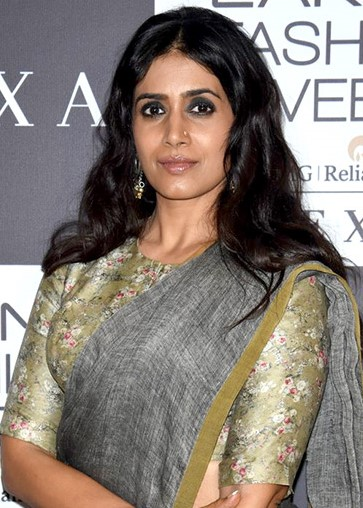
Sonali Kulkarni, Best Actress

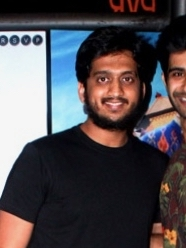
Amey Wagh, Best Supporting Actor

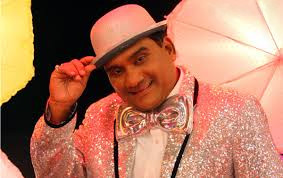
Bhalchandra Kadam, Best Comedian Male

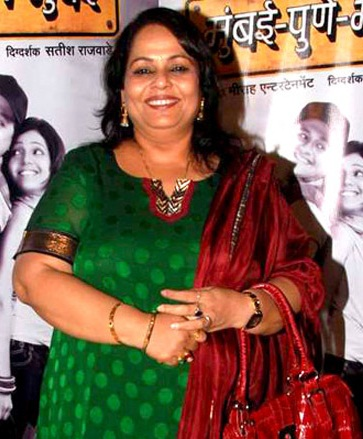
Nirmiti Sawant, Best Comedian Female

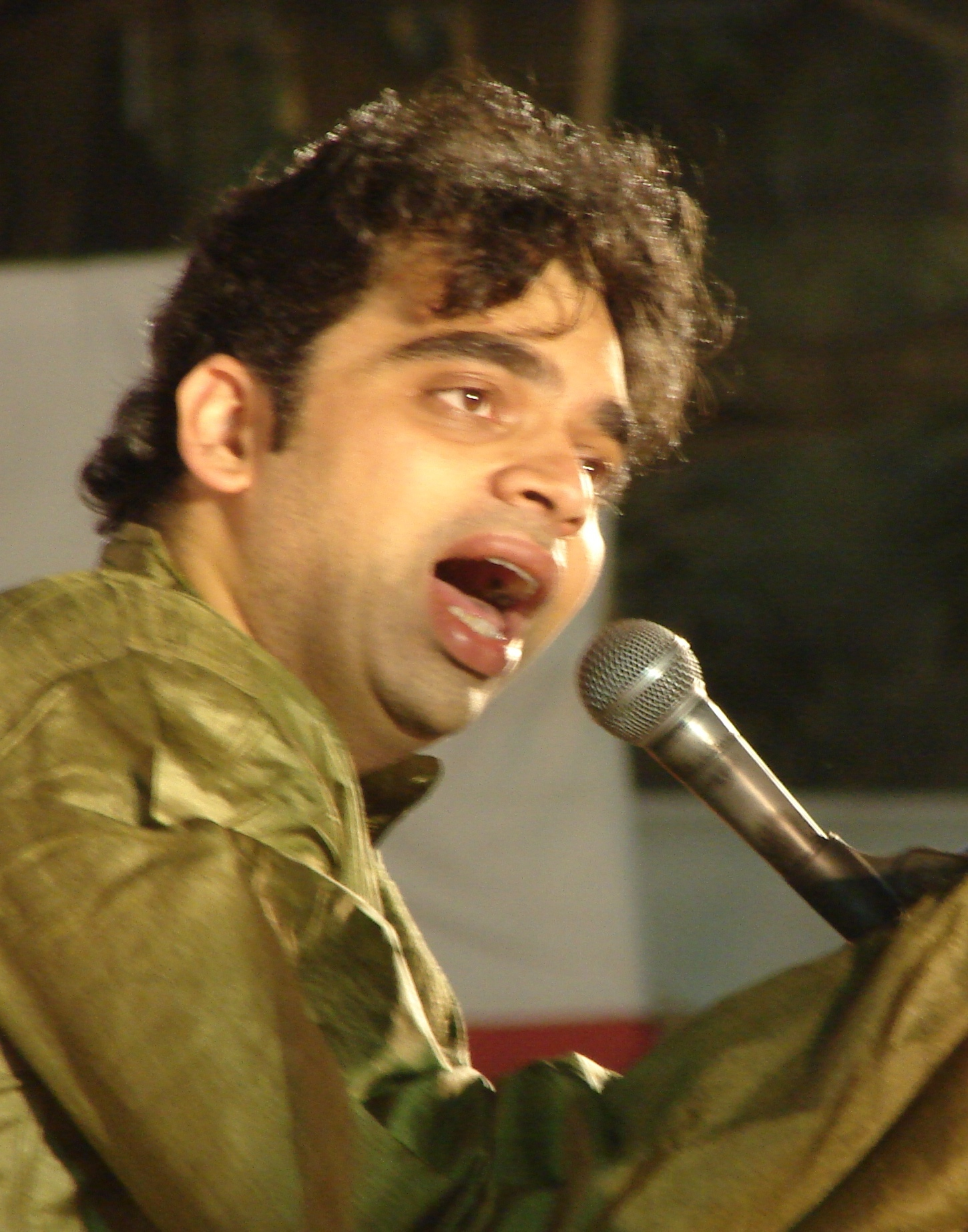
Rahul Deshpande, Best Playback Singer Male

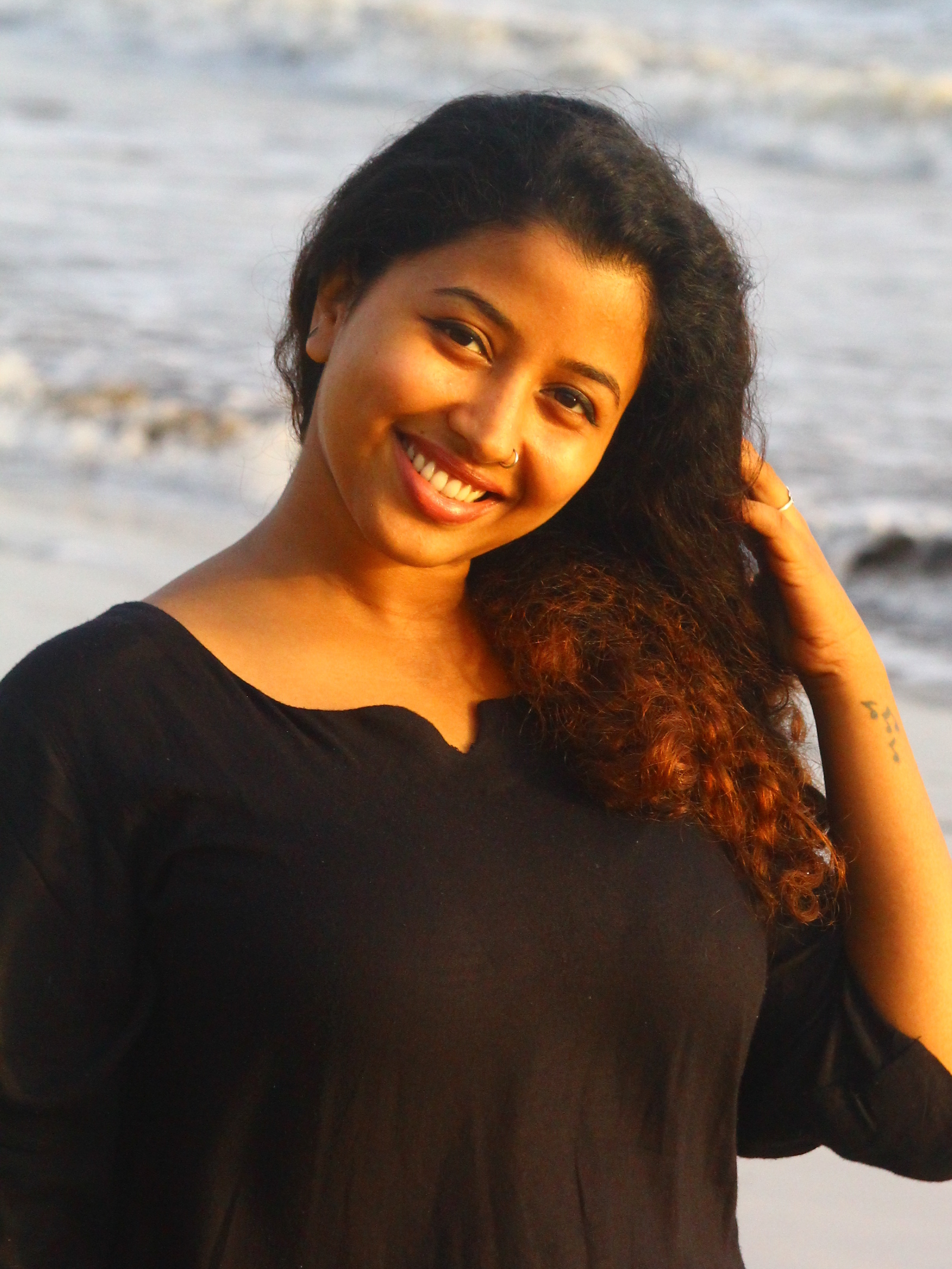
Aanandi Joshi, Best Playback Singer Female

=== Film and director awards ===
Best Film I (Dadasaheb Phalke Award)	Best Director I (Bhalji Pendharkar Award)
Karkhanisanchi Waari	Mangesh Joshi – Karkhanisanchi Waari
Best Film II (Baburao Painter Award)	Best Director II (Raja Paranjape Award)
Frame	Vikram Patwardhan – Frame
Best Film III (Master Vinayak Award)	Best Director III (Raja Thakur Award)
Godavari	Nikhil Mahajan – Godavari
Best Rural Film (Dada Kondke Award)	Best Rural Film Director (Anant Mane Award)
YeRe YeRe Pavsa	Shafaq Khan – YeRe YeRe Pavsa
Best Social Film (V. Shantaram Award)	Best Social Film Director (Datta Dharmadhikari Award)
Baalbhaarti; Ticha Shahar Hona; Ekda Kaay Zala; Godavari; Frame; Karkhanisanchi Waari; Irgal; YeRe YeRe Pavsa; Raakh; Baipan Bhari Deva	Nitin Nandan – Baalbhaarti; Rasika Agashe – Ticha Shahar Hona; Salil Kulkarni – Ekda Kaay Zala; Nikhil Mahajan – Godavari; Vikram Patwardhan – Frame; Mangesh Joshi – Karkhanisanchi Waari; – Irgal; Shafaq Khan – YeRe YeRe Pavsa; Rajesh Chavan – Raakh; Kedar Shinde – Baipan Bhari Deva

=== Acting awards ===
Best Actor (Shahu Modak and Sivaji Ganesan Award)	Best Actress (Smita Patil Award)
Jitendra Joshi – Godavari as Nishikant Deshmukh; Sumeet Raghavan – Ekda Kaay Zala as Kiran; Sandeep Pathak – Raakh	Sonali Kulkarni – Ticha Shahar Hona; Mrunmayee Deshpande – Bebhaan; Smita Tambe – Gaurichya Lagnala Yaycha Haa!
Best Supporting Actor (Chintamanrao Kolhatkar Award)	Best Supporting Actress (Shanta Hublikar and Hansa Wadkar Award)
Amey Wagh – Frame; Priyadarshan Jadhav – Shaktiman as Tanaji; Mohan Agashe – Karkhanisanchi Waari	Hemangi Kavi – Ticha Shahar Hona; Kshitee Jog – Jhimma as Meeta Jahagirdar; Sheetal Pathak – Janani
Best Comedian Male (Damuanna Malvankar Award)	Best Comedian Female (Ratnamala Award)
Bhalchandra Kadam – Pandu as Pandu; Anand Ingale – Luckdown Be Positive; Siddharth Jadhav – Lochya Zaala Re as Maanav	Nirmiti Sawant – Jhimma as Nirmala Konde-Patil; Sukhanya Kulkarni – Baipan Bhari Deva as Sadhana; Shubha Khote – Luckdown Be Positive
Best Child Artist (Gajanan Jagirdar Award)
Aaryan Menghji – Baalbhaarti

=== Debut awards ===
Best Debut Film Production	Best Debut Direction
Aata Vel Zaali; Janani; Luckdown Be Positive	Rasika Agashe – Ticha Shahar Hona; Vikram Patwardhan – Frame; Rudra Karpe – Kulup
Best Debut Actor (Kashinath Ghanekar Award)	Best Debut Actress (Ranjana Deshmukh Award)
Yogesh Khilare – International Falamfok; Rashid Usman Nimbalkar – Irgal; Mahesh Patil – Kulup	Sruti Ubale – Bhraman Dhwani; Shrusti Vandana – Kulup; Shrusti Jadhav – Irgal

=== Music awards ===
Best Playback Singer Male	Best Playback Singer Female
Rahul Deshpande – Godavari for "Khal Khal Goda"; Shubhankar Kulkarni – Ekda Kaay Zala for "Mi Aahe Shyam"; Bhim Shinde – Irgal for "Ye Mazhe Aai"	Aanandi Joshi – Rangiley Funter for "Mann Zhale Baware"; Suvarna Rathod – Baipan Bhari Deva for "Ugdya Punha Jivah"; Aarya Ambekar – Kulup for "Kesari Kesari"
Best Lyricist (G. D. Madgulkar Award)	Best Background Music
Jitendra Joshi – Godavari for "Khal Khal Goda"; Valay Mulgund – Baipan Bhari Deva for "Gadyachya Katyavar"; Sandeep Khare – Ekda Kaay Zala for "Mi Aahe Shyam"	Sarang Kulkarni – Karkhanisanchi Waari; Pankaj Padghan – Aani Baani; AV Prafullachandra – Godavari
Best Music Director (Arun Paudwal Award)	Best Choreographer
Amitraj – Jhimma; Rudra Karpe – Kulup; Salil Kulkarni – Ekda Kaay Zala	Phulwa Khamkar – Luckdown Be Positive for "Chau Mau Chau Mau"; Vitthal Patil – Pandu for "Bhurum Bhurum"; Subhash Nakashe – Baipan Bhari Deva for "Mangalagaur"

=== Writing awards ===
Best Story (Madhusudan Kalelkar Award)	Best Screenplay
Mangesh Joshi, Archana Borhade – Karkhanisanchi Waari; Jayant Pawar – BhauBali; Salil Kulkarni – Ekda Kaay Zala	Rasika Agashe – Ticha Shahar Hona; Vaishali Naik – Baipan Bhari Deva; Nikhil Mahajan, Prajakt Deshmukh – Godavari
Best Dialogue (Acharya Atre Award)
Nitin Nandan – Baalbhaarti; Rashid Usman Nimbalkar – Irgal; Prakash Kunte – Shaktiman

=== Technical awards ===
Best Costume Design	Best Makeup
Shafaq Khan, Rohita More, Nilesh Bhumre – YeRe YeRe Pavsa	Pooja Vishwakarma – Halgat
Best Cinematography (Pandurang Naik Award)	Best Editing
Ranjit Mane – Potra	Paresh Manjrekar – Luckdown Be Positive
Best Sound Mixing	Best Sound Editing
Atul Deshpande – Baipan Bhari Deva	Anil Nikam – Bebhaan
Best Art Direction (Saheb Mama aka Fateh Lal Award)
Bhushan Rahul, Rakesh Kadam – Pandu

== Superlatives ==
Multiple wins
Awards	Film
5	Godavari
4	Karkhanisanchi Waari
4	Baalbhaarti
4	Ticha Shahar Hona
3	Frame
3	YeRe YeRe Pavsa
2	Pandu
2	Jhimma
2	Luckdown Be Positive
1	Aata Vel Zaali
1	International Falamfok
1	Bhraman Dhwani
1	Rangiley Funter
1	Halgat
1	Potra
1	Baipan Bhari Deva
1	Bebhaan
