= Cheluvi =

1992 film by Girish Karnad

- Directed by: Girish Karnad
- Starring: Sushma; Sonali Kulkarni
- Cinematography: Rajiv Menon
- Edited by: Suresh Urs
- Music by: Bhaskar Chandavarkar
- Production company: Sadir Media Pvt. Ltd
- Distributed by: Doordarshan
- Release date: 1992
- Country: India
- Language: Hindi

Cheluvi (transl. Beautiful Girl) is a 1992 Indian Hindi-language drama film directed by Girish Karnad. The film stars Sushma and Sonali Kulkarni with the latter playing the titular role. This film is based on the short story "A Flowering Tree: A Woman's Tale" and won the National Film Award for Best Film on Environment Conservation/Preservation.

The film was included in the 24th International Film Festival of India held in Delhi the following year.

== Plot ==
Two sisters sell blossoms to the villagers who wonder where the flowers came from. One of the sisters, Cheluvi, is told by the other sister to reveal the secret and in turn she turns into a half human half tree being.

== Cast ==
- Sushma as Chenni
- Sonali Kulkarni as Cheluvi
- B. Jayashree as the mother
- Vijaya Yakkundi as the neighbour
- Prashant Rao as Kumar
- Gargi Yakkundi as Shyama
- Geetanjali Kirloskar as Mala
- Girish Karnad as the village headman

== Production ==
Rajiv Menon was chosen as the film's cinematographer after collaborating with Girish Karnad for several documentaries. Sonali Kulkarni was cast as a tree in the film, which marked her film debut.

== Reception ==
Sevanti Ninan of DownToEarth wrote that "Karnad's message is overt rather than subtle. And, precisely because it is a not-so-subtle fable, Cheluvi is a good film to be shown by environmentalists to urban and rural groups. It should communicate their message far more effectively than the dozens of inept documentaries that have been made on the subject".
