= Half Pants Full Pants =

Indian television series

- Genre: Comedy, Drama
- Written by: Anand Suspi
- Directed by: V. K. Prakash
- Starring: Ashwanth Ashokkumar; Sonali Kulkarni; Ashish Vidyarthi; Kartik Vijayan
- Music by: Ratheesh Vega
- Country of origin: India
- Original language: Hindi
- No. of seasons: 1
- No. of episodes: 8

Production
- Producer: Rachita Arya
- Cinematography: R. Ganesh
- Editor: Suresh Urs
- Running time: 25-30 minutes

Original release
- Network: Prime Video
- Release: 16 December 2022

Half Pants Full Pants is a 2022 Indian Hindi comedy-drama show based on Anand Suspi's memoir with the same title, and it was adapted and created by Mani Prasad. Suspi, Prasad, and Gaurav Mishra collaborated on the writing, while V. K. Prakash directed it. The show is produced by OML Studios and features Ashwanth Ashokkumar, Sonali Kulkarni, Ashish Vidyarthi and Kartik Vijan in the lead roles. The show was released on 16 December 2022 on Amazon Prime Video.

== Overview ==
Half Pants Full Pants is a series that originated from Anand Suspi's autobiographical novel of the same name. The adaptation was done by Mani Prasad, with Suspi, Prasad, and Gaurav Mishra contributing to the writing. VK Prakash directed the series. The series plays out in Donigal, a small town in Karnataka before the age of the internet and mobile phones. The story revolves around the ambitious seven-year-old boy, Anand, also known as Dabba, who lives in this town. Along with his friend, Giddi, they embark on adventures that make audiences nostalgic for the good old days of mischief and innocence.

== Cast ==
- Ashwanth Ashokkumar as Anand Subbarao aka Dabba
- Sonali Kulkarni as Padma Subbarao
- Ashish Vidyarthi as Subbarao
- Kartik Vijan as Sriram Subbarao
- Vansh P Keserkar as Giddi

== Production ==
=== Casting ===
The movie stars some actors including Ashish Vidyarthi who portrays the role of Dabba's father and Sonali Kulkarni as her mother. The character of Dabba is played by Ashwanth Ashokkumar.

=== Release ===
Amazon's Prime Video announced the premiere of Half Pants Full Pants on 16 December 2022. The series trailer features a little boy named Anand, aka Dabba, who is different from other kids in his town and has many dreams and interests. Despite facing challenges, he sets out to achieve his dreams. Anand is fascinated by trains and journeys, and his father being a rail driver, gets to enjoy it to the fullest.

== Reception ==
Archika Khurana in her review for The Times of India, describes "Given the abundance of fast-paced content offered by various OTT platforms, Half Pants Full Pants emerges as a calming and blissful trip down memory lane to your bachpan that is unquestionably worthwhile."

In her article for Scroll.in, Nandini Ramnath described the charming demeanor of Ashwanth Kumar, the group of kind-hearted children, and the heartfelt portrayals of the adult characters played by Ashish Vidyarthi and Sonali Kulkarni, who portrayed Anand's parents. These factors helped to maintain the fabricated paradise depicted in the film.

== Episodes ==
=== Season 1 ===
No.	Title	Directed by	Original release date
1	"Magnet King"	VK Prakash	16 December 2022
Dabba is approached by a pair of boys from the nearby convent school to convert their 10-paise coins into magnets. He sees this as an opportunity to become the Magnet King of their small town and begins to dream of the possibilities.
2	"B D Special"	VK Prakash	16 December 2022
At the station, a buzz spreads about the arrival of a new train, the B D Special. Rumors suggest that the train is packed with imported chocolates, causing excitement among the crowd. Dabba, eager to grab his portion, becomes entangled in a plot to steal from the train.
3	"Best Of Md. Rafi"	VK Prakash	16 December 2022
Dabba's father decides to transfer him from the railway school to the convent school. As a result, he meets new acquaintances. Wanting to make amends for his past misbehavior, Dabba does everything he can to save money and purchase a Md. Rafi cassette for his mother's birthday.
4	"Oh God!"	VK Prakash	16 December 2022
Dabba gazes into the toilet and spots some blood. He firmly believes that he is being punished by God for consuming non-vegetarian food and taking money from the temple. Dabba puts all his efforts into pleading for forgiveness from God.
5	"Dabba Lee"	VK Prakash	16 December 2022
After viewing the film Enter The Dragon, Dabba becomes fixated on Bruce Lee and implores his father to allow him to study karate. However, Subbarao declines, prompting Dabba to take matters into his own hands.
6	"Mystery Five"	VK Prakash	16 December 2022
There has been a surge of burglaries in the locality. Subbarao's bicycle and Ashwini's pet dog Timmy have been stolen. In response, Dabba and his companions establish a private investigation firm to track down the group of thieves.
7	"Detective Drummer"	VK Prakash	16 December 2022
Dabba develops an intense passion for drumming and decides to run away from home to join the Sampath Orchestra. Despite his loved ones' frantic search for him, he eventually uncovers the harsh reality behind the troupe. Dabba finds himself stuck with a group of thieves and experiences immense fear for his safety.
8	"Mr. Prime Minister"	VK Prakash	16 December 2022
Dabba feels ashamed when he discovers that his name has been published in the newspaper for being lost. He resolves to do something remarkable to regain his honor. He composes a letter to the Prime Minister. Simultaneously, Subbarao has a chance encounter with a renowned movie director and recognizes that they were childhood pals.

== Awards ==
Half Pants Full Pants has been shortlisted in one category at the 2023 Filmfare OTT Awards. Additionally, at the Indian Television Academy Awards, it has made the Jury's Top 5 in seven categories:

- Best Series - Comedy (OTT)
- Best Director - Comedy (OTT)
- Best Actor - Comedy (OTT)
- Best Actress - Comedy (OTT)
- Best Story (OTT)
- Best DoP (OTT)
- Best Art Director (OTT)
