= Sonali Kulkarni =

Indian actress (born 1974)

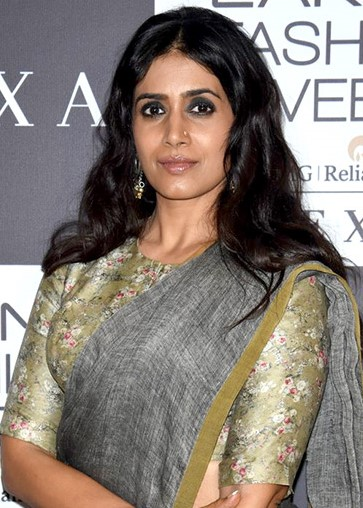
- Kulkarni in 2017
- Born: 3 November 1974 (age 52); Pune, Maharashtra, India
- Occupations: Actor; producer; writer
- Years active: 1992–present
- Notable work: Full list
- Spouse: Chandrakant Kulkarni (divorced) Nachiket Pantvaidya (m. 2010)
- Children: 1
- Family: Deshpande–Subhash–Kulkarni family
- Awards: Full list

Sonali Kulkarni (born 3 November 1974) is an Indian actress, producer, and writer who primarily appears in Marathi, Hindi and few Tamil films. Kulkarni is considered as one of the most accomplished and highest-paid actresses in Marathi cinema, and is a recipient of several accolades including a National Film Award, four Maharashtra State Film Awards and four Filmfare Marathi Awards. She was honoured with V. Shantaram Special Contribution Award in 2010 by the Government of Maharashtra.

She has worked in over 70 films, both experimental and non-experimental, in addition to acting in a few non-Indian films. She is regarded as one of the most versatile Marathi actresses. Although born into a middle-class Maharashtrian family in Pune, Kulkarni was drawn to acting at an early age and had attended Satyadev Dubey's acting workshops. At the age of 18, she made her cinematic debut in the Hindi film Cheluvi (1992). Later, she debuted with Mukta (1994) in Marathi This was followed by critical praise with Doghi (1995), Daayraa (1996), and Gharabaher (1999), the former earning her Maharashtra State Film Award and Filmfare Marathi Award. Subsequently, she starred in the Hindi films Mission Kashmir (2000), Dr. Babasaheb Ambedkar (2000), Pyaar Tune Kya Kiya (2001), Dil Chahta Hai (2001), Taxi Number 9211 (2006), and Singham (2011). She received further acclaim and a National Film Award for her portrayal of a powerful woman in the Marathi-language short film Chaitra (2002).

Kulkarni continued to achieve success with Deool (2011), Pune 52 (2013), The Good Road (2013), Gulabjaam (2018), and Ani... Dr. Kashinath Ghanekar (2018). Moreover, she won three Filmfare Marathi Awards for her roles in the biography Dr. Prakash Baba Amte-The Real Hero (2014), the emotional drama Kachcha Limboo (2017), and the survival drama Pension (2021).

Apart from acting, Kulkarni formerly wrote a weekly column for a supplement of the Marathi daily newspaper Loksatta titled So Kul. In 2010, she published her article book So Kul. She also formed So kul Productions, which produced the Marathi–English play WhileLily & Night.

== Early life ==
Kulkarni was born on 3 November 1974 in Pune, Maharashtra. Her father is an engineer, and she has two older brothers, Sandeep and Sandesh. She attended Abhinava Vidyalaya and graduated from Fergusson College, where she majored in political science and received a scholarship in Marathi literature. She trained in Bharatanatyam for eleven years and in classical music for four. For her interest in acting, she attended a workshop by Satyadev Dubey, after which she and Sandesh formed a theatre group called Samanvay. Sandesh is a director and is married to actress Amruta Subhash.

== Acting career ==
=== Film debut and early work (1992–1999) ===
Kulkarni made her screen debut as the titular character in Girish Karnad's Hindi film Cheluvi. Karnad first saw her when she was still in college and approached her for the project. The film is based on "A Flowering Tree: A Woman's Tale", in which she portrays a poor young woman with a hidden magical ability that allows her to shift into a tree that blooms with exotic flowers.

The first Marathi film to star Kulkarni was Mukta (1994), which was directed by Jabbar Patel. It is the narrative of an upper-caste girl and a lower-caste guy who struggle with their caste's contradictions. It is recognised as one of the most significant Marathi films made between 1993 and 1998. The same year, she appeared in the Tamil romantic film May Maadham, which was a commercial failure. Mani Ratnam had recommended her name to the director. She then acted in the NFDC-produced film Doghi (1995), for which she got Maharashtra State Film Award and Filmfare Marathi Award for Best Actress.

In 1996, Kulkarni starred in the first installment of Amol Palekar's trilogy on sexuality, Daayraa. The story revolves around a love relationship between a transvestite dancer and a gang-raped lady who starts dressing up as a male. The film had its world premiere at the 1996 Toronto International Film Festival and was also shown at the London Film Festival, Hamptons International Film Festival, Melbourne International Film Festival, New York Film Festival, and Vancouver Asian Film Festival. However, due to its controversial topic, it was not screened in Indian theatres. The film received positive reviews and gained her widespread acclaim. At the Festival de Valenciennes, she received the Best Actor Award—Grand Prix du Jury. Her other releases during this time were the English-language film Vrindavan Film Studios by Italian filmmaker Lamberto Lambertini and the award-winning Marathi political drama Gharabaher.

She also collaborated with Doordarshan on a Hindi film, Gulabari, which aired in 1995, as well as television shows such as Badalte Rishtey and Kata Rute Kunala in 1996. The latter received RAPA Awards for Best Television Performance of the Year. She was also seen in one episode (Kya Yahi Pyaar Hai - Directed by Tanuja Chaturvedi) of the Star Bestsellers TV Series, which ran on Star Plus from 1999 to 2000.

=== Breakthrough and commercial setback (2000–2008) ===
In 2000, Kulkarni's first release was Vidhu Vinod Chopra's Mission Kashmir. She portrayed the roles of Sanjay Dutt's wife and Hrithik Roshan's foster mother. Saisuresh Sivaswamy from Rediff, calling her a "real scene-stealer," wrote, "She excels in a role that brings out the entire gamut of a mother's emotions, and finally gives her life to save her husband's." Filmfare critic Suman Tarafdar observed, "Kulkarni, as the belle from Lucknow, does the loving wife and mother with a touch of realism not generally seen in Indian mainstream cinema." She was nominated in the Best Supporting Actress category at several award ceremonies, including the Filmfare awards, IIFA awards, and Screen awards. That same year, she saw the commercial release of Dr. Babasaheb Ambedkar, an English-Hindi bilingual film on B. R. Ambedkar's struggle to liberate the downtrodden classes. She was cast as Ramabai Ambedkar, the first wife of Ambedkar, who was played by Mammootty. This was her second project with Jabbar Patel.

In 2001, she appeared in two successful Hindi films: Rajat Mukherjee's romantic thriller Pyaar Tune Kya Kiya, which received critical acclaim and grossed ₹ 281 million (US$3.5 million) at the box office, and Farhan Akhtar's coming-of-age comedy-drama film Dil Chahta Hai, in which she starred opposite Saif Ali Khan and the film went on to become the year's fifth highest-grossing film.

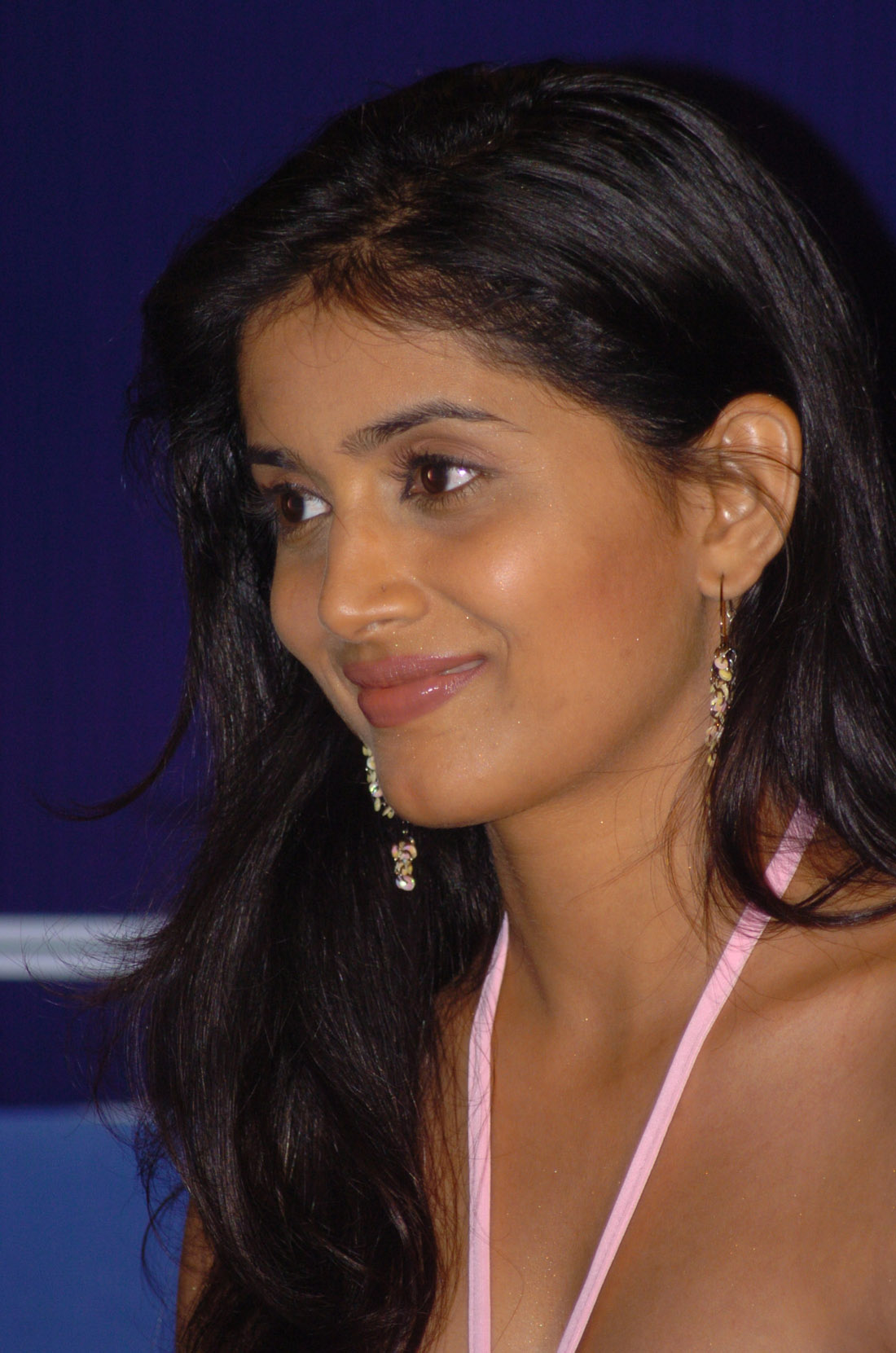
Kulkarni at 36th International Film Festival of India in Goa.

Mehul Kumar's Kitne Door Kitne Paas, critically acclaimed musical ensemble Dil Vil Pyar Vyar, and Agni Varsha, a silver screen adaptation of Girish Karnad's Mahabharata play The Fire and The Rain, being box-office failures in 2002. Despite her unsuccessful Hindi films, she received a Special Mention – Non-Feature Film at the 49th National Film Awards for her role in the Marathi culturally diverse short film Chaitra. Based on author G.A. Kulkarni's story of the same name, the tale is about a proud woman, her beautiful redemption from an unfair societal insult, and her tragic bad luck, set during the Haldi-Kumkum festival.

In 2004, she was seen in Devrai, directed by filmmaker duo Sumitra Bhave–Sunil Sukthankar. She got second-best actress at the 42nd Maharashtra State Film Awards for her performance as Seena, the sister of a man with schizophrenia who is battling to come to terms with his sickness. She then starred as one of four widowers in White Rainbow, a film set in the Hindu holy city of Vrindavan in north India. Taran Adarsh of Bollywood Hungama wrote, "Sonali Kulkarni may not be in complete form, but she makes a sincere effort." She also appeared in Makarand Deshpande's Hanan and Gurinder Chadha's Bride and Prejudice.

She made her Gujarati cinema debut in 2005 with Love Is Blind, which went on to win eleven Gujarat State Film Awards. Her next film was Fuoco Su di Me, an international Italian language film in which she co-starred alongside Omar Sharif and Massimiliano Varrese. For her portrayal, she was awarded Best Actress at the 2006 Milan International Film Festival.

In 2006, Kulkarni was seen in Milan Luthria's comedy thriller Taxi No. 9211, in which she starred with Nana Patekar and John Abraham. She featured as Sunita Shastri, Patekar's wife, in the film. Taran Adarsh of Bollywood Hungama called her performance "exceptional," adding, "Her sequences with Nana are commendable." The film earned positive reviews from critics and was a moderate box office success. She was nominated for a Stardust award. Kulkarni went on to feature in the romantic comedy I See You and Sakhi, as well as the ensemble films Sirf and Via Darjeeling and the anthology films Darna Zaroori Hai and Mumbai Cutting. She was one of the participants in the reality shows Jhalak Dikhhla Jaa 2 and Fear Factor: Khatron Ke Khiladi 1.

=== Unconventional roles and critical acclaim (2009–2013) ===
Kulkarni had eight releases in 2009, the first of which was Gajendra Ahire's Gulmohar, in which she portrayed a devoted and supportive wife. Gabhricha Paus, written and directed by Satish Manwar, was her next release. The film depicts the suicides of cotton farmers in Maharashtra's Vidarbha area. Gabhricha Paus was highly appreciated at the Rotterdam International Film Festival and it became the only Indian film to get a distribution prize of 15,000 Euros from the Hubert Bals Fund. Following its premiere, it was chosen for several film festivals, including the Vancouver International Film Festival, the Durban International Film Festival, the Goa Marathi Film Festival, and the Kolhapur International Film Festival. She next played an Indian television star newsreader in Delhi in the highly praised Mohandas, a nightmarish drama of identity theft that culminates into a humiliating betrayal of governmental corruption and conspiracy. The film got nominations at both the South Asian International Film Festival and the Fribourg International Film Festival. Later, she co-starred alongside Milind Soman in the short story Aushadh Ghenara Manus in the anthology film Gandha, a combination of three separate stories linked by the common component of the human sense of smell. Well Done, Abba, Love Khichdi, and Shadow are among her other films from the year.

In 2010, she appeared in films such as Ringa Ringa and The Camp. In 2011, Kulkarni earned her second nomination for an IIFA award for her performance in Rohit Shetty's Singham as an honest inspector's wife seeking justice for her husband's suicide. Komal Nahta of Koimoi found her "excellently restrained." Next, her role in Deool as Vahini, a simple woman with a strong faith in God and a commitment to her family, was a box-office blockbuster. The romantic thriller Pratibimb, starring Ankush Chaudhari, was her last release of the year. She was pregnant at the time of the shoot. She won the Zee Chitra Gaurav Puraskar for Best Actress for the film.

In 2013, she worked with debutant director Nikhil Mahajan in the thriller Pune 52, as the frustrated wife of an unsuccessful man. The film was a commercial hit. Then she reprised the role of Sharmila Tagore from the original in Konkanastha, a remake of director Mahesh Manjrekar's own film Viruddh. Her last release was the Gujarati film, The Good Road. It was selected as the Indian entry for the Best Foreign Language Film at the 86th Academy Awards, becoming the first Gujarati film ever selected.

=== Established actress and commercial success (2014–present) ===
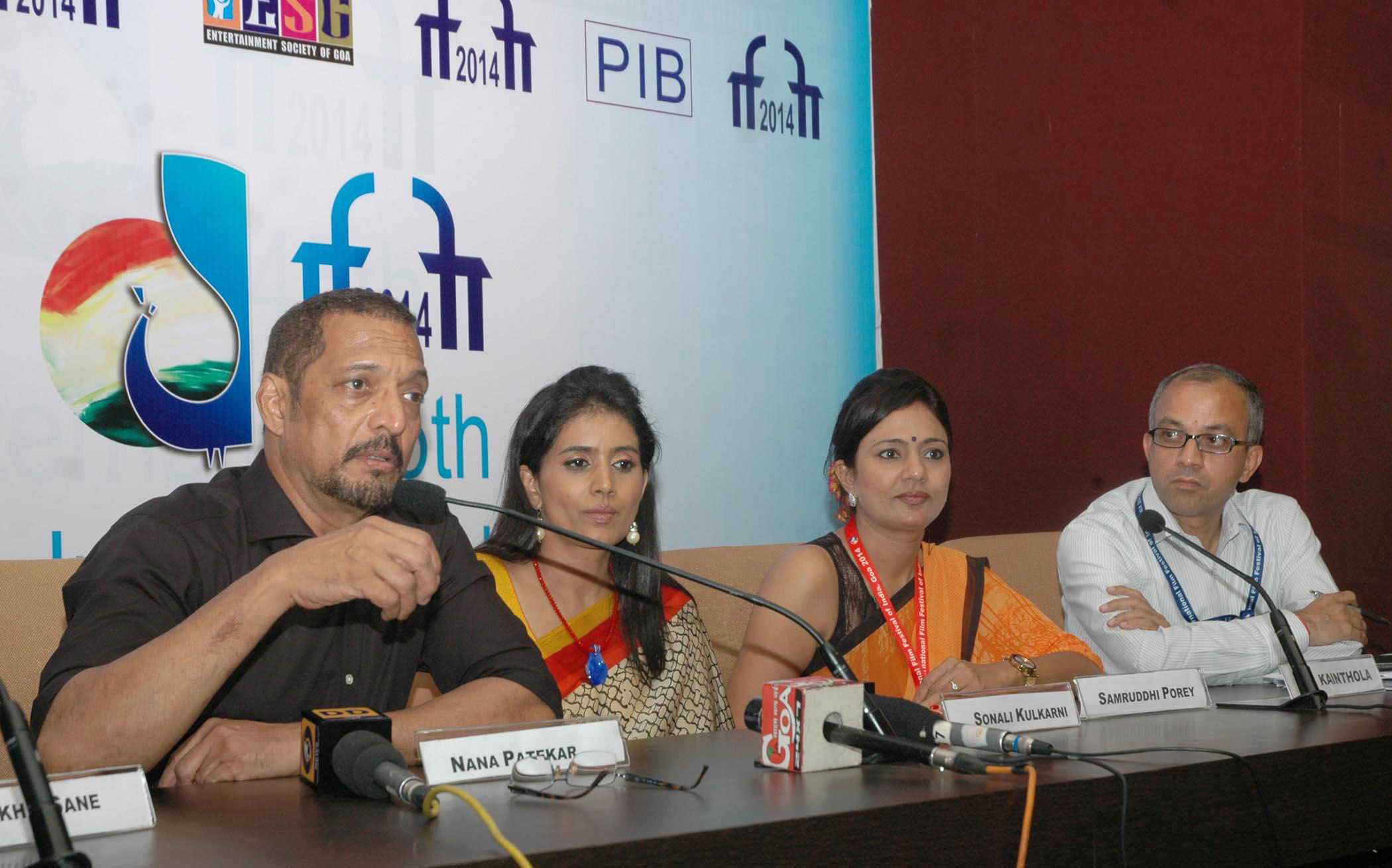
Kulkarni pictured with Nana Patekar (left) and Samruddhi Porey at a press conference for Dr. Prakash Baba Amte - The Real Hero in 2014

Following that, Kulkarni appeared in Dr. Prakash Baba Amte – The Real Hero, Aga Bai Arechyaa 2, and Sugar Salt Ani Prem. The former received critical praise and a Filmfare Award for Best Actress for her portrayal of Mandakini Amte, a real-life medical practitioner and social worker, in the biopic. Surabhi Redkar of koimoi stated, "Sonali lives up to it as she easily gets into the character of Manda, who is a lovable character in the film." Mihir Bhanage of TOI noted, "It is one of those roles that utilised her acting prowess to the fullest." The film was one of the top Marathi hits of 2014.

In 2017, Kulkarni featured in Govind Nihalani's Marathi film Ti ani Itar, which was a screen adaptation of Manjula Padmanabhan's play Lights Out. Her second release was Prasad Oak's directorial black and white film Kachcha Limboo, based on Jaywant Dalvi's novel Runanubandha. The film, set in the 1980s, is about a couple's ongoing battle to care for their 15-year-old mentally challenged child, who begins to develop sexual impulses. She portrayed a simple, family-oriented woman opposite Ravi Jadhav. Both the film and her performance received great acclaim. TOI's Mihir Bhanage writes, "Kulkarni pulls off a rather complex character with grace..." Namrata Joshi of The Hindu praised her for "bringing out the requisite nuances and predicaments of her character." Her performance earned her third Filmfare Marathi Award and her second Zee Chitra Gaurav Puraskar in the category of Best Actress. She also acted in Poster Boys, the Hindi remake of the Marathi film of the same name, starring Sunny Deol and Bobby Deol.

In 2018, her chemistry with Siddharth Chandekar in Gulabjaam was praised. Mihir Bhange of TOI called the film "a tasty meal that leaves a sweet aftertaste," adding, "she [Kulkarni] is the salt in the film; that bit without which the recipe would be bland and incomplete." Yogesh Pawar of DNA stated, "She brings to her Radha Agarkar an organic vulnerability and strength that sets the tone for her character's trajectory." Alok Deshpande, The Hindu reviewer, wrote: "Kulkarni has delivered one of the best performances of her career in Gulabjaam. Her anger, helplessness, rare smiles, and surrendering to the past, paint a memorable Radha." Her subsequent films, Hope Aur Hum and Madhuri, garnered mixed reviews, although her acting was praised. She then portrayed veteran Hindi and Marathi actress Sulochana Latkar in the biography Ani... Dr. Kashinath Ghanekar.

Kulkarni played a widow and mother to a young boy in Pension (2021), a drama about a family of three who relies heavily on the pension that the elderly lady receives as a result of her late husband's service. She was awarded Best Actress by the Critics at the Filmfare Marathi Awards. In April 2021, she presented Sony TV's popular real-life-based crime show, Crime Patrol Satark: Justice Reloaded. In the same year, she made her OTT debut in the web series Mumbai Diaries 26/11 and The Whistleblower on Amazon Prime Video and SonyLIV, respectively. The following year, she appeared in the Marathi comedy-drama Dil Dimag Aur Batti, a film paying homage to classic Bollywood movies of the 1970s and 80s. While the film received mixed reviews, Sanjay Gaware of Lokmat praised her performance alongside Dilip Prabhavalkar, stating, "Kulkarni impresses in all three of her characters, particularly in the climax, where she shines in a Koli action sequence." In Ticha Shahar Hona, Rasika Agashe's critically acclaimed drama exploring class divisions, she portrayed an upper-middle-class woman in Mumbai whose life transforms after an unexpected encounter challenges her perceptions of social hierarchy. The film was screened at several prestigious festivals worldwide, including the Toronto International Women Film Festival, Cannes Film Festival, and Boden International Film Festival, before its theatrical release in April 2024. Her performance received widespread acclaim, earning her a third Maharashtra State Film Award for Best Actress.She also played a caring and supportive mother in Amazon Prime Video's comedy-drama series Half Pants Full Pants. Kulkarni's performance was lauded, with Shubham Kulkarni of Koimoi.com writing, "Kulkarni brings the stillness needed in the show and has an amazing screen presence." She was also nominated for Best Actress – Comedy at the Indian Television Academy Awards. In the same year, she appeared in the MX Player crime thriller Dharavi Bank, set in Mumbai’s infamous Dharavi slum, where she played a selfies state chief minister alongside Suniel Shetty and Vivek Oberoi in a gripping tale of power struggle between a ruthless gangster and law enforcement. The Times of India critic Archika Khurana praised her performance as "a never-before-seen avatar" and wrote, "When it comes to retaining her position, she is both humble and mean at the same time."

In 2023, she replaced Rajesh Tailang as the RAW Chief in Voot's spy thriller Crackdown. She received mixed reviews for her performance; The Times of India critic Archika Khurana described it as "competent," while Vijayalakshmi Narayanan of The Free Press Journal wrote, "Sonali is not compelling enough, and her familial conflict seems misplaced." She also appeared as a widowed mother in Avinash Arun’s critically acclaimed series School of Lies, for which critic Ronak Kotecha wrote, "She impresses with her significant cameo appearance." That year, she had a single film release, the not-so-well-received family drama Sshort and Ssweet. In 2024, she played a supporting role as an aunt to the title character in the drama Love, Sitara, alongside Sobhita Dhulipala and Rajeev Siddhartha. Mimansa Shekhar of Times Now compared her to "the flow of water" and said, "It isn't rocket-science to know why Sonali Kulkarni is a gem of an actor." Kartik Bharadwaj of The Indian Express wrote, "Her performance dissects the cool, assertive aunt trope and reveals a vulnerable, lonely woman." She was also seen in brief roles in the Hindi comedy Jo Tera Hai Woh Mera Hai and the sports biopic Chandu Champion.

Next, she appeared in the Marathi crime thriller Manvat Murders, directed by Ashish Bende, the series is based on real incidents from the Marathwada region, where multiple women were murdered in a village. She portrayed a woman unable to have children who becomes involved in ritualistic killings alongside Uttamrao Barhate (played by Makarand Anaspure) in pursuit of hidden wealth. She described her role as one of the most challenging of her career. Her performance received rave reviews, Archi Sengupta of Leisure Byte stated, "Kulkarni brings a desperate yet threatening antagonist to the floor," while Manas Mitul of Gadgets 360 called her performance "one of her finest" and added, "she has done an exceptional job of portraying this unabashed faith in an immoral cause... she'll make you uncomfortable every time she is on the screen." She won the NDTV Marathi Entertainment Awards for Best Actress.

== Other work ==
=== Theatre and production ===
Kulkarni has been in a number of theater plays throughout the years. She played Laxmi in Sakharam Binder, the most controversial play by Vijay Tendulkar, which was directed by her brother Sandesh Kulkarni and featured Sayaji Shinde as the title character.

In 2014, Kulkarni founded her production company, Sokul, and produced the plays White Lilly & Night Rider in Marathi and Hinglish, in which she also performed. Later, during Baba Amte's centenary year, she presented a special show called Karunopanished. As a tribute to Baba Amte's literary legacy, Kulkarni and Sachin Khedekar recited portions from novels written by him.

=== Writing ===
Kulkarni began writing for Viva, a supplement to the Marathi daily newspaper Loksatta, in June 2005 and continued till May 2007. She used to write a column every week called So Kul. Her articles for the modern Maharashtrian lady have received a lot of attention throughout the years. The newspaper and Rajhans Prakashan combined those writings and released a book, So kul..., in 2010. Nana Patekar said during the book's launch, "Whenever I read her articles, I feel she is talking to me. There is so much simplicity in her writing."

== Personal life ==
She was married to the film actor Chandrakant Kulkarni for a brief time but later got divorced. After a brief relationship with Nachiket Pantvaidya, head of Sony Entertainment Television, she married him in 2010. The couple has a daughter, born in 2011.

== Media image ==
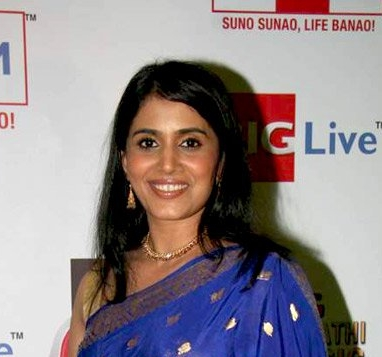
Kulkarni in 2011

Kulkarni is considered as one of the most popular and highest-paid actresses in Marathi cinema. Her performance in Kachcha Limboo is regarded as one of the "100 Greatest Performances of the Decade" by Film Companion. In 2018, she won the Lokmat Maharashtrian of the Year Award. She is one of the most followed Marathi actress on Instagram. In 2024, Kulkarni acted as a jury member at the KASHISH Pride Film Festival, a LGBTQ film festival.

== Accolades ==
Kulkarni has received four Filmfare Awards Marathi: Best Actress – Marathi for Doghi, Dr. Prakash Baba Amte – The Real Hero, and Kachcha Limboo and Best Actress Critics – Marathi for Pension.
