= Love Is Blind (2005 film) =

- Official Poster
- Original title: લવ ઇઝ બ્લાઇન્ડ
- Directed by: Vipul Sharma
- Story by: Mulraj Rajda
- Produced by: Arpit Mehta; Meeta Shah; Sandip Patel
- Starring: Sandeep Patel; Sonali Kulkarni
- Music by: Kardam Thakar (Background score:Hyacinth D'souza)
- Production company: Filmcity (Gujarat) Entertainment
- Release date: 2005
- Country: India
- Language: Gujarati
- Budget: ₹1.26 crore (US$130,000)

Love Is Blind is a 2005 Indian Gujarati film directed by Vipul Sharma, starring Sandeep Patel and Sonali Kulkarni. It was the first Gujarati film released in the multiplexes. The film narrates a love story of Anand (Patel), a blind violin player, and Amisha (Kulkarni), a writer. It won eleven of the Gujarat State Film Awards in 2005 and 2006, including the Best Film Award and the Best Director Award.

== Plot ==
Anand (Patel) is a violin player who suffers greatly due to his blindness. He can't accept his father's second marriage and lives separately since a young age due to estrangement with his step-mother. Once, he becomes the victim of a writer, Amisha's (Kulkarni), wrath because of his blindness. When Amisha realizes the reality, her sympathy turns into love gradually. When Amisha's family members learn about their relationship, they become angry with her. But her grandfather (Pandit) takes her side always. When Anand goes to Amisha's home with a marriage proposal, he is rusticated from the home and called blind. To take revenge, Anand gets drunk with his friends and creates commotion, and speaks swear words at Amisha's home. Thus Anand and Amisha are separated. Anand doesn't marry a girl suggested by his step-mother and suffers in Amisha's separation. He elopes with Amisha with his friends on the very day of Amisha's marriage.

== Cast ==
- Sonali Kulkarni as Amisha
- Sandeep Patel as Anand
- Sudha Chandran
- Devendra Pandit
- Mehul Buch
- Hasmuk Bhavsar
- Jyotin Dave
- Bimal Trivedi
- Zalak Thakkar
- Tushar Dave
- Pragnya Trivedi
- Baby Tarika
- Mayur Vakani

== Production ==
The film was made on budget of ₹1.26 crore (US$130,000). It was shot in 27 days at various locations including in Mumbai and at Adalaj Stepwell and Sun Temple, Modhera. Kulkarni learned Gujarati under Trishala Patel.

== Music ==
The music was composed by Kardam Thakar. It featured songs like "Bandh Aankhoma", "Prem Pyar Ishq Ke Asashiqi Kaho", "Love Is Blind" and "O Mara Saathi Tu Gaa".

== Release ==
Love Is Blind was the first Gujarati film released in the multiplexes.

== Accolades ==
The film won eleven of the Gujarat state film awards of 2005-06 instituted by the Government of Gujarat, including the Best Film. Sharma received the Best Director award.
