= Shadow (2009 Hindi film) =

- Directed by: Rohit Nayyar
- Written by: Bobby Khan
- Produced by: Nasser Khan; Shamsad Alam
- Starring: Nasser Khan; Milind Soman; Sonali Kulkarni; Hrishita Bhatt
- Music by: Anand Raj Anand
- Release date: 21 August 2009
- Country: India
- Language: Hindi

Shadow, The Dark Side of Truth, is a 2009 Hindi film directed by Rohit Nayyar, written by Bobby Khan and produced by Nasser Khan and Shamsad Alam. The film cast includes Nasser Khan, Milind Soman, Sonali Kulkarni, and Hrishitaa Bhatt.

== Cast ==
- Nasser Khan as Arjun Sherawat (serial killer) / Raju (garage owner)
- Milind Soman as undercover cop Rahul Kapoor (fake journalist)
- Sonali Kulkarni as Inspector Sanjana Singh Rajpoot (Raju's love interest)
- Hrishitaa Bhatt as journalist Sheetal Pradhan (Rahul's love interest)
- Samir Aftab as Abhishek (Home Minister's assistant)
- Sachin Khedekar as Home Minister Shiv Shankar
- Aditya Lakhia as Tillu (Raju's friend, Sheetal's brother)
- Gulshan Pandey as Jacky (Raju's friend)
- Vishwajeet Pradhan as Police Commissioner M. C. Singh Rajpoot (Sanjana's father)
- Gargi Patel as Devki Singh Rajpoot (Sanjana's mother)
- Mushtaque Khan as Habib Faisal
- Virat D. Gupta as Dr. Vora
- Rosa Catalano in an item number
- Jasbir Thandi as Hrishita's brother

== Music ==
1. "Rabba Rabba Mere Rabba" – Roop Kumar Rathod
2. "Ashiqui Ni Chaldi" – Anushka Manchanda, Anand Raj Anand
3. "Jo Chala Gaya Vo Pal" – Akriti Kakkar, Sukhwinder Singh
4. "Khumaariyaan Khumaariyaan" – Sunidhi Chauhan
5. "Masti Masti Masti" – Sunidhi Chauhan
6. "Tere Hum Hai Dewane" – Akriti Kakkar, Anand Raj Anand
