= Bachelor Girls =

2016 film by Shikha Makan

Bachelor Girls is a 2016 English-language Indian documentary, exposing the stigma faced by the single woman in the modern Indian city of Mumbai. It is directed by filmmaker Shikha Makan. She is a psychology graduate from Delhi University, former radio jockey and theatre artist.

== Selections ==
- Official Selection 35th CAAM Fest 2017, (San Francisco International Asian American Film Festival)
- Official Selection 40th Asian American International Film Festival, New York, 2017
- Official Selection 14th Indian Film Festival, Stuttgart, Germany, 2017
- Vancouver International South Asian Film Festival, 2016
- International Madurai Film Festival, 2016
- Chennai International Documentary & Short Film Festival, curated screening by WMF, 2017
- Nazariya, International Women Film Festival, Hyderabad
