= Baji (2015 film) =

2015 Indian film

- Theatrical Poster
- Directed by: Nikhil Mahajan
- Written by: Nikhil Mahajan; Suhrud Godbole; Shrirang Godbole (dialogue)
- Produced by: Vivek Rangachari; Amit Ahirrao; Suhrud Godbole; Nikhil Mahajan
- Starring: Shreyas Talpade; Amruta Khanvilkar; Jitendra Joshi
- Cinematography: Vasudeo Rane
- Edited by: Abhijit Deshpande
- Music by: Atif Afzal
- Production companies: DAR Motion Pictures; Virtue Entertainment; Blue Drop Films; IME Motion Pictures
- Distributed by: DAR Motion Pictures; Virtue Entertainment
- Release date: 6 February 2015
- Running time: 170 Minutes
- Country: India
- Language: Marathi
- Budget: ₹4 crore (US$420,000)
- Box office: ₹10.79 crore (US$1.1 million) (2nd Week)

Baji is a 2015 Indian Marathi-language superhero film written and directed by Nikhil Mahajan and produced by Vivek Rangachari and Amit Ahirrao under the banner DAR Motion Pictures and Virtue Entertainment and it is the first ever Marathi superhero film.

The film stars Shreyas Talpade and Amruta Khanvilkar in lead roles while Jitendra Joshi plays the main antagonist.

This film marks the comeback of Shreyas Talpade in the Marathi film industry after seven years. It was said that director Ravi Jadhav, Nagraj Manjule and Girija Oak would be seen in the film.

== Plot ==
The story of the film is based on the legend of a man who took it upon himself to protect the common man against oppression and injustice. His sword, his bow-arrow and his white stallion live on to define him as Baji. Baji is known to guard and protect the people in his village. He fights to restore justice from a wicked villager named Martand, who is greedy to find the treasure hidden under the village.

== Cast ==
- Shreyas Talpade as Baji / Chiddvilas(Chidu) / Akash
- Amruta Khanvilkar as Gauri
- Jitendra Joshi as Martand
- Ila Bhate as Chidu's mother
- Sandesh Kulkarni as Inspector Mahesh
- Nagraj Manjule as Inspector Mahesh
- Priyadarshan Jadhav as Pandya
- Neha Shitole as Goda
- Uday Lagoo as Doctor
- Shrikant as Teacher
- Rajesh More as Dattu Kaka
- Pushakar Lonarkar as Golu
- Sunil Godbole as Priest
- Chandrakant Dhumaal as an old man
- Pratik as young villain
- Anvay Bendre as Kodano
- Arya Abhyankar as Young Gauri
- Mitali Joshi as Gauri's mother
- Sandip Pathak as Dacoit leader
- Stunt Silva as Dacoit
- Ravi Jadhav as Engineer (guest appearance)
- Girija Oak as a girl in the carnival (guest appearance)
- Shruti Marathe in an item number Masoli
- Mrinmayee Godbole in Aala Aala Re Baji song

== Production ==
The film is being produced by Arun Rangachari, Vivek Rangachari, Aayush Maheshwari, Amit Ahirrao, Suhrud Godbole, Hrishikesh Kulkarni, Nikhil Mahajan under DAR Motion Pictures, Virtue Entertainment Blue Drop Films and IME Motion Pictures production banner and the film is also presented by DAR Motion Pictures and Virtue Entertainment. Baji is the second installment of Arun Rangachari and Vivek Rangachari under DAR Motion Pictures banner in the Marathi film industry. After, they produced two Marathi films Lalbaug Parel and Teecha Baap Tyacha Baap.

The stunts in the film was handle by action director Stunt Silva, who also did a small role into the film.

== Soundtrack ==
Baji

Soundtrack album by Atif Afzal
- Released: 15 January 2015
- Genre: Feature film soundtrack
- Length: 24:58
- Language: Marathi
- Label: Zee Music Company

Atif Afzal chronology
Horn Please (2013)	Baji (2015)	That Sunday (2015)
External audio
- Audio Jukebox on YouTube

Singles from Baji
- 1. "Aala Aala Re Baji" Released: 30 December 2014; 2. "Majha Baji" Released: 12 January 2015; 3. "Masoli" Released: 12 January 2015

The film's soundtrack and background score is composed by Atif Afzal and lyrics are penned by Shrirang Godbole.

Kollywood Singer Chinmayi makes her Marathi debut with this film. The first song, "Aala Aala Re Baji", sung by Shalmali Kholgade & Adarsh Shinde, was released on 30 December 2014. The second song, "Majha Baji", sung by Chinmayi who makes her debut in Marathi with the song, was released on 6 January 2015. The third Song, "Masoli", sung by Bela Shende, was released on 9 January 2015.

=== Track listing ===
Baji
No.	Title	Singer(s)	Length
1.	"Aala Aala Re Baji"	Adarsh Shinde & Shalmali Kholgade	3:20
2.	"Majha Baji"	Chinmayi	3:55
3.	"Masoli"	Bela Shende	3:27
4.	"Baji O Baji"	Adarsh Shinde	4:17
5.	"Shravan Shravan"	Atif Afzal & Chinmayi	3:44
6.	"Ye Na"	Abhijeet Sawant	3:40
7.	"Majha Baji (Unplugged)"	Chinmayi	3:55
Total length:			24:58

== Release ==
The film was released on 6 February 2015. It was released in 418 screens in Maharashtra along with Goa, Gujarat, Madhya Pradesh, Karnataka & Delhi. The first look Teaser of the film was released in theatres along with Shreyas Talpade's Home Production film Poshter Boyz and on Internet on 1 August 2014. Girish Kulkarni has rendered his voice to the first look teaser. Theatrical trailer of the film was released on 8 December 2014 on YouTube.

== Box office ==
Baji opened to decent response at the box office. It collected ₹0.80 crore (US$83,000) on first day,₹1.10 crore (US$110,000) on second day and ₹1.60 crore (US$170,000) on third day.Thus it collected ₹3.50 crore (US$360,000) in its first weekend.The collections dropped on weekdays.It collected ₹1.98 crore (US$210,000) on weekdays and collected ₹5.48 crore (US$570,000) in its first week of release.

== Accolades ==
International Marathi Film Festival Awards 2015

- Best Action - Stunt Silva
