= A Flowering Tree: A Woman's Tale =

Short story by A. K. Ramanujan

Book cover of A Flowering Tree and Other Oral Tales from India

"A Flowering Tree" is a short story written by A. K. Ramanujan in his 1997 book A Flowering Tree and Other Oral Tales from India. In actuality, it is a Karnataka folklore told by women which was translated by A. K. Ramanujan from Kannada to English. The story was collected in several versions in the Karnataka region over the span of twenty years by Ramanujan and his fellow folklorists. It is a woman-centred tale and attempts to establish a sisterhood between women and nature. This has been regularly done by many feminist writers.

Like most folktales from around the world, A Flowering Tree synthesizes two discrete elements: first, an impossible narrative (a girl turns into a tree; a prince marries a peasant), and second, mythic archetypes which resonate deeply with all of us, no matter what our beliefs. According to Ramannujan himself who analysed the folk tale while translating it, "It is a story of woman's ecology and vulnerability of her emerging sexuality..."

This was published posthumously and edited by Stuart Blackburn and Alan Dundes along with other folktales compiled and translated by Ramanujan. His story was adapted into an opera by John Adams in 2006.

== Plot summary ==
There lived a poor woman in a certain town with her two daughters. The younger daughter decided to help her impoverished family. She turned into a beautiful tree by performing a strange ritual with her older sister. They carefully performed the ritual which required two pitchers of water – one to transform the younger to a tree and the other back to human form. Her older sister plucked flowers from the transformed tree making sure that she doesn't damage any other part of the tree. She then converts her younger sister to human form. They weaved the fragrant flowers into garlands and sold them at the King's palace. They decided to keep this a secret from their mother and saved the money for the future.

One day the prince discovers the garlands in the palace and gets curious about their origin. He followed the girls back to their house. The next morning at dawn, he went to their house and hid behind a tree and eventually saw the secret origin of flowers. He asked his parents (King and Queen) to marry the girl that sold flowers and told them the secret. The minister summoned the girls' mother and presented the proposal. She couldn't help but agree. Later at her house, the younger daughter had to demonstrate how she transformed into a tree to pacify her angry mother.

After the wedding, several nights passed without him speaking to her or touching her. Finally, he makes his demand: she must do her transformation for him. Ashamed, she resists but finally relents and performs the ceremony for him. Her envious sister-in-law watched her do the transformation one night. She forced her to transform into a tree and broke her branches while plucking the flowers. They also ignored the water ritual and poured water on her indifferently, here and there. When the princess changed to human form, she had no hands or feet. She had only half a body. She was a wounded carcass. She crawled into a gutter.

Next morning a cotton wagon driver spotted her and rescued her from the gutter. He covered her naked body with a turban cloth. He left her at a ruined pavilion in a town. Her husband's elder sister was married to the King of this town. The palace servants informed the queen about her. She was brought to the palace, bathed, healed and kept at the main door as a "thing" for decoration. Meanwhile, the prince distraught at his wife's disappearance assumes that she left him due to his arrogance. Full of remorse, he turned into a beggar and wandered across the country.

After a long time, the prince haggard and unrecognizable reached his elder sister's town. In shock, the Queen recognized her brother and brought him to the palace where he was bathed and fed. He never uttered a single word. His sister was worried and tried all sorts of ways to make him speak. One day she sent the half-body of his wife in the hope that the beauty would move him. He immediately recognized his lost wife. She told him the complete incident. She asked him to perform the ritual and fix all her broken branches and then transform her back to human form in the hope that she would be normal again. The method worked. The Queen (his elder sister) bid them farewell.

The King (prince's father) was overjoyed at the return of his long-lost son and daughter-in-law. After discovering the bitter truth, the king had seven barrels of burning lime poured into a great pit and threw his youngest daughter into it. All the people who saw this said to themselves, "After all, every wrong has its punishment."

== Themes ==
According to A. K. Ramanujan, one of its resonates with our present concerns with ecology and conservation. Each time the younger daughter becomes a tree, she begs the person who is with her to treat it/her gently and not to pluck anything more than the flowers. The warning for not plucking more than what is required is in coherence with the practice of sustainable development. There is also the suggestion that a tree is vulnerable to careless handling like a woman. A tree that has come to flower or fruit will not be cut down; it is treated as a mother, a woman who has given birth.

=== Ecofeminism ===
This folktale shows a strong connection between women and nature. The metaphoric connections between a tree and a woman are many and varied in the culture. A relevant one here is that the words for "flowering" and "menstruation" are the same in languages like Sanskrit and Tamil. In Sanskrit, a menstruating woman is called a puspavati, "a woman in flower", and in Tamil, pūttal ("flowering") means menstruation. Menstruation itself is a form and a metaphor for a woman's special creativity. Thus a woman's biological and other kinds of creativity are symbolized by flowering. In this tale, the metaphor is literalized and extended. The protagonist literally becomes a tree, producing flowers without numbers over and over again, as the occasion requires. It is her special gift, which she doesn't wish to squander or even display.

=== Women's sexuality and vulnerability ===
Ramanujan also points out that the ritual relating to her flowering symbolizes sexual activity/ritual. It becomes a display of her spectacular talent which arouses her husband so that they can sleep together on the flowers from her body. In a way, people began to treat her as a thing, asking her "to make a spectacle of herself" by displaying her secret gift. Even the first time when she herself becomes a tree to sell her flowers she makes of herself a commodity.

The woman is most open to injury when she is most attractive when she is exercising her gift of flowering. Each time she becomes a tree, she begs the one who is pouring the water to be careful not to hurt her. Yet, paradoxically, when she is mutilated, she cannot be healed directly. She can be made whole only by becoming the tree again, becoming vulnerable again, and trusting her husband to graft and heal her broken branches. Symbolically speaking, the tree isolates and gives form to her capacity to put forth flowers and fragrance from within, a gift in which she could glory, as well as to the vulnerability that goes with it. It expresses a young woman's desire to flower sexually, and otherwise, as well as the dread of being ravaged that the very gift brings with it.

=== Woman's place in society ===
In women's tales like this one, the true antagonist as well as the helper for a woman is another woman, just as in the men's tales the hero battles always with an older male, a father figure, often with brothers. In this folk tale, she is helped by her mother (perhaps), sister, and elder sister-in-law but ravaged by her younger sister-in-law. This folk tale questions a basic need of any woman (or man) – security. She is safe with her own sister, maybe with her mother, but not quite with a newly wedded husband who cares more for a display of her talent than for her safety, and most certainly not with her teenage sister-in-law or her mother-in-law. She is safe only with a married sister-in-law (who is probably not threatened or envious) and, lastly, with a husband who, through an experience of loss, has matured enough to care for her as a person.

The story clearly points out the tortures faced by women in society because of their gender. She is supposed to be obedient to her husband and in-laws. It is pointed out that a woman is always under the control of someone in every phase of her life. During her childhood by her parents (here her mother) and her husband and in-laws after her marriage. She is made to do things without her approval. In this story, she transformed herself into a tree five times out of which only two times by her free will – the first and the last time.

The objectification of women is another strong issue hidden in this tale. After the younger daughter was ravaged by her sister-in-law she is reduced to a thing. Even before that, she is continuously demanded to transform into a tree just for pleasure – her emotions and wishes were of no regard whatsoever.

== See also ==
- The Dead Prince and the Talking Doll
