= Gulmohar (2009 film) =

- Theatrical release poster
- Directed by: Gajendra Ahire
- Produced by: Uttam Jhavar
- Starring: Sonali Kulkarni; Rajit Kapoor; Jeetendra Joshi; Mohan Agashe; Girija Oak; Sandesh Kulkarni
- Music by: Roop Kumar Rathod
- Release date: 27 February 2009
- Country: India
- Language: Marathi

Gulmohar (transl. Delonix regia) is a Marathi film released on 27 February 2009. The movie was produced by Uttam Jhavar and directed by Gajendra Ahire.

== Plot ==
Deven is an ambitious and competent young man who is married to Vidya. Vidya is an ideal wife, who handles her household duties as well as her career. The pace and anxiety of the city life with its gruelling routines affects their relationship. Deven's attitude to have everything his way puts his relationship though further strain. This affects Vidya as she is forced to choose between deciding to accept her fate or challenge societal norms and redefine her destiny.

== Cast ==
- Sonali Kulkarni as Vidya
- Rajit Kapur as Deven
- Jitendra Joshi as Dr.Bhagwan Satpute
- Mohan Agashe
- Girija Oak
- Sandesh Kulkarni

== Soundtrack ==
Roop Kumar Rathod directed the film's music.

Track	Song	Singer(s)	Duration
1	"Gardeetlya Dupaari Chahul Hi Nasawi"	Roop Kumar Rathod, Sunali Rathod	2:49
2	"Jarashi Mi Boltey Jarasha Tu Bola Re"	Roop Kumar Rathod, Sunali Rathod	3:37
3	"Sarti Din Rati"	Roop Kumar Rathod	2:30
