= Kachcha Limboo =

2018 Marathi film directed by Prasad Oak

- Theatrical release poster
- Directed by: Prasad Oak
- Written by: Chinmay Mandlekar
- Produced by: Mandar Devasthali, Sudhir Kolte, Mohan Naddar
- Starring: Sonali Kulkarni; Ravi Jadhav; Sachin Khedekar
- Cinematography: Amalendu Chaudhary
- Edited by: Jayant Jathar
- Music by: Rahul Ranade; Amar Oak
- Release date: 11 August 2017
- Running time: 110 minutes
- Country: India
- Language: Marathi

Kachcha Limboo (transl. Raw Lemon) is a 2017 Marathi language feature film directed by Prasad Oak and produced by Mandar Devasthali. The film was the recipient of the 2017 National Film Award in the Best Arts/Cultural Film category.

== Plot ==
Shaila (Sonali Kulkarni) and Mohan Katdare (Ravi Jadhav) live in Mumbai with their mentally challenged son Bachhu (Manmeet Pem). Shaila works from 9:00 am to 5:00 pm in an office, while Mohan works night shifts at a telegraph office and also types from home during the day to care for Bachhu. They hardly spend time together and lack intimacy. Shaila sees their situation as a sacrifice for Bachhu, but Mohan is frustrated. Things get more complicated when Bachhu, at 15, becomes addicted to sexual desires.

== Cast ==
- Ravi Jadhav as Mohan Katdare
- Sonali Kulkarni as Shaila Katdare
- Sachin Khedekar as Mr. Pandit
- Manmeet Pem as Bachchu Katdare
- Ananth Narayan Mahadevan as Venkat
- Uday Sabnis as Prasanna

== Awards ==
Year	Ceremony	Category	Result	Ref.
2018	65th National Film Awards	Best Feature Film in Marathi	Won	

== Reception ==
Nandani Ramnath of Scroll.in stated "The genteel poverty of a Mumbai chawl is superbly lensed by Amalendu Chaudhary in vivid black-and-white to heighten the family’s general state of impoverishment. Colour is used only for scenes and objects that depict a happier past – the hope-filled union between Mohan and Shaila, their joy at the birth of their son, the wedding sari and perfume that remind Shaila of her fading feminine side."

The Times of India gave it four stars out of five and wrote "Kaccha Limbu is easily one of the best films in Marathi cinema. Though shot in black and white, it has multiple layers that boast of fantastic writing and execution. Don’t miss this one."

Writing in Pune Mirror Ganesh Matkari states "Kaccha Limbu ends on a positive note, slightly different from the play, but this is the right approach. To an extent, reflects the change in societal attitudes towards mental disabilities, which has only recently taken place. At the same time, it uplifts the viewer and offers the right context for the dark film."
