= Daayraa =

- Directed by: Amol Palekar
- Written by: Timeri N. Murari
- Screenplay by: Timeri N. Murari
- Produced by: Dharampriya Das; Pravesh Sippy; Timeri N. Murari
- Starring: Nirmal Pandey; Sonali Kulkarni
- Cinematography: Debu Deodhar
- Edited by: Waman Bhonsle
- Music by: Anand–Milind
- Production companies: Gateway Entertainment; Saarth Productions
- Distributed by: Blue Dolphin Films (UK); Avanti Films (France)
- Release dates: 12 September 1996 (TIFF); 13 June 1997 (United Kingdom)
- Country: India
- Language: Hindi

Daayraa (transl. The Square Circle; sometimes spelled as Daayra) is a 1996 Indian Hindi-language film, directed by Amol Palekar, starring Nirmal Pandey and Sonali Kulkarni. The screenplay was by award-winning journalist and novelist, Timeri N. Murari. Exploring themes such as male-female relationships, preconceived notions of love, and social attitudes toward them, the plot involves a romantic relationship between a transvestite dancer and a gang raped woman who begins to dress up like a man. Due to its sensitive themes, the film was not released theatrically in India. The film was the first in Palekar's trilogy on sexuality; Anahat (2003) and Thaang (2006) followed it.

Daayraa was received well by critics upon its DVD release. Anupama Chopra wrote, "The film challenges gender roles and traditional ideas of love through witty and moving performances." She added, "Daayraa also has terrific music by Anand-Milind. However, you will have to get past some clumsy direction, terrible background music and glaring lapses in continuity."

The Time magazine called Daayraa one of the best films of 1996, saying: "The Indian musical at its delirious best. On the eve of her marriage, a young woman is abducted by a brothel madam and escapes into the arms of an out of work male Diva. He dresses as a woman, she as a man in Amol Palekar's song-and-dance comic melodrama."

== Synopsis ==
Set on the northeastern coast of India, this Indian film includes Bollywood song-and-dance elements in a plot about social issues in India, focusing on women's status in Indian village society, cross dressing, rape, and the history of Indian folk song. The film uses folk songs to tell the story, including one scene parodying Bollywood-style musical numbers.

== Cast ==
Character Name	Played by
The Transvestite	Nirmal Pandey
The Girl	Sonali Kulkarni
Madam	Faiyaz Shaikh
Bar Owner	Rekha Sahay
Widow	Neena Kulkarni
Garage Owner	Haidar Ali
Abductor	Nandu Madhav
Abductor	Nagesh Bhosle
Girl's Parent	Rekha Sabnis
Girl's Parent	Sanjay Sharma
Sushila's Husband	Kalyani Karandikar
Jeep Driver	Ganesh Yadav
Rapist	Shezaad
Rapist	Brijesh Singh
Rapist	Rajiv Mohanty

== Production ==
Timeri N. Murari, who wrote the story and screenplay for the film, said it is about "sexual identity", elaborating that it conveys "[h]ow we define ourselves as men or women and how that identity governs the way we live our lives." He further said, "This is the real India, not the version put out by Bollywood", while adding, "This is the India where women are casually molested and many men are male chauvinists". About how he conceptualized the story, Murari wrote, "I can't pin point exactly when an idea is born. I'd like to attribute this film to a pretty girl I saw years ago. She was a villager, herding goats along the roadside near Mysore, in South India. I was travelling with my wife and sister and got out of the car to take the girl's photograph. Her reaction was startling. She ran screaming and crying to her village and in a moment we were surrounded by her hostile people. We calmed them down and explained the camera, and in return told us why she was frightened. There had been a spate of kidnappings, all girls, who had disappeared forever. No doubt sold into prostitution."

== Soundtrack ==
Daayraa

Soundtrack album by Anand–Milind
- Genre: Feature film soundtrack
- Length: 30:32
- Label: Saregama

The duo of Anand–Milind scored the film's background music and composed its soundtrack. All songs are written by Gulzar. The soundtrack album consists of six tracks.

Track listing
No.	Title	Singer(s)	Length
1.	"Palkon Pe Chalte Chalte (Male Vocals)"	K. J. Yesudas	6:18
2.	"Bolo Kya Tum"	Asha Bhosle	6:05
3.	"Chhute Nahin Chhute Na"	K. J. Yesudas	6:37
4.	"Daayi Ankh Bole"	Devaki Pandit	5:15
5.	"Palkon Pe Chalte Chalte (Female Vocals)"	Asha Bhosle	6:17
Total length:			30:32

== Release and critical reception ==
The makers of Daayraa were asked "some allegedly obscene dialogue and phrases to be deleted" following which an "A" (Restricted to adults) certificate was given to the film by the Central Board of Film Certification in August 1996. However, it did not see theatrical release in India. It premiered at the 1996 Toronto International Film Festival and was then screened at the London Film Festival. Subsequent releases came in the film festivals of the Hamptons, Melbourne, Copenhagen, Oslo, New York and Vancouver. It was first released theatrically at Haymarket theatre in Leicester on 27 November 1999. Prints in the UK were distributed by Blue Dolphin Films, and in France by Avanti Films. Sequences of around 20 minutes involving soundtrack were trimmed in these releases. It completed an eight-week run in the West End of London.

The film met with praise from critics upon release. Richard Corliss of the Time magazine wrote, "The first 20 minutes of this Hindi- language panegyric packs sufficient incident for a dozen Hollywood movies" and credited the screenplay for the film. He concluded commending the film's "pulse and generosity". Writing for Time Out magazine, Trevor Johnston felt that it was the "film's thematic daring that's scintillating, though, as it explores the tension between sexual identity and social circumstance in a staunchly traditional society which offers little room for manoeuvre." He added, "While Kulkarni draws our sympathy, it's Pandey's caring, pragmatic, worldly-wise performance as the resourceful tranny that really draws you into the film's imaginative sphere. Forget your preconceptions about Hindi cinema; this takes us on a touching, witty, always surprising journey through terrain that's unfamiliar and human dilemmas that aren't. Quite an achievement, in any language."

The reviewer for the Observer felt the film could be "a blessing and a trap, and that relationships are often forged at the intersection of romance, duty and companionship." Derek Malcolm wrote that the film was "intriguing" and that "Murari's script is allowed to take wing..." in the Guardian. Writing for the Financial Times, Nigel Andrews said that the "film puts the melos back into melodrama and the sense (and sensitivity) into sensationalism." The reviewer for Asian Entertainment called the film "moving and meditative" while adding that it "plays quiet testimony to the talents of filmmakers on the fringes of commercial cinema." The Independent commended Pandey for his portrayal of a transvestite in that "it takes an actor of considerable talent to elicit sympathy". The Gay Times wrote that the "truth" that the makers were trying to convey were "handled with dignity and conviction".

== Awards ==
Festival de Valenciennes, France

- Grand Prix award
- Best Actor — Sonali Kulkarni
- Best Actress — Nirmal Pandey

44th National Film Awards

- Special Jury Award (feature film)

== See also ==
- Alternative lifestyle
