= Taxi No. 9211 =

2006 Indian film by Milan Luthria

Taxi No. 9 2 11: Nau Do Gyarah
- Theatrical release poster
- Directed by: Milan Luthria
- Screenplay by: Rajat Arora
- Story by: Rajat Arora
- Based on: Changing Lanes by Roger Michell
- Produced by: Ramesh Sippy; Rohan Sippy
- Starring: Nana Patekar; John Abraham; Sameera Reddy; Sonali Kulkarni; Shivaji Satam
- Narrated by: Sanjay Dutt
- Cinematography: Kartik Vijay
- Edited by: Aarif Shaikh
- Music by: Vishal–Shekhar
- Production companies: Entertainment One; Ramesh Sippy Entertainment
- Distributed by: UTV Motion Pictures
- Release date: 24 February 2006; (India)
- Running time: 116 minutes
- Country: India
- Language: Hindi
- Budget: ₹100 million
- Box office: ₹321.7 million

Taxi No. 9 2 11: Nau Do Gyarah is a 2006 Indian Hindi-language comedy thriller film directed by Milan Luthria and produced by Ramesh Sippy. The film stars Nana Patekar, John Abraham, and Sameera Reddy. The film was released on 24 February 2006, and received positive reviews from critics, becoming a moderate success at the box-office. The film's basic premise is loosely based on the 2002 American film Changing Lanes. In the same year it was remade in Telugu as Game, and in 2009, it was remade in Tamil as TN-07 AL 4777.

== Plot ==
Taxi No. 9 2 11 focuses on Raghav Shastri (Nana Patekar), a cab driver in Mumbai who lies to his wife Sunita (Sonali Kulkarni) about his job, pretending to be an insurance salesman. One day, he gives Jai Mittal (John Abraham), the spoilt son of a late businessman, a ride. Jai is fighting for ownership rights of his late father's estate. The cab gets into an accident, with Jai escaping as he's in a hurry. Jai loses the key to the vault containing his father's will in the back of Raghav's taxi.

Raghav decides to hide it from Jai. In the search for the key, Jai goes to Raghav's house and tells Sunita what he really does for a living, which Jai doesn't know. She leaves him, taking their son. Raghav decides to take revenge. Raghav and Jai vow to kill each other in their fight for their properties. When Raghav fails to kill Jai, he targets Jai's girlfriend, Rupali (Sameera Reddy). As Raghav chases Rupali, she is saved by Jai. Jai lets Rupali escape, and he attacks Raghav. They have a dirty car fight, but both survive.

Raghav goes to Jai's place. Jai returns to his apartment from a second court hearing regarding his father's estate in defeat because he doesn't have his father's will. He discovers the will, torn to pieces and pasted on the wall of his apartment. Jai becomes depressed and lonely after his friends leave him. Rupali dumps him, indicating she wanted him only for his fortune. Losing everything that used to be precious, Jai realises the hard-hitting life and starts respecting his father and his work.

On the other side, Raghav is caught again by police and taken to the police station, where Sunita tells him his real character and problems within himself. Soon, he realises his mistake. Jai, having realised the value of close ones, then bails Raghav out of jail. Raghav insists they have a drink, and they go to Jai's house for one. They find out that they share the same birthday. Raghav gives back his will, which he had hidden in the sofa, and says that he had never destroyed it – the torn will on the wall is a fake. Raghav then goes to the railway station to stop Sunita and his son from leaving him, but arrives a little too late. He goes back home, where he sees a birthday cake on the table. He feels that he is hallucinating, but gets a pleasant shock when he sees Sunita and his son standing there, singing him a birthday song (and finds out that it was Jai who brought them back).

Jai meets Arjun Bajaj (Shivaji Satam), the friend and custodian of the property of Jai's father, whom he tells that he has realised the value of life and does not want his father's property. Bajaj, visibly happy to hear this, tells Jai that the inheritance has always been Jai's and Bajaj is only a custodian. They embrace, and Jai takes a leave. Just as he drives out, his car collides with another car driven by a woman (Priyanka Chopra), though initially both seem to be angry at each. Later, Jai apologizes and asks for her number, promising to pay for damages. The movie ends as both smile at each other and drive away, indicating a new romantic beginning.

== Cast ==
- Nana Patekar as Raghav Shastri aka Raghu
- John Abraham as Jai Mittal
- Sameera Reddy as Rupali
- Sonali Kulkarni as Sunita Shastri, Raghav's wife
- Kurush Deboo as Cyrus Batliwala
- Shivaji Satam as Arjun Bajaj
- Sanjay Dutt as Narrator
- Priyanka Chopra as Driver special appearance
- Akash Khurana as Shyam Mittal, Jai Mittal's father
- Naseer Abdullah as Advocate Shivraj Behl (Shiv)
- Smita Jaykar as Rupali's mother
- Rajesh Asthana as Car owner
- Ganesh Yadav as an Inspector
- Mangal Kenkre as Judge
- Ajay Jadhav as a Constable
- Master Ashwin Chitale as Rishabh Shastri, Raghav's son
- Shankar Sachdev as Tiwari
- Anuradha Chandan as School Principal
- Bharat as Jeweller
- Vaibhav Mathur as Paanwala
- Rajeev Pandey as Flat complex watchman
- Mohammad as Lottery guy

== Themes and influences ==
Director Milan Luthria, when asked to define the film's genre, described it as a dialogue-based witty comedy with elements of romance, and an emotional thriller that makes one think. He felt it compels viewers to delve into themselves, seeking the meaning of life and answers to their own questions, while also portraying the essence of Mumbai and its hustle. Calling it a "very funny, clever film", he left the genre classification to the critics. The Times of India defined the film as a slice-of-life drama.

Film critic Rajeev Masand noted in his review that while the film "stole" the basic premise from the 2002 American film Changing Lanes, the spirit, treatment and the screenplay were original.

According to Rediff.com, the film's title gives the impression of September 11 Attacks when read in English, hence has to be read out in Hindi as nau-do-gyarah, which is a slang for conning people and disappearing into thin air.

== Soundtrack ==
Taxi No. 9 2 11

Soundtrack album by Vishal–Shekhar
- Released: 10 November 2005 (Digital Release); 24 February 2006 (Film)
- Genre: Film soundtrack
- Length: 33:04
- Label: Saregama
- Producer: Vishal–Shekhar

Vishal–Shekhar chronology
Zinda (2006)	Taxi No. 9 2 11 (2006)	Om Shanti Om (2007)

Soundtrack
Review scores
Source	Rating
Music Review at IndiaFM.com	not rated

The music was composed by Vishal–Shekhar with lyrics by Vishal Dadlani and Dev Kohli. The movie has six songs with two remixes. It features a song sung by yesteryear music composer Bappi Lahiri. The soundtrack was released sometime in the third week of January 2006 under the label of Saregama.

=== Track listing ===
No.	Title	Lyrics	Singer(s)	Length
1.	"Bumbai Nagariya"		Bappi Lahiri, Nana Patekar, John Abraham	3:19
2.	"Ek Nazar Mein Bhi"		KK, Sunidhi Chauhan	4:37
3.	"Meter Down"		Adnan Sami	3:12
4.	"Aazmale"	Dev Kohli	Shekhar Ravjiani	4:54
5.	"Bekhudi"	Dev Kohli	Shaan	4:33
6.	"Udne Do"	lyrics by Dev Kohli	Kunal Ganjawala, Harshdeep Kaur	6:15
7.	"Bumbai Nagariya" (Club Mix)		Bappi Lahiri, Remix By Guru Sharma	3:13

== Box office ==
Taxi No. 9 2 11 was one of the highest-grossing films of 2006.
