= Gharabaher =

Gharabaher - Marathi Movie
- Theatrical release poster
- Directed by: Sanjay Surkar
- Written by: Vijay Kuwalekar
- Produced by: Ratan Madaan
- Starring: Mohan Joshi; Sonali Kulkarni; Sachin Khedekar; Smita Talwalkar; Prashant Damle
- Cinematography: Harish Joshi
- Edited by: Vishwas Anil
- Music by: Shridhar Phadke
- Production company: Suyog Chitra
- Release date: 27 October 1999
- Running time: 126 Minutes
- Country: India
- Language: Marathi

Gharabaher (transl. Outdoors) is an Indian Marathi-language political drama film released on 27 October 1999. The movie was produced by Ratan Madaan and directed by Sanjay Surkar.

== Plot ==
In a time when the government decides to boost women's role in politics by setting quotas, there's Annasaheb, an experienced MLA for thirty years. He looks to his bright daughter, Vasudha, and urges her to step into his shoes, thinking it will ensure that things remain unchanged for their family. However, as Vasudha gets deeper into the role, she realizes it's more of a puppet position, with her father pulling the strings.

While Vasudha's brother starts causing more trouble, the family chooses to ignore it. Things take a dark turn when Vasudha's college friend, Sameer Shinde, speaks out against the family. This doesn't sit well with them, leading to Sameer's tragic murder.

This heartbreaking event becomes the turning point for Vasudha. Faced with injustice and family ties that seem to have lost their essence, she makes a firm decision. Despite the emotional turmoil, she vows to uncover Sameer's killer and bring them to justice, even if it means cutting off connections with her own family.

== Cast ==
- Sonali Kulkarni as Vasudha
- Mohan Joshi as Annasaheb
- Sachin Khedekar as Vasudha's brother
- Smita Talwalkar as Smita
- Prashant Damle as Sameer Shinde

== Awards and accolades ==
This movie won two National Awards (for Best Feature Film and Best Director) and eight Maharashtra State Awards (Best Feature Film, Best Director, Best Actor, Best Supporting Actor, Best Art Direction, Best Costumes, Best Make-up and Best Screenplay).
