= Gulabjaam =

- Film poster
- Directed by: Sachin Kundalkar
- Written by: Sachin Kundalkar; Tejas Modak
- Produced by: Vinod Malgewar; Vishal Chordia
- Starring: Siddharth Chandekar; Sonali Kulkarni; Madhura Deshpande; Chinmay Udgirkar
- Cinematography: Milind Jog
- Edited by: Suchitra Sathe
- Music by: Debarpito Saha; Thaikkudam Bridge
- Production companies: Zee Studios; A Golden Gate Motion Pictures
- Distributed by: Zee Studios
- Release date: 16 February 2018
- Running time: 120 minutes
- Country: India
- Language: Marathi
- Box office: ₹5.25 crore

Gulabjaam is a 2018 Indian Marathi-language comedy drama film directed by Sachin Kundalkar and starring Siddharth Chandekar and Sonali Kulkarni in lead roles and Madhura Deshpande and Chinmay Udgirkar in supporting roles.

== Plot ==
The film revolves around an NRI, Aditya Naik (Siddharth Chandekar), who dreams of opening a Maharashtrian gourment restaurant in London to spread its magic across borders. To fulfill his dream, he resigns from his job of a banker and comes to Pune to learn the traditional cooking styles. Aditya finds inspiration in an eccentric woman, Radha Agarkar (Sonali Kulkarni), who runs a small-time tiffin business, and wishes to learn from her.

== Cast ==
- Siddharth Chandekar as Aditya Naik
- Sonali Kulkarni as Radha Agarkar
- Madhura Deshpande as Neha (Aditya's fiancée)
- Chinmay Udgirkar as Amey (Radha's old friend)
- Mahesh Ghag as Popat (Radha's tiffin delivery person)
- Mohanabai as Rukmini Mavshi (Radha's housemaid)
- Priya Bapat as London Hotel Customer (cameo)
- Renuka Shahane as Vidya (Radha's Sister) (cameo)
