= Pension (film) =

2021 Marathi film

- Promotional film poster
- Directed by: Pundalilik Yoshada Laxman Dhumal
- Story by: Pundalilik Yoshada Laxman Dhumal
- Produced by: Savi Goel
- Starring: Sonali Kulkarni; Nilambari Khamkar; Sumit Gutte
- Cinematography: Raja Phadtare
- Music by: Arvind Sagole
- Release date: 27 February 2021
- Country: India
- Language: Marathi

The 2021 Indian Marathi-language film Pension, directed by Pundalilik Yoshada Laxman Dhumal and produced by Savi Goel, stars Sonali Kulkarni, Nilambari Khamkar, and Sumit Gutte. Sonali Kulkarni's performance garnered widespread critical acclaim, earning her the Filmfare Critics Award for Best Actress – Marathi and a nomination for Best Actress at the Maharashtra State Film Awards.

== Reception ==
The Times of India reviewed the film, stating, "Director Pundalik YL Dhumal's film is based on a soul-stirring premise with its heart in the right place. However, the final product lacks finesse. Too much time is spent exploring daily life in the village, petty quarrels, and peculiar people, rather than focusing on the crux of the matter, which hampers the flow and fails to hold the viewer's attention for long."

Maharashtra Times praised the performances, noting: "Sonali Kulkarni delivers a strong performance as Vimal, also lending her voice to folk songs, including 'Surya Ugavala Gagani, Jeev Mazha Chakrapani' for the film's credits. Nilambari Khamkar excels in her role, while Sumit Gutte, a newcomer playing Baloo, performs convincingly. Amidst the glamour, Ashay stands out. This is why Eros Now picked up the film. Though the story is concise, its impact is profound, making it a work of art for a sensitive audience, best appreciated with heartfelt engagement."

Loksatta commented on the film, stating: "The film captures the struggle for a pension with a poignant narrative, but its execution falters at times, making it a mixed experience."

== Cast ==
- Sonali Kulkarni as Vimal
- Sumit Gutte as Balu
- Nilambari Khamkar as Grandmother
- Vrunda Baal
- Narayan Jadhav

== Soundtrack ==
Track listing
No.	Title	Singer(s)	Length
1.	"Surya Ugavla Gagani"	Sonali Kulkarni	1.53
Total length:			1.53
