= List of Marathi films of 2009 =

A list of films produced by the Marathi language film industry based in Maharashtra in the year 2009.

== January–March ==
Opening		Title	Director	Cast	Producer	Notes	Genre	Source
J A N	2	Ek Daav Dhobhipachhad	Satish Rajwade	Ashok Saraf, Mukta Barve, Subodh Bhave, Pushkar Shrotri, Prasad Oak	Ashok Saraf		Comedy	
J A N	8	Zenda	Avadhoot Gupte	Siddharth Chandekar, Chinmay Mandlekar, Santosh Juvekar	Everest Entertainment		Political Drama	
F E B	24	Varat Aali Gharat	Vijay Gokhale	Alka Kubal, Vijay Gokhale, Bharat Jadhav	Everest Entertainment		Comedy, Drama	
F E B	27	Gulmohar	Gajendra Ahire	Mohan Agashe, Jeetendra Joshi, Rajit Kapoor	Everest Entertainment		Drama	

== April–June ==
Opening		Title	Director	Cast	Producer	Notes	Genre	Source
A P R	3	Mi Shivajiraje Bhosale Boltoy	Santosh Manjrekhar	Sachin Khedekar, Makarand Anaspure, Mahesh Manjrekar, Priya Bapat	Everest Entertainment		Fantasy, Drama, Comedy	
A P R	14	Goshta Choti Dongraevadhi	Nagesh Bhonsle	Makarand Anaspure, Nagesh Bhonsle, Sayaji Shinde, Madhavi Juvekar			Drama	
A P R	17	Bokya Satbande	Raj Pendurkar	Aryan Narvekar, Dilip Prabhavalkar	Nishad Audio Visuals		Family, Comedy	
M A Y	1	Tu Maza Jeev	Ranjan Singh	Shalmali Kholgade, Rutwig Vaidya				
M A Y	24	Nishani Dava Angatha	Purshottam Berde	Makarand Anaspure, Ashok Saraf, Nirmiti Sawant	Ashtavinayak Chitra		Drama, Comedy	
J U N	19	Hello! Gandhe Sir	Sameer Naik, Sandeep Deshpande	Bharat Jadhav, Girish Oak	Everest Entertainment		Drama	

== July–September ==
Opening		Title	Director	Cast	Producer	Notes	Genre	Source
J U L	10	Gabhricha Paus	Satish Manwar	Girish Kulkarni, Sonali Kulkarni, Jyoti Subhash	Everest Entertainment		Comedy, Drama	
A U G	7	Agnidivya	Ajit Shirole	Mohan Agashe, Subodh Bhave, Mohan Joshi	Paras Movies, Suryaputra		Drama	
A U G	7	Gandha	Sachin Kundalkar	Girish Kulkarni, Amruta Subhash, Neena Kulkarni	Flashbulbs Ventures		Drama	
S E P	4	Rita	Renuka Shahane	Pallavi Joshi, Jackie Shroff, Renuka Shahane	Walkwater Media		Drama	
S E P	4	Samaantar	Amol Palekar	Radhika Apte, Makrand Deshpande, Amol Palekar, Sharmila Tagore	Reliance Big Pictures		Drama	
S E P	4	Anolkhi Hey Ghar Maze	Sachin Deo	Ashok Saraf, Tushar Dalvi, Kavita Lad	Akshar Films, Nomad Films		Family	
S E P	25	Jogwa	Rajiv Patil	Upendra Limaye, Mukta Barve, Vinay Apte	iDream Productions		Drama	

== October–December ==
Opening		Title	Director	Cast	Producer	Notes	Genre	Source
O C T	9	Vihir	Umesh Vinayak Kulkarni	Madan Deodhar, Alok Rajwade, Mohan Agashe				
N O V	6	Gaiir	Satish Rajwade	Ankush Choudhary, Sandeep Kulkarni, Tejaswini Pandit, Amruta Khanvilkar			Mystery	
D E C	4	Ek Cup Chya	Sumitra Bhave, Sunil Sukthankar	Om Bhutkar, Devika Daftardar, Madan Deodhar	Everest Entertainment		Drama	
