= Amruta Subhash =

Indian actress (born 1979)

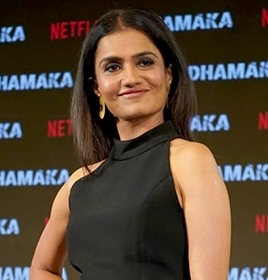
- Subhash in 2021
- Born: Amruta Dhembre; 13 May 1979 (age 47); Mumbai, Maharashtra, India
- Occupation: Actress
- Years active: 1997–present
- Spouse: Sandesh Kulkarni (m. 2003)
- Mother: Jyoti Subhash
- Family: Deshpande–Subhash–Kulkarni family

Amruta Subhash is an Indian actress who works in Marathi and Hindi films, television, and theatre. She is a graduate of the National School of Drama, New Delhi. She has received several awards, including a National Film Award, a Filmfare Award, two Filmfare Awards Marathi and two Filmfare OTT Awards.

== Career ==
Subhash made her debut with the National Award-winning film and India's Oscar entry for the year 2004, Shwaas.

She won the National Film Award for Best Supporting Actress in 2013, for her role in the Marathi film Astu and has starred in numerous critically acclaimed films that have won various awards around the world, such as the Crystal Bear at the Berlin International Film Festival and the Fedeora Award at the Venice Film Festival.

Subhash is also a classically trained singer who has lent her voice to various Marathi films.

As a playback singer, she has won accolades such as the Maharashtra Government State Award for the film Nital. She has appeared in the Netflix Original series Selection Day (2018–19) and opposite Nawazuddin Siddiqui in Sacred Games (2019).

Subhash was a student at S P College, Pune. She started her acting career in theatre. She graduated from the National School of Drama, New Delhi, where she studied under Satyadev Dubey. While there, she appeared in various plays, including Urvashiam (1997), Bela Meri Jaan (1998), House of Bernada, Alba (1998), and Mrug Trushna (1999). Returning to Maharashtra, she appeared in various Marathi plays, including Tee Fulrani. This role, previously portrayed by Bhakti Barve, brought her into the spotlight. Adapted along the lines of My Fair Lady, which in turn is based on George Bernard Shaw's famous play Pygmalion, the play was written by Pu La Deshpande. Later, Subhash featured in many Marathi films and television series, playing supporting roles, and then moved into lead roles. She is also a trained Bharatanatyam dancer.

Subhash portrayed the role of ex-bar dancer Lily in the Netflix series Bombay Begums, directed by Alankrita Shrivastava.

=== Film and television ===
Subhash made her film debut in the 2004 film Shwaas, which won Best Feature Film at the 51st National Film Awards. The film was also the official entry from India to the 77th Academy Awards in the category of Best Foreign Language Film; it did not reach the nomination list, however. Subhash went on to act in a number of Hindi-language films. Her next project was Chausar. Directed by Sagar Sarhadi, whose 1982 film Bazaar was critically acclaimed, Subhash called the role a "dream come true". The same year, she played the title role in the television film Nirmala, directed by Gulzar, based on Premchand's novel of the same name. Aired on Doordarshan in October 2004, the film was the last episode in Gulzar's series Tehreer.... Munshi Premchand Ki, adapted from Premchand's stories. She also acted in the series Ek Prem Katha, directed by Basu Chatterjee.

Subhash was next seen playing various roles in TV shows, such as Zoka, Paaulkhuna, and most importantly, Awaghachi Sansaar, which aired on Zee Marathi. She became popular for her role of Aasawari opposite actor Prasad Oak, where she fights back against the atrocities inflicted upon her by her husband.

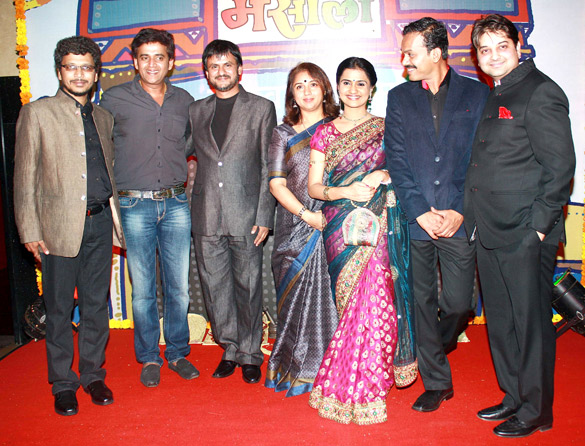
Revathi and Amruta Subhash at the screening of Masala at PVR Phoenix, 2012

Her 2005 film White Rainbow was based on the stories of the widows of Vrindavan, where she played a 15-year-old widow who is forced into prostitution. In 2008, she appeared in a supporting role in Nandita Das's debut directorial venture Firaaq, based on the aftermath of the 2002 communal riots in Gujarat. Critically acclaimed, nationally as well as at various international festivals, the film showcased several notable actors including Naseeruddin Shah, Paresh Rawal, and Deepti Naval. The same year, the Marathi-language comedy Valu was released. Directed by Umesh Vinayak Kulkarni, the film included Atul Kulkarni, Mohan Agashe, Bharati Achrekar, Girish Kulkarni, Dilip Prabhavalkar, among others. The film also featured Subhash's mother, Jyoti Subhash.

Her 2009 film Tya Ratri Paus Hota cast her as a drug-addicted teenager. The same year, she appeared in Sachin Kundalkar's film Gandha. Subhash's mother played her fictional mother in the production. The film was later adapted into Hindi by Kundalkar as Aiyyaa in 2012.

=== Theater ===
"Whether I am tired, sad or depressed... my plays never fail to uplift my mood and always make me feel rejuvenated at the end of it."
— Subhash on her love for theater.

Along with her film career, Subhash has acted in a number of theatre plays, including Sathecha Kaay Karayacha! and Shree Tashi Sau. In Sathecha Kaay Karayacha!, directed by her husband Sandesh Kulkarni, Subhas played the role of Salma, an understanding wife who tries to solve the problems of her husband who falls prey to self-torturing jealousy. In Ajuni Yeto Vaas Fhulana, director Chetan Datar paid tribute to veteran theatre personality Satyadev Dubey. While Dubey was played by Nandu Madhav, Subhas played the role of an experienced student of Dubey. She also appeared in the play Chhotyashya Suteet, which was written by Sachin Kundalkar. In 2008, she acted in the play Love Birds, directed by Girish Joshi. The suspense thriller play was well appreciated by the audience for its innovative way of mixing in video clips. She played the role of a wife whose husband (played by Aniket Vishwasrao) has lost his memory and is learning bitter truths about her as he recovers. In 2020, she acted in a Hindi-language play titled Phir Se Honeymoon, written and directed by her husband, Sandesh Kulkarni, about a couple that decides to go on a second honeymoon in an effort to revive their relationship. However, the play had to be put on hold due to the COVID-19 pandemic. In 2022, the play was revived in Marathi and retitled Punashcha Honeymoon.

=== Singing ===
Subhash studied classical singing for three years. Her debut album, Jata Jata Pawasane, was not successful commercially. She has featured as a playback singer in films like Haapus (2010) and Ajintha (2012) and has provided background music to the films Nital (2006) and Teen Bahene. In 2012, she participated in the Marathi singing competition Sa Re Ga Ma Pa, organised for celebrities. She went to the top 5 and competed in the finale along with Ajay Purkar, Ketki Thatte, Vaibhav Mangle, and Prashant Damle, with Damle winning the competition.

== Personal life ==
Subhash's birth name is Amruta Subhashchandra Dhembre. She is the daughter of actress Jyoti Subhash, and she has said her interest in acting was inspired by her mother. They have acted together in many films, including Aaji, Zoka, Gandha, Masala, Nital, Valu, Badha, Vihir, and Gully Boy, and the play Kalokhachya Leki. Jyoti Subhash played the role of Amruta's grandmother in Aaji and that of her mother in Gandha. Subhash is married to director Sandesh Kulkarni, who has directed her in plays such as Sathecha Kaay Karayacha! and Pahila Vahila. The actress supports various social causes. She is a brand ambassador for Zee Marathi Jagruti, an initiative by Zee Marathi Channel Group, for the empowerment of Marathi women. Her sister-in-law is actress Sonali Kulkarni.

== Selected filmography ==
=== Film ===
List of film appearances, with year, title, and role shown
Year	Title	Role	Language	Notes
2004	Dev	Qureshi	Hindi	
2004	Shwaas	Aasawari	Marathi	
2004	White Rainbow	Deepti	Hindi	
2004	Devrai	Parvati	Marathi	
2008	Valu	Sangi	Marathi	
2008	Contract	Goonga's wife	Hindi	
2008	Firaaq	Jyoti	Hindi	
2009	Gandha	Veena	Marathi	"Lagnaachya Vayachi Mulgi" segment
2009	Vihir	Prabha	Marathi	
2010	Haapus		Marathi	As playback singer
2012	Masala	Sarika	Marathi	
2012	Ajintha		Marathi	As playback singer
2013	Balak-Palak	Dolly	Marathi	
2013	Astu – So Be It	Channama	Marathi	
2014	Killa	Aruna Kale	Marathi	
2015	Island City	Sarita Joshi	Hindi	
2016	Chidiya	Vaishnavi	Hindi	
2016	Raman Raghav 2.0	Lakshmi	Hindi	
2017	Ti Ani Itar	Janaki	Marathi	
2019	Gully Boy	Razia Sheikh	Hindi	
2019	Dithee	Parubai	Marathi	
2020	Ghost Stories	Nurse	Hindi	Zoya Akhtar's segment
2020	Choked: Paisa Bolta Hai	Sharvari Tai	Hindi	
2021	Dhamaka	Ankita Malaskar	Hindi	
2022	Wonder Women	Jaya	English	
2023	Lust Stories 2	Seema	Hindi	
2023	Shastry Viruddh Shastry	Shalini Patwardhan	Hindi	
2025	Jarann	Radha	Marathi	
2025	Parinati	Dr. Saili	Marathi	

=== Television ===
List of television appearances, with year, title, and role shown
Year	Title	Role	Language	Notes
2006–2010	Avaghachi Sansar	Asawari Bhosale	Marathi	
2012	Sa Re Ga Ma Pa Marathi	Contestant	Marathi	
2018	Selection Day	Meera	Hindi	Netflix series
2019	Sacred Games Season 2	Kusum Devi Yadav	Hindi	Netflix series
2021	Bombay Begums	Lily / Laxmi	Hindi	Netflix series
2022	Saas Bahu Achaar Pvt. Ltd.	Suman Shrivastava	Hindi	
2022	Bus Bai Bas	Guest	Marathi	

== Awards and nominations ==
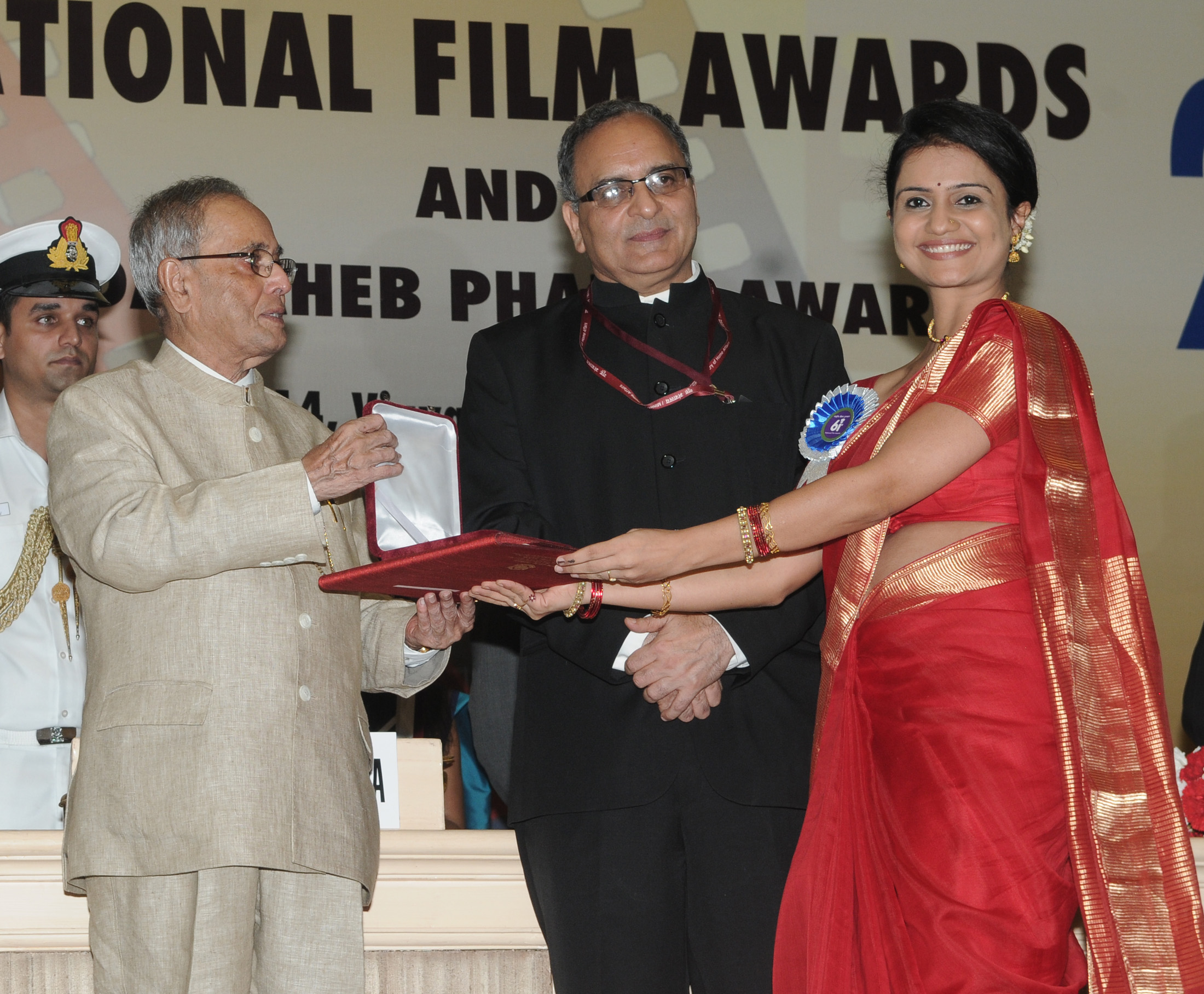
Pranab Mukherjee presenting the Rajat Kamal Award for Best Supporting Actress to Amruta Subhash at the 61st National Film Awards

In 2006, Subhash was awarded the Best Actress award for her role in the TV show Avaghachi Sansar, presented by Zee Marathi Awards. She has also received the V. Shantaram Award for her role in the film Savalee. In 2014, she got the National Film Award for Best Supporting Actress for her film Astu, directed by Sumitra Bhave–Sunil Sukthankar (shared with Aida El-Kashef), She also won the Filmfare Award Marathi for Best Supporting Actress for the film Astu. and the Crystal Bear for Best Film, awarded by the children's jury in the Generation Kplus section at the 64th Berlin International Film Festival, for the movie Killa.

Year	Award	Category	Work	Result	Ref.
2014	National Film Awards	Best Supporting Actress	Astu (tied with Aida El-Kashef for Ship of Theseus)	Won	
2014	Filmfare Awards Marathi	Best Supporting Actress	Astu	Won	
2020	Filmfare Awards	Best Supporting Actress	Gully Boy	Won	
2021	Asian Academy Creative Awards	Best Actress in a Supporting Role	Bombay Begums	Won	
2021	Filmfare OTT Awards	Best Supporting Actor (Female)	Bombay Begums	Won	
2022	Filmfare OTT Awards	Best Actor Drama Series (Female)	Saas Bahu Achaar Pvt. Ltd.	Nominated	
2022	Filmfare OTT Awards	Best Supporting Actor in a Web Original Film (Female)	Dhamaka	Nominated	
2023	Filmfare OTT Awards	Best Supporting Actor in a Web Original Film (Female)	Lust Stories 2	Won	
