= Cobalt Blue =

Cobalt blue is a type of color pigment.

Cobalt blue may also refer to:

== Animals ==
- Cobalt blue tarantula, a type of tarantula
- Cobalt Blue Mbuna or Cobalt Blue African Cichlid, a type of fish
- Cobalt Blue (horse), winner of the 2007 San Felipe Stakes

== Fiction ==
- Cobalt Blue (comics), a comic book character appearing in books published by DC Comics
- Cobalt Blue (novel), a 2013 Indian novel by Sachin Kundalkar
- Cobalt Blue (film), a 2022 Netflix adaptation of the Kundalkar novel
- Cobalt Blue (novel), a 2022 Australian novel by Matthew Reilly

== Other uses ==
- Cobalt blue (RAL), a RAL color
- Cobalt Blue (album), 1992 album of ambient electric guitar music by Michael Brook
- Cobalt blue glass, a type of glass
