= Jyoti Subhash =

Indian actress

- Occupation: Actress
- Children: Amruta Subhash
- Family: Deshpande–Subhash–Kulkarni family

Jyoti Subhash is an Indian actress who works in Marathi film, television and theatre industry. She is best known for her works in Marathi films like Valu (2008), Gabhricha Paus (2009) and Bollywood films like Phoonk (2008) and Aiyyaa (2012).

== Career ==
Jyoti Subhash started her career through theatre and then moving to television and films. She was recognised in her early works of television. Aired on Doordarshan, she featured in the telefilms Rukmavati Ki Haveli (1991) and Zazeere (1992). Directed by Govind Nihalani, the 1991 show Rukmavati Ki Haveli was based on the Spanish play The House of Bernarda Alba, which was written by Federico García Lorca. A story of a new-widow, Rukmavati, raising her five unwed daughters in her haveli in Rajasthan, was shot on 16 mm film and was later blown up to 35 mm. In 2009, the film was shown in a special session by National Centre for the Performing Arts (NCPA), Mumbai. In 1999, she translated the Marathi play Raste, originally written by Govind Purushottam Deshpande into Hindi as Raaste. The Hindi play was directed by Arvind Gaur and Satyadev Dubey. She played various supporting roles of elder women in the family in films like Dahavi Fha, Devrai, Aamhi Asu Ladke, Shubhra Kahi and more.

In 2004, she acted in an Urdu play Jis Lahore Naee Dekhya, a story based in the partition era of India. Subhash played an aged Hindu woman left behind in Lahore while her family migrates to India. Her haveli is then occupied by a Muslim family who at first are hostile to her, but later on accept her into their family.

In 2006, she acted in the Marathi movie Nital, directed by Sumitra Bhave and Sunil Sukhthankar. Neena Kulkarni was a co-actress. The lead character was played by Devika Daftardar. The film was produced by Dr. Maya Tulpule, owner and founder of Sahawas Hospital and president of Shweta Association, a Vitiligo self help support group. The film showcased the story of a girl having vitiligo and social stigma around it.

"Umesh and I complement each other but if you ask about our lucky mascot then it has to be Jyoti Subhash. It is essential for both of us that Jyotiji be a part of our film."
— Actor Girish Kulkarni, who has costarred with Subhash in many films.

Directed by Umesh Vinayak Kulkarni, Valu (2008) was a comedy film where she played the character Sakhubai. The film also starred Girish Kulkarni in a major role, along with other actors like Atul Kulkarni, Mohan Agashe, Dilip Prabhavalkar, Nirmiti Sawant and more. The script was written by Umesh and Girish Kulkarni. They together made their next film, Vihir, in 2010 where again Subhash was cast. She played a grandmother to two school going boys who come to their village in their holidays. Next year in 2011 the Kulkarni duo came up with the satirical film Deool. She has also played Kulkarni's mother in Gabhricha Paus. In 2009, she played a mother worried about her daughter's marriage in the film Gandha. Directed by Sachin Kundalkar, the film had three different stories and Subhash played her real-life daughter, Amruta Subhash's mother. In 2012, the film was made in Hindi by Kundalkar as Aiyyaa, where she played the lead actresses's grandmother; a role which was not present in the original Marathi version.

In Masala (2012), she plays the supporting role of a wife of a businessman (played by Mohan Agashe). Recently in 2013, she was part of the Marathi play Uney Purey Shahar Ek (or Boiled Beans on a Toast), originally written by Girish Karnad in Kannada as Benda Kaalu on Toast. Being story of a city, rather than of people, the play had cast of Radhika Apte, Vibhavari Deshpande, Anita Date, Ashwini Giri and more.

== Personal life ==
Her original name is Jyoti Subhashchandra Dhembre after marriage. Jyoti Subhash is mother of actress Amruta Subhash. They have acted together in many films (Aaji, Zoka, Gandha, Masala, Nital, Valu, Badha, Gully Boy, Vihir) and a play (Kalokhachya Leki). She says that being together in any creative process makes the bond stronger. She played Amruta's grandmother in Aaji and that of her mother in 2009 film Gandha. She also helped her while playing a 60-year-old woman in her film Kavadase. Her son-in-law Sandesh Kulkarni is a film director.

== Selected filmography ==
- Note: Unless otherwise noted, below works are in Marathi language.

| Year | Title | Role | Medium | Notes |
|---|---|---|---|---|
| 1991 | Rukmavati Ki Haveli | | TV film | Hindi language |
| 1992 | Jazeere | Chuha Mausi | TV film | Hindi language |
| 1997 | Nazarana | | TV film | Hindi language |
| 1999 | Raaste | – | Play | Writer of Hindi version |
| 2002 | Dahavi Fa | | Marathi film | |
| | Adhantar | | Play | |
| | Ek Shunya Bajirao | | Play | |
| 2004 | Devrai | | Film | |
| 2004 | Shubhra Kahi | Aai | Film | |
| 2004 | Jis Lahore Naee Dekhya | Maaee | Play | Urdu language |
| 2005 | Aamhi Asu Ladke | | Film | |
| 2005 | Pak Pak Pakaak | grandmother of Chikloo | Film | |
| 2006 | Nital | Vasudha | Film | |
| 2006 | Badha | | Film | |
| 2008 | Valu | Sakhubai | Film | |
| 2008 | Mahasatta | | Film | |
| 2008 | Phoonk | Amma | Film | Hindi language |
| 2009 | Bokya Satbande | | Film | |
| 2009 | Gabhricha Paus | | Film | |
| 2009 | Gandha | Veena's mother | Film | |
| 2009 | Swatantryachi Aishi Taishi | | Film | |
| 2009 | Ekam | – | Play | Director of the play |
| 2010 | Vihir | | Film | |
| 2011 | Deool | Kanta | Film | |
| 2011 | Dhoosar | Nurse Mary | Film | |
| 2012 | Baba Lagin | | Film | |
| 2012 | Masala | | Film | |
| 2012 | Aiyyaa | Meenakshi's grandmother | Film | Hindi language |
| 2012 | Mokla Shwas | | | |
| 2012 | Samhita | | Film | |
| 2013 | Uney Purey Shahar Ek | | Play | |
| 2013 | Fandry | | Film | |
| 2016 | Sairat | | Film | |
| 2017 | Chi Va Chi Sau Ka | | Film | Zee Chitra Gaurav Puraskar for Best Supporting Actress |
| 2018 | Pad Man | | Film | |
| 2019 | Gully Boy | | Film | |
| 2020 | Ghost Stories | Granny | Netflix Anthology Film | |
| 2021 | Basta | Kamal Aaji | Marathi film | |
| 2023 | Dunki | Santosh Lakhanpal | Hindi | |
