= Valu (film) =

- Theatrical release poster
- Directed by: Umesh Vinayak Kulkarni
- Written by: Girish Kulkarni; Umesh Vinayak Kulkarni
- Produced by: Ganpat Kothari; Girish Kulkarni; Umesh Vinayak Kulkarni; Prashant Pethe; Nitin Vaidya
- Starring: Atul Kulkarni; Mohan Agashe; Bharati Achrekar; Dilip Prabhavalkar; Nirmiti Sawant; Amruta Subhash; Girish Kulkarni; Vrishasen Dabholkar
- Cinematography: Sudheer Palsane
- Music by: Mangesh Dhakde (Theme music)
- Release date: 25 January 2008
- Running time: 135 minutes
- Country: India
- Language: Marathi
- Box office: ₹3 crore (US$310,000)

Valu (translation: Bull) is a 2008 Indian comedy Marathi film directed by Umesh Vinayak Kulkarni. Umesh Kulkarni is an alumnus of FTII, Pune. The film featured in various international film festivals as The Wild Bull. It also became the first Marathi film to be selected in Rotterdam International Film Festival 2008, the Netherlands. It was the only Indian film which was allotted four screenings during the festival. Valu was the first marathi film for which Mukta Arts took over the worldwide distribution rights. Shanta Gokhale from Mumbai Mirror wrote "Not in a long time (or never?) have we had a film like Valu that gives us a village that is neither idealised, sensationalised nor sentimentalised, but is simply itself, like something out of a Madgulkar story".

== Plot ==
In the small village of Kusavde, there is a lonely misunderstood wild bull. The bull, "Durkya", is actually a holy, consecrated bull which is the responsibility of the village. It is allowed to roam free and is the responsibility of the entire village. But lately, Durkya becomes very aggressive and is blamed for every single act of chaos and destruction that happens in and around the village. Now, catching the bull becomes equivalent to establishing power in the village for the leaders and for those who are interested in the fringe benefits.

The film intertwines various stories of the war between the two leaders; love stories that bloom in the midst of the adventure; an amateur filmmaker who struggles to shoot a documentary; the forest officer who leads this chaos like a sacred mission along with the religious priest; the tricksters and an insane woman who seems to understand the mind of Durkya.

== Cast ==
- Atul Kulkarni as Swanand Gaddamwar aka "Foresht"
- Mohan Agashe as Sarapanch
- Bharati Achrekar as Sarapanch's Wife
- Girish Kulkarni as Jeevan Chaudhary
- Veena Jamkar as Tani
- Dilip Prabhavalkar as Pandit
- Nirmiti Sawant as Pandit's Wife
- Nandu Madhav as Aaba
- Renuka Daftardar as Aaba's Wife
- Mangesh Satpute as Shiva
- Amruta Subhash as Sangi
- Satish Tare as Satya
- Chandrakant Gokhale as Aaja
- Jyoti Subhash as Sakhubai
- Shrikant Yadav as Suresh
- Ashwini Giri as Suresh' Wife
- Deepak Alegaonkar as Shivai's Father
- Rajesh More as Sangi's father
- Meghana Vaidya as Sangi's Mother
- Siddheshwar Zadbuke as Popat
- Prashant Tapaswi as Shankrya
- Nikhil Raut as Ganya
- Vrishasen Dabholkar as Sameer (Swanand's Brother) aka "Dacumentary"
- Ashok Kulkarni as Jagnade
- Pournima Ganu as Gaddam's Wife
- Sharavi Kulkarni as Sampi
- Aditya Kulkarni as Sampat
- Raja (bull) as Valu

== Selection in film festivals ==
- 5th Asian Film Festival, 2007 Pune: Selected for screening as a closing film for the festival.
- 37th Rotterdam International Film Festival, 2008 the Netherlands
- 24th Warsaw International Film Festival, 2008 Poland
- 43rd Karlovy Vary International Film Festival, 2008 Czech Republic
- Reykjavik International Film Festival, 2008 Iceland
- La Rochelle International Film Festival, 2010 France

== Release ==
=== Theatrical release ===
The film was released theatrically, in India, on 25 January 2008.

=== Home media ===
The film is currently streaming on Ultra Jhakaas app.

== Awards and achievements ==
- Best Director: Umesh Vinayak Kulkarni, Best Cinematographer: Sudhir Palsane (Pune International Film Festival 2008)
- Best Eye-Catching Film of the Year, Best Supporting Actor: Girish Kulkarni (Zee Gaurav Awards 2008)
- Best Film of 2008, Best Director: Umesh Vinayak Kulkarni Maharashtra Times Awards - MaTa Sanman 2008)
