= Nahid Afrin =

Indian playback singer

- নাহিদ আফ্ৰিন
- Pronunciation: [naɦid aɸɹin]
- Born: Nahid Afrin Ansari; 13 December 2001 (age 24); Biswanath Chariali, Assam, India
- Citizenship: Indian
- Education: Cotton University (BA); St. Xavier's College, Mumbai (MA)
- Occupations: Singer; musician; social activist
- Awards: See below

UNICEF India Youth Advocate
- Incumbent
- Assumed office 3 May 2024

UNICEF India Child Rights Champion for the North-East
- Incumbent
- Assumed office 2018
- Musical career
- Origin: Assam
- Genres: Filmi; Indian pop; Indian folk; electronic
- Instrument: Vocals
- Works: Discography
- Years active: 2015–present
- Labels: T-Series; Times Music Axom; Dhwani Records; Kauzzy Records; Prag Music Media

Nahid Afrin (Note: Assamese: নাহিদ আফ্ৰিন, Assamese pronunciation: [naɦid aɸɹin].) (Assamese: নাহিদ আফ্ৰিন, pronounced [naɦid aɸɹin]; born 13 December 2001) is an Indian playback singer who made her debut in the 2016 Bollywood film Akira starring Sonakshi Sinha in the lead role. She first gained recognition as a singer as a participant in the 2015 edition of Indian Idol Junior. She was also seen in the reality show Little Champs North-East in 2013 where she was runner up.

== Early life ==
Nahid Afrin was born to Fatema Ansari and Anowar Ansari in Biswanath Chariali, Assam. She was born on 13 December 2001 and has a younger brother named Faiz Anower. Nahid started singing when she was just 3 years old. She first learnt music from "Biblee Bhagawati", her first guru. She studied music at Bhatkhande Kala Kendra in Assam. She passed her class 10 board exam from Little Star School, Biswanath Chariali. Nahid comes from a modest background as her father works in DRDA as a Junior Engineer.

Before her television appearances Nahid had performed at a number of venues in the state. She can sing in different languages including Hindi, Assamese, Western, Bengali and in many other local languages.

== Music career ==
Afrin was the first runner up in the 2015 edition of Indian Idol Junior. She made her debut as a singer in the 2016 Hindi film Akira.

== UNICEF Youth Advocate ==
Afrin has been appointed as the first 'Youth Advocate' of the northeastern region by UNICEF India to fight for child rights in December 2018.

== Awards and honors ==
- Honoured with the title SONIT KUWORI ( Princess of Sonit )
- " Achiever Award 2015 "- Pratidine Times
- " NEEDS EXCELLENCE AWARD 2015 " as YOUTH ICON (SINGING)
- " Prerna Award " As The Promising Best Singer For The Year 2017
- " Gana Adhikari promising artist award " In The Year 2017
- " Best Female Playback Singer " 2017 for the song DHUNIYA JON - Pride East Award 2017
- " 7th Assam State Film Award 2018 " - Best Playback Singer for the song AKULI BIKULI
- " Prag Cine Awards 2019 " - Best Female Playback Singer for the song SILA

== Discography ==
=== Playback singing ===
Year	Film	Song	Composer	Language	Co-singer
2016	Akira	Rajj Rajj Ke (1st Version)	Vishal–Shekhar	Hindi	Vishal Dadlani
2016	Akira	"Rajj Rajj Ke" (Remix Version)	Vishal–Shekhar	Hindi	Vishal Dadlani
2017	Chor: The Bicycle	"Sila"	Anurag Saikia	Assamese	Solo
2017	Priyar Priyo	"Akuli Bikuli"	Zubeen Garg	Assamese	Zubeen Garg
2017	Best of luck (Kahinoor Theatre)	"Uri Uri"	Poran Borkotoky (Jojo)	Assamese	Solo
2018	Nijanoor Gaan	Natun Junak	Jatin Sharma	Assamese	Solo
2026	Koka Deutar Hati Aru Nati 2	"Dusoku Nilimate Tholu"	Pranoy Dutta	Assamese	Prabin Borah

=== Patriotic songs ===
Year	Album	Song	Release	Language	Co-singer
2018	The Anthem Song of Assam	O Mur Apunar Desh	NRC ASSAM	Assamese	Zubeen Garg, Debojit Saha, Tarali Sarma & Pulak Banerjee
2017	Communal Harmony	Moromor Dekhkhoni	Xoseton Nagorik Monso, Assam	Assamese	Solo
2017	Communal Harmony	Ieer Bukut	Xoseton Nagorik Monso, Assam	Assamese	Solo

=== Album songs ===
Year	Album	Song	Composer	Language	Co-singer
2015	ALBUM SONG	Chhoona Hai Aasmaan	Sony Liv	Hindi	Indian Idol Junior-2 Top 10
2016	ALBUM SONG	MANN MERA BAWARA	Sony Liv	Hindi	Solo
2016	ALBUM SONG	AA DEKHEN ZARA	DJ AKS	Hindi	Ananya, Nithya, Vaishnav, Moti
2016	ALBUM SONG	MAA O MAA	Rupam Talukdar	Assamese	Solo
2016	SEWALI-2	Joonak ahi	Dibakar Bora	Assamese	Solo
2018	ALBUM SONG	EI XOMOI	Rupam Talukdar	Assamese	Solo
2017	ALBUM SONG	DHUNIYA JOON	Diganta Bharati	Assamese	Solo

=== Singles ===
Year	Song	Co-singer	Lyrics	Composer
2016	LAHE LAHE	Dr.Anjan Jyoti Choudhury	Dr. Saurav Kr. Bhuyan	Rupam Talukdar
2016	O BOHAG	Dr.Anjan Jyoti Choudhury	Dr. Anjan Jyoti Choudhury	Rupam Talukdar
2016	Kuwolir Xipare	Dr.Anjan Jyoti Choudhury	Jimoni Choudhury	Tapan Lahkar
2016	Noditu Asil Dhou	Solo	Monalisha Saikia	Mousam Borah
2017	Hridoi Hobone	Dr. Anjan Choudhury	Dr. Nirmal Prava Bordoloi	Rupam Talukdar
2017	KI JE ANUPAM [Tribute to Dr. Bhupen Hazarika]	Solo	Dr. Namita Deka	Mousam Borah
2018	JEEVAN [Tribute to Dr. BIRENDRA NATH DATTA]	Dr. Anjan Choudhury	Anuradha Das	Rupam Talukdar
