= Vrishasen Dabholkar =

Indian actor

- वृषसेंन दाभोळकर
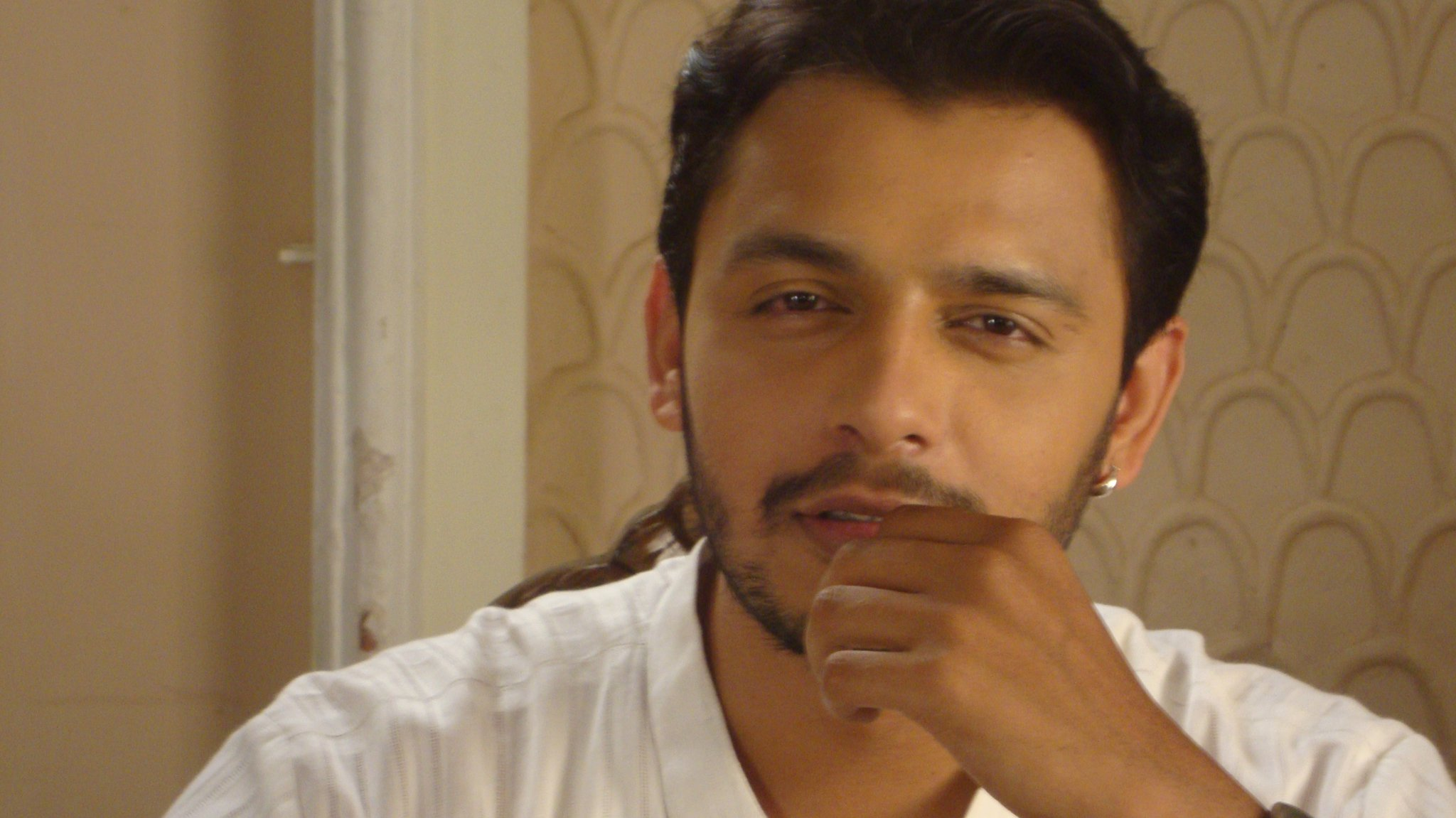
- Other names: Savaji – Tukaram (Film), Sameer – Valu (Film)
- Occupation: Actor
- Years active: 2004–present
- Known for: His portrayal in Dahavi Fa
- Parent(s): Sanjay Dabholkar & Vrishali Dabholkar

Vrishasen Dabholkar (Marathi: वृषसेंन दाभोळकर) is an Indian film actor born and brought up in Pune, Maharashtra.

== About Vrishasen ==
Vrishasen Dabholkar first acted at the age of five when he played the role of Bal Shivaji in the famous Marathi play Janata Raja.

He had performed in theatre, serials and movies and had won several awards.

Most recently he played the central character named 'DJ' in Balaji Telefilms Mission Dosti.com, a Marathi serial on Saam TV, which was a story of how social networking can be used by youth to help people in need.

Vrishasen was also the central character in the movie Dahavi Fa – a movie about the underdogs in the educational system, their anger and the channelisation of their violent attitude into a positive creative energy with the help of their teacher. He acted along with Atul Kulkarni, Jyoti Subhash, and Milind Gunaji in the movie.

In his first year of college, he won the Purshottam award for his acting where he represented his almamater Fergusson College, Pune. Vrishasen has won the Shahu Modak Puraskar for his contribution towards theatre and films along with the Best Actor award in National level French play competition organised by the Embassy of France. Other than working with the likes of Amol Palekar for a theatre production named Julus, he has also prominent roles in hit Marathi films like Dahavi Pha, Nati Goti, Valu, Amhi Satpute, Tukaram to name a few and a cameo in Dhol by director Priyadarshan.

Vrishasen Dabholkar was repulsed of female foeticide when he made his first documentary in college. A mass communication student, Vrishasen was introduced to Laadli-National Creative Excellence Awards for Social Change by his college after which he went ahead to win a category at the awards too.

== Early life ==
Vrishasen has done BA in Political Science from Fergusson College, Pune and Masters in Communication Studies (MCMS) from University of Pune. He has also done a degree course in French from Ranade Institute, Pune.

== Personal life ==
Vrishasen is the only son of Sanjay Dabholkar and Vrishali Dabholkar.

== Career ==
=== Films ===
Year	Show	Role	Notes
2012	Tukaram	Savaji	
2009	Aamhi Satpute	Harbharya	
2009	Manya Sajjana		
2009	Aaicha Gondhal		
2008	Valu	Sameer	
2007	Dhol	Paresh	Special appearance
2000	Dahavi Fa	Siddhu	

=== Fiction shows ===
Year	Show	Role	Channel
2018	Garja Maharashtra		Sony Marathi
2014	Asmita		Zee Marathi
2014	Lakshya		Star Pravah
2013	Mala Sasu Havi		Zee Marathi
2012–13	Mohini		DD Sahyadri
2012	Mission Dosti.com	DJ	Saam TV
2011–12	Ya Walnavar		ETV Marathi
2011	Tujvin Sakhya Re		Star Pravah
2010–11	Hi Vaat Dur Jate		Saam TV
2009–10	Hya Gojirwanya Gharat		ETV Marathi
2009	Kunku	Rajan	Zee Marathi
2008	Vahinisaheb	Dinesh	Zee Marathi
	Pahunchar		Saam TV
	Gaganala Pankh Nave		DD Sahyadri

=== Non-fiction shows ===
Year	Show	Role	Channel
2012–13	Jallosh Suvarnayugacha		ETV Marathi
2011	Gana Dhav Re		
2010	WOW		ETV Marathi

Vrishasen, is an advertising professional currently working with a leading advertising agency. He has successfully converted his hobby of copy writing and creative advertising to a full-time profession in the last couple of years. He recently started a Facebook page and Insta account @chummachatting for sharing his "create-witty" with his fans through social media.

== Awards ==
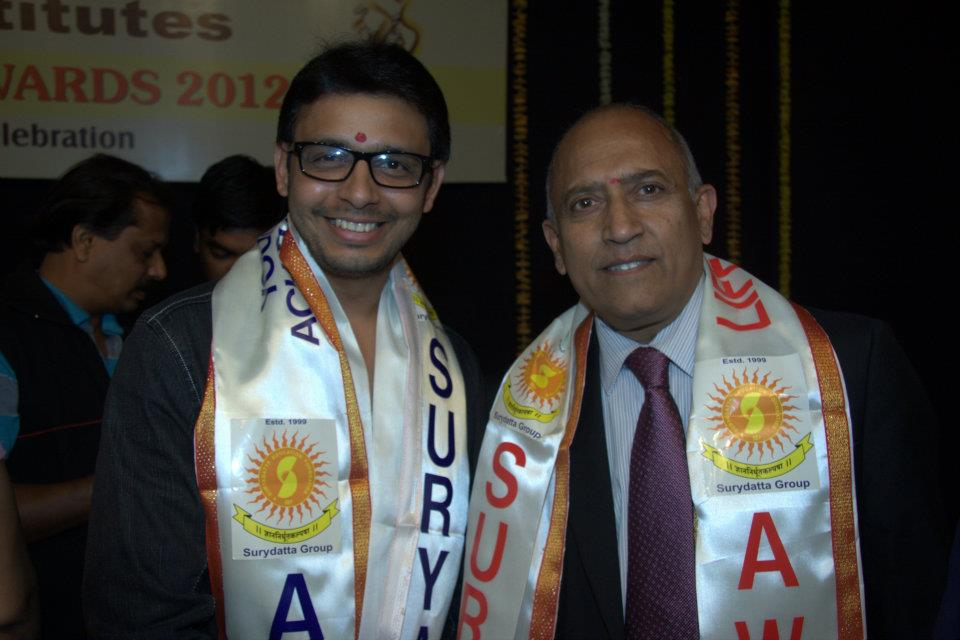
Vrishasen with Rakesh Sharma (Indian cosmonaut)at Suryadatta National Awards

1. Creative work on Print Advertisement featured in the prestigious Ads Of The Worlds 2017
2. Winner of Suryadatta National Award for Young Achiever 2012
3. Winner of UNFPA-Laadli National Creative Excellence Award for Social Change 2011 in the category of songs and lyrics ( Title -Song of Pronouns)
4. Winner of UNFPA-Laadli National Creative Excellence Award for Social Change 2008 in the category of TVC/Films. (Title– La Fille)
5. Winner of Sakaal Reflections PSA contest 2008
6. Winner of Shahu Modak Puraskar 2004 for his contribution towards theatre and films
