= Nirop =

- Promotional release poster
- Directed by: Sachin Kundalkar
- Written by: Sachin Kundalkar; Sunil Sukthankar (lyrics)
- Produced by: Aparna Dharmadhikari
- Starring: Sameer Dharmadhikari; Devika Daftardar
- Cinematography: Milind Jog
- Edited by: Abhijeet Deshpande
- Music by: Shrirang Umrani; Anmol Bhave (audiography)
- Release date: 28 December 2007
- Country: India
- Language: Marathi

Nirob (transl. Farewell) is a 2007 Marathi film directed by Sachin Kundalkar and produced by Aparna Dharmadhikari under the banner Salaam Cinema. The film stars Sameer Dharmadhikari and Devika Daftardar in the leading roles.

The film won the Best Feature Film in Marathi Award at the 55th National Film Awards. The award citation mentions the film as "An original offbeat film that gives a fresh perspective of the internal landscapes of the human mind".

== Plot ==
Shekhar (Sameer Dharmadhikari) and Jui (Devika Daftardar) are married for three years and are a relatively happy couple. Shekhar is a flautist and has a music assignment in France. Before leaving for France, he wants to visit his hometown one last time. So he takes a short trip to Konkan, along with Jui. On their holiday, they are joined by their friends; Shekhar’s bold and forward friend and MTV Producer Tara, his French music companion Per Barrow and Jui's brother Ishant who aspires to be a music director.

In the tranquility and peacefulness of the place, each character recognises their inner discontent. Everyone realises the unhappiness behind their seemingly happy lives. Finally when they are ready to leave, several of them realise that the trip has been life-altering for them.

== Cast ==
- Sameer Dharmadhikari as Shekhar
- Devika Daftardar as Jui
- Gauri Kulkarni as Tara
- Astad Kale as Ishant
- Seema Deshmukh as Sarita
- Cyrille Larrieu as Pierre Bérault
- Shreeram Ranade
- Ujwala Jog
- Abhay Shukla as Naseer

== Awards ==
National Film Awards

- Won - National Film Award for Best Feature Film in Marathi
