= Akira (2016 Hindi film) =

2016 film by A. R. Murugadoss

- Theatrical release poster
- Directed by: A. R. Murugadoss
- Written by: Additional Screenplay and Dialogues: Anurag Kashyap; Dialogues: Karan Singh Rathore
- Screenplay by: Santha Kumar; A. R. Murugadoss
- Story by: Santha Kumar
- Based on: Mouna Guru (2011) by Santha Kumar
- Produced by: Fox Star Studios; A.R. Murugadoss
- Starring: Sonakshi Sinha; Konkana Sen Sharma; Anurag Kashyap
- Cinematography: R. D. Rajasekhar
- Edited by: A. Sreekar Prasad
- Music by: Score: John Stewart Eduri; Songs: Vishal–Shekhar
- Production companies: Fox Star Studios; A.R. Murugadoss Productions
- Distributed by: Fox Star Studios
- Release date: 2 September 2016
- Running time: 136 minutes
- Country: India
- Language: Hindi
- Budget: ₹3.6 crore
- Box office: est. ₹15.06 crore

Akira is a 2016 Indian Hindi-language action thriller film co-written, produced and directed by A. R. Murugadoss. It is a remake of the 2011 Tamil-language film Mouna Guru, and features Sonakshi Sinha, Konkana Sen Sharma and Anurag Kashyap in the lead roles.

Principal photography began in March 2015, and the film was released worldwide on 2 September 2016. The soundtrack composed by Vishal–Shekhar, was released on 16 August 2016. The film received mixed reviews from critics with praise for the performances of the cast but criticism for the writing of the film.

A tie-in action mobile video game, titled Akira: The Game, was also released along with the film. The video game was developed by Vroovy.

== Plot ==
Akira Sharma, a young girl, witnesses a group of men throwing acid on a woman's face. She helps the police catch one of the criminals and is therefore harassed by the accused, who slashes her face out of revenge, giving her a scar. Subsequently, her father enrolls her in a self-defense class. A couple of days later, she comes across the same men who had escaped earlier and tries to catch them. One of them tries to throw acid on her, but it ends up on his own face in the brawl. Akira is arrested, convicted, and sent to a remand home for the attack.

8 years later, Akira is released and later grows into a rebellious tough woman. When she starts going to college, her brother comes to pick her mother and her. And hence she moves from Jodhpur to Mumbai. She joins a college and begins living in a hostel, where she finds it difficult to adjust to normal life. The college is also dealing with a thieving student, as more and more electronics keep getting stolen. When a corrupt and drunk-on-power police officer, ACP Rane hits an elderly college professor with his car and then beats him up, the college students take out a massive protest. The protests turn violent, however Akira patiently waits to hand over their petition to the Commissioner.

A couple of days later, Rane goes to help a car crash victim but robs and kills him, when he finds loot in his trunk. His girlfriend, Maya, who is in the same college as Akira, secretly records his conversation about evidence disposal. Her bag with the camera is, however, stolen, and someone starts blackmailing Rane. Suspecting Maya, he brutally kills her. Despite his insistence, the case is handled by SP Rabiya, who suspects Maya's murder.

Meanwhile, the college announces that they will pardon the electronic thief if they return all the stolen items anonymously. Akira finds a bag full of stolen items, including the camera, in front of her dorm. Rane's associates catch her with the camera and decide to kill her and two other witnesses. She, however, escapes when the men reload their gun after killing the other two.

Rane and his men, declare Akira to be mentally unstable. Given her violent past and her rebellious behaviour, her family members as well as her friends are easily convinced. She is taken away to a mental asylum, and, with the help of a corrupt doctor, they give her electric shocks to drive her insane. With the help of another mentally ill patient, she brutally murders the doctors and the guards and escapes. She abducts one of Rane's associates and blackmails him to prove her innocence. Rane, however, traces her hideout and attacks it. Rabiya, with an arrest-warrant for Rane, arrives and seizes all the arms but is stopped by the Commissioner, as the car-crash victim was the brother of a major politician – something which will lead to riots if the news of his murder breaks out. Rane gets back the charge, and the commissioner orders him to take Akira to a mental asylum.

Helpless, Rabiya leaves but quietly carries along the seized arms, leaving those inside unarmed. This enrages Akira easily kills Rane and his associates in hand-to-hand combat and then goes back to the mental asylum. Completely sane, she is released three months later. In the end, she starts living her late father's life in Jodhpur and is living peacefully there teaching deaf children.

== Cast ==
- Sonakshi Sinha as Akira Sharma
  - Mishiekka Arora as young Akira
- Konkona Sen Sharma as SP Rabiya Sultan IPS
- Anurag Kashyap as ACP Govind Rane IPS
- Rose J Kaur as Sister Marlyn
- Raai Laxmi as Maya Amin, Rane's girlfriend
- Teena Singh as Nikki, a college bully
- Phalguni Khanna as an acid attack victim
- Amit Sadh as Dr. Siddharth "Sid" Nerurkar, Shilpa's brother
- Urmila Mahanta as Anna Jain, the college Principal's daughter
- Lokesh Vijay Gupte as Inspector Dinesh Manik, Rane's associate
- Chaitanya Choudhury as Ajay Sharma, Akira's elder brother
  - Taher Penwala as young Ajay
- Ashish Dixit as Vishal, Shilpa's brother and Akira's friend
- Smita Jaykar as Akira's mother
- Ankita Karan Patel as Shilpa Sharma, Ajay's wife
- Saurabh Goyal as Sunil Vij, Maya's friend
- Nandu Madhav as Inspector Rajeshwar Raai, Rane's associate
- Krishna Bhatt as David
- Uday Sabnis as Constable Bapu Raao
- Narsingh Pandey as Akira's college professor
- Arun Verma as Akira's psychiatrist
- Atul Kulkarni as Jignesh Sharma, Akira's father (special appearance)
- Kajol Saroj as a patient at the asylum
- Shyam Bhimsaria as the comic Drunkard during the bathroom fight

== Music ==
Akira

Soundtrack album by Vishal–Shekhar
- Released: 16 August 2016
- Genre: Feature Film soundtrack
- Length: 24:25
- Label: T-Series
- Producers: Vishal–Shekhar; John Stewart Eduri; Aditya N. Abhijeet Nalani; DJ Kiran Kamath

Vishal–Shekhar chronology
Sultan (2016)	Akira (2016)	Banjo (2016)

The songs featured in the film were composed by the duo Vishal–Shekhar. The background score of the film was composed by John Stewart Eduri.

The song Kehkasha Tu Meri is a remake of the duo's Marathi song Harvali Pakhare from the 2012 film Balak-Palak, sung by Shekhar Ravjiani.

Akira (Original Motion Picture Soundtrack)
No.	Title	Singer(s)	Length
1.	"Rajj Rajj Ke" (Version 1)	Sonakshi Sinha, Vishal Dadlani	4:20
2.	"Purza"	Arijit Singh	3:35
3.	"Kehkasha Tu Meri"	Shekhar Ravjiani	3:02
4.	"Rajj Rajj Ke" (Version 2)	Nahid Afrin, Vishal Dadlani	4:20
5.	"Baadal"	Sunidhi Chauhan	4:49
6.	"Rajj Rajj Ke" (Remix by DJ Kiran Kamath)	Nahid Afrin, Vishal Dadlani	4:19
Total length:			24:25

== Reception ==
=== Critical reception ===
On review aggregator website Rotten Tomatoes, the film holds an approval rating of 33% based on 9 reviews, with an average rating of 5.60/10.

Anupama Chopra giving the film 2.5/5, praised the performances of Sinha, Kashyap and Sharma, but criticised the second half. She wrote that "Anurag [Kashyap] gives Rane just the right touches of menace and sleaze." The second half, however, "strikes so badly in this film that it almost completely negates the first half, which is effective."

Anna M.M. Vetticad, praised the acting but criticised the character development. For Sinha's character, she wrote, "Akira is the most poorly fleshed out character in the entire story...a woman who can fight as skillfully and strongly as any man. That is it. The workings of her mind, her motivations and her feelings, remain a mystery." She, however, praised Kashyap's portrayal of Rane, calling it the "best-written character" whose "drug-addled brain is never so clouded as to make him lose sight of his self-interest."

Writing for Reuters, Shilpa Jamkhandikar praised the acting but criticised the writing calling it a mashup of "many half-baked sub-plots" and very similar in style to cop movies from the 80s. She believes that "[Akira] is a great example of a movie with a timely topic that suffers from outdated treatment." She, however, praised Kahyap's character, Rane, writing "[he] channels every 80s bad cop character we've seen. If it wasn't for him, "Akira" would have been a complete loss as a film."

=== Box office ===
==== India ====
The film collected ₹56 million (US$600,000) on its opening day in India. By the end of its first weekend, Akira had grossed ₹170 million (US$1.8 million) and its first week collection was approximately ₹223 million (US$2.4 million) domestically.

==== Overseas ====
Akira collected ₹14.2 million (US$150,000) from North America (America and Canada), ₹28.2 million (US$300,000) from UAE, ₹6.1 million (US$65,000) from UK. The film collected ₹7.8 million (US$83,000) from Pakistan.
