= Nandu Madhav =

Indian actor

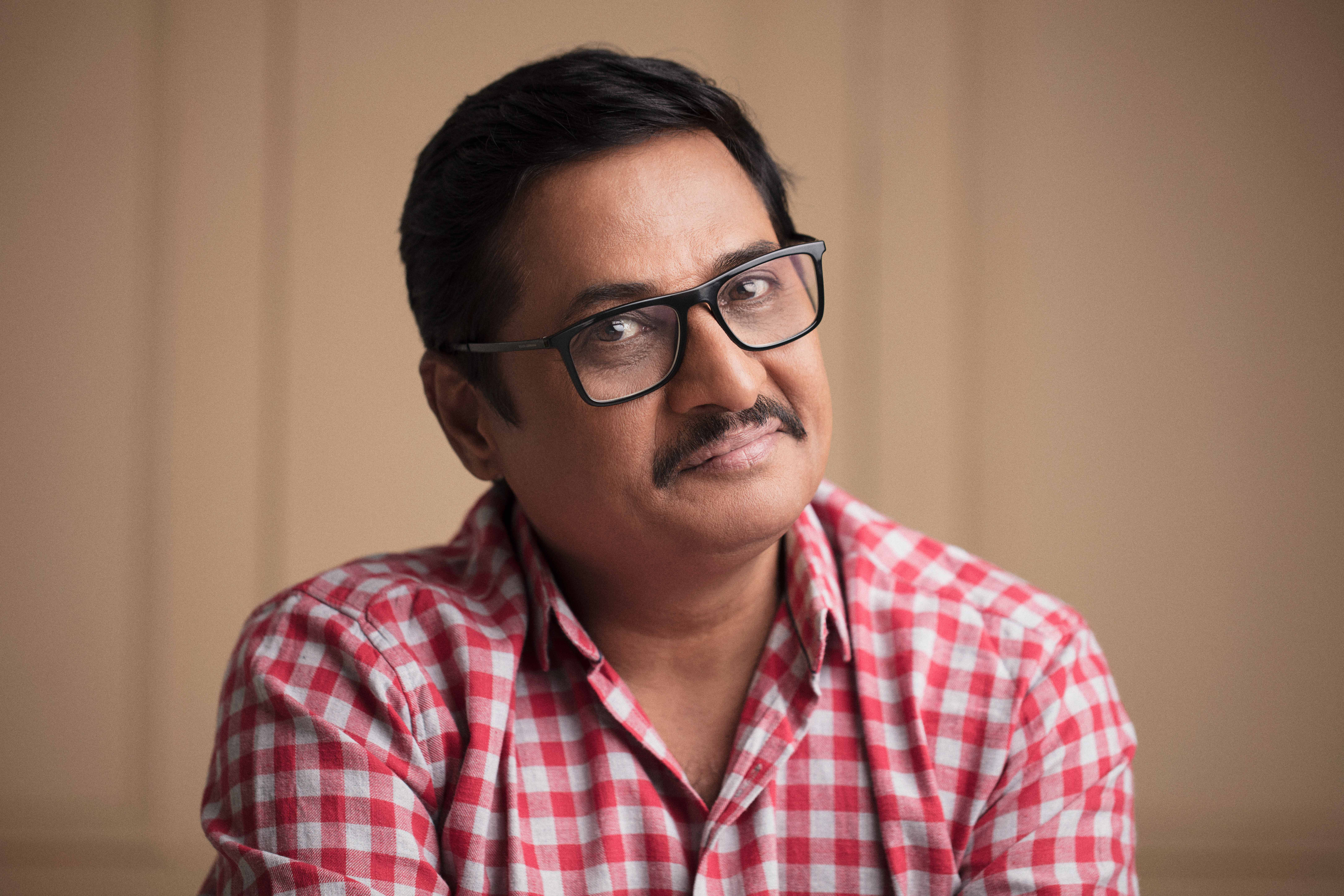
- Occupations: Actor, director, writer
- Years active: 1995–present
- Parent(s): Madhav; Parvati
- Website: http://nandumadhav.com/

Nandu Madhav is an Indian actor known for his works in Marathi cinema and theatre. He is known for his title role in Paresh Mokashi's Harishchandrachi Factory which won the Best Feature Film in Marathi award in the 56th National Film Awards in 2008. He won a Filmfare Award Marathi for Best Supporting Actor for his performance in the 2022 film, Y (2022).

== Early life ==
Nandu Madhav completed his school training in Gevrai, Beed district. He earned his BSc and LL.B. (gen) degrees from Dr. Babasaheb Ambedkar Marathwada University in Aurangabad, Maharashtra.

== Career ==
Madhav played a role in the Marathi movie Bangarwadi (1995). Madhav has also appeared in Hindi movies such as Daayraa and Jis Desh Mein Ganga Rehta Hain. He is also known for his role of an educated villager fighting for justice in the 1998 hit film Sarkarnama.

In 2012, he coordinated a play called Shivaji Underground in Bhimnagar Mohalla, which attempts to shed light on legacy appropriation of Maratha King Chhatrapati Shivaji.

== Filmography ==
Film	Role	Director	Language	Year	Ref(s)
P. S. I. Arjun	PI Vinayak Rane	Bhushan Patel	Marathi	2025	
Taali	Inspector Dinkar Sawant	Ravi Jadhav	Hindi	2023	
Scam 2003	Inspector Madhukar Dombe	Tushar Hiranandani	Hindi	2023	
Y (2022)	Jai	Ajit Suryakant	Marathi	2022	
Dial 100	Chandrakanth Pallav aka Chandu	Rensil D'Silva	Hindi	2021	
Cargo	Nitigya	Arati Kadav	Hindi	2019	
Simmba	Akruti's Father	Rohit Shetty	Hindi	2018	
Barayan	Anirudha's Father	Deepak Patil	Marathi	2018	
Akira	Inspector Rajeshwar	A.R. Murugadoss	Hindi	2016	
Main Aur Charles	In. Sudhakar Zhende	Prawaal Raman	Hindi	2015	
Celluloid	Dada Saheb Phalke	Kamal	Malayalam	2013	
Tapaal	Devram (Postman)	Laxman Utekar	Marathi	2013	
Mukkti	Bhanudas (Farmer)	Machindra More	Marathi	2012	
Jana Gana Mana	Mr. Sontakke (Teacher)	Amit Abhyankar	Marathi	2012	
Shala	Joshi's Father	Sujay Dahake	Marathi	2012	
Marmabandh	Mitra	Dinesh Bhonsle	Marathi	2010	
Harishchandrachi Factory	Dadasaheb Phalke	Paresh Mokashi	Marathi	2009	
Valu	Aba Renuse	Umesh Vinayak Kulkarni	Marathi	2008	
Darpan Ke Pichye	Aniket	Rajkumar Bhan	Hindi	2005	
Dr. Babasaheb Ambedkar	Gangadhar Nilkanth Sahasrabuddhe	Jabbar Patel	English	2000	
Jis Desh Mein Ganga Rehta Hain	Iqbal	Mahesh Manjrekar	Hindi	2000	
Shool	Lalji	E. Nivas	Hindi	1999	
Sarkarnama	Chander Naik	Shrawani Deodhar	Marathi	1998	
Dayara	Abducter Kidnapper	Amol Palekar	Hindi	1996	
Katha Don Ganapatravanchi	Sahebrao	Arun Khopkar	Marathi	1996	
Bangarwadi	Ananda Ramoshi	Amol Palekar	Marathi	1995	

== Plays ==
Play	Writer	Director	Type	Year	Ref(s)
Jawan Trambak	Makarand Deshpande	Makarand Deshpande	Hindi play	2000	
Sanman Haouse	Shyam Manohar	Deepak Rajadhyaksha	Marathi play	2005	
Shobha Yatra	Shafat Khan	Ganesh Yadav	Sociopolitical Satire	1999	
Amhi Latike Na Bolu	P. L. Deshpande	Vikram Watve	Comedy play	1994	
Wada Chirebandi, Magn Talyakathi, Yugant	Mahesh Elkunchwar	Chandrakant Kulkarni	Trilogy (9 hrs. Play)	1994	
Faust	Gaute	Fritze Benewitz	German play	1994	
Bambai Ke Kauve	Shafat Khan	Ganesh Yadav	Hindi Satire	1992	
Dr. Tummhi Sudhha	Ajit Dlavi	Chandrakant Kulkarni	Discussion play	1991	
Doosra Samana	Satish Alekar	Waman Kendre	Sociopolitical	1989	
Ghar Ghar	Harsh Shivcharan	Harsh Shivsharan	Marathi play	1988	

== Awards For Movie ==
Festival / Awards	Category	Result
Bangarwadi (Year-1995)	Best Comedy Actor (Maharashtra state)	Won
Harishchandrachi Factory (Year-2010)	Screen Award Best Actor	Won
Tapal (Year-2013)	Screen Award Best Actor	Won
Jan Gan Man (Year-2012)	Vishesh Parikshak Award (Maharashtra state)	Won
Shala (Year-2012)	Vishesh Parikshak Award (Maharashtra state)	Won
Mukkti (Year-2012)	Vishesh Parikshak Award (Maharashtra state)	Won
Filmfare Marathi Awards – (2023)	Best Supporting Actor - Y (2022)	Won

== Drama Awards ==
Drama	Category	Result
Dusara Samana	Best Actor (Maharashtra state)	Won
Dr. Tumhi Sudha	Best Actor (Maharashtra state)	Won
Hurhunnari	Natyadarpan Award	Won
