= Samaantar =

- DVD cover
- Directed by: Amol Palekar
- Written by: Sandhya Gokhale
- Starring: Amol Palekar; Sharmila Tagore; Radhika Apte; Sameer Dharmadhikari; Kishore Kadam; Vandana Gupte
- Cinematography: Asim Bose
- Edited by: Abhijeet Deshpande
- Music by: Anand Modak
- Production company: BIG Pictures
- Distributed by: BIG Pictures
- Release date: 4 September 2009
- Running time: 105 minutes
- Country: India
- Language: Marathi

Samaantar (translation: Parallel) is a 2009 Indian Marathi-language drama film directed by Amol Palekar and written by Sandhya Gokhale. The film stars Amol Palekar and Sharmila Tagore (in her debut in Marathi cinema) in lead roles and Radhika Apte, Sameer Dharmadhikari, Kishore Kadam and Vandana Gupte in supporting roles. Palekar's previous film in the dual role of actor and director was Ankahee (1985).

== Plot ==
Samaantar talks about a simple lost-and-found tale of a man and a woman, but in an artistic manner. Keshav Vaze is an eminent businessman in Pune, who started his life struggle from a small village and is now the owner of his large industrial empire. His business kept on growing larger and larger, making his day stacked with board meetings, conventions and tours. Keshav became a dear public figure surrounded by many people, but the days ended in the cluttered darkness of his own melancholy as years after years, Keshav has hidden his mysterious grief within himself. As a youngster, Keshav was a mute witness to the major tragedy of a massive earthquake at his village, which caused the deaths of his parents and siblings and forced Keshav to take up the responsibility to support his late brother's children, sacrificing his own life. On his 60th birthday, Keshav decides to find serenity for himself and expresses his desire to retire from business when he feels that as a guardian of his late brother's children, he has reached a stage to retire from his life too, and shockingly takes the major decision of ending his life in the name of voluntary death.

The film unfolds the mystery behind his decision of calling for early declaration from life when Keshav visits Kolkata with his two psychiatrist accquaintances, Dr. Paritosh and Dr. Nikumbh, on an invitation from a medical foundation, where he has donated a huge sum of money for the construction of a hospital. While there, a slice of Keshav's frozen past accidentally gets scratched by the sudden glimpse of his long-lost college sweetheart, Shama, who was once the anchor of his existence. Her mesmerizing beauty, poise and silence personify his vacuum of last 40 years. Shama is living like a patient still under trauma as a sculptor, who hardly ever speaks to anyone and is a recluse immersed in violin and pottery. Moreover, it also turns out that she is the single mother of Paritosh and that Keshav is his biological father.

The film does not bring out the past relationship between the two in their first meeting after years, but unfolds the same in the very next meeting, when Keshav's adopted daughter, Reva, brings him back to Kolkata for a change after noticing his withdrawal symptoms from the family members. Keshav strives to learn more about Shama and realises the mockery of their fate as both had drifted apart walking their separate paths, sharing their loneliness. Both Keshav and Shama are eventually drawn to one another once again, and the suggestion is that while love can cause the gravest injury to the heart, it is perhaps the only emotion that comes with a curative power. Refreshingly, no one around Keshav or Shama, including Reva, Paritosh or Nikumbh, raise an eyebrow when their attachment for each other becomes obvious and there is a tacit understanding they demonstrate.

== Cast ==
- Amol Palekar as Keshav Vaze
- Sharmila Tagore as Shama Vaze
- Radhika Apte as Reva (Keshav's adopted daughter)
- Sameer Dharmadhikari as Dr. Paritosh (Keshav's biological son)
- Kishore Kadam as Dr. Nikumbh (Paritosh's colleague)
- Aishwarya Narkar as Nira Vaze (Keshav's niece)
- Makarand Deshpande as Makarand (Nira's estranged husband)
- Vandana Gupte as Jyotsna Saxena (Keshav's college friend)

== Music ==
- "Kai Jahale Tula Mana Re" - Shreya Ghoshal, Shankar Mahadevan
- "Navika Re Hati Tuzya" - Sudesh Bhosale
- "Nuste Nuste Dole Bhartana" (duet) - Shreya Ghoshal, Shankar Mahadevan
- "Nuste Nuste Dole Bhartana" (female) - Shreya Ghoshal
- "Nuste Nuste Dole Bhartana" (male) - Shankar Mahadevan
