= Sleepwalking Land (film) =

- Directed by: Teresa Prata
- Screenplay by: Teresa Prata (based on the eponymous novel by Mia Couto)
- Produced by: Filmes de Fundo, Ebano Multimedia, ICAM, Radiotelevisão Portuguesa (RTP), ZDF Arte
- Starring: Nick Lauro Teresa, Aldino José, Hélio Fumo, Ilda Gonzalez, Laura Soveral
- Cinematography: Dominique Gentil
- Edited by: Paulo Ebelo, Jacques Witta
- Music by: Alex Goretzki
- Release date: 2007
- Running time: 103'
- Countries: Germany; Mozambique; Portugal

Sleepwalking Land is a 2007 film based on the eponymous novel by Mia Couto. The film took its director Teresa Prata seven years to complete.

== Synopsis ==
In Mozambique, the civil war causes devastation among the population. Amongst this chaos, young Muidinga dreams of finding his family. One day, he finds a diary on a lifeless body in a gunned-down bus; it speaks of a woman searching for her son. Convinced that he's the missing son, Muidinga decides to find her. On his journey he's accompanied by an old man, Tuahir, always ready to tell a tale. Their journey is a battle, and turns them into somnambulists in a country devastated by war.

== Awards ==
- FIPRESCI Award for Best Film, International Film Festival of Kerala (India), 2007.
- Best Director, Pune International Film Festival (India).
- Famafest (Portugal)
- Festival Cinema Africano, Asi, America Latina de Milano (Italia)
- Festival Indie Lisboa (Portugal)
