= The Damned Rain =

Gabhricha Paus
- Theatrical release poster
- Directed by: Satish Manwar
- Written by: Satish Manwar
- Produced by: Prashant Pethe
- Starring: Sonali Kulkarni; Girish Kulkarni; Jyoti Subhash; Veena Jamkar; Aman Attar
- Cinematography: Sudheer Palsane
- Edited by: Suchitra Sathe
- Music by: Dattaprasad Ranade
- Release date: 10 July 2009 (Rotterdam)
- Running time: 1 hrs 35 Mins
- Country: India
- Language: Marathi

Gabhricha Paus (Marathi: Gabhricha Paus, English: The Damned Rain) is a 2009 Marathi-language film written and directed by Satish Manwar. Gabhricha Paus has been produced by Prashant Penthe and released on 10 July 2009.

== Plot ==
The film is about the life of a farmer Kisna (Girish Kulkarni), who is trying to get a good crop in the drought-stricken Vidarbha region, which has been notorious for farmer suicides. It also allegorically tells about how lack of information and education amongst the farmers, can ruin them, despite their indefatigable spirit.

After, the debt-ridden neighbour Bhaskar Deshmukh commits suicide, amongst many other farmers of the region, Kisna's wife Alka (Sonali Kulkarni) observes Kisna's aloofness and interprets that Kisna is contemplating suicide too. She asks their 6-year-old son Dinu (Aman Attar) to keep a watch on Kisna, and report any irregular behavior. Kisna is however imbued by the thoughts of the arrival of the Monsoon.

During these days, Alka tries her best by preparing Puran Poli amongst other myriad efforts to keep Kisna in good spirit. However, Kisna being inherently stronger than his peer farmers, albeit aloof, is often annoyed by the overt and misplaced concern of his wife.

Pawning jewelry, Kisna purchases cotton seeds from Nagpur City, intending to sow them when the rains arrive. The seeds fail to germinate, due to the late arrival of the monsoons and this is the only time in the entire movie Kisna contemplates suicide, by consuming pesticide. However, Alka sells other jewelry and purchases a fresh set of seeds, which are sowed. Due to the vagaries of the rain, Kisna is able to reap only two quintals of cotton, which is taken away by the money-lender/cotton trader, leaving Kisna's family with nothing.

Meanwhile, Kisna, with his indefatigable spirit, goes to a bank in the city, takes a loan and installs a bore-well in his farm, despite the perpetual pessimism of Patil. The bore-well itself doesn't work to its potential due to the erratic power supply, typical of the hinterlands of Vidarbha. At this stage, Patil gives Kisna the idea of drawing electric power from the Electric power transmission lines.

Kisna never gives up even till the end, where ill-advised, he naively tries to tap electric power from the high voltage Electric power transmission lines to power his water pump of the recently installed bore-well and loses his life by electrocution.

== Cast ==
- Sonali Kulkarni as Alka
- Girish Kulkarni as Kisna
- Jyoti Subhash as Grandmother
- Veena Jamkar as Anjana
- Aman Attar as Dinu
- Mukund Vasule as Patil
- Madhukar Dhore as Anjana's Father-in-Law
- Rajesh More as Cotton trader
- Vinod Raut as Gajnya
- Amit Patil as Bhaskar
- Shekhar Barne as School Teacher

== Reception ==
- Best Marathi Film - Pune International Film Festival, India (2009)
- Special Jury Award - Maharashtra State Film Awards, India (2009)
- Best Editing Award - Ahmadabad International Film Festival, India (2009)
- Awarded - Hubert Bals Fund for Distribution
- Official Selection - Festival International du film de Rotterdam, Netherlands
- Official Selection - Transylvania International Film Festival, Romania
- Official Selection - Durban International Film festival, South Africa
- Official Selection - Indian Film Festival of Los Angeles (IFFLA), LA
- Official Selection - Vancouver International film festival, Canada
- Official Selection - Warsaw International film festival, Poland
- Official Selection - Bollywood and Beyond, Stuttgart, Germany
- Official Selection - Habitat Film Festival, New Delhi, India
- Official Selection - Goa Marathi Film festival, India
- Official Selection - Kolhapur International Film Festival, India
- First Prize - BMM Convention Film Festival, Philadelphia, USA
