= Dahavi Fa =

- DVD cover
- Directed by: Sumitra Bhave and Sunil Sukthankar
- Story by: Sumitra Bhave
- Produced by: Sunil Sukthankar
- Starring: Atul Kulkarni; Jyoti Subhash; Milind Gunaji, Nimish Kathale and Vrishasen Dabholkar
- Music by: Shrirang Umrani
- Distributed by: Everest Entertainment Pvt. Ltd.
- Release date: 17 February 2002
- Country: India
- Language: Marathi

Dahavi Fa (Marathi: दहावी फ; translation: Tenth 'F') is a Marathi drama film released on 17 February 2002. Produced by Sunil Sukthankar and directed by Sumitra Bhave and Sunil Sukthankar, the film stars Atul Kulkarni, Jyoti Subhash, Milind Gunaji, Nimish Kathale and Vrushasen Dabholkar. The film's music is composed by Shrirang Umrani.

The film is based on a story of how teachers discriminate against the students failing the exams. Atul Kulkarni, who plays the teacher in the film, however teaches students to channelize their anger in a positive way. The film did well at the box office and was screened for 35 weeks in Pune.

== Plot ==
Kids from class 10 'F' realized that they are the victims of brutal discrimination. They were not willing to accept tags like goons or thugs. Frustrated with the situation, these kids decide to take matters in their own hands and ended up vandalizing school properties. As a result, they get suspended from school.

Finally a courageous teacher steps up and confronts the biased approach of the school based on the education system and rallies these kids to channel anger in a positive way.

== Cast ==
- Atul Kulkarni as Ganesh Deshmukh
- Jyoti Subhash as Teacher
- Milind Gunaji as Teacher
- Nimish Kathale as Student
- Vrishasen Dabholkar as Student
- Makarand Purohit as Student
- Satish Tare as Pattya

== Soundtrack ==
The music has been directed by Shrirang Umrani.

No.	Title	Length
1.	"Khushi Cheharyaavar Majhya Kaa Naahi Yenaar"	5:58
2.	"O Sir O Sir Amhi Kelacha Kaay"	4:32
3.	"Shudhi De Buddhi De He Dayaghana"	5:11
4.	"Srushti Che Mitra Aami"	4:48
5.	"Dahavi Fa"	5:39
6.	"Tumipan Sahi Aamhipan Sahi"	5:17

== Awards ==
Maharashtra State Film Awards

- 2003 - Best Feature Film
- 2003 - Best Story Award to Sumitra Bhave
- 2003 - Best Lyrics to Sumitra Bhave for the song "Khushi Cheheryavar Mazhya"
- 2003 - Best Music Director to Shriram Umrani
