= Cobalt Blue (novel) =

2013 novel by Sachin Kundalkar

- First English edition
- Author: Sachin Kundalkar
- Language: English
- Genre: Fiction; Drama
- Publisher: Penguin Books
- Publication date: May 2013
- Publication place: India
- Media type: Print (Paperback)
- Pages: 399
- ISBN: 9351187012

Cobalt Blue is a 2013 fictional drama novel by Indian film director, screenwriter and playwright Sachin Kundalkar. It was the debut novel of Kundalkar and first published in 2006 in Marathi language, it was re-released in English in 2013 with translation by Jerry Pinto. The story follows two siblings, Tanay and Anuja, who fall in love with their paying guest at their house in Pune. The novel deals with the theme of sexuality, family and society.

== Development ==
Kundalkar wrote Cobalt Blue right after he had shifted to Mumbai at the age of 22. He said he had "nothing else to do" so he started writing Tanay's monologue and later Anuja's. He started writing it at age 20 and finished it at 22. He then showed it to his friends who said it was a novel. It was later published in 2006 in Marathi language. In 2013, Jerry Pinto read the novel after Shanta Gokhale insisted him to read and liked it. He then served as the novel's English translator. Kundalkar said that he read the manuscript of Pinto's version, "I realised that it was very organically done. It was not technically correct. It was emotionally correct." Pinto said that he read the novel to his Marathi teacher after translating it for suggestions. He then also read it to Gokhale and finally to Kundalkar after her approval over the language.

== Reception ==
Somak Ghoshal of Mint said in his review, "with its complex narrative design and daring imagination, [the novel] easily surpasses most English-language fiction that has appeared in India so far this year." Joanna Lobo of Daily News and Analysis wrote: Cobalt Blue is a book that will engulf you when you are reading it, and haunt you much after you're done." She also called Kundalkar’s observations on life as "sharp and witty." Sandip Roy of Firstpost said that the novel "raises provocative questions about the power of love and the many way one transgresses in its name."

A review carried by Publishers Weekly wrote: "In his debut novel, Kundalkar combines two distinct and complementary voices to deliver a complex and intricate story about love, family, and making one’s own path." Saaz Aggarwal of The Hindu called it a "high-quality coming-of-age novel" that explores the "discovery, resulting confusion, and bravado of homosexuality in a hostile environment." Author Kamila Shamsie wrote: "A mesmerizing novel of heartbreak, memory, and the ease of falling in love set against the impossibility of fully knowing other people."

Anita Desai called the novel "intriguing and original". Janice Pariat wrote: "Kundalkar’s writing is masterful in its play of voice, capturing through his characters the claustrophobia of a small town, their longing to escape a middle class existence, and how love, and being in love, has the ability to transform every small detail from the mundane to the magnificent."

== Adaptation ==
In November 2018, it was announced that the novel will be adapted into a feature film of the same name for Netflix. It has been written and directed by Kundalkar and was scheduled for streaming on the platform starting December 3, 2021, but was postponed. It was released finally on 2 April 2022.
