= Chor: The Bicycle =

- Directed by: Khanjan Kishore Nath
- Written by: Khanjan Kishore Nath
- Screenplay by: Khanjan Kishore Nath
- Story by: Khanjan Kishore Nath
- Produced by: Sanjive Narain
- Starring: Gunjan Saikia; Purabi Saikia; Raktim Gayan; Sachin Nath; Seema Baruah
- Cinematography: Jayanth Mathavan
- Edited by: Bikash Dutta
- Music by: Anurag Saikia
- Production companies: AM Television; Ramdhenu Films; White Flower
- Distributed by: AM Television
- Release date: 2011
- Running time: 85 minutes
- Country: India
- Language: Assamese

Chor: The Bicycle is an assamese language drama film directed by National award-winning filmmaker Khanjan Kishore Nath and produced by Sanjive Narain under his banner AM Television and associated with Ramdhenu films and White Flower.

== Reception ==
Chor: The Bicycle has already been selected for Goa Film Bazaar organized by the International Film Festival of India 2011 and was also invited to the Producer Lab, Cinemart, organised by the International Film Festival of Rotterdam 2012. this is the first film in Assamese language to be invited to the Producer Lab, Rotterdam. Among the 23 projects in Goa Film Bazaar, only 4 projects were invited to the lab and 'The Bicycle' is the first project for that. Besides that, 'Chor' was also invited to Video Library Selection organized by 32nd Guadalajara International Film Festival 2017 in Mexico, the most prestigious film festival in Latin America, and also got the official selection in the Competitive Panorama section at the 10th International Children's Film Festival, Bangladesh 2017.

=== Awards ===
(1) SPECIAL CITATION at 5th Salamindanaw Asian Film Festival, Philippines

(2) BEST CHILDREN FILM, BEST CINEMATOGRAPHY, BEST STORY at 2nd Haryana International Film Festival (India)

(3) BEST FILM, BEST DIRECTOR, BEST ACTOR, BEST CINEMATOGRAPHY, BEST STORY & BEST PRODUCTION DESIGN at International Film Festival of Ahmednagar 2019

(4) BEST DEBUT DIRECTOR, BEST MUSIC, BEST SINGER at Prag Cine Award 2019

(5) BEST DEBUT DIRECTOR, BEST MUSIC, BEST CHILD ACTOR AT State Film Award 2018

=== Festival Selections ===
· 10th International Children Film Festival of Bangladesh 2018 (Bangladesh)

· Indian Film Festival of Melbourne 2018(Australia)

· Salamindanaw Asian Film Festival 2018 (Philippines)

· 1st International Kids Film Festival of India 2018 (India)

· 2nd Haryana International Film Festival 2018 (India)

· Khajuraho International Film Festival 2018

· Invited to Cinekid Screening club section of Cinekid Film Festival 2017, Amsterdam

· Invited to Video Library section of 32rd International Film festival of Guadalajara 2017, Mexico.

· 3rd "Fragrances from the North-East" Film Festival 2018, Pune

· 2nd Guwahati International Film Festival 2018

· 6th Brahmaputra Valley Film Festival 2018

· 1st Nepal Cultural International Film Festival2018

· Itanagar International Film Festival 2019

· International Film Festival of Ahmednagar 2019

· International Children's Film Festival of Kerala 2019

· 5th Smile International Film Festival for Children and Youth 2019

· UP International Film Festival 2020

· 50th Roshd International Film Festival 2021
