= Cobalt Blue (film) =

Indian drama film

- Directed by: Sachin Kundalkar
- Written by: Sachin Kundalkar
- Produced by: Priya Sreedharan; Wasim Khan; Zulfaquar Torabi
- Starring: Prateik Babbar; Neelay Mehendale; Anjali Sivaraman; Neil Bhoopalam; Anant V Joshi; Poornima Indrajith
- Cinematography: Vincenzo Condorelli
- Edited by: Mohit Takalkar
- Music by: Clinton Cerejo
- Production companies: Netflix Studios; Open Air Film
- Distributed by: Netflix
- Release date: 2 April 2022
- Running time: 113 minutes
- Country: India
- Language: Hindi

Cobalt Blue is an Indian Hindi-language drama film written and directed by Sachin Kundalkar starring Prateik Babbar, Dr. Neelay Mehendale, and Anjali Sivaraman. It is adapted from the novel of the same name that follows the story of a brother and sister who fall in love with the same man and the ensuing events that shatter their traditional conservative family. The film was released on 2 April 2022 after some initial delays.

== Plot ==
When an aspiring author, Tanay (Neelay Mehendale), and his free-spirited sister, Anuja (Anjali Sivaraman), fall for the enigmatic paying guest (Prateik Babbar) at their home, the ensuing events rock their traditional Indian family. Set in the 1990s, the movie examines the themes of loneliness, same-sex love, and the free spirit of transcending societal barriers.

== Cast ==
- Prateik Babbar as Paying Guest
- Dr. Neelay Mehendale as Tanay Vidhyadhar Dixit
- Anant V Joshi as Aseem Dixit
- Anjali Sivaraman as Anuja Dixit
- Poornima Indrajith as Sister Mary
- Neil Bhoopalam as Professor (Literature)
- Geetanjali Kulkarni as Sharda Dixit
- Shishir Sharma as Mr. Dixit

== Release ==
In November 2018, it was announced that the novel Cobalt Blue would be adapted into a feature film for Netflix. It was written and directed by Kundalkar. It was originally scheduled for streaming on 3 December 2021 but got postponed and was released on 2 April 2022.

== Reception ==
=== Critic Response ===
Nandini Ramnath from Scroll.in gave a positive review of the film's writing, "Neelay Mehendale's delicate characterisation of Tanay and Prateik Babbar's overt hunkiness create the film's most memorable moments, which have the vividness of primary colours and the erotic flush of first love." Deccan Herald gave the film 3/5 stars and wrote, "The movie has heartwarming Hindi poetry catering to various shades of emotions. The entire movie is a slow, lyrical and heartbreaking journey blended with literature, poetry, music and art. Primary hues have been effectively used to bring out emotions."
