= Sachin Kundalkar =

Indian filmmaker and screenwriter

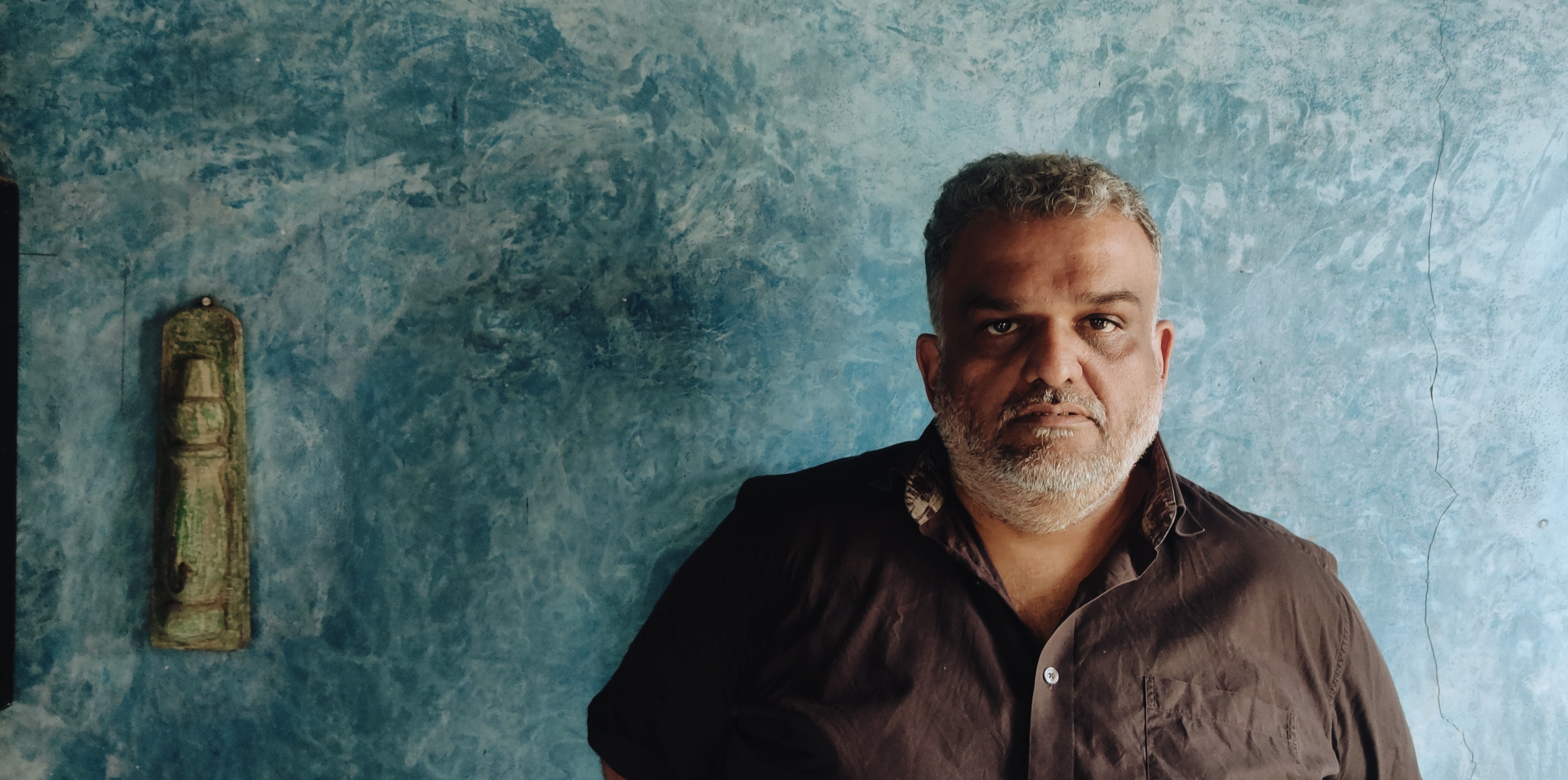
- Kundalkar in 2021
- Occupations: Film director, screenplay writer

Sachin Kundalkar or Sacin Kuṇḍalakar is an Indian film director and screenplay writer who mostly works in Marathi cinema. He is known for his directorial works of Nirop (2007) and Gandha (2009). He has also written for the theatre. He is recipient of two National Film Awards, as a director for Nirop and as a screenwriter for Gandha, the first Marathi film to win Best Screenplay award since the category's institution in 1967.

== Career ==
=== Theatre and other works ===
Kundalkar, who had had an interest in film making since his school days, had approached director Ashutosh Gowarikar for assistance. But the director asked him to come back after finishing his education. While still a student, he assisted Sumitra Bhave and Sunil Sukhthankar in their first film together, Doghi (1995). The film was adjudged as the Best Film on Other Social Issues at the 43rd National Film Awards. He also assisted in other films including Zindagi Zindabad, Bhaais Barabar and Dahavi Fha. After completing his degree in commerce, Kundalkar later on enrolled at the Film and Television Institute of India (FTII). With a scholarship from the French Government, he then attended La Fémis, Paris, and made a short film, One Cafe Please.

Kundalkar directed short films and worked in theatre before entering the mainstream cinema. His first short film, Out of the Box, was made while he was still a student at FTII. His 2005 documentary short film The Bath, starring Rajat Kapoor, is based on an explicit gay theme. The film won 2nd prize in the Short Fiction category presented by the Indian Documentary Producers' Association (IDPA) for "its sensitive depiction of issues of male sexuality" and was also screened at the 30th San Francisco International LGBT Film Festival. Kundalkar has also portrayed homosexual characters in his Marathi plays Chotyasha Suteet (literally meaning In the Short Break) and Poornaviram (literally meaning Fullstop). He went on to write Fridge Madhe Thevlela Prem and Chandralok Complex. All four plays were directed by Mohit Takalkar. These plays have also been staged in Hindi and English. Chotyasha Suteet has been staged as On Vacation for English audiences.

=== Feature films ===
Kundalkar released his first feature film, Restaurant, in 2006. Featuring Sonali Kulkarni in the lead role, the film screened at the 4th Goa Marathi Film Festival, 12th International Film Festival of Kerala, 8th Mumbai Film Festival and was also appreciated in other film festivals. His second directorial film, Nirop, presented the unsurfaced feelings of a musician in his last days in his hometown in Konkan before he moves to France. The film was adjudged as Best Feature Film in Marathi at the 55th National Film Awards for being "an original offbeat film that gives a fresh perspective of the internal landscapes of the human mind." He shared this award with the producer of the film, Aparna Dharmadhikari. The film stars Sameer Dharmadhikari and Devika Daftardar in the lead roles. Kundalkar also wrote the script of this film.

His 2009 film Gandha is a blend of three different stories connected by the common factor of the human sense of smell. The stories were written by Kundalkar and his mother Archana Kundalkar. The film won the Best Screenplay Award at the 56th National Film Awards for "its remarkable integration of three different plots using the sense of smell as a liet motif to focus sensitively on human relationships". Gandha became the first Marathi film to win this award after the category's institution in 1967. The film was screened at the 8th Third Eye Asian Film Festival.

Kundalkar's Bollywood directorial debut, Aiyyaa, starring Rani Mukherjee and Prithviraj in lead roles released in 2012. The film was produced by Anurag Kashyap and Viacom 18.

In 2022, he directed Marathi relationship drama film Pondicherry, which was entirely shot on iPhone with only 15 crew members. Most recently, Kundalkar's 2013 novel Cobalt Blue was adapted into a feature film of the same name. It was released on Netflix in 2022.

== Filmography ==
Films
Year	Film	Language	Notes
2000	Out of the Box	Marathi	Short film
2004	Shubra Kaahi	Marathi	Short film
2005	The Bath	–	Documentary film
2006	Restaurant	Marathi	Writer-Director
2007	Nirop	Marathi	Writer-Director
2009	Gandha	Marathi	Writer-Director
2012	Aiyyaa	Hindi	Writer-Director
2014	Happy Journey	Marathi	Writer-Director
2015	Rajwade and Sons	Marathi	Writer-Director
2016	Vazandar	Marathi	Writer-Director
2017	Gulabjaam	Marathi	Writer-Director
2022	Pondicherry	Marathi	Writer-Director
2022	Cobalt Blue	Hindi	Writer-Director

Plays
Title	Language	Role(s)
Dreams of Taleem	English	Writer
Chotyasha Suteet	Marathi	Writer
Poornaviram	Marathi	Writer
Fridge Madhe Thevlela Prem	Marathi	Writer
Chandralok Complex	Marathi	Writer

== Awards ==
National Film Awards

- 2007 – Best Feature Film in Marathi – Nirop (as Director)
- 2008 – Best Screenplay – Gandha

Maharashtra State Film Awards

- 2025 – Best Director II – Pondicherry

Others

- 2009 – Best Screenplay Award at Pune International Film Festival – Gandha

== Publications ==
At the age of 22, Kundalkar published his first novel, Cobalt Blue. The novel, which he started when he was 20, concerns a brother and a sister from a traditional Marathi family falling in love with the same man. His other publications are:

- Chotyasha Suteet Genre: Play Publisher: Keshav Bhikaji Dhavale
- Fridge Madhe Thevlela Prem: Purnaviram Genre: Play Publisher: Majestic Publications

He has also written articles for the Marathi newspaper Sakal.
