= Atul Kulkarni =

Indian actor

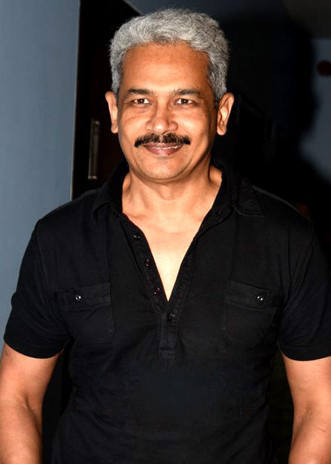
- Atul at the screening of Sonata
- Born: 10 September 1965 (age 61); Belgaum, Karnataka, India
- Education: National School of Drama, New Delhi
- Occupations: Actor; screenwriter; film producer
- Spouse: Geetanjali Kulkarni (m. 1996)
- Website: www.atulkulkarni.com

Atul Kulkarni (born 10 September 1965) is an Indian actor, producer and screenwriter who works in Hindi, Marathi, Kannada, Malayalam, Tamil, Telugu and English language films. Kulkarni won the National Award for the Best Supporting Actor for the films Hey Ram and Chandni Bar. He is also the president of Quest, a research-action organization concentrating on enhancing quality of education. He left his study in engineering at College of Engineering, Pune while he was in his first year. He is known for his performances in films like Hey Ram, Chandni Bar, Rang De Basanti (2006), Natarang (2010) among others. He has also written the screenplay of Laal Singh Chadda, the official remake of Forrest Gump.

== Early life and career ==
Kulkarni received his diploma in acting from the National School of Drama, New Delhi in 1995. He is married to theatre actress Geetanjali Kulkarni (née Geetanjali Moreshwar Sherikar), whom he met at the National School of Drama.

Kulkarni's first stint on stage was during his high school days. He participated in the Maharashtra State Drama Competition regularly. Between 1989 and 1992, he won awards for Acting and also for Drama-Direction. Atul enacted in Gandhi Viruddh Gandhi, the play made later famous by Dilip Prabhavalkar in Marathi professional theatre circuit until mid-90s. Later during his college days he actively participated in cultural gatherings. While studying, Atul joined Natya Aradhana, an amateur theatre group from Solapur. Atul Kulkarni holds a postgraduate diploma in dramatic arts from National School of Drama, New Delhi. Atul Kulkarni, a national-award winner and a fine actor, expresses his belief of art being a product of social, political and economic changes in the society.

== Other works ==
=== Philanthropy ===
Kulkarni has been serving as President of Quest Education Support Trust. Quest Trust invests in running workshops and enabling Teachers, to support education for children of marginalized communities between 3–14 years. All this activity is mainly in State of Maharashtra. It conducts its activities in Marathi language.

Atul Kulkarni has been active in sharing his knowledge on running NGO with other NGO's. He does visit Maharashtra based NGO's like Snehalaya regularly. Kulkarni has been involved in an environmental project, making a 24-acre barren land in Satara District into Green area.

== Filmography ==
=== As actor ===
Year	Film	Role	Language
1997	Bhoomigeetha	Forest officer	Kannada
2000	Kairee	Prof. Jadhav	Marathi
2000	Jayam Manade Raa	Basavayah	Telugu
2000	Hey Ram	Shriram Abhyankar	Hindi; Tamil
2001	Chandni Bar	Potya Sawant	Hindi
2001	Dhyaas Parva	Gopal Krishna Gokhale	Marathi
2002	Run	Bhaskar	Tamil
2002	Bhet	Prabhakar	Marathi
2002	Bibhatsa	Kallu	Hindi
2002	Dahavi Fa	Ganesh Deshmukh	Marathi
2003	Mango Soufflé	Edwin 'Ed' Prakash	English
2003	88 Antop Hill	Pratyush Shelar	Hindi
2003	Satta	Yashwant Varde	Hindi
2003	Dum	'Encounter' Shankar	Hindi
2003	Vastupurush	Nishikant Dada	Marathi
2004	Andhrawala	Bade Mia's sidekick	Telugu
2004	Chanti	MLA Sarvarayudu	Telugu
2004	Gowri	Sarkar	Telugu
2004	Mansarovar	Ravi Roy	Malayalam
2004	Vajram	Unnamed	Malayalam
2004	Khakee	Dr. Iqbal Ansari	Hindi
2004	Devrai	Shesh	Marathi
2004	Manmadhan	ACP Deva	Tamil
2004	Leela Mahal Center	GK	Telugu
2004	Chakwa	Tushar Khot	Marathi
2005	Page 3	Vinayak Mane	Hindi
2006	Kedi	Minister Pughazhenthy	Tamil
2006	Raam	Veerendra	Telugu
2006	Rang De Basanti	Laxman Pandey	Hindi
2006	Corporate	Narrator	Hindi
2006	Maati Maay	Narsu	Marathi
2007	Aa Dinagalu	Agni Shridhar	Kannada
2007	Gauri: The Unborn	Sandeep	Hindi
2008	Valu	Swanand Gaddamwar	Marathi
2008	Talappavu	Krishnadeva Saivar	Malayalam
2008	Kurukshetra	Unnamed	Malayalam
2008	D-17		Malayalam
2009	Yeh Mera India	Raj	Hindi
2009	Delhi 6	Gobar	Hindi
2009	Padikathavan	Kasi Anandan	Tamil
2009	Vandae Maatharam	Atul	Malayalam; Tamil
2009	Jail	Lawyer	Hindi
2010	Yaksha	Machendranath Poonja	Kannada
2010	Sukhaant	Pratap Gunje	Marathi
2010	Natarang	Guna Kagalkar	Marathi
2010	Allah Ke Banday	School Teacher	Hindi
2010	Bumm Bumm Bole	Khogiram Maheshwar Gwala	Hindi
2011	Panjaa	Kulkarni	Telugu
2011	Koffi Bar	Business man	Telugu
2011	Aagaah: The Warning	Aazan Khan	Hindi
2011	Chaalis Chauraasi	Bobby	Hindi
2012	Suzhal	Surya Narayanan	Tamil
2012	Edegarike	Agni Shridhar	Kannada
2013	Nimidangal	Business man	Tamil
2013	Aarambam	JCP Milind Virekar	Tamil
2013	The Attacks of 26/11	Inspector Shinde	Hindi
2013	Popat	Janya	Marathi
2013	Vallinam	Basketball Coach	Tamil
2013	Premachi Goshta	Ram	Marathi
2013	Zanjeer	Jayadev	Hindi
2013	The Lovers	Raoji	English
2014	@Andheri	Rajan Pilla	Malayalam
2014	Ugramm	Dhiraj Shivrudralingaiah	Kannada
2014	Veeram	Aadalarasu	Tamil
2014	Burma	Bothra Seth	Tamil
2014	Happy Journey	Niranjan	Marathi
2015	Abhinetri	Shivaiah	Kannada
2015	Dirty Politics	Police Inspector	Hindi
2015	Mythri	Raviprakash	Kannada; Malayalam
2015	Jazbaa	Lawyer	Hindi
2015	Nellikka	Satheesh	Malayalam
2015	Kanal	Kuruvila Mathew	Malayalam
2015	Rajwade and Sons	Shubhankar Rajwade	Marathi
2016	Pranam		Hindi
2016	Akira	Akira's father	Hindi
2017	Raees	Jairaj	Hindi
2017	The Ghazi Attack	Lieutenant Commander Santosh Devraj	Telugu; Hindi
2017	Bongu	Subash, assistant commissioner	Tamil
2017	Aval; The House Next Door	Paul, Jenny's Father	Tamil; Hindi
2017	Koode	Coach Ashraf	Malayalam
2018	Black Bud	Mehmood Khan	Hindi
2019	Manikarnika: The Queen of Jhansi	Tatya Tope	Hindi
2019	706	Shekhawat	Hindi
2019	Mere Pyare Prime Minister	In PMO	Hindi
2019	Junglee	Keshav Kotian	Hindi
2019	Majili	Anshu's Father	Telugu
2019	Athiran	Dr. Benjamin Diaz	Malayalam
2019	Valiyaperunnal	Shivaji	Malayalam
2019	Alidu Ulidavaru	Police Inspector	Kannada
2020	Wild Dog	DIG Hemanth	Telugu
2021	Koi Jaane Na	Dr. Rao	Hindi
2022	A Thursday	Javed Khan	Hindi
2022	Manasmita	Panchakshari	Kannada
2022	Khudiram Bose	Barindra Kumar Ghosh	Telugu
2022	Anya	Panchakshari	Marathi
2023	Khufiya	Shashank Mehra	Hindi
2025	Ekka	Masthan Bhai	Kannada
2026	Biker	Indraneel Chirag	Telugu
2026	Dacoit: A Love Story	Ishaaq	Telugu; Hindi
2026	Balaramana Dinagalu	Shashidhar	Kannada

=== As screenwriter ===
Year	Film	Language
2022	Laal Singh Chaddha	Hindi

=== Television/web series ===
Year	Series	Role	Notes
2017–18	The Test Case	Colonel Ajinkya Sathe	
2019–2023	City of Dreams	Ameya Rao Gaikwad	
2020	The Raikar Case	Yashwant Naik Raikar	
2020	Bandish Bandits	Digvijay Rathore	
2020	Sandwiched Forever	VK Sarnaik	
2021–present	Faraar - Kab Tak?	Host	
2022	Rudra: The Edge Of Darkness	DCP Gautam Navlakha	
2023	Happy Family: Conditions Apply	Ramesh Mansukhlal Dholakia	

== Awards and nominations ==
Awards	Year	Film	Category	Result	Ref.
National Film Awards	2000	Hey Ram	Best Supporting Actor	Won	
National Film Awards	2003	Chandni Bar	Best Supporting Actor	Won	
Filmfare Awards	2001	Hey Ram	Best Supporting Actor	Nominated	
Asia Pacific Screen Awards	2010	Natarang	Best Performance by an Actor	Nominated	
Filmfare Awards South	2012	Edegarike	Best Supporting Actor – Kannada	Won	
Filmfare OTT Awards	2023	Happy Family: Conditions Apply	Best Actor Male in a Comedy Series	Nominated	

VIFF Vienna Independent Film Festival

- 2019: Won: Best Actor in Murder on the Road to Kathmandu
