= Satish Manwar =

Indian film director and screenwriter (born 2018)

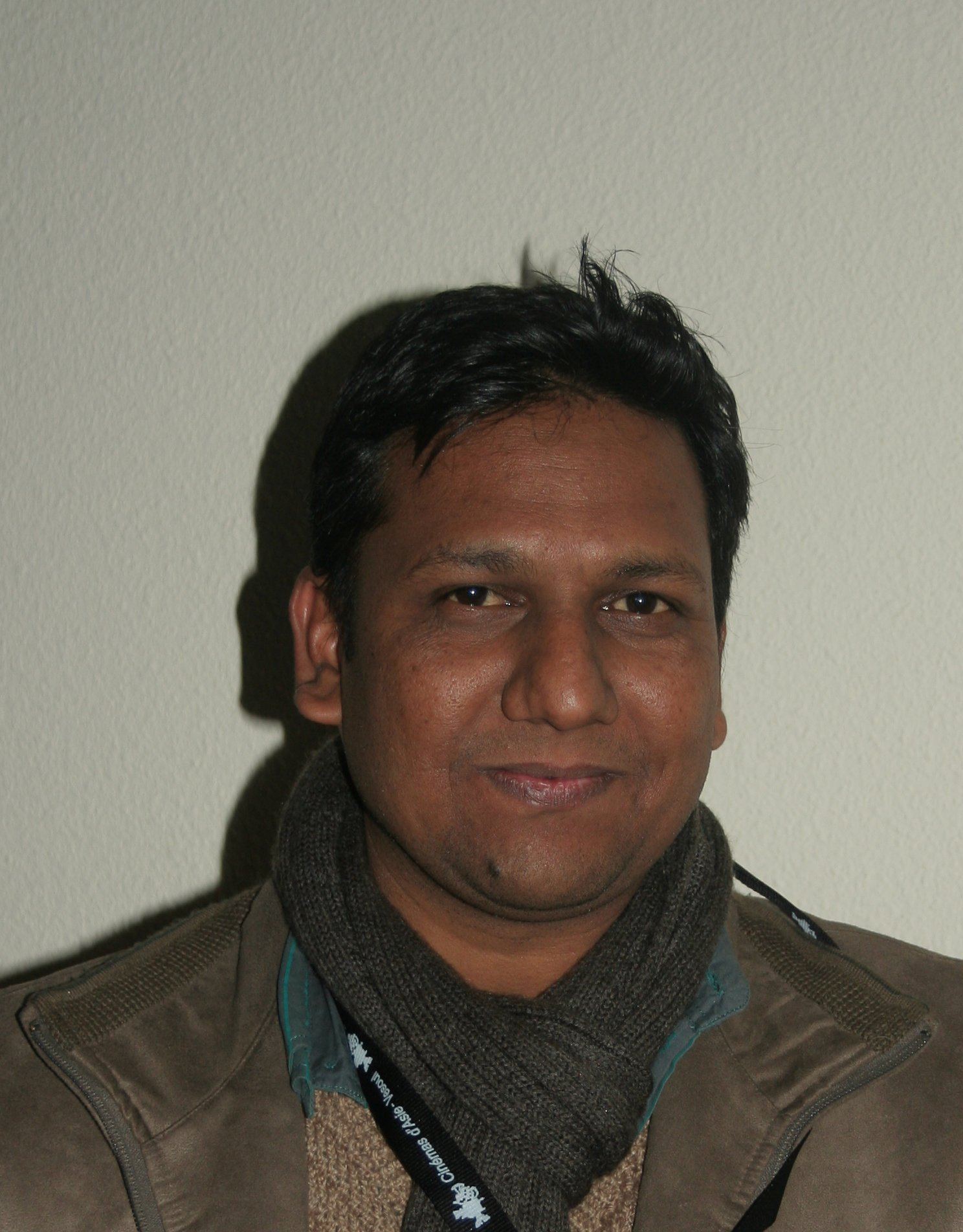
- Satish Manwar at a Film Festival in Vesoul, France (2010)
- Born: 30 September
- Occupation: Film director
- Years active: 1998-present

Satish Manwar is an Indian film director and screenwriter. He grew up in a rural Maharashtra and moved to Pune to learn drama at Center for Performing Arts, commonly known as Lalit Kala Kendra, at Pune University.

== Life and career ==
After receiving his M.A. in 1998, he moved to Mumbai to work as an assistant editor and assistant director. He along with his fellow friends and alumni of Lalit Kala Kendra co-founded a theatre group called Lalit Mumbai.

== Selected filmography ==
Film
Year	Title	Role	Notes
2009	Gabhricha Paus	Director	
2013	Tuhya dharma koncha?	Director	National Film Award for Best Film on Other Social Issues

== Personal life ==
Manwar is married to Marathi playwright and screenwriter, Manaswini Lata Ravindra.
