= Umesh Vinayak Kulkarni =

Indian film director

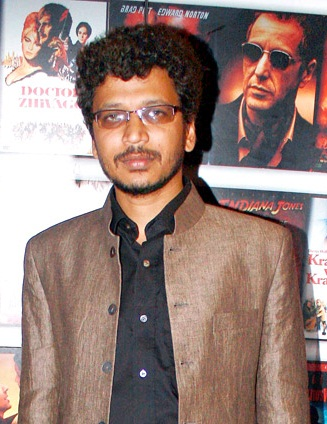
- Born: 6 December 1976 (age 49); Pune, India
- Education: Film and Television Institute of India, Pune
- Occupation: Director
- Years active: 1995
- Parent: Vinayak Kulkarni Vishakha Kulkarni
- Awards: National Film Award for Best debut director

Umesh Vinayak Kulkarni is a Marathi film director. He is an alumnus of the Film and Television Institute of India (FTII), Pune. He is known for Marathi films such as Valu (The Wild Bull), Vihir (The Well), Deool (The Temple) and Highway.

He is known for short films such as Girni (Grinding Machine), Three of Us, Vilay, Gaarud and Darshan.

He received a National Film award for Best Debut Director for his short film Girni.

Deool (The Temple), his feature film, received a National Film Award for best film in the year 2011.

== Early life and career ==
Umesh Kulkarni was born on 6 December 1976 in Pune to Vinayak and Vishakha Kulkarni. He graduated in commerce from BMCC, Pune besides acquiring a law degree. He joined FTII Pune in February 2000.

Kulkarni also directed short films such as Girni, Three of Us, Vilay and Gaarud. Girni won the National Film Award for the Best Non Feature Film.

His first feature film Valu was a significant film for Marathi cinema. It is amongst the few Marathi films that kept the box office collection on an upward swing and also traveled to more than 30 International film festivals, including the Berlin film festival. He then went on to work on features like Vihir and Deool. Vihir was featured in Berlin film festival and Rotterdam International Film Festival 2010, the Netherlands. Deool won the 59th National Film Awards for Best Feature Film, Best Actor (Girish Kulkarni) and Best Dialogue (Girish Kulkarni).

== Filmography ==
- Divine Sight (Short) (2003)
- Girni (Short) (2004)
- Valu (2008)
- Vihir (2009)
- Deool (2011)
- Dhappa (2019) (co-producer)
- Indian Predator: Murder in a Courtroom (2022)
