= Pune International Film Festival =

Annual film festival held in Pune, India

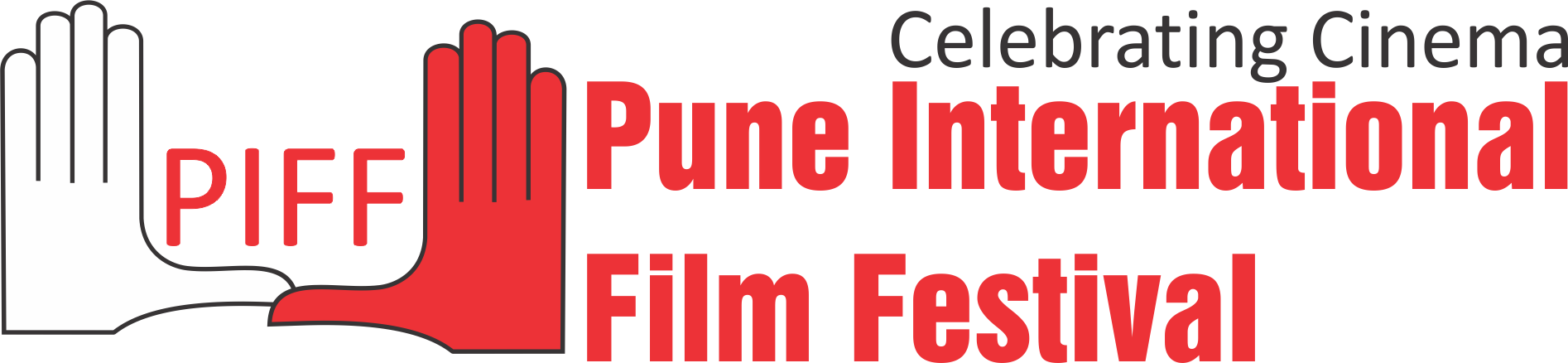
- Location: Pune, India
- Founded: 2002
- Most recent: 2025
- Awards: Prabhat, Sant Tukaram
- Website: www.piffindia.com

The Pune International Film Festival (PIFF) is an annual film festival held in Pune, Maharashtra, India. Open to the general public, screenings take place at venues such as the NFAI, INOX and PVR cinemas across the city. The festival is chaired and directed by Dr Jabbar Patel. The festival's trustees are Jabbar Patel, Satish Alekar, Mohan Agashe, Sabina Sanghvi, Ravi Gupta, Rajendra Kelshikar and Samar Nakhate. The deputy director — Programme and Films is Vishal Shinde, and the deputy director — International Cinema & Relations is Aditi Akkalkotkar.

The festival commences on the second Thursday and concludes on the third Thursday of January. First Edition of PIFF was started in year 2002 and has been running annually except for 2004.

The latest (24th edition) of the PIFF took place from 15th to 22nd January 2026.

== Festival categories ==
- World Competition - Films released in earlier year compete for much-coveted 'Prabhat Best International Film Award'
- Marathi Competition - Marathi films released in earlier year compete for 'Sant Tukaram Best International Marathi Film Award'
- Student Section - Short films from film schools in India like FTII are screened.
- Global Cinema - Non-competition category for cinema around the globe
- Country Focus - A handful of films from one country
- Theme Section - Films relating to the theme of the festival that year
- Retrospective - Retrospective on Indian and Foreign director/actor
- Indian Cinema - Offbeat films produced in India (usually excludes Bollywood and other Indian language mainstream films)
- Tribute Section - Tribute to film personalities passed that year
- Special Screening
- PIFF Workshops - Talks, Seminars, and Workshops on varied subjects by Film Industry persons.
- Student Animation Section - Short animation films for competition by students.This section was for few years.

== Awards ==
- Government of Maharashtra Prabhat Best International Film
- Government of Maharashtra Prabhat Best International Film Director
- Government of Maharashtra Sant Tukaram Best International Marathi Film

== Sant Tukaram Best International Marathi Film Award winners ==
Since 2006, the Government of Maharashtra started awarding the best film in the Marathi competition section at the festival. An international jury watches the competing Marathi films to decide the winner. The award is named after the Marathi film Sant Tukaram, the first Indian entry to be screened at the 5th Venice International Film Festival.

Award-winners
PIFF Edition	Year	Film	Director	Ref.
4	2006	Dombivali Fast	Nishikanth Kamat	
5	2007	Shevri	Gajendra Ahire	
6	2008	Tingya	Mangesh Hadawale	
7	2009	Gabhricha Paus	Satish Manwar	
8	2010	Natarang	Ravi Jadhav	
9	2011	Baboo Band Baaja	Rajesh Pinjani	
10	2012	Ha Bharat Maza	Sumitra Bhave, Sunil Sukhtankar	
11	2013	Kaksparsh	Mahesh Manjrekar	
12	2014	Fandry	Nagraj Manjule	
13	2015	Elizabeth Ekadashi	Paresh Mokashi	
14	2016	Rangaa Patangaa	Prasad Namjoshi	
15	2017	Lathe Joshi	Mangesh Joshi	
16	2018	Pimpal	Gajendra Ahire	
17	2019	Chumbak	Sandeep Modi	
18	2020	Anandi Gopal	Sameer Vidwans	
19	2021	Happy My Son (Porga Majetay)	Makarand Mane	
20	2022	Potra	Shankar Arjunn Dhotre	

== Prabhat International Award Winners ==
The festival started an International Competition section from 2005. The Government of Maharashtra started awarding the best film and the best director in the International Competition. An international jury panel decides the awards. Select awards are listed below.

Edition	Year	Award	Film	Director	Ref.
3	2005	Best Film	Yesterday	Darrell Roodt	
3	2005	Jury Award	Earth and Ashes	Atiq Rahimi	
3	2005	Best Director	Dias de Santiago	Josué Méndez	
4	2006	Best Film	L'Enfant (The Child)	Jean-Pierre & Luc Dardenne	
4	2006	Best Director	L'Enfant (The Child)	Jean-Pierre & Luc Dardenne	
5	2007	Best Film	The Old Barber	Hasi Chaolu	
5	2007	Best Director	The Axe	Costa-Gavras	
6	2008	Best Film	XXY	Lucía Puenzo	
6	2008	Best Director	Sleepwalking Land	Teresa Prata	
7	2009	Best Film	Lake Tahoe	Fernando Eimbcke	
7	2009	Best Director	Tulpan	Sergey Dvortsevoy	
8	2010	Best Film	White Lightnin'	Dominic Murphy	
8	2010	Best Director	Who Is Afraid of the Wolf?	Maria Procházková	
9	2011	Best Film	Dooman River	Zhang Lu	
9	2011	Best Director	Reverse	Borys Lankosz	
10	2012	Best Film	If Not Us, Who?	Andres Veiel	
10	2012	Best Director	A Separation	Asghar Farhadi	
11	2013	Best Film	Barbara	Christian Petzold	
11	2013	Best Director	The Delay	Rodrigo Plá	
12	2014	Best Film	Papusza	Krzysztof Krauze & Joanna Kos-Krauze	
12	2014	Best Director (shared)	Papusza	Krzysztof Krauze & Joanna Kos-Krauze	
12	2014	Best Director (shared)	Foreign Bodies	Mirko Locatelli	
13	2015	Best Film	Behaviour	Ernesto Daranas	
13	2015	Best Director (shared)	Like Never Before	Zdeněk Tyc	
13	2015	Best Director (shared)	Test (Ispytanie)	Alexander Kott	
14	2016	Best Film	Immortal	Seyed Hadi Mohaghegh	
14	2016	Best Director	Thithi	Raam Reddy	
15	2017	Best Film	Lost in Munich	Petr Zelenka	
15	2017	Best Director	The Student	Kirill Serebrennikov	
16	2018	Best Film	Free and Easy	Geng Jun	
16	2018	Best Director	Zama	Lucrecia Martel	
17	2019	Best Film	Girls of the Sun	Eva Husson	
17	2019	Best Director	A Translator	Rodrigo Barriuso & Sebastian Barriuso	
18	2020	Best Film	A Son (Bik Eneich: Un Fils)	Mehdi Barsaoui	
18	2020	Best Director	Supernova	Bartosz Kruhlik	
19	2021	Best Film	Should the Wind Drop (French: Si le vent tombe)	Nora Martirosyan	
19	2021	Best Director	Barah By Barah	Gaurav Madan	
20	2022	Best Film	Between Two Dawns	Selman Nacar	
20	2022	Best Director	107 Mothers	Peter Kerekes	

== PIFF Distinguished Award ==
PIFF Distinguished Award for Outstanding Contribution to Indian Cinema.

Edition	Year	Awardees	References
1	2002	Dilip Kumar	
1	2002	Mrinal Sen	
2	2003	Lata Mangeshkar	
2	2003	Dev Anand	
3	2005	Waheeda Rehman	
3	2005	Shakti Samanta	
4	2006	Vyjayantimala	
4	2006	Yash Chopra	
5	2007	Asha Parekh	
5	2007	Dharmendra	
6	2008	Sharmila Tagore	
6	2008	Shammi Kapoor	
7	2009	Shashi Kapoor	
7	2009	Sulochana Didi	
7	2009	Hema Malini	
8	2010	Shriram Lagoo	
8	2010	Rajesh Khanna	
9	2011	Shashikala	
9	2011	Saira Banu	
10	2012	Amitabh Bachchan	
10	2012	Asha Bhosale	
11	2013	Ramesh Deo	
11	2013	Jeetendra	
12	2014	Adoor Gopalakrishnan	
12	2014	Vinod Khanna	
13	2015	N. D. Mahanor	
13	2015	Shatrughan Sinha	
13	2015	Tanuja Mukerjee	
13	2015	Krzysztof Zanussi	
14	2016	Soumitra Chatterjee	
14	2016	Shyam Benegal	
15	2017	Aparna Sen	
15	2017	Seema Deo	
16	2018	Ramesh Prasad	
16	2018	Ramesh Sippy	
16	2018	Rajdutt	
17	2019	Dilip Prabhavalkar	
17	2019	Govind Nihalani	
18	2020	B. P. Singh	
18	2020	Vikram Gokhale	
19	2021	Ashok Saraf	
23	2025	Anupam Kher	
23	2025	Shubha Khote	

== S.D. Burman PIFF Award ==
Edition	Year	Awardees	References
8	2010	Pyarelal Sharma	
9	2011	Mohammed Zahur Khayyam	
10	2012	Ilaiyaraaja	
11	2013	Shivkumar Sharma	
11	2013	Hariprasad Chaurasia	
12	2014	Hridaynath Mangeshkar	
13	2015	Anandji Virji Shah	
14	2016	Uttam Singh	
15	2021	Zakir Hussain	
16	2017	S. P. Balasubrahmanyam	
17	2018	Raamlaxman	
18	2019	Usha Khanna	
23	2025	Kavita Krishnamurti	

== See also ==
- Marathi cinema
- Cinema of India
- Film festival
