= Girish Kulkarni =

Indian actor, writer and producer (b. 1977)

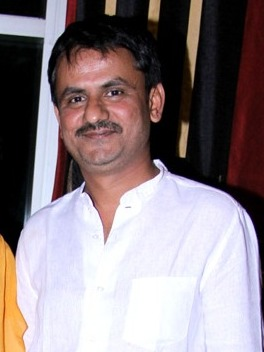
- Kulkarni in 2012
- Born: 25 November 1977 (age 48); Nannaj, Solapur district, Maharashtra, India
- Occupations: Actor; Writer; Producer; Director
- Known for: Dangal
- Parent: Lata Kulkarni (Mother)
- Awards: National Film Award for Best Actor (2011); National Film Award for Best Screenplay (2011)

Girish Pandurang Kulkarni (born 25 November 1977) is an Indian actor, writer, and producer. He is a recipient of two National Film Awards namely, National Film Award for Best Actor in 2011 for his performance in Deool and National Film Award for Best Screenplay for the same film. He is well known for Marathi films such as Valu, Vihir, Deool, Gabhricha Paus and Jaundya Na Balasaheb. He is known to Hindi audiences for his role in the Aamir Khan starrer Dangal and Anurag Kashyap's movie Ugly. He received acclaim for his portrayal of gangster 'Appa' in the 2017 Marathi crime thriller Faster Fene opposite Amey Wagh. He also starred in India's first Netflix original series Sacred Games as the Maharashtra home minister Bipin Bhosale character.

== Personal life ==
Kulkarni was born on 25 November 1977 in the Paranda Taluka of Osmanabad district and grew up in Pune. He pursued his Diploma in Mechanical Engineering from Puranmal Lahoti Government Polytechnic Latur. He was involved in local stage plays. After Post Graduation, he worked for private IT companies for a while but soon enough he decided to pursue a career in writing. Kulkarni then joined the Marathi film industry.

== Career ==
Kulkarni began his career as a Cluster Programming Head for Radio Mirchi.

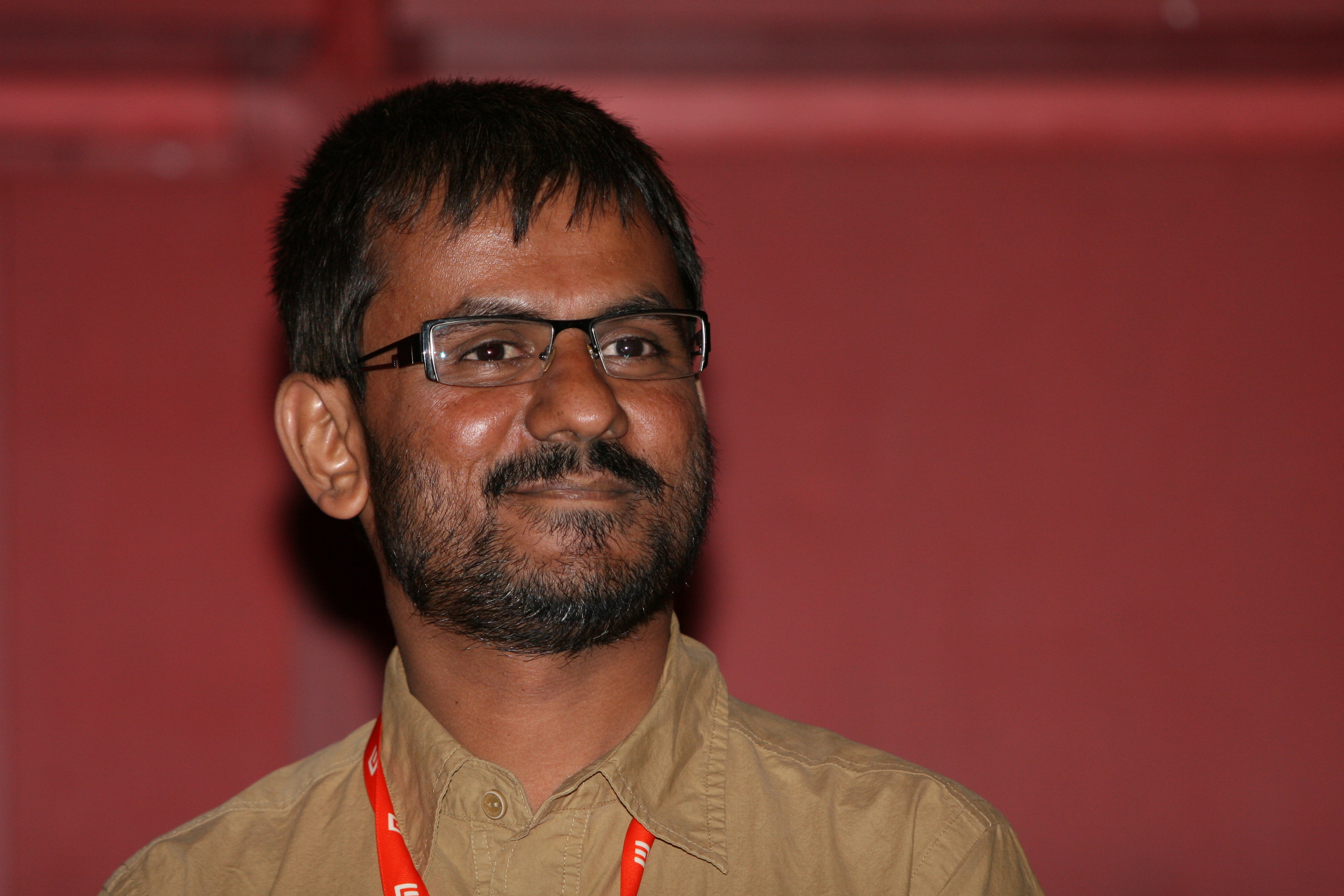
Kulkarni presents Valu in Karlovy Vary International Film Festival in 2008

Valu, released in 2008, was a light, enjoyable movie portraying various stereotypical characters found in an Indian village through the simple story of a wild bull which needs to be captured. Inspired by his observations, and many of the characters he writes reflect authentic village people.

In 2009's Gabhricha Paus, he portrayed the tragic story of an Indian farmer from a small village in Vidarbha, who is suffering because of sparse rain, evil money lenders and the negligence of the Indian government towards farmers. His second release in 2009, Vihir, was an abstract movie which told the story of an adolescent boy who sets out to understand the meaning of life and death after his cousin and close friend dies. Vihir was screened at Berlin International Film Festival in 2010 and garnered praise and critical appreciation from all over the world.

His following movie Deool, released in 2011, which depicted how politicians manipulate the beliefs of innocent masses in the name of God. The film earned him two National Film Awards, for best actor and for best screenplay.

His next writing and acting venture in Marathi cinema, the movie Masala released in 2012 quickly became a family favourite, unveiling new aspects of his talents. In 2013, he made his acting debut in Bollywood with film-maker Anurag Kashyap's thriller Ugly, in which his performance as the inadvertently funny cop brought him the attention and praise of the industry as well as the masses.

Currently, work on his upcoming films is underway. His next is a Marathi movie titled Highway, starring Huma Qureshi and Tisca Chopra, which he has written, acted in, and co-produced. He is also working on a comedy film, with which he will mark his directorial debut, apart from acting in it.

He has acted as the National coach for Geeta Phogat in the acclaimed movie Dangal (film). The character had shades of grey and is shown to have issues with on-screen Mahavir Phogat. This was his biggest role in Bollywood, with Dangal earning over $300 million to become the 5th highest grossing non-English film of all time. He was also seen in Kaabil as Inspector Nalawade. Later in 2017, Kulkarni portrayed local gangster Appa in Faster Fene, based on the popular book series written by Bhaskar Ramachandra Bhagwat.

In 2018, Kulkarni portrayed politician Bipin Bhonsle in the Netflix original Sacred Games, based on the 2006 thriller by Vikram Chandra of the same name. With a star studded cast, including Saif Ali Khan, Nawazuddin Siddiqui, and Radhika Apte, Sacred Games has been lauded by critics as one of the best web series to come out of India.

== Filmography ==
=== Films ===
Year	Title	Role	Language	Notes
2006	Badha	Bevda	Marathi	
2008	Valu	Jeevan	Marathi	
2009	Gabhricha Paus	Kisna	Marathi	
2009	Gandha	Mangesh	Marathi	
2009	Vihir	Bhavasha Mama	Marathi	
2011	Deool	Keshya	Marathi	
2012	Masala	Revan Patil	Marathi	
2013	Pune 52	Amar Aapte	Marathi	
2013	Postcard	Postman	Marathi	
2014	Ugly	Vijay Jadhav	Hindi	
2015	Highway	Shekhar	Marathi	
2016	Jaundya Na Balasaheb	Balasaheb	Marathi	
2016	Dangal	Wrestling Coach Pramod Kadam	Hindi	
2017	Kaabil	Inspector Nalawade	Hindi	
2017	Faster Fene	Appa	Marathi	
2018	Fanney Khan	Karan Kakkad	Hindi	
2018	Boyz 2	Madan Bondwe	Marathi	
2019	Firebrand	Madhav Patkar	Marathi	
2019	Dithee	Govinda	Marathi	
2021	Hello Charlie	Priyesh Patel	Hindi	
2022	Bhirkit	Tatya	Marathi	
2023	Thankam	Inspector Jayant Sakhalkar	Malayalam	
2023	Jailer	Bal Singh	Tamil	
2023	Ganapath	Senior	Hindi	
2023	Boyz 4	Madan Bondwe	Marathi	
2023	Ekda Yeun Tar Bagha	Shravan Dada	Marathi	
2024	Gaarud	RK	Marathi	
2025	Deva	Jairaj Apte	Hindi	
2025	Interrogation	Rajan	Hindi	

=== Web series ===
Year	Title	Role	Language	Platform	Notes
2018	Sacred Games	Bipin Bhosle	Hindi	Netflix	
2020	Bhaag Beanie Bhaag	Vasant Bhatnagar	Hindi	Netflix	
2021	Sunflower	S.I. Chetan Tambe	Hindi	ZEE5	
2022	Guilty Minds	Bhandari	Hindi	Amazon Prime Video	
2026	Matka King	TP D'souza	Hindi	Amazon Prime Video	

Writing and production credits
Year	Film	Notes
2008	Valu	Story, screenplay, Dialogues and producer
2009	Vihir	Story, screenplay, Dialogues
2011	Deool	Story, screenplay, Dialogues
2012	Masala	Story, screenplay, Dialogues
2016	Jaundya Na Balasaheb	Story, screenplay, Dialogues, Direction
2018	Dhappa	Writer, Co-producer

== Awards ==
- 2011 Deool - National Film Award for Best Actor
- 2011 Deool - National Film Award for Best Screenplay (Best Dialogue)
- Zee Chitra Gaurav Puraskar for Best Supporting Actor for film Valu.
- Filmfare Award for Best Supporting Actor – Marathi for film Faster Fene.
- 2017 Jaundyana Balasaheb - Zee Chitra Gaurav 2017
- 2024 Filmfare OTT Awards Nominated-Best Supporting Actor -Sunflower (web series) Season 2
