= Abigail Savage =

American actress

- Born: June 26, 1977 (age 49); New York City, US
- Education: Williams College (theatre major, 1998)
- Occupations: Actress, sound engineer
- Years active: 2000–present
- Known for: Acting, sound editing
- Notable work: Orange Is the New Black
- Spouse: Caitlin McElroy
- Relatives: Louise Glück (aunt)

Abigail Savage (born June 26, 1977) is an American actress and sound editor. She played inmate Gina Murphy on Netflix's Orange Is the New Black, as well as roles in Brian De Palma's Redacted (2007), Lee Daniels's Precious (2009), and on Law & Order SVU. As of July 2015, she had twelve acting credits, and seventy-five sound credits including Half Nelson (2006), Inside Job (2010), Mike Birbiglia's Sleepwalk with Me (2012), Supermensch: The Legend of Shep Gordon (2013), as well as all of Ramin Bahrani's feature films.

== Early life and education ==
Abigail Savage was born in New York City to Tereze Glück, vice president of Citibank for her entire career of over thirty years, and also a fiction writer. Glück bought a home in 2015 in Cherry Grove, a hamlet on Fire Island, where Savage would stay during her breaks. Glück's sister is Nobel laureate poet Louise Glück. Her grandmother, Beatrice Glück went to Wellesley College in Massachusetts in a time when it was uncommon for women to attend college, and majored in French.

Her father is an audiophile and started her interests in sound technology. She would go to his apartment when she was twelve and he would show off his system and classical records, including the turntable for vinyl records. He was always upgrading his system.

Savage was a theatre major and graduated from Williams College, a liberal arts college in Massachusetts, in 1998.

== Career ==
When Savage graduated from Williams College, the head of the drama department advised, "Be patient!", it's the same advice Savage gave to other aspiring women in the acting industry. Savage has had several New York City theater roles: Dido, Queen of Carthage at The Ohio Theatre (2001); Demon Baby at The Ohio Theater (2002); Silence at The Ohio Theater (2002); Seven in One Blow or The Brave Little Kid at the Aladdin Theatre for the Performing Arts (2004); Hospital 2005 at the Aladdin Theatre for the Performing Arts (2005); and a mathematical savant in The Five Hysterical Girls Theorem at The Connelly Theater (2000).

Savage is a sound designer, and sound editor. She got interested in the sound editing industry to support her between acting jobs, and fell in love with the work. Her roommate in the summer after college complained of having too many internships, one for a post production sound studio. She did sound for the senior production at college so took the position. She says that her sound designer work complements her acting as it teaches the importance of consistency in takes, and handling the props the same way each time. One of the companies she works for is Dig It Audio a "boutique audio mix and post production house in New York City for film, gaming and television".

According to The Hollywood Reporter, "Savage's unique Hollywood resume also includes a long list of sound editing credits ...includ[ing] the 2010 financial documentary Inside Job (for which she shared a Motion Picture Sound Editors nomination)". As of July 2015, she has seventy-five sound credits. Her credits include: Game 6 (2005), Man Push Cart (2005), Half Nelson (2006), The Last Winter (2006), Joshua (2007), Where God Left His Shoes (2007), Sugar (2008), Chop Shop (2008), Goodbye Solo (2008), Plastic Bag (2009), Inside Job (2010), The Tillman Story (2010), The Greater Good (2011), The Kite (2011), At Any Price (2012), Dear Mandela (2012), Sleepwalk With Me (2012), Supermensch: The Legend of Shep Gordon (2013), Ivory Tower (2014), Mississippi Grind (2015), (Dis)Honesty: The Truth About Lies (2015), Complete Unknown (2016), First Monday in May (2016), Don't Think Twice (2016), and Thank You for Playing (2015).

Savage joined the cast of Jenji Kohan's Netflix series Orange Is the New Black in 2013 as "kitchen-bound" inmate Gina Murphy at a minimum-security women's prison. She said of the role that she had worked for years "to get anywhere, somewhere, before Orange fell into her lap." She originally auditioned for the role of Nicky Nichols but that went to Natasha Lyonne; but the producers found the Gina role for her. The series is based on Piper Kerman's memoir, Orange Is the New Black: My Year in a Women's Prison (2010), about her experiences at FCI Danbury, a minimum-security federal prison. In the fifth season, the show had a prison riot and it was ended by a correctional emergency response team (CERT) who "dragged inmates outside and loaded them onto buses", her character surrendered with a handful of other inmates. Her character was transferred from Litchfield to FDC Cleveland in Ohio along with a number of other inmates. In 2017 the cast won the Screen Actors Guild (SAG) Award for Outstanding Performance by an Ensemble in a Comedy Series; they had previously won for season's two and three. In 2018 the cast was nominated for the SAG Award for Outstanding Performance By An Ensemble In A Comedy Series.

== Personal life ==
Savage is Jewish. Savage is married to Caitlin McElroy, with whom she has a daughter. They eloped and married in a tuxedo shop in Bennington, Vermont, before same-sex marriages became legal in their home state of New York in 2011. (Note: Same-sex marriage in Vermont has been legal since September 1, 2009.) The shop owner was the presiding justice of the peace.

She is the niece of Nobel laureate poet Louise Glück.

== Acting filmography ==
- Law and Order: Special Victims Unit (2003) as Dot.
- Redacted (2007) as Tattooed Kid.
- The Return of Jezebel James (2008) as Minnie (2 episodes).
- Precious (2009) as Bunny.
- Law and Order: Special Victims Unit (2009) as The Master Baiter
- Jim (2010) as human clone #3774.
- Orange is the New Black (2013-2017, 2019) as Gina Murphy.
- Time Out of Mind (2014) as Sabrina.
- Law and Order: Special Victims Unit (2016) as Sister Nina.
- What We Do in the Shadows (2020) as Tonya.
- The Spine of Night (2021) as Kestrelwren (voice).

== Awards and nominations ==
- 2011, Motion Picture Sound Editors, Golden Reel Award [Nominee] for Best Sound Editing - Sound Effects, Foley, Dialogue, ADR and Music in a Feature Documentary for Inside Job (2010)
- 2015–2018, won three Screen Actors Guild Awards for being in the cast of Orange Is the New Black, and was nominated again in 2018.
