= Weifang World Kite Museum =

Museum in Weifang, Shandong, China

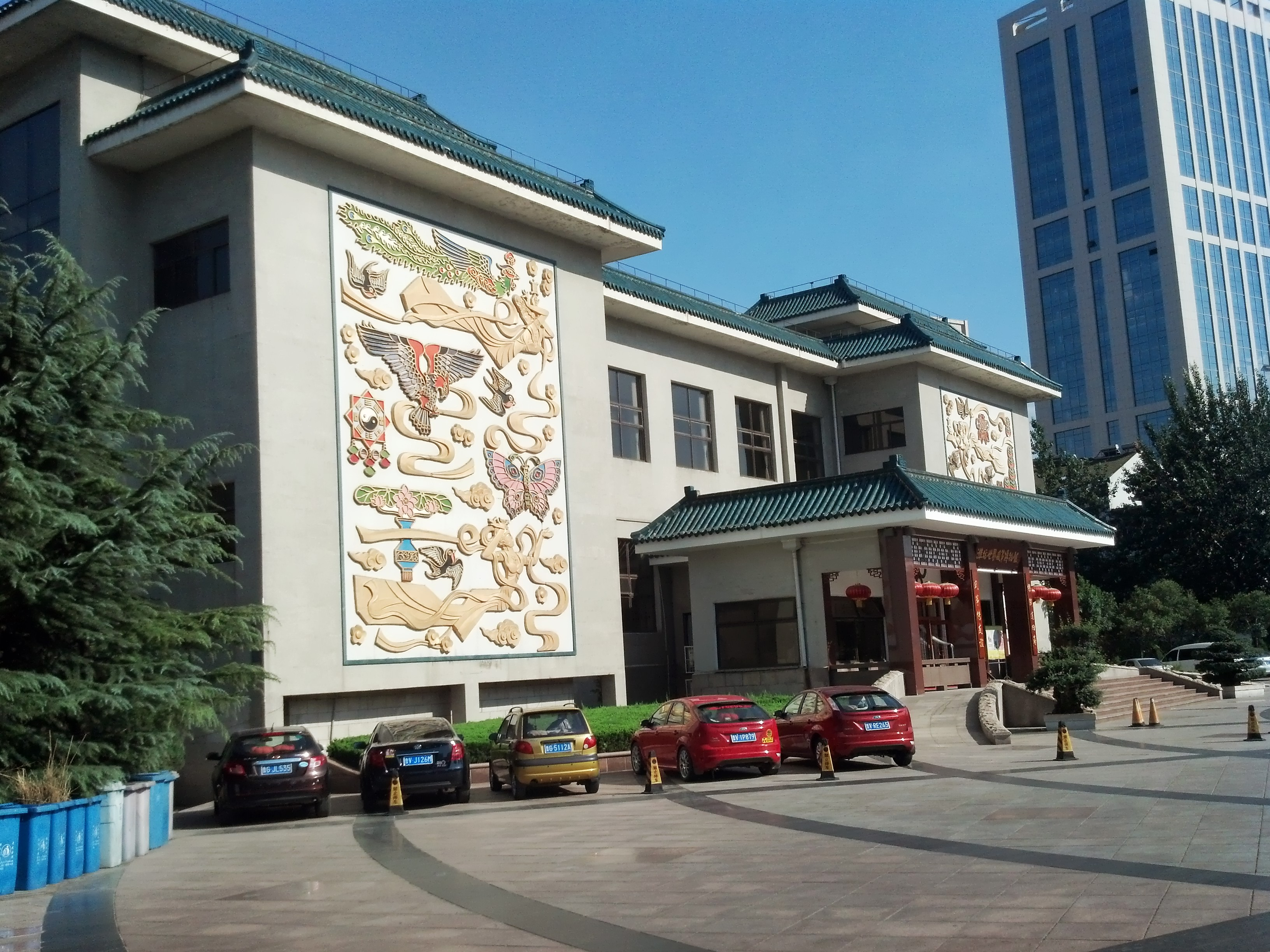
- Established: 1989
- Location: 66 Xingzheng Street, Weifang, Shandong, China
- Coordinates: 36.70379°N 119.11502°E

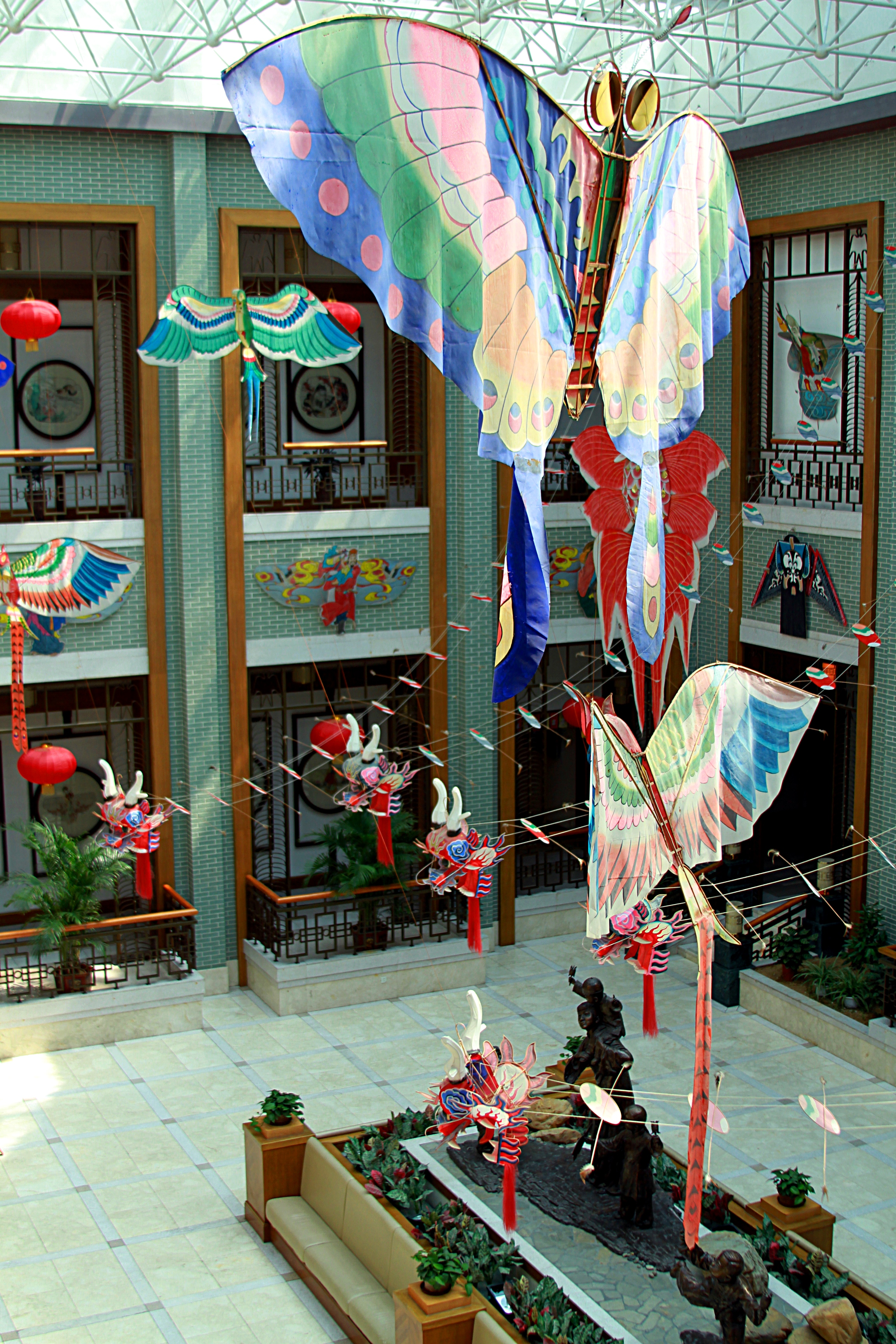
Entrance hall of the Kite Museum

Weifang World Kite Museum (Chinese: 潍坊世界风筝博物馆) is a museum in the Kuiwen District of Weifang, China. First opened in 1989, it has twelve galleries with models and kites from China's ancient past to modern times and kites from around the world.

Weifang is renowned as the "World Capital of Kites".

== History ==
On July 1, 1987, the construction of Weifang World Kite Museum officially started.

On April 1, 1989, Weifang Kite Museum was officially completed and opened to the public.

In 2002, Weifang World Kite Museum invested 5 million yuan to build a new circular screen movie.

In November 2003, Weifang World Kite Museum was placed under the management of Weifang Tourism Bureau.

In April 2011, the Weifang Municipal Government invested in the renovation and planning of the Weifang World Kite Museum.

On January 27, 2024, the unveiling ceremony of the XR digital experience space of the Weifang World Kite Museum was held.

== Building pattern ==
=== Overview ===
Weifang World Kite Museum includes 7 exhibition halls and 1 projection hall, including "History and Culture of Kite Exhibition", "Weifang Kite Exhibition", "World Kite Exhibition", etc., with a total construction area of 8,100 square meters. The first, second, third and fourth exhibition halls and the multi-functional hall are on the first floor, and the fifth and sixth exhibition halls and projection hall are on the second floor.

=== Multifunctional Hall ===
The multifunctional hall of Weifang World Kite Museum was built in 2011. The hall is divided into a multimedia display area, with giant screen projection (detailed introduction to the historical origin, evolution and development of kites and Weifang International Kite Festival, etc.), holographic projection (using virtual imaging projection technology, 10-meter-long imaging area, to truly reproduce the lively scenes in the old Weixian street market), touch computer games, etc.

=== Folk Craft Experience Hall ===
The Folk Craft Experience Hall is an exhibition hall where Weifang International Kite Museum invites professional artists to demonstrate Weifang's local folk craft art (kites, New Year paintings, paper-cuts, etc.) on site, and is equipped with indoor windless kite flying performances. Visitors can appreciate the charm of art in this hall and complete their favorite kite works by hand under the guidance of artists.

== Building style ==
The architectural style of Weifang World Kite Museum is based on the shape of Weifang dragon head centipede kite. The roof is a complete composite ceramic dragon and the roof is paved with peacock orchid glazed tiles, like a dragon flying in the sky, rising and falling.

== Honors ==
In January 2020, Weifang World Kite Museum was selected as one of the "Six Good" scenic spots in Shandong Province.

In October 2021, it was selected into the list of 100 "Hospitable Shandong Internet Celebrity Check-in Spots".

== Functional value ==
The exhibition of Weifang World Kite Museum vividly displays the history, application and evolution of kites with a large number of real objects, photos and materials; introduces the schools, types and characteristics of kites, the schools and classifications of Weifang kites and the relevant contents of previous Weifang International Kite Festivals, etc.and fully and detailedly explains the historical and cultural connotations and modern significance of kites. The exquisite Weifang kites collected and displayed are unique in terms of material selection, color, and art. The main content is coordinated with the kite shape, and the atmosphere of life and local characteristics are integrated, which fully reflects the unique folk style of "Weifang kites" with exquisite craftsmanship, richness and generosity.
