= Hum Tum Shabana =

- Theatrical release poster
- Directed by: Sagar Ballary
- Screenplay by: Farhajaan Sheikh
- Story by: Farhajaan Sheikh
- Produced by: Sunil Chainani; Sameer Chand Srivastava; Subhash Dawar
- Starring: Tusshar Kapoor; Shreyas Talpade; Minissha Lamba
- Cinematography: Anirudh Garbyal
- Edited by: Suresh Pai
- Music by: Sachin–Jigar
- Production companies: Horseshoe Pictures; Alliance Entertainment
- Distributed by: Watchtower Pictures
- Release date: 30 September 2011
- Running time: 126 minutes
- Country: India
- Language: Hindi

Hum Tum Shabana (transl. Me and you, Shabana) is a 2011 Indian Hindi-language romantic comedy film directed by Sagar Ballary. It stars Tusshar Kapoor, Shreyas Talpade and Minissha Lamba.

== Plot ==
Hum Tum Shabana revolves around three characters. The two men compete to woo the woman, but then it turns into a desperate battle to lose her.

== Cast ==
- Tusshar Kapoor as Rishi Malhotra
- Shreyas Talpade as Karthik Iyer
- Minissha Lamba as Shabana Raza
- Sanjay Mishra as Munna Military (Manoj Tyagi)
- Mantra as Nandu
- Satish Kaushik as Chacha Panju
- Pia Trivedi as Rhea Dixit
- Rahul Singh as Ravi Aggarwal
- Rajesh Khattar as Vikram Malhotra
- Pooja Batra as Puja (Cameo appearance)
- Surveen Chawla as Shabana (Cameo appearance)
- Madhur Bhandarkar as himself (Cameo appearance)
- Karmveer Choudhary as Gangster
- Vaarssh Bhatnagar as Bittu
- Vikas Shrivastav as Don 1

== Soundtrack ==
The music of the film was composed by music director duo Sachin–Jigar.

Hum Tum Shabana

Soundtrack album by Sachin–Jigar
- Released: 2011
- Recorded: 2011
- Genre: Film soundtrack
- Label: T-Series

Sachin–Jigar chronology
Shor in the City (2011)	Hum Tum Shabana (2011)	Tere Naal Love Ho Gaya (2012)

1. "Musik Bandh Na Karo" - Abhishek Nailwal, Palash Sen, Anushka Manchanda
2. "Hey Na Na Shabana" - Raghav Mathur
3. "Thank U Mr DJ" - Mika Singh, Suzanna D'Mello
4. "Piya Kesariyo" - Anushka Manchanda, Jigar Saraiya
5. "Kaari Kaari" - Vijay Prakash, Shalini Singh, Tochi Raina - Lyrics: Mayur Puri
6. "Hey Na Na Shabana" (Party Map Remix) Remix - DJ Akhil Talreja
7. "Musik Bandh Na Karo" (Remix) Remix - Kiran Kamath

== Reception ==
=== Critical response ===
Hum Tum Shabana received negative reviews all throughout. Preeti Arora of Rediff.com said, "... an unashamed attempt to ape the Golmaal series, Hum Tum Shabana is a rudderless ship which simultaneously endeavors to straddle many genres. And fails miserably," and gave it half a star out of 5 stars. The Indian Express rated it half a star as well. Taran Adarsh of Bollywood Hungama giving it 1.5 out of 5 stars, said that it has a funny first half but a disappointing second hour. Nupur Barua of fullhyd.com lamented the fact that Sagar Ballary, the director, "seems to prefer the Golmaal and Dhamaal styles, rather than that of his first film Bheja Fry." fullhyd.com rated the movie 4/10. The Times Of India's Nikhat Kazmi wasn't positive about the film either, and rated it 2/5.
