= Prem Akkaraju =

American business executive

- Education: Columbia University
- Employer: Stability AI
- Notable work: The White Tiger
- Title: CEO Stability AI
- Board member of: Wētā FX, The Screening Room
- Spouse: Mary Ann
- Children: 2

Prem Kumar Akkaraju is an American business executive who has served as the CEO of Stability AI since 2024. He was formerly the CEO of Weta Digital from 2020 to 2022.

== Executive producer ==
Akkaraju was an executive producer of the 2021 Oscar-nominated feature film The White Tiger. The film is based on the 2008 Man Booker Award-winning book of the same title. Other executive producers of the film include Priyanka Chopra, Ava DuVernay, Ramin Bahrani and Mukul Deora. The White Tiger released on Netflix worldwide on January 22, 2021.

== Career ==
In June 2020, Akkaraju announced Weta Digital will produce original content under a newly-formed entity called Weta Animated. Peter Jackson and Fran Walsh will be developing and directing original animated content for the venture.

Akkaraju and Sean Parker co-founded The Screening Room. The Screening Room, a proposed movie delivery service, includes shareholders Steven Spielberg, Ron Howard, J.J. Abrams, Martin Scorsese and Peter Jackson. Akkaraju also served as the CEO of The Screening Room and now serves as executive chairman.

Akkaraju was included in Variety's inaugural Silicon Valleywood Impact Report, in which he was described as a "technology maven". He is an inventor of 26 technology patents in secure-content delivery.

== Personal life ==
Akkaraju has an MBA from Columbia Business school and lives in Los Angeles with his wife Mary Ann and two children.
