= Claudia Puig =

American journalist

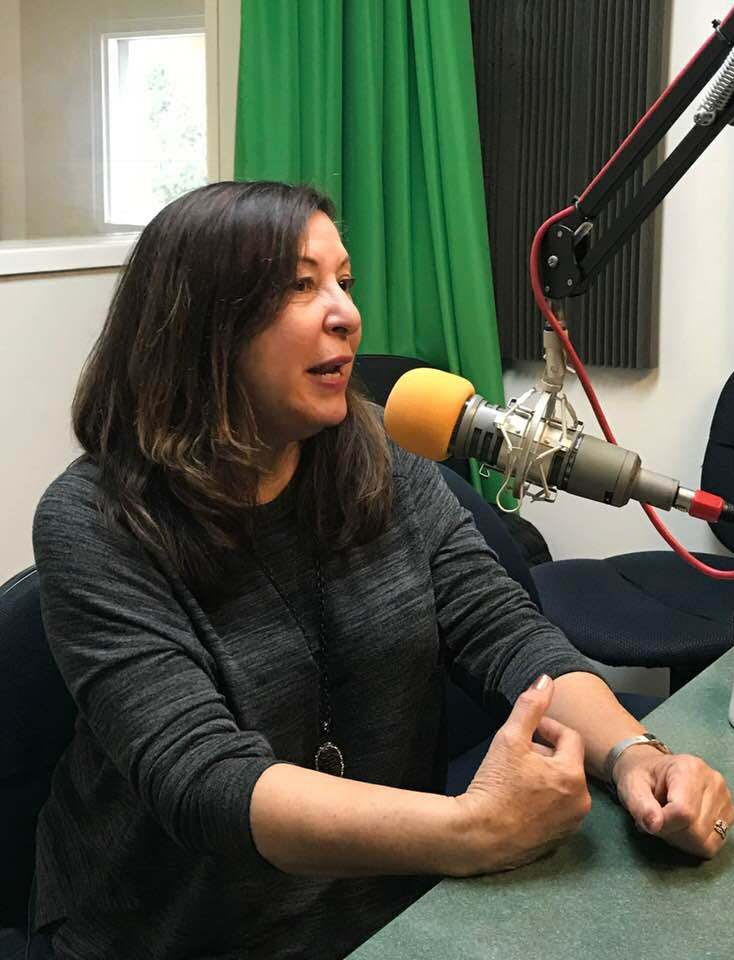
- Claudia Puig at a Santa Barbara radio station, November 2019
- Born: September 10, 1956 (age 69); California, U.S.
- Education: University of California, Los Angeles (BA); University of Southern California (MA)
- Occupation: Film critic
- Years active: 1986–present

Claudia Puig (born September 10, 1956) is an American entertainment journalist and film critic. She was on staff at USA Today as lead film critic and prior to that was a staff writer at the Los Angeles Times. She is currently a critic for NPR's Film Week, and president of the Los Angeles Film Critics Association (LAFCA).

== Early life ==
A native Spanish speaker, Claudia is first generation American, her parents having been born in Mexico. She grew up in California and went to Catholic school, then to study abroad at both Cambridge University and Universidad Iberoamericana in Mexico City. She has a B.A. in Communications Studies from UCLA and an M.A. in Communications from University of Southern California.

== Career ==
Claudia began her journalism career in 1986 at the Los Angeles Times, where she was a staff writer for 11 years covering local news. In 1997 she became an entertainment reporter at USA Today, then promoted to film critic in 2001 and, chief film critic in 2005. While there, Puig also hosted USA Today's video series The Screening Room.

In 2015, Claudia announced she was leaving the USA Today saying that she was "excited to embark on new adventures," and thanked her readers for following her work. In 2015, Claudia started working as program director at various film festivals, including Napa Valley Film Festival, Mendocino Film Festival, FilmFest919 in Chapel Hill and most recently AFI Film Festival as Senior Programmer.

Claudia teaches a college class on Diversity in the Media and has served as a speechwriter and diversity consultant for the Academy of Motion Picture Arts and Sciences.

Puig is currently a movie critic for NPR's Film Week and a contributor to NPR Morning Edition and All Things Considered. She is also a contributor for The Wrap, and AARP magazine, and frequently appears as guest moderator for entertainment industry panels and Q&As across the country.

In 2020, Claudia was featured in a Los Angeles Times article as one of 14 critics making media more inclusive and in Indiewire as one of 20 Latin-Americans making a difference in independent film.

In 2023, the Santa Barbara International Film Festival announced Claudia Puig as its programming director.

== Awards and honors ==
Puig was presented in 2020 with the Excellence in Entertainment Journalism by The National Association of Latino Independent Producers (NALIP) and in 2017, she was the recipient of the Roger Ebert Award from the African American Critics Association.

== Personal life ==
As of 2015, Puig was living with her fiancé. As of 2019, she was living in Glendale, California.
