= Plastic Bag (disambiguation) =

A plastic bag is a bag made of thin plastic.

Plastic Bag may also refer to:

- Plastic Bag (film)
- "Plastic Bag", song by X-Ray Spex from Germ Free Adolescents
