= Ishq Bector =

Canadian musician

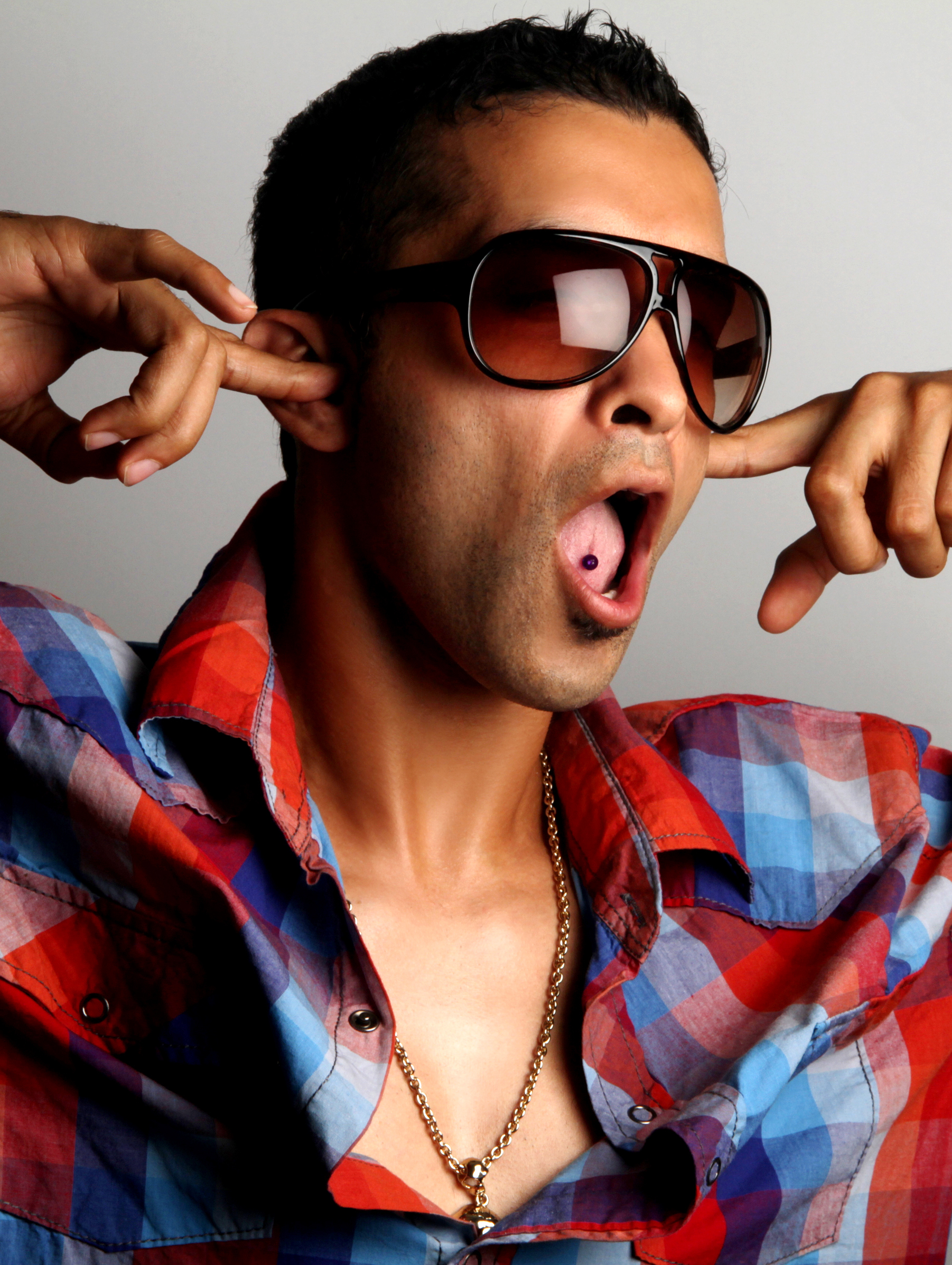
- Born: Winnipeg, Manitoba, Canada
- Occupations: Singer; rapper; producer
- Website: www.ishqbector.com

Ishq Bector is an Indo Canadian hip hop singer and producer. He is best known for his song "Aye Hip-Hopper", a collaboration with Sunidhi Chauhan. He also composed and performed on the song "Har Gham Mein Khushi Hai" from the Bollywood film Gully Boy. He has released four full-length albums, and participated in corporate campaigns by Amazon, Netflix, Flipkart and McDowells. He has featured in Bollywood music videos including "Karle Gunna - Ugly Aur Pagli", and "Harry's not a Bramachari - Shaadi ke side effects".

== Early life and education ==
IshQ was born and raised in Winnipeg, Manitoba, to a family of Punjabi descent. He attended a French immersion school. As a teenager, he was part of an underground Canadian hip hop group called Frek Sho.

ishQ studied acting at the Roshan Taneja film studio and Madhumathi's Academy in Mumbai.

== Music career ==
IshQ's breakthrough album was Dakku Daddy, led by the first single "Aye Hip Hopper". He has produced, written, and performed music for films including Shaadi Ke Side Effects, Besharam, Pyaar Ke Side Effects, Dhoom 2, Fight Club – Members Only, Race, Mission Istanbul, Hello, Ugly Aur Pagli and Allah Ke Banday. He has also composed music for the TV series Travel India and Culture Shock. He has performed with international artists such as Sean Paul, Rishi Rich, John Cena.

His singles include the hits "Aye Hip Hopper", "Daaku Daddy", "Ishq De", "Miss You", "Bum Bum Bo!", "Dirty ishQ", and "Chaand Sitare". His single "Saali Bitch" was released online due to censorship regulations.

Ishq is managed by Qyuki Digital Media, the digital management company owned by A. R. Rahman, Shekhar Kapur and Samir Bangara. He works closely with the “After School of Hip-Hop”, a school in Mumbai’s Dharavi slums which provides underprivileged children with an opportunity to develop their musical talent.

== Television career ==
IshQ has hosted shows on Channel V, MTV India, and B4U. He was also a participant in the reality TV show Iss Jungle Se Mujhe Bachao, the Indian version of I'm a Celebrity...Get Me Out of Here!. He also starred in the TV series Bollywood Hero, in the role of Girish.

== Discography ==
=== As a playback singer ===
Year	Movie	Song	Music director	Note(s)
2005	Barsaat	Nakhre	Nadeem Shravan	
2006	Kathputli	Mitra Nu	Daboo Malik	
2008	Maan Gaye Mughal-e-Azam	Maan Gaye Mughal-E-Azam	Anu Malik	
2008	Money Hai Toh Honey Hai	Awaara Dil	Nitin Arora & Sony Chandy	
2008	Mission Istaanbul	Nobody Like You	Chirantan Bhatt	
2008	Hello	Hello	Sajid–Wajid	
2008	Ugly Aur Pagli	Karle Gunaah	Anu Malik	
2008	God Tussi Great Ho	Chalti Kya	Sajid–Wajid	
2010	Allah Ke Banday	Kaala Jaadu	ishQ Bector	
2010	Krantiveer: The Revolution	Chhote Tera Birthday Aaya	Sachin–Jigar	
2011	Kaccha Limboo	Like This	ishQ Bector	
2011	Always Kabhi Kabhi	School Ke Din	Pritam Chakraborty	
2011	Happy Husbands	Aai Aai Aai Hai	Anay	
2011	Bheja Fry 2	Ishq Da Keeda	Ishq Bector	
2012	Filmistaan	Le Udaari	Arijit Datta	
2013	Yeh Jawaani Hai Deewani	Dilliwali Girlfriend	Pritam	
2013	Besharam	Besharam	Lalit Pandit	
2013	Besharam	Besharam (remix)	Lalit Pandit	
2013	Love Yoou Soniye	Go Moti	ishQ Bector	
2013	Ugly	Ugly	ishQ Bector	
2013	Race 2	Race Sanson Ki	Pritam	
2013	Satya 2	Control	ishQ Bector	
2014	Shaadi Ke Side Effects	Harry's Not a Brahmachari	Pritam	
2015	Time Pass 2	Madan Pichkari	Chinar-Mahesh	
2019	Gully Boy	Har Gham Mein Khushi Hai	ishQ Bector	
2019	House of ishQ	All Songs	ishQ Bector	

=== As music director ===
Year	Movie	Note(s)
2005	ishQ De	Album
2006	Katputtli	Mitran Nu
2008	Dakku Daddy	Album
2010	Jhagde	Album
2010	Allah Ke Banday	Kaala Jaadu
2011	Kaccha Limboo	Like This
2011	Bheja Fry 2	3 Songs
2011	Saali Bitch	Album
2013	Besharam	Title Song
2013	Love Yoou Soniye	All Songs
2017	Fukrey Returns	Raina
2019	Gully Boy	Har Gham Mein Khushi Hai
2019	377, Abh Tho Normal	
2019	House of ishQ	All Songs

=== As lyricist ===
Year	Movie	Song
2006	Kathputli	Mitra Nu
2008	Mission Istaanbul	Nobody Like You
2008	Dakku Daddy	Album
2010	Jhagde	Album
2011	Saali Bitch	Album
2019	House of ishQ	Album
