= Prashant Shah =

Indian film producer

- Born: India
- Occupations: Actor; Producer

Prashant Shah is a film producer based in Las Vegas, Los Angeles and the UK. He is the CEO and founder of Bollywood Hollywood Production Inc., a film and television production company that produces and shoots Bollywood movies in the UK, India, Canada, United States and South America. His latest films as a Producer titled Jungle Cry.

== Career ==
Prashant Shah (PS) first worked in a variety of industries including global marketing and business development in electronics. With education in computer science PS had IT consulting business related to biometric and security software applications. His experiences include F&B, healthcare staffing solutions.

In June 2013, Shah joined Benaroya Pictures as VP and head of physical production. By 2018, he left Benaroya Pictures and launched Bollywood Hollywood Production, a media company that does the acquisition, development and production of feature films in both the Hindi and English language.

=== Producer ===
PS has more than 30 feature films & TV shows including "My Name is Khan, "Padman", "ZERO", "Roadies" and new releasing home production feature film "Jungle Cry" to his credits.

== Selected filmography ==
Shah's films include:

- Love at Time Square (line producer) (2002)
- It Was Raining That Night (Producer) (2003)
- Out of Control (line producer) (2004)
- Morning Raga (Distributor all media North America & UK)
- Jaan-E-Mann (line producer) (2005)
- Indian Fish in American Waters (Distributor 2005)
- Yun Hota Toh Kya Hota (line producer) (2006)
- Ta Ra Rum Pum (line producer: USA) (actor) (2007)
- Karma, Confessions and Holi (consulting producer) (2009)
- Apne (consulting producer) (2007)
- Guru (grateful acknowledgment) (2007)
- Love Story 2050 (line producer) (2008)
- Dostana (line producer) (2008)
- Mummyji (US Distributor) (2009)
- Kambakkht Ishq (line producer) (2009)
- Kurbaan (line producer USA) (2009)
- Kites (line producer) (2010)
- My Name Is Khan (line producer) (2010)
- Ra.One (2010) (executive producer)
- Ek Main Aur Ekk Tu (2011) (Line Producer -USA)
- Chak Dhoom Dhoom Dance show for Television for COLORS channel and Endemol India (Executive Producer USA) (2010)
- MMFM - Miami Media Film Market (Co-Producer with CAMACOL and State of Florida) (2011)
- Birth of a Nation - Indira Gandhi (Executive Producer) (2012)
- MTV Roadies (Executive Producer) (2012)
- Yeh Jawani Hai Diwani (Line Producer - Argentina) (2012)
- Cymbeline (Executive Producer) (2013)
- CELL (Executive Producer) (2014)
- Bang Bang! (Line Producer - USA) (2014)
- Arranged Marriage (Producer) (2015)
- Brothers (Consulting Producer) (2015)
- Half Girlfriend (Executive Producer) (2016)
- A Gentleman (2016 film) (Actor) (Executive Producer) (2016)
- Super Fight League (MMA Sports)|Super Fight League (MMA Sports) (2017)
- Pad Man (Executive Producer-USA) (2018)
- Speed Kills (Actor - played role of King Hussein of Jordan-2017)
- Zero (Executive Producer-USA) (2018)
- Jungle Cry (Producer) (2020)
- Tribe S1 (TV Series for amazon as Supervising Producer) (2023)
