= Sagar Ballary =

Indian film director

- Born: 1975 (age 50–51); Mumbai
- Occupations: Film director, writer, screenwriter
- Known for: Bheja Fry; Bheja Fry 2

Sagar Ballary (born in 1975) is an Indian film director, most known for his films, like Bheja Fry (2007), Bheja Fry 2 (2011) and Bhatukli (Marathi) (2014).

== Early life and career ==
Born in Mumbai, India in 1975, Ballary was raised in the Mumbai suburb of Matunga and went to St. Joseph's High school, Wadala. He obtained a degree in English literature from Ruia College, Mumbai before traveling to Kolkata to pursue a diploma in Direction & Screenplay Writing from the Satyajit Ray Film and Television Institute (1997–2001). He scripted and directed a 34 min diploma film "Kalu Ravi," a Bengali film in his final year at SRFTI which was selected for the national competition at the Mumbai International Film Festival (MIFF 2003).

== Career ==
In 2002, Ballary, after completing his diploma, returned to Mumbai and worked as the Chief Assistant Director on the feature "Raghu Romeo" (Dir: Rajat Kapoor). Then he began the development of the script of a feature film "Ding Dong – Baby Sing a Song" which later was retitled "Bheja Fry." From 2005 to 2007, Ballary worked with Rajat Kapoor in the capacity of an Associate Director for the films "Mixed Doubles" and "Mithya" between which he made his own feature film, "Bheja Fry."

He is also the Executive Producer & Director of a feature film, titled as "Kaccha Limboo" for the Sahara One Motion Pictures banner. The film released in February 2011. Soon after, his next film "Bheja Fry 2" released in June 2011.

His next film "Hum Tum Shabana" for Horseshoe Pictures with Shreyas Talpade, Tusshar Kapoor and Minnisha Lamba in lead released in September 2011.

Sagar has also produced Marathi film "Bhatukli" directed by Rohit Joshi. The film which is a family drama features actors Ajinkya Deo and Shilpa Tulaskar in the lead.

== Filmography ==
Year	Film	Language	Notes
2007	Bheja Fry	Hindi	
2011	Kaccha Limboo	Hindi	
2011	Bheja Fry 2	Hindi	
2011	Hum Tum Shabana	Hindi	
2019	Jungle Cry	Hindi	
2020	PariWar	Hindi	
