= Yahaan =

2005 Indian film by Shoojit Sircar

- Theatrical release poster
- Directed by: Shoojit Sircar
- Written by: Piyush Mishra (dialogues)
- Screenplay by: Piyush Mishra; Somnath De; Shoojit Sircar; Sameer Kohli
- Story by: Sabapati; Mahesh
- Produced by: Garry Grewal; Shoojit Sircar; Robby Grewal
- Starring: Jimmy Sheirgill; Minissha Lamba; Yashpal Sharma; Mukesh Tiwari
- Cinematography: Jakob Ihre
- Edited by: Chandrashekhar Prajapati
- Music by: Songs: Shantanu Moitra; Nizami Bandhu; Background Score: Sameer Uddin; Abhishek Arora
- Production companies: Sahara One Motion Pictures; Red Ice Films
- Release date: 29 July 2005
- Country: India
- Language: Hindi
- Budget: ₹3.5 crore

Yahaan (English: Here) is a 2005 Indian Hindi-language romantic war thriller film directed by Shoojit Sircar and produced by Sahara One Motion Pictures and Red Ice Films. The film stars Jimmy Sheirgill, Minissha Lamba (in her film debut) and Yashpal Sharma in lead roles and had its theatrical release on 29 July 2005. Yahaan was also screened at the 7th Ocean's Cinefan Film Festival where it was awarded with the Special Jury Prize.

== Plot ==
Kashmir is in turmoil due to terrorist activity and the Indian army's attempts to locate and eliminate those responsible. When army commander Aman is posted to Kashmir to combat insurgents, he meets Adaa. She lives with her father, grandmother, and mute adopted sister. Her brother, Shakeel, has joined the terrorists. Aman and Adaa soon find themselves falling in love. However, Aman does not inform the army about his new relationship. His task is to find and eliminate the terrorists, and he captures their leader, who is Shakeel's mentor. Adaa's family learns about her relationship with Aman. While her grandmother approves, her father asks Aman to stay away, saying that their relationship will not be accepted.

Disappointed, Aman is given another mission. Acting on a tip-off, he and his men raid a terrorist hideout, only to be attacked by the terrorists themselves. Many insurgents are killed, and Aman and four of his comrades are captured by Shakeel. He demands the release of his leader in exchange for the soldiers. Shakeel demands the release of his leader in exchange for the soldiers. Meanwhile, Adaa finds her brother's hideout and begs him not to hurt Aman. Seizing the opportunity, Aman breaks free and escapes with Adaa just as the army besieges the hideout and rescues the captured soldiers.

The army has now discovered that Aman and Adaa are having an affair. There are suspicions that Aman is collaborating with terrorists, as he is not at their hideout and has fled with Adaa. He is arrested as soon as he arrives in the city and is court-martialed. Adaa does everything she can to help him. She goes to see the chief minister, who agrees to help her on the condition that she publicly denies any relationship with Aman, as this could damage the army's reputation. Adaa refuses. Instead, acting on the advice of her mute sister, she writes a letter to the prime minister telling him her story and asking for help for Aman. Fortunately, a TV channel invites her to give a live interview and share her story with the world. When this news spreads, the terrorists become angry. They instruct Shakeel to stop it. He takes over a mosque and takes people hostage, demanding the release of their leader in exchange for their freedom. They also bomb Adaa's house on their leader's orders, seriously injuring her grandmother in the process. Despite this, Adaa decides to go ahead with the interview. Shakeel demands that the government negotiate with Aman, who was in a relationship with his sister.

In the end, Aman enters the mosque alone and confronts Shakeel. Shakeel beats him up, but then realises that his father is one of the hostages inside. Meanwhile, Adaa tells her story live on TV. Everyone listens to the heart-wrenching tale of the two lovers and her plea for Shakeel to return. Aman informs Shakeel that the terrorist leader has bombed his house and that his grandmother is in hospital. The terrorists then decide to leave, taking a man and a few hostages with them. As soon as they step outside, Aman, who is wearing a bulletproof jacket, shoots the terrorist leader. He falls, giving the sniper a chance to aim at the others. The army invades, forcing the remaining terrorists to surrender. In the end, Adaa arrives and they leave together.

== Cast ==
- Jimmy Sheirgill as Captain Aman
- Minissha Lamba as Adaa
- Yashpal Sharma as Shakeel Ahmed
- Banwari Taneja as Alsami, Terrorist Head
- Mukesh Tiwari as Major Rathod
- Saurabh Dubey as Army Commander
- Dolly Ahluwalia as Adaa's grandmother
- Gyan Prakash as Adaa's father
- Nimrat Kaur as Journalist
- Harish Khanna as Majid
- Gajraj Rao as Home Minister
- Neeraj Sood

== Music ==
Yahaan

Soundtrack album by Shantanu Moitra and Nizami Bandhu
- Released: 24 June 2005
- Recorded: 2005
- Genre: Feature film soundtrack
- Length: 36:24
- Language: Hindi
- Label: Times Music

The soundtrack album of Yahaan consists of 5 songs, 2 remixes and a theme track. Shantanu Moitra and Nizami Bandhu composed the songs, which were written by Gulzar and Nizami Bandhu, while the remixes and theme track were done by Sameeruddin and Abhishek Arora, who have also composed the background score of the film. The soundtrack album was launched on 24 June 2005 on Times Music while on digital platforms the album was made available on 9 August 2005. Aakash Gandhi of Planet Bollywood praised the soundtrack and gave it a rating of 8.5 out of 10 in his music review.

No.	Title	Lyrics	Music	Performer(s)	Length
1.	"Naam Adaa Likhna"	Gulzar	Shantanu Moitra	Shaan; Shreya Ghoshal	6:21
2.	"Urzu Urzu Durkut"	Gulzar	Shantanu Moitra	Shreya Ghoshal	4:13
3.	"Mele Chaliyan"	Gulzar	Shantanu Moitra	Shreya Ghoshal	5:19
4.	"Ajmer Wale Khwaja"	Nizami Bandhu	Nizami Bandhu	Nizami Bandhu	3:59
5.	"Kahoon Kaise Sakhi"	Nizami Bandhu	Nizami Bandhu	Nizami Bandhu	5:55
6.	"Mele Chaliyan" (remix)	Gulzar	Shantanu Moitra; Sameeruddin; Abhishek Arora	Shreya Ghoshal	3:31
7.	"Naam Adaa Likhna" (remix)	Gulzar	Shantanu Moitra; Sameeruddin; Abhishek Arora	Shaan; Shreya Ghoshal	5:25
8.	"Yahaan Theme"			Tara	1:41
Total length:					36:24

== Release and reception ==
Yahaan was released along with director Kabir Kaushik's Sehar on 29 July 2005. However, due to heavy rains in Mumbai on 26 July 2005, both films performed poorly at box office. Critics praised the film for being warm and intimate.

=== Critical response ===
Anupama Chopra of India Today praised the acting performance of Jimmy Shergill and the direction of Shoojit Sircar but criticized the slow pacing of the film and its climax which she felt was unconvincing. Raja Sen of Rediff appreciated the realistic nature of the film along with the acting performances of all actors but was critical of the film's "oversimplified" conclusion. Taran Adarsh of Bollywood Hungama praised the performances of Jimmy Shergill and debutant Minissha Lamba but felt that the film suffers from a weak screenplay and slow pacing. Taran gave the film a rating of 1.5 out of 5.

== Accolades ==
- Star Screen Award for Best Lyrics (Won) - "Naam Adaa Likhna" (Gulzar)
- Star Screen Award for Best Film - Robby Grewal
- Star Screen Award for Best Director - Shoojit Sircar
- Star Screen Award for Best Actress - Minnisha Lamba
- Star Screen Award for Playback Singer Male - "Naam Adaa Likhna" (Shaan)
- Star Screen Award for Playback Singer Female - "Naam Adaa Likhna" (Shreya Ghoshal)
- Screen Award for Best Lyricist - "Naam Adaa Likhna" (Gulzar)
