= Anamika (2008 film) =

2008 Indian film

- Theatrical poster
- Directed by: Anant Mahadevan
- Written by: Anant Mahadevan
- Based on: Rebecca by Daphne du Maurier
- Produced by: Bhanwar Lal Sharma
- Starring: Dino Morea; Minissha Lamba; Gulshan Grover; Koena Mitra
- Music by: Anu Malik
- Release date: 2 May 2008
- Country: India
- Language: Hindi

Anamika (translation: Nameless) is an Indian Hindi-language psychological thriller film starring Dino Morea, Minissha Lamba, Gulshan Grover and Koena Mitra. It is written and directed by Anant Mahadevan and produced by Bhanwar Lal Sharma. The film is based on Daphne du Maurier's 1938 novel, Rebecca. (Note: Attributed to multiple references:)

== Plot summary ==
Vikram Aditya Singh Sisodiya, a rich industrialist from Rajasthan, comes to Mumbai for a business meeting and requests the services of an escort who will actually be his secretary for the day. Jia Rao, employed by the escort service, makes a hash of her job, which prompts Vikram to train her to be a good escort. Before the day ends, he proposes marriage to her, and she accepts.

She moves into his palatial bungalow, where she is introduced to the caretaker Malini and the support staff, who do nothing but refer to the dead Mrs. Anamika Sisodiya. Everything in the mansion has her stamp "A," and Jia is trapped until she musters enough courage to say that she is Mrs. Sisodiya. Both try to save their marriage by burying the ghost of the past, and by a twist of fate, they are led to the body of Anamika. After the dead body is revealed, Vikram gets arrested as he is accused of murdering Anamika. Then it is revealed that Malini, their caretaker was secretly in love with Vikram and planned this. She led Vikram to believe that Anamika had an affair with her cousin Sanjay. Malini allured Sanjay, and they both portrayed Anamika as a characterless woman. Vikram, enraged by Anamika's "unfaithfulness," has a furious row with her, and she storms off in anger. Malini follows her in another Jeep on the pretence of saving Anamika from the desert storm. She later calls Vikram, saying that the Jeep Anamika took was stuck in a storm and that Anamika was missing. In reality, Malini attacked Anamika, and she died due to blunt force trauma on the head. Malini attacks Jia and reveals what she made of Anamika and is about to do the same to her. As Vikram realises it, he goes to save Jia, who is about to die in the fire set by Malini. In the end, Malini burns herself alive, while Vikram and Jia are finally free from trouble.

== Cast ==
- Dino Morea as Vikram Aditya Singh Sisodiya
- Minissha Lamba as Jia Rao
- Gulshan Grover as Shekhar Rajput
- Koena Mitra as Malini
- Achint Kaur as Vishakha Rajput
- Jatin Grewal as Sanjay

== Soundtrack ==
The soundtrack was composed by Anu Malik and lyrics were written by Sameer. The complete album was released on 1 October 2007.

=== Track listings ===
#	Title	Singer(s)	Length
1	"Aashiqui"	Shaan	2:01
2	"Aayo Reory	Sunidhi Chauhan	2:17
3	"Laagee Lagan"	Krishna & Sunidhi Chauhan	1:36
4	"Saath"	Anu Malik & Sunidhi Chauhan	2:03
5	"Shagufta Dil"	Shaan	1:48
6	"Saath (Remix)"	Anu Malik & Sunidhi Chauhan	1:46
7	"Aayo Re (Remix)"	Sunidhi Chauhan	2:26
8	"Shagufta Dil (Remix)"	Shaan	1:27

== Reception ==
Taran Adarsh of Bollywood Hungama gave the film 1.5 out of 5, writing, "On the whole, ANAMIKA is letdown by its writing in the second hour." Khalid Mohamed of Hindustan Times wrote, "Ananth Narayan Mahadevan’s Anamika, treats Alfred Hitchcock's Rebecca (1940) as if it were chewing gum. Chomp, chomp, chomp till it’s tasteless and tiresome. Surely Hitch would have gone burp re burp." Sukanya Verma of Rediff.com gave the film 1 out of 5, writing, "Instead of simply reproducing the existent material in all its glory, the makers introduce lousy elements and single-handedly demolish the very core that made the original so mind-blowing in the first place."
