= Mr. Bhatti on Chutti =

- Theatrical release poster
- Directed by: Karan Razdan
- Written by: Faseeh Ullah
- Produced by: Ashwani Chopra
- Starring: Anupam Kher; Bhairavi Goswami; Shakti Kapoor
- Cinematography: Aatish Parmar
- Music by: Channi Singh
- Distributed by: Tulips Film Lts.
- Release date: 18 May 2012
- Country: India
- Language: Hindi

Mr. Bhatti on Chutti (transl. Mr. Bhatti on Holiday) is a Hindi comedy film that was released on 18 May 2012. It stars Anupam Kher as Mr. Bhatti, Bhairavi Goswami as Katy, Shakti Kapoor as a tourist and Pakistani actor Abid Ali as Inspector Javed Khan. The film was directed by Karan Razdan and distributed under the banner of Tulips Film Ltd.

== Cast ==
- Anupam Kher as Mr. Bhatti
- Emma Kearney as Alice
- Bhairavi Goswami as Katy
- Shakti Kapoor as A Tourist
- Aman Irees as Mr. Bose
- Pawan Shankar as Prem
- Abid Ali as Inspector Javed Khan
- Neha Pendse
- Amitabh Bachchan as himself
