= Bheja Fry 2 =

- Theatrical release poster
- Directed by: Sagar Ballary
- Screenplay by: Sharat Katariya; Sagar Ballary
- Story by: Sagar Ballary
- Produced by: Mukul Deora
- Starring: Vinay Pathak; Kay Kay Menon; Rukhsaar Rehman; Minisha Lamba; Suresh Menon; Amol Gupte; Kishwer Merchant
- Cinematography: Parixit Warrier
- Edited by: Suresh Pai
- Music by: Songs: Ishq Bector; Sneha Khanwalkar; Sagar Desai; Background Score: Sagar Desai
- Production company: Reliance MediaWorks Ltd
- Distributed by: Watchtower Pictures
- Release date: 17 June 2011
- Running time: 130 Minutes
- Country: India
- Language: Hindi

Bheja Fry 2 (transl. Brain fry 2) is an Indian comedy film released on 17 June 2011. It is the sequel to the 2007 film Bheja Fry.

== Plot ==
Ajit Talwar (Kay Kay Menon) is a business tycoon. The movie starts with an interview with Ajit Talwar on a news channel. Ajit Talwar has a broad business unit. Ajit Talwar is married to Naina Talwar (Rukshar), but still, Ajit Talwar is a womanizer who has an affair with his secretary, played by Spanta Patel (Kishwer Merchant). Ajit Talwar has a friend Kapoor (Rahul Vohra), whose wife Raveena (Aditi Govitrikar) runs a TV channel. Kapoor invites Ajit to the final episode of Aao Guess Karein, a TV reality show aired on Kapoor's TV channel. The finalist of the show is the protagonist, Bharat Bhushan (Vinay Pathak), who wins ₹ 25 lakh and a chance to journey on a luxurious cruise. The Executive Producer of the show Ranjini (Minissha Lamba) asks Bharat Bhushan how he would like to utilise the prize money. Bhushan responds that he would produce a music album.

Bhushan is an income tax officer and has a friend, M. T. Shekharan (Suresh Menon), who is also an income tax officer. Shekharan calls on Bhushan for an income tax raid. But Bhushan refuses, saying that he is leaving for a holiday on a luxurious cruise. Shekharan follows Ajit Talwar to the cruise ship and employs various disguises to collect evidence on Ajit Talwar. Ajit and Bhushan get lost on an island. Bhushan makes his way to the cruise with all preparations, and thus the hilarious journey begins.

== Cast ==
- Vinay Pathak as Bharat Bhushan
- Kay Kay Menon as Ajit Talwar
- Minissha Lamba as Ranjini
- Amol Gupte as Raghu Burman
- Suresh Menon as M. T. Shekharan
- Virendra Saxena as Viru Chacha
- Aditi Govitrikar as Raveena Kapoor
- Rahul Vohra as Kapoor
- Rukhsar Rehman as Naina Talwar
- Kishwer Merchant as Spanta Patel
- Amit Behl as Raviraj
- Rahul Singh as Dharam Bharti

== Sequel ==
Sagar Ballary, director of Bheja Fry series said in 2018 that he has some ideas for the third part. Ballary stated - "We have an idea and some concept. We would like to make it definitely, we want to do it but as I am working on other films right now so 'Bheja Fry' is not going to happen immediately".

== Soundtrack ==
The music of the film was composed by Ishq Bector, Sneha Khanwalkar and Sagar Desai. Lyrics were penned by Shree D., Sonny Ravan and Shakeel Mohammed.

=== Track listing ===
No.	Title	Lyrics	Music	Singer(s)	Length
1.	"Banjaare"	Shellee	Sagar Desai	Rekha Rao	3:19
2.	"Burra Na Maano Ji"	Shree D., Sonny Ravan	Ishq Bector	Shree D., Dolly Peters	3:51
3.	"Ishq Da Keeda"	Shree D., Sonny Ravan	Ishq Bector	Shree D., Ishq Bector	3:52
4.	"O Rahi"	Shakeel Mohammed	Sneha Khanwalkar	Vinay Pathak	4:40
5.	"We Go Crazy"	Shree D., Sonny Ravan	Ishq Bector	Shree D., Apeksha Dandekar	3:38
6.	"We Go Crazy" (Remix)	Shree D., Sonny Ravan	DJ HMD	DJ HMD, Shree D., Apeksha Dandekar	3:45
