= Bhairavi Goswami =

Indian actress, model, and television host

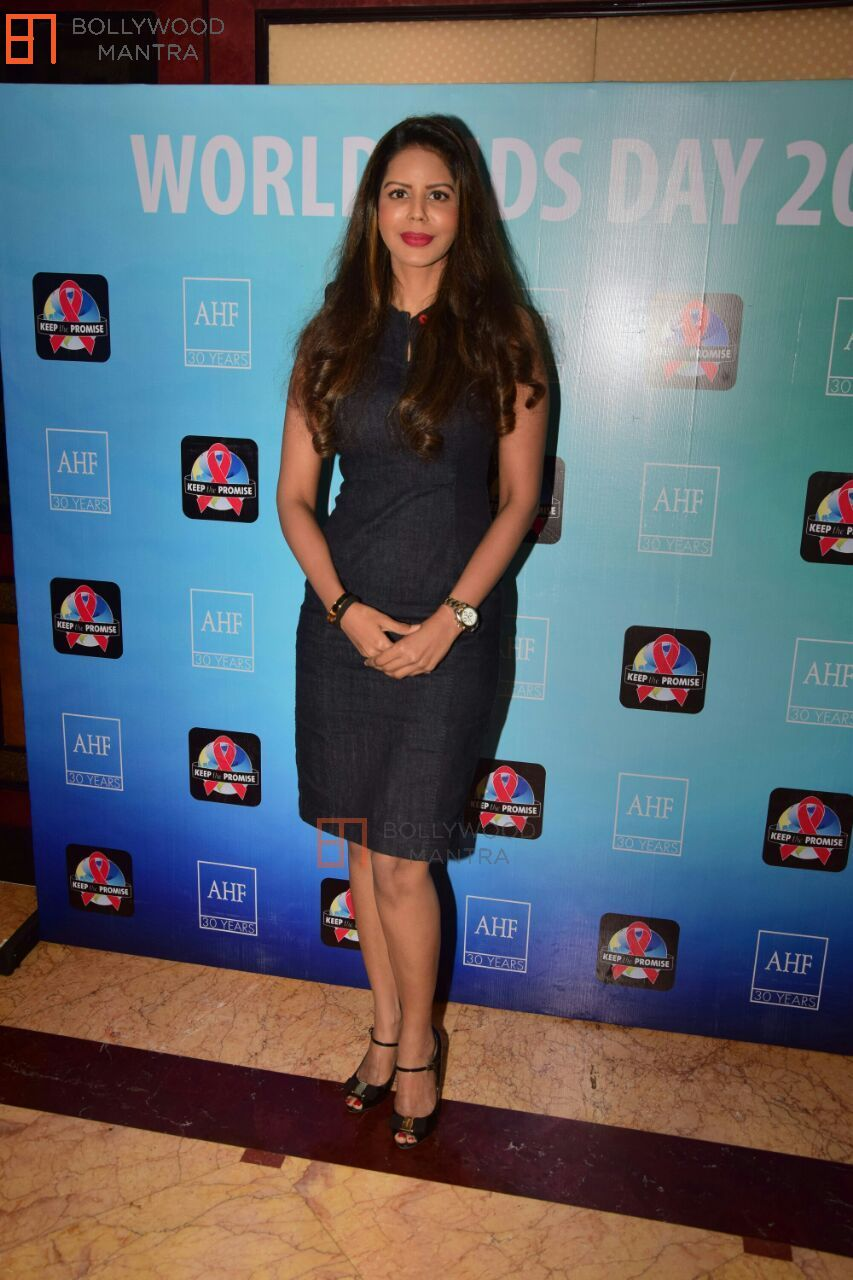
- Bhairavi Goswami at AIDS Healthcare Foundation Launch 'Keep the Promise'
- Born: India
- Occupations: Actress, model
- Years active: 2002–present
- Website: thebhairavigoswami.com

Bhairavi Goswami is an Indian actress, model, and television host.

== Early life ==
Bhairavi was born to parents of mixed heritage. Her father is part Bengali while her mother is Creole. Bhairavi left India at the age of 6 and returned as a teenager to pursue a career in modelling and acting, spending most of her adolescence in the United Kingdom.

== Career ==
=== Modelling ===
Bhairavi won the "Pantaloons Model Quest" and was runner up at the "AXN Hot & Wild" contest. The Times of India described her as "the Paris Hilton of India, who loves to socialise".

=== Movies and theatre ===
After her first movie role in Sagar Bellary's Bheja Fry, she acted in the children's hit composite animation film My Friend Ganesha 2. In her next film, Mr. Bhatti on Chutti, starring Anupam Kher with Amitabh Bachchan in a cameo appearance, she played a glamorous girl. Bhairavi shed her glamorous image to play a simple school teacher in Kachcha Limboo. She has ten plays to her credit, including Liar Liar, Tea Coffee or Me, Mad House and See no Evil, Hear no Evil, Speak no Evil

=== Music videos ===
- "Samundar Mein Nahake" remix directed by Samir Malkan
- Raaghav Sachar's first album directed by Indrajit Nattoji for Saregama
- "Raat Taakli"", Marathi music video directed by Deepali Vichare

=== Television credits ===
- JBC with Javed Jaffery
- Bollywood Live (Indonesia)
- Guest VJ on B4U
- Appeared on Movers & Shakers (Shekhar Suman Show)

== Filmography ==
Year	Film	Role
2014	Kamasutra - The Poetry of Sex	
2012	Mr.Bhatti on Chutti	Katy
2012	Hate Story	Bhairavi
2011	Kachha Limboo	Lily Fernandes
2008	My Friend Ganesha – 2	Anita
2007	Bheja Fry	Suman Rao

== Theatre ==
Genre	Play	Director	Notes
English comedy	Liar Liar	Dinyar Contractor	150 shows worldwide
English comedy	Madhouse	Dinyar Contractor	140 shows worldwide
English comedy	P Dialogues	Alyque Padamsee	10 shows in Mumbai
English comedy	Mad Horses of Matheran	Gary Richardson	195 shows
English comedy	Unspoken Dialogues	Alyque Padamsee	8 shows in Mumbai
Hindi comedy	Tea, Coffee Or Me		85 shows
English comedy	See No Evil, Hear No Evil, Speak No Evil	Paritossh Painter	50 shows worldwide
Hindi comedy	Shree, Adi, Manav	Paritossh Painter	5 shows in Mumbai
English comedy	Dil Maange More	Paritossh Painter	5 shows

== See also ==
- List of Indian film actresses
