= PariWar =

Indian web series

- Promotional poster
- Genre: Comedy
- Written by: Gaganjeet Singh; Shantanu Anam
- Directed by: Sagar Ballary
- Starring: Gajraj Rao; Ranvir Shorey; Yashpal Sharma; Sadiya Siddiqui; Nidhi Singh; Vijay Raaz; Anurita Jha; Kumar Varun
- Country of origin: India
- Original language: Hindi
- No. of seasons: 1
- No. of episodes: 6

Production
- Production location: India
- Cinematography: Parixit Warrier
- Editor: Suresh Pai
- Running time: 21- 27 min
- Production company: Arre Studios

Original release
- Network: Hotstar
- Release: 23 September 2020

PariWar is an Indian comedy series created for Disney+ Hotstar by Arre Studios starring Gajraj Rao, Ranvir Shorey, Yashpal Sharma, Sadiya Siddiqui, Nidhi Singh and Vijay Raaz. The series was premiered on Disney+ Hotstar on September 23, 2020.

== Premise ==
The series revolves around a family squabbling over a lucrative property which was donated to a theatre artist to build home for widowers.

== Cast ==
- Gajraj Rao as Kashiram Narayan
- Ranvir Shorey as Shishupal Narayan
- Yashpal Sharma as Mahipal Narayan
- Sadiya Siddiqui as Anju
- Nidhi Singh as Mandakini Narayan aka Guddan
- Anurita Jha as Manju
- Vijay Raaz as Gangaram Tripathi
- Abhishek Banerjee as Kanta Prasad Tripathi aka Munna
- Kumar Varun as Babloo
- Abhishek Singh as Patwari
- Neena Gupta as Kadambari (Special Appearance)
- Ajay Singh as Lalla Ram 6 episode

== Production ==
In September 2019, Hotstar commissioned the project from Arre Studios attaching Sagar Ballary to direct the project and with multiple actors joining the cast.

== Episodes ==
No.	Title	Directed by	Written by	Original release date
1	"Heart Attack!"	Sagar Ballary	Gaganjeet Singh; Shantanu Anam	23 September 2020
2	"Vidhur Ashram"	Sagar Ballary	Gaganjeet Singh; Shantanu Anam	23 September 2020
3	"Mrityuvijay Jaap"	Sagar Ballary	Gaganjeet Singh; Shantanu Anam	23 September 2020
4	"Dangal"	Sagar Ballary	Gaganjeet Singh; Shantanu Anam	23 September 2020
5	"Pari-War"	Sagar Ballary	Gaganjeet Singh; Shantanu Anam	23 September 2020
6	"Natyamandir"	Sagar Ballary	Gaganjeet Singh; Shantanu Anam	23 September 2020

== Release ==
The series premiered on Disney+ Hotstar, now called JioHotstar on September 23, 2020. The series is available for free for all the subscribers and non-subscribers as well.

== Reception ==
SpotboyE gave the "rib-tickling web series" 4/5 stars and called it "a must-watch." LetsOTT deemed it a "decent family drama lit up by the cast."
