= The White Tiger (2021 film) =

2021 film by Ramin Bahrani

- Official release poster
- Directed by: Ramin Bahrani
- Screenplay by: Ramin Bahrani
- Based on: The White Tiger by Aravind Adiga
- Produced by: Mukul Deora; Ramin Bahrani
- Starring: Adarsh Gourav; Priyanka Chopra; Rajkummar Rao
- Cinematography: Paolo Carnera
- Edited by: Tim Streeto; Ramin Bahrani
- Music by: Danny Bensi; Saunder Jurriaans
- Production companies: Lava Media; ARRAY; Noruz Films; Purple Pebble Pictures
- Distributed by: Netflix
- Release dates: 6 January 2021 (Las Vegas); 13 January 2021 (United States); 22 January 2021 (Worldwide)
- Running time: 125 minutes
- Countries: United States; India
- Languages: English; Hindi

The White Tiger is a 2021 black comedy drama film, written and directed by Ramin Bahrani. The film stars Adarsh Gourav, Priyanka Chopra, and Rajkummar Rao. The film was produced by Mukul Deora and Ramin Bahrani, and executive produced by Chopra Jonas, Prem Akkaraju, and Ava DuVernay. An adaptation of Aravind Adiga's 2008 novel, the story is about Balram, who comes from a poor Indian village and uses his wit and cunning to escape from poverty.

Adiga published his book and decided to adapt it into a film in late 2010, with the rights being sold to producer Mukul Deora. Bahrani was chosen to helm the adaptation, and was eager to do so, having read early drafts of the novel even before it was published. Filmed extensively across Delhi in October to December 2019, The White Tiger premiered at Las Vegas on 6 January 2021, and was screened at limited movie theatres in the United States on 13 January. It was released globally through the streaming platform Netflix on 22 January 2021. The White Tiger received positive reviews from critics who praised its direction, screenplay, cinematography and the performances by the cast. At the 93rd Academy Awards, the film was nominated for Best Adapted Screenplay.

== Plot ==
In 2010, entrepreneur Balram Halwai emails Chinese premier Wen Jiabao, requesting a meeting, and relating his life story. He states his belief that the Indian underclass is trapped in a perpetual state of servitude, like chickens in a chicken coop.

As a young boy in Laxmangarh, Balram is offered a scholarship to a school in Delhi because of his advanced academics. He is told that he is a "white tiger," someone born only once in a century. However, when his father is unable to pay off village landlord 'the Stork', Balram is forced by his grandmother to work in the village's tea stall, and he never returns to school. Balram's father dies from tuberculosis, with no doctor to treat him.

As a young man, Balram aspires to become a chauffeur for the Stork's son Ashok, who has returned from the United States with his Jackson Heights-raised wife Pinky. Balram has his grandmother sponsor his driving lessons, with the promise of sharing his chauffeur salary. Balram is hired as the Stork family's second driver, but is also given menial tasks to complete and is otherwise mistreated. Balram is kept loyal by the threat of him and his entire family being murdered if he were to conduct a betrayal.

Ashok and Pinky make plans to move to Delhi, where Ashok will bribe Indian politicians so that his family would avoid paying tax money. Balram, wanting to drive for them in Delhi, exposes the secret of the family's primary driver. After the primary driver is fired, Balram joins the couple in Delhi. In contrast to other members of their family, Ashok and Pinky generally treat Balram with respect and eventually become closer to him, though they still view him as a servant.

In Delhi, on Pinky's birthday, she and Ashok get drunk and force Balram to let Pinky drive, which results in her accidentally hitting and killing a child. The Stork family coerces Balram into signing a confession endorsed by his grandmother. Ultimately, nothing comes of it, but Balram is left shaken, and for the first time, is fully aware of how disposable he is to his employers.

Pinky leaves Ashok to return to New York, leaving Balram to emotionally support him. Balram realizes that loyal service to Ashok was no guarantee of a comfortable life once his services were no longer needed. Balram begins to defraud Ashok with fake invoices, while making money on the side by selling the car's petrol and using the car as an unlicensed taxi.

Balram encounters a series of setbacks. He angers the Stork family when he donates change to a beggar. Balram's grandmother unexpectedly sends one of his younger nephews to live with him in order to learn how to become a driver. Balram also learns that his grandmother is following through with her plans to get him married against his wishes. Meanwhile, Ashok prepares to pay a particularly large bribe, while also arranging to imminently replace Balram with a new driver.

Balram has an epiphany on how to escape servitude as the "white tiger". To obtain the bribe money, Balram murders Ashok with a broken whiskey bottle and flees the city with his nephew and the money. An arrest warrant is put out for Balram, but he evades capture.

Balram takes his nephew with him to Bangalore, then a bubble for large IT companies. He uses a portion of the stolen cash to bribe the police to eliminate taxi service providers for a lack of licenses. Balram starts his own taxi company, thus becoming wealthy himself. He treats his drivers as employees and not as servants. He takes personal and financial responsibility for any incidents caused by them, even employing a sibling of a child killed in an accident caused by a company driver. He sponsors his nephew's education, while acknowledging that his remaining family back home may have been killed by the Stork's men in retribution.

Happy to escape servitude, Balram reveals at the end of the film that he changed his name to Ashok Sharma.

== Cast ==
- Adarsh Gourav as Balram Halwai / "Ashok Sharma"
- Rajkummar Rao as Ashok Shah, Balram's master
- Priyanka Chopra as Pinky Shah, Ashok's wife
- Mahesh Manjrekar as The Stork, Ashok's father
- Vijay Maurya as Mukesh "The Mongoose" Shah, Ashok's older brother
- Kamlesh Gill as Granny Kusum, Balram's grandmother
- Swaroop Sampat as the Great Socialist
- Tawhid Rike Zaman as Balram's friend
- Vedant Sinha as Dharam, Balram's nephew
- Nalneesh Neel as Vitiligo Man

== Production ==
=== Origin ===
Producer Mukul Deora bought the rights for the adaptation of Indian writer Aravind Adiga's 2008 novel The White Tiger, which is about "an extraordinary journey of a self-made man from a tea-shop worker in a village to a successful entrepreneur in a big city". Deora chose director Ramin Bahrani, who also happened to be Adiga's college-friend, to helm the film. Bahrani had read the rough drafts of the novel years before it was published, with Deora stating: "He's very dedicated to adapt it into a film". Bahrani added "It's an epic story that required a lot of financing and money and resources to get it made in India, that wasn't so easy when the novel came out". He initially sold the distribution rights to Netflix, as Bahrani stated that "it had an appetite for global stories, for voices that are not typically represented behind a camera or in front of the camera".

When Priyanka Chopra Jonas scrolled through Twitter, she saw a headline that a film adaptation of the novel was in the works. She called her agent about the film to offer her collaboration. Thus, Chopra served as one of the executive producers of the film, under her banner Purple Pebble Pictures, alongside Prem Akkaraju, Ava DuVernay and Ken Kamins.

(The book) had a profound effect on me. It made me uncomfortable and made me think about a part of the world that we sort of desensitize ourselves to. When I read the book, I was fascinated with the perspective of the narrative. The story's portrayal of raw ambition and the extent one will go to achieve one's goals is riveting.

— Priyanka Chopra Jonas, about co-producing the film (in an interview with The Indian Express)

=== Writing ===
While Bahrani added and deleted a few sequences and adapted the character for the screen, the story stays largely faithful to the novel. He stated: "The hardest part was cutting things out, since I love the book so much. But when I put all of it in the script, it came to 200 pages! Aravind gave me a wealth of gold and cutting it is just not easy.” Initially, he considered updating the story (set in 2005) to a more recent setting, before abandoning the idea, as it is a period film. In the making of the script Baharani stated "One of the biggest changes today is that thing in your hand, the supercomputer. In today's world, Balram wouldn't be writing emails, he'd probably be doing video or Instagram. This is only the second time in my life that I've adapted a book and I wanted to stick to it."

=== Casting ===
Bahrani turned down some established stars for the part of Balram: “I had an opportunity to talk with a lot of actors, stars that you might know, Bollywood stars who are all incredible. But at a certain point, while I was in India, I felt that the lead actor should be from India and preferably unknown. I just felt it matched the character and the story of an underdog." Rajkummar Rao was also selected to play a prominent role in the film, along with Priyanka Chopra Jonas, despite serving as the co-producer. Before filming, Bahrani spent months in India, riding local buses, visiting the places Adiga had written about, and meeting scores of people, before eventually meeting Adarsh Gourav. Gourav prepared for his role by living anonymously in a remote village in Jharkhand and working for 12 hours a day, washing plates.

I didn't want to see a rich successful actor playing the part of that underclass underdog who's going to do something crazy in the film. And Adarsh (Gourav) just blew me away in the audition… He has this great winning smile, he's very charming and you like him immediately. But if you don't pay attention and you look at him again he's got a laser on you and you don't know what he might do – and I needed that duality.

— Ramin Bahrani, on casting Adarsh Gourav, as the main protagonist of the novel adapted film (in an interview with RadioTimes)

=== Filming ===
Both Rao and Jonas prepared for the sequences, with the actors beginning the script reading session, before the start of the shoot. The principal shoot of the film began in October 2019, with the cast and crew being present for the shoot, excluding Jonas, due to her involvement in the promotion of The Sky Is Pink (2019). Jonas joined the sets of the film's shooting in Delhi, on 2 November 2019, and while shooting for the series, she posted her picture on Instagram, with a caption stating that "it is too hard to shoot here", citing the climatic conditions and air pollution prevailing in the city. The White Tiger, was filmed mostly in Delhi, serving as the principal location. The shooting of the film was wrapped on 15 December 2019.

== Soundtrack ==
The White Tiger

Soundtrack album by Various Artists
- Released: 8 January 2021
- Genre: Feature film soundtrack
- Length: 30:42
- Language: Hindi
- Labels: Lakeshore Records; Netflix

The White Tiger's original score is composed by Danny Bensi and Saunder Jurrians. Its soundtrack album features reused compilations of various songs from independent artists, which ranges from different timelines. Two of the songs "Akh Lar Gayee" and "O Murari Re", were used as montages (songs that drive along with the storyline). The film features a promotional song "Jungle Mantra", which describes the life of Balram's character (Adarsh Gourav). Performed by Divine, along with American rappers Vince Staples, Pusha T and Jawadista, the song was released on 15 January 2021.

The score produced by Bensi and Jurrians, for the film, features Indian-inspired themes and sounds. Rohan Naahar of Hindustan Times praised the soundtrack album, stating: "The film is fuelled by a punchy hip-hop soundtrack and a frenetic energy".

Track listing
No.	Title	Lyrics	Music	Singer(s)	Length
1.	"Mundian To Bach Ke"	Rajinder Rai, Stu Phillips, Glen Larson	Panjabi MC, Stu Phillips	Panjabi MC	3:59
2.	"Akh Lar Gayee"	Prempal Hans, Hardeep Sidhu, Devinder Singh	Surinderjit Singh	Surinderjit Singh	3:27
3.	"Get It Poppin"	Joseph Cartegena, Andre Lyon, Scott Storch	Fat Joe	Fat Joe	3:26
4.	"Feel Good Inc."	Damon Albarn, Jamie Hewlett	Gorillaz	Gorillaz	3:43
5.	"O Murari Re"	Rohit K Sharma	Rohit K Sharma	Rohit K Sharma	3:19
6.	"Teri Baaton Mein"	Raghav Mathur	Raghav Mathur	Raghav Mathur	4:08
7.	"Mundian To Bach Ke" (Remix)	Rajinder Rai, Stu Phillips, Glen Larson	Panjabi MC, Stu Phillips	Panjabi MC, Jay-Z	3:42
8.	"Jungle Mantra"	Karan Kanchan	Divine	Divine, Vince Staples, Pusha T, Jawadista	4:00
Total length:					30:42

== Release ==
A press show for The White Tiger was premiered at Las Vegas on 6 January 2021, and was released in limited theaters in the United States on 13 January 2021. It was then digitally released globally through Netflix on 22 January 2021. Netflix reported that 27 million households watched the film over its first month, and appeared on the platform's Top 10 in 64 countries.

A lawsuit was filed against the makers by producer John Hart, citing copyright infringement. The producer stated that a literary auction agreement was executed between him and author of the book Aravind Adiga in March 2009 and he had to make it an Oscar worthy film to be released in Hollywood, which did not materialize. His plea was rejected by the Delhi High Court, as he did not have proof to approach the court less than 24 hours of its release.

== Reception ==
On review aggregator Rotten Tomatoes, the film holds an approval rating of 91% based on 164 reviews, with an average rating of 7.5/10. The website's critics consensus reads: "Well-acted and beautifully made, The White Tiger distills the strengths of its source material into a grimly compelling drama." On Metacritic, it has a weighted average score of 76 out of 100, based on 39 critics, indicating "generally favorable reviews".

Joe Morgenstern of The Wall Street Journal called the film "funny and ferocious" and described it as "a zestful epic blessed with rapier wit, casually dazzling dialogue, gorgeous cinematography and, at the center of it all, a sensational star turn by [...] Adarsh Gourav". Rating the film 3.5 stars out of 4, Michael Phillips of Chicago Tribune termed the film a "propulsive adaptation", writing: "The cast brings an edge and a drive to the telling, while cinematographer Paolo Carrera captures both the real-life grit and the dreamy, aspirational glamour of Balram's unsentimental education." David Rooney of The Hollywood Reporter wrote: "An immersive plunge into the chasm separating the servant class from the rich in contemporary India, the drama observes corruption at the highest and lowest levels with its tale of innocence lost and tables turned. If there's simply too much novelistic incident stuffed into the overlong film's Dickensian sprawl, the three leads' magnetic performances and the surprising twists of the story keep you engrossed." The Times's Kevin Maher rated the film four out of five stars, noting the film as "a dizzy, woozy, taxi ride to the dark side" and praised Chopra Jonas' performance, calling her "impressive". Anna M. M. Vetticad of Firstpost criticised the poor dialogue and “the erroneous assumption that caste has given way to class in modern India”, but appreciated the rewriting of Chopra Jonas’ character. She rated the film 2.5 out of 5 stars, and wrote: “Pandering to the Western viewer while fearful of the Hindutva mob - that is about as tricky as a tightrope walk can get, especially when the filmmaker's own understanding of India is evidently limited.”

Richard Lawson of Vanity Fair praised the acting and Bahrani's direction and screenplay, saying that the film brings the celebrated novel to vivid life. In his four out of five stars review, Robbie Collin of The Telegraph wrote "a punchy, propulsive watch, blown along by snappy editing and a hip-hop-driven soundtrack that stresses that there's still much fun to be had when hefty themes of inequality and geopolitics are being tackled." Bilge Ebiri of the New York magazine called the film "a Brutal, Powerful Tale of Ambition, Class, and Corruption" that "cuts across borders and continents, and [...] cuts into the soul as well". Peter Bradshaw of The Guardian gave the film four stars out of five, describing as a "Balzac-worthy satire of submission and power" and wrote "Bahrani [adapts and] also directs with terrific storytelling energy." Clarisse Loughrey from The Independent opined that the film was a "dark but exhilarating satire of capitalism". Peter Travers of ABC News praised the "throughout pitch perfect" acting and Bahrani's direction, writing "Ramin Bahrani keeps you on the edge of your seat." Owen Gleiberman of Variety opined that the film is "an ironic study of the psychology of servitude", praising the performances by Chopra Jonas and Gourav, whom he called "marvelous".

David Ehrlich of IndieWire gave the film a "B", calling it a "darkly comic thriller" and a "brutal corrective" to Slumdog Millionaire (2008). K. Austin Collins from Rolling Stone gave the film three out of five stars, writing that the film was a capable, compelling and topical drama but suffered "for giving us a setup that's richer than the follow-through." The critic praised Gourav's performances as "unassuming but pitch-perfect" and he felt that Rao and Chopra Jonas also gave equally worthy performances. In a mixed review, A.O. Scott of The New York Times deemed the film "a barbed rags-to-riches tale", and wrote: "The plot is lively, and the settings vividly captured by Bahrani and the director of photography, Paolo Carnera, but the characters don't quite come to life. They aren't trapped by prescribed social roles so much as by the programmatic design of the narrative, which insists it is showing things as they really are. If it wasn't so insistent, it might be more convincing." Jesse Hassenger of The A.V. Club criticised the film for only "hitting the key themes and scenes without finding an independent tone", while also adding that the overtly explaining narration repeatedly takes the reins away from Gourav's acting. Baradwaj Rangan of Film Companion wrote: "Like in 99 Homes, Bahrani directs with an eye on narrative propulsion rather than subtlety — but Balram's psychological arc is gripping, and the film is compulsively watchable."

== Awards and nominations ==
Award	Date of ceremony	Category	Recipient(s)	Result	Ref.
AACTA Awards	March 7, 2021	Best Lead Actor – International	Adarsh Gourav	Nominated	
Academy Awards	April 25, 2021	Best Adapted Screenplay	Ramin Bahrani	Nominated	
Asian World Film Festival	March 20, 2021	Snow Leopard Rising Star	Adarsh Gourav	Won	
British Academy Film Awards	April 11, 2021	Best Actor in a Leading Role	Adarsh Gourav	Nominated	
British Academy Film Awards	April 11, 2021	Best Adapted Screenplay	Ramin Bahrani	Nominated	
Independent Spirit Awards	April 22, 2021	Best Male Lead	Adarsh Gourav	Nominated	
Writers Guild of America Awards	March 21, 2021	Best Adapted Screenplay	Ramin Bahrani	Nominated	
