= Kambakkht Ishq =

2009 Indian film by Sabbir Khan

- Theatrical release poster
- Directed by: Sabbir Khan
- Screenplay by: Sabbir Khan; Ishita Moitra; Kiran Kotrial
- Dialogues by: Anvita Dutt Guptan
- Based on: Pammal K. Sambandam by Moulee
- Produced by: Sajid Nadiadwala
- Starring: Akshay Kumar; Kareena Kapoor; Aftab Shivdasani; Amrita Arora; Javed Jaffrey; Kirron Kher
- Cinematography: Vikas Sivaraman
- Edited by: Nitin Rokade
- Music by: Songs: Anu Malik; Bonus Track and Background Score: Salim–Sulaiman; Guest Composers: RDB
- Production company: Nadiadwala Grandson Entertainment
- Distributed by: Eros International
- Release date: 3 July 2009 (India)
- Running time: 135 minutes
- Country: India
- Language: Hindi
- Budget: ₹650 million

Kambakkht Ishq (originally released in the United States as Incredible Love) is a 2009 Indian Hindi-language romantic comedy film directed by Sabbir Khan and produced by Sajid Nadiadwala. The film is based on the 2002 Tamil film Pammal K. Sambandam which in turn was based on the 1999 film The Bachelor. The film stars Akshay Kumar and Kareena Kapoor in the lead roles, alongside Aftab Shivdasani, Amrita Arora, Jaaved Jaafrey and Kirron Kher in supporting roles. Sylvester Stallone, Denise Richards, Brandon Routh, Whoopi Goldberg, and Holly Valance appear as themselves in cameos.

Initially scheduled to release in December 2008, the film was postponed due to extensive production work and was released on 3 July 2009. It was a moderate success at the box-office.

A mobile video game based on the film was released by ASTPL.

== Plot ==
When stuntman Viraj Shergill and medical student Simrita Rai come across each other at his brother Lucky's and her best friend Kamini Sandhu's hastily planned wedding ceremony, they instantly develop a dislike for each other. Both have a very low opinion of the opposite sex, and staunchly believe marriage is not the way to go for the two newlyweds, whom they try to discourage from proceeding further.

Simrita convinces Kamini to test out her theory that men are after only one thing, by forcing Lucky to delay their marriage vows for three months. She is sure, Lucky will not be able to do so and this will prove to Kamini that Lucky was just another man, like all others, and her claims of him being different from most men are unfounded. Viraj, upon hearing about this new development, tries to do the exact opposite. This results in a hilarious scene at a local disco bar, where Viraj lures Kamini with the hope of her finding Lucky with a "girlfriend" that he has planted in the lap of Lucky in order to make Kamini jealous. The plan backfires because of a police raid and Kamini and Lucky end up in divorce court where the judge puts them on a three-month probation and marriage counselling. Simrita keeps on telling Kamini that all men are the same and that all they want is sex. Lucky tries to make love with Kamini but she never lets him come near her.

Meanwhile, Simrita and Viraj keep bumping into each other when they both travel to Italy independently; the former to make some quick cash as a model to pay her medical bills, and the latter, with Lucky, to chill out and take a vacation from all of the marital stress Lucky has been facing back home. Upon returning home, Simrita is given a watch pendant by her aunt Dolly to wear as a good luck charm. The pendant hangs from a bracelet on her wrist. Viraj gets seriously hurt in an accident at work and is brought for emergency surgery to the hospital where Simrita is an intern. Much to each other's irritation, Simrita is given the charge to perform surgery on Viraj. After the surgery, while looking at the X-rays, she is horrified to discover that the watch on her wrist has accidentally ended up in Viraj's stomach.

Simrita tries various ways of getting the watch out. During one such process, which fails, it becomes clear that Simrita is bitter about her perceived unfaithfulness of the two most prominent men from her childhood: her divorced father and her elder sister's ex-husband. By this time, Viraj is secretly beginning to fall in love with Simrita. Several days later, Simrita is successful in removing the watch from Viraj's stomach. Following the surgery, Viraj overhears the truth and leaves. Several days later, he proposes to Denise Richards in an attempt to forget about Simrita. Upon realising her mistake, Simrita helps Lucky and Kamini reconcile and decides to confess her love for Viraj at the wedding ceremony. At first, Denise is upset but then tells Viraj to go to Simrita. The two embrace and go off together in the car sharing a few passionate kisses.

== Cast ==
- Akshay Kumar as Viraj Shergill
- Kareena Kapoor as Simrita "Sim" Rai a.k.a. Bebo/Surgeon/Doctor
- Aftab Shivdasani as Lucky Shergill, Tiger's and Viraj's brother
- Amrita Arora as Kamini Sandhu, Simrita's friend
- Javed Jaffrey as Keswani
- Kirron Kher as Dolly Bindra, Simrita and Nimrita's aunt
- Vindu Dara Singh as Gulshan "Tiger" Shergill, Viraj's and Lucky's brother
- Rajesh Khera as Dr. Ali
- Kahkashan Patel as Nimrita "Nim" Rai, Simrita's sister
- Ashwin Mushran as Parmeet Sandhu, Kamini's brother

Cameos appearances

- Boman Irani as Dr. Sachin Mishra (ENT doctor)
- Whoopi Goldberg as Herself
- Brandon Routh as Himself
- Denise Richards as Herself
- Sylvester Stallone as Himself
- Holly Valance as Herself

== Production ==
=== Development and writing ===
In November 2007, producer Sajid Nadiadwala signed on Akshay Kumar to play the lead role in his film. Later that month Kareena Kapoor was signed on to play the female lead. It is the seventh time Kumar and Kapoor are paired on-screen. Kumar plays a Hollywood stuntman in the film and Kapoor plays an up-and-coming model. According to Nadiadwala, "It will be an international love story on a lavish scale."

The project was originally expected to commence filming in January 2008 in Los Angeles with nine actors from Hollywood but due to extensive pre-production work on the film, it was later shifted to May 2008. Reports indicated that actor and politician Arnold Schwarzenegger was signed on to do a cameo and that the film would feature a performance by singer and actress Beyoncé. Prashant Shah, line producer of Kambakkht Ishq in L.A. commented, "We are in talks with Beyoncé and we have also received a letter from Arnold's office...Things will be confirmed shortly and we will be making a formal announcement when that happens." It was later reported that neither star would be appearing in the film.

In March 2008, Nadiadwala announced that "this would be the first Indian film to be shot within Universal Studios." However, when a fire broke out on the backlot of Universal Studios on 1 June 2008, the shooting of the film was expected to be delayed. But the producer indicated, "so far the area where we are supposed to shoot remains unaffected. So for now, we are proceeding on schedule." Later that month, the cast finally began filming for the project in Los Angeles, California, where pivotal scenes were shot at the Kodak Theatre and Universal Studios. In August 2008, reports had indicated that the film was 50–60% complete and the cast would continue filming for the project in Venice, Italy. After completing their overseas schedule, the production team later headed to shoot in Mumbai, India.

During December 2008, reports surfaced indicating that Kumar and Kapoor would appear alongside Carmen Electra in a promotional music video for the film. In February 2009, Nadiadwala announced that Electra wouldn't be appearing in the music video and was replaced by the music group RDB. According to Nadiadwala, "It is not a music video but a song that we will use as an integral part of the film. It will occur close to the film's interval. It will also be the first promotional song." The first trailer of the film was shown alongside the release of Jehangir Surti's film Aa Dekhen Zara (2009).

== Music ==
=== Soundtrack ===
Kambakkht Ishq: Original Motion Picture Soundtrack

Soundtrack album by Anu Malik
- Released: 13 June 2009 (India)
- Recorded: 2009
- Genre: Film soundtrack
- Length: 41:03
- Label: Sony Music
- Producer: Anu Malik

Anu Malik chronology
Teree Sang (2009)	Kambakkht Ishq: Original Motion Picture Soundtrack (2009)	Toonpur Ka Super Hero (2010)

The music was composed by Anu Malik, with RDB and Salim–Sulaiman as guest composers.

No.	Title	Music	Singer(s)	Length
1.	"Om Mangalam"	RDB	RDB & Nindy Kaur	4:22
2.	"Lakh Lakh"	Anu Malik	Neeraj Shridhar	5:15
3.	"Bebo"	Anu Malik	Alisha Chinai, Suzanne D'Mello, Anushka Manchanda	4:19
4.	"Kambakkht Ishq"	Anu Malik	KK, Sunidhi Chauhan	4:51
5.	"Kyun"	Anu Malik	Shaan & Shreya Ghoshal	5:29
6.	"Om Mangalam" (Reprise)	RDB	RDB, Nindy Kaur	4:35
7.	"Lakh Lakh" (Electro Dhol House Remix)	Anu Malik	Eric Pillai, Benny Dayal	4:02
8.	"Bebo" (Club Mix)	Anu Malik	Kilogram K & G	3:38
9.	"Kambakkht Ishq" (Remix)	Anu Malik	Kilogram K & G	4:00
10.	"Kyun" (Female – Reprise)	Anu Malik	Shreya Ghoshal	4:30
11.	"Welcome To Hollywood"	Salim–Sulaiman	Karsh Kale, Anushka Manchanda	2:11

== Reception ==
=== Box office ===
Before the film's worldwide release of 3 July 2009, advance bookings for Kambakkht Ishq officially commenced from 28 June onwards to positive response from the public. The film grossed over Rs 10 million from its 125 advanced paid previews shown on Thursday [2 July 2009] night. On 3 July 2009, Kambakkht Ishq opened to an average response of 50-60% all over India. Making a first day total of Rs 85.0 million, the film emerged as the second biggest opening day gross of all time for a Bollywood film. For its opening weekend in India, Kambakkht Ishq accumulated a total of Rs 245.0 million from 1,400 screens. The following Monday, it grossed another Rs 40 million, and the following Tuesday it grossed Rs 30 million. At the end of its first week, Kambakkht Ishq collected a total of Rs 359.5 million. During its second week at the box office, the film showed a 70% drop in its collections; the movie was a semi-hit grosser overall at the box office.

Besides being released domestically in India, Eros International released the film in over 600 screens overseas in a combination of prints and digital format. For its opening weekend in the United Kingdom, the film debuted at number 8 and grossed £ 299,533 on 56 screens, for an average of £5,349 per screen. Kambakkht Ishq debuted at number 14 in the United States and number 11 in Australia, accumulating US$768,542 from 100 screens in the former and $152,626 from 17 screens in the latter. As of 29 July 2009, Kambakkht Ishq has grossed a total of £681,154 in the U.K. and $1,445,739 in the U.S.

=== Critical response ===
Noyon Jyoti Parasara from AOL India concluded, "The film has nothing going for it. It has a worryingly bad script, horrible screenplay, traumatising dialogues and unpleasant music." Parasara further explained, "Kambakkht Ishq is a shame when it comes to watching Indian films on the world stage." Rajeev Masand from CNN-IBN, who gave the film 1 star out of 5, noted that Kambakkht Ishq "is a loud, vulgar and seriously offensive film".

Taran Adarsh of indiaFM described Kambakkht Ishq as a film that would "strike a chord with the youth and those who relish zany and madcap entertainers". He praised the performances, direction, and writing, noting that the film would "see an earth-shattering opening weekend and a historic Week 1." Rachel Saltz from The New York Times concluded that "[the film] has only one frantic desire: to entertain. It spottily succeeds, despite its frequently crude humor, relentless pace and a few unpalatable racial bits."
