= Ugly Aur Pagli =

- Directed by: Sachin Khot
- Written by: Anil Pandey
- Produced by: Pritish Nandy; Rangita Pritish Nandy
- Starring: Ranvir Shorey; Mallika Sherawat; Vishal Malhotra
- Cinematography: Somak Mukherjee
- Edited by: Hemal Kothari
- Music by: Songs: Anu Malik; Score: Sameer Uddin
- Production company: Pritish Nandy Communications
- Release date: 1 August 2008
- Running time: 117 minutes
- Country: India
- Language: Hindi

Ugly Aur Pagli (English: Ugly and Crazy) is a 2008 Indian Hindi-language romantic comedy film directed by Sachin Khot and produced by Pritish Nandy. The film stars Ranvir Shorey and Mallika Sherawat. The film tells the story of the strange relationship between a young Mumbai engineering student and a girl he meets on the train. Ugly Aur Pagli is an uncredited remake of the 2001 South Korean film My Sassy Girl.

== Plot ==
Kabir (Ranvir Shorey) is an engineering student who has been studying engineering for the last ten years. He is a carefree lifestyle guy, which involves partying with friends and not caring about his responsibilities. And one cold winter night on way back to home at VT station in Mumbai he meets a drunk Kuhu (Mallika Sherawat).

Kabir thinks that his lifelong dream of having a girlfriend has come true, but for Kuhu he’s just a loser she wants to take for a ride. She makes him dance around in circles, run semi naked, ride cycles without seats, wear high heeled ladies shoes and so on. Kuhu, who is coping with a personal crisis, feels that the only way she can overcome it is to put someone else through misery. Kabir becomes the guinea pig and has to cope with the insane demands and tantrums of Kuhu.

Initially wary of Kuhu, Kabir slowly eases up to her and understands her feelings. The story takes a turn when Kabir discovers the true meaning of Kuhu's actions, and their implications follow.

== Cast ==
- Ranvir Shorey as Kabir Acharekar
- Mallika Sherawat as Kuhumini
- Vishal Malhotra as Raj Acharya
- Tinu Anand as Kuhu's father
- VJ Manish as Bilal Ahmed, Kabir's friend
- Sushmita Mukherjee as Kuhu's mother
- Gaurav Kapur as Hemal
- Bharti Achrekar as Kabir's mother
- Sayaji Shinde as Manager
- Payal Rohatgi as Girl in Bar and Elevator (Guest appearance)
- Sapna Bhavnani as Aditi (Guest appearance)
- Zeenat Aman as Sandhya (Special appearance)

== Reception ==
=== Box office ===
Ugly Aur Pagli grossed approximately ₹73.5 million (US$760,000) in its first week. Worldwide, the film grossed slightly over $7 million.

=== Critical response ===
The film had a mixed critical reception. There was praise for the performances of the lead pair and criticism of the film's plot.

Raja Sen of Rediff.com gave the film 1.5 stars out of 5, writing "My Sassy Girl works largely because the tone of everything in the film -- save from the cocky titular heroine -- is normal as toast, which is why placing sauce on it is tasty. Here, the treatment is consistently over-the-top and gets tiresome after the first act. While some of the lines are wicked good -- especially Ranvir's VO, which quirkily once labels Mallika a cross between Medha Patkar and Keshto Mukherjee -- there just aren't enough of them. Rajeev Masand in his reviews for CNN-IBN gave the film 2 stars out of 5, saying "I’m going with two out of five for director Sachin Khot’s Ugly Aur Pagli, shame on him and his writers for ripping off a film from start to finish and yet failing to come up with something half-way entertaining." Khalid Mohamed writing for Hindustan Times gave the film 2 stars out of 5.

== Music ==
The film's music was composed by Anu Malik with lyrics by Amitabh Verma.

1. "Karle Gunaah"- Ishq Bector, Anushka Manchanda
2. "Karle Gunaah II" – Ishq Bector, Krishna Beura
3. "Karle Gunaah (Remix By DJ A-Myth)" – Ishq Bector, Anushka Manchanda
4. "Shut Up, Aa Nachle" – Anu Malik, Vasundhara Das, Dibyendu Mukherji
5. "Talli" – Anmol Malik, Hard Kaur, Mika Singh
6. "Talli II" – Anu Malik, Hard Kaur
7. "Talli (Remix By DJ A-Myth)" – Anmol Malik, Hard Kaur, Mika Singh, J.J
8. "Yaad Teri Aaye" – Mohit Chauhan
9. "Ye Nazar" – Sunidhi Chauhan, Shaan
