= Bheja Fry (film) =

- Theatrical release poster
- Directed by: Sagar Ballary
- Based on: Le Dîner de Cons by Francis Veber
- Produced by: Sunil Doshi
- Starring: Vinay Pathak; Rajat Kapoor; Sarika; Ranvir Shorey; Milind Soman
- Cinematography: Parixit Warrier
- Edited by: Suresh Pai
- Music by: Sagar Desai
- Production company: Handmade Films
- Distributed by: Adlabs
- Release date: 13 April 2007
- Running time: 95 minutes
- Country: India
- Language: Hindi
- Budget: ₹5.4–15 million
- Box office: ₹125.8 million

Bheja Fry (transl. Brain fry) is a 2007 Indian Hindi-language comedy film directed by Sagar Ballary and produced by Sunil Doshi. The film stars Rajat Kapoor, Vinay Pathak, Sarika, Milind Soman and Ranvir Shorey. It was released on 13 April 2007. It is based on the 1998 French film Le Dîner de Cons.

== Plot ==
Ranjeet Thadani is a music producer married to Sheetal, a singer. Ranjeet and his friends get together every Friday for a party. This is a different kind of party where they invite idiots so that they can ridicule them behind the scenes and call them "talent." They enjoy doing it so much that they don't even mind missing out on family appointments.

One of Ranjeet's friends meets Bharat Bhushan, an inspector in the Income Tax Department, on a trip to Pune and decides that he could probably be a source of entertainment for Ranjeet. Ranjeet promptly calls Bharat and invites him for dinner.

Bharat is a talkative, self-promoting singer who carries with him a scrapbook showcasing his musical life. He is excited at the prospect of meeting a music producer, which might help advance his career as a singer. Bharat is kind-hearted and wants to help everyone, but he also has the ability to mess things up for people around him. He can be annoying to the person who is sitting next to him, but he makes it a funny experience for everyone else watching him.

Friday arrives, but Ranjeet's back is sprained badly and is restricted from moving around. Ranjeet knows that he will not be able to make it to the party but still decides to meet with Bharat to see how good, or rather how bad, he is. Before Bharat arrives at Ranjeet's residence, Sheetal leaves after an altercation with Ranjeet. When Ranjeet asks Bharat to call his family doctor, he accidentally calls Ranjeet's ex-girlfriend Suman Rao. Ranjeet asks Bharat to leave his home for all the mess he has created. Ranjeet tries to get information regarding Sheetal's whereabouts. Bharat offers to help and calls Sheetal's previous boyfriend Anant Ghoshal under a false identity. Instead, he ends up giving Ranjeet's landline number, which makes it obvious to Anant that Ranjeet is trying to get all the details. Anant tells Ranjeet that Sheetal might have gone to Keval Arora, a sex freak.

It turns out that a colleague of Bharat, Asif Merchant, who is also an inspector in the income tax department, knows the whereabouts of Keval. Asif is a snobby character who loves to watch cricket and is an ardent fan of Pakistan. While trying to mend the relationship between Ranjeet and Sheetal, Suman tells Bharat that he was called by Ranjeet to make a fool of him and have fun at his expense. This hurts Bharat, but the good-hearted Bharat still wants to help Ranjeet by letting Sheetal know how sorry Ranjeet is because of his acts and how much he loves her. However, he again messes up, and the film ends on a funny note.

== Cast ==
- Rajat Kapoor as Ranjeet Thadani
- Vinay Pathak as Bharat Bhushan
- Sarika as Sheetal Agarwal
- Ranvir Shorey as Asif Merchant
- Milind Soman as Anant Ghoshal
- Bhairavi Goswami as Suman Rao
- Tom Alter as Doctor Shepherd

== Production ==
Principal photography took place in mid-2006 in a Flat in Mumbai and was wrapped in 20 days.

== Music ==
1. "Kaun Kiska Hua Hai Yaha" - Vasundhara Das
2. "Bacha Hai Na Koi Raha" - Shaan

== Release ==
The film was originally set to be released on Television, however, it was decided that it will have a theatrical release. It was released on 13 April 2007.

== Reception ==
=== Box office ===
The film opened to an opening of ₹1.22 crore in its opening weekend; and lifetime collection was ₹8.98 crore in India. The film grossed ₹3.6 crore in other territories, for a worldwide total of ₹12.58 crore.

=== Critical response ===
Shubhra Gupta of The Indian Express gave a positive review, writing, "Good acting, enough novelty in the script, and very funny lines, even if they peter out occasionally. And a crackling performance by Vinay Pathak, as the songster for all occasions. With his movie, Pathak cements his position as one of our finest comic talents, who can overplay, underplay, and offer up unforced hilarity."

Conversely, Namrata Joshi of Outlook gave the film two out of four, writing, "In the second half the fun degenerates into crassness." Khalid Mohamed of Hindustan Times gave the film one out of five, writing, "An occasionally mild comedy would have been endurable to a degree (lines about songs from Mahal and Pakeezah do draw a giggle). But on another level, Bheja Fry is extremely irresponsible and objectionable."

== Sequel ==
A sequel under the title Bheja Fry 2 released on 17 June 2011 and was filmed in Malaysia. The sequel featured Vinay Pathak reprising his role as the lead, and the only character remaining from the original, with new cast including Minissha Lamba, Kay Kay Menon and others.

== See also ==
- Mr. Garagasa, 2008 Kannada remake
- April Fool (2010 film), remake in Malayalam
