= Man Push Cart =

- Directed by: Ramin Bahrani
- Written by: Ramin Bahrani
- Produced by: Ramin Bahrani
- Starring: Ahmad Razvi; Leticia Dolera; Charles Daniel Sandoval
- Cinematography: Michael Simmonds
- Edited by: Ramin Bahrani
- Music by: Atif Aslam
- Distributed by: Films Philos (North America)
- Release dates: September 2005 (Venice Film Festival); October 16, 2006 (United States)
- Running time: 87 minutes
- Country: United States
- Language: English

Man Push Cart is a 2005 American independent film by Ramin Bahrani that tells the story of a former Pakistani rockstar who sells coffee and bagels from his pushcart on the streets of Manhattan.

== Plot ==
Early every morning, Ahmad (Ahmad Razvi), a Pakistani immigrant, struggles to drag his heavy cart along the streets of New York to a corner in Midtown Manhattan, where he sells coffee and bagels. He encounters a wealthy Pakistani businessman who offers him some work and financial assistance, promising also to introduce him to the music scene. He also spends time with a young Spanish woman who works in a nearby newspaper and magazine kiosk. He is haunted by the death of his wife and is unable to spend time with his son. Just as it appears that he is making some progress in improving his life, an event occurs that pushes him back down again.

== Music ==
Three songs by Pakistani singer-songwriter Atif Aslam were included in the film. "Aadat" is the main track while portions of the songs "Ehsaas" and "Yakeen" are also introduced in the film. All are taken from his debut album Jal Pari.

== Critical reception ==
The film was met with critical acclaim; some critics have compared the film to the style and films of the Italian Neorealism and French New Wave movements. The film has a score of 89% on Rotten Tomatoes based on 54 reviews with the consensus being that "This compassionate portrait of a New York City street vendor is as beautiful as it is melancholy."

Film critic Roger Ebert of the Chicago Sun-Times awarded the film four out of four, and wrote that the film "embodies the very soul of Italian neo-realism" and went on to say "Free of contrived melodrama and phony suspense, it ennobles the hard work by which its hero earns his daily bread" and "Bahrani, as director, not only stays out of the way of the simplicity of his story, but relies on it; less is more, and with restraint he finds a grimy eloquence."

Michael Wilmington of the Chicago Tribune liked the film and wrote a positive review saying "Ahmad's concerns — his sadness and his striving — become universal. Though his early-morning riser's world is gray and threaded with melancholy, it becomes, in the end, a place we recognize."

Dana Stevens of Slate wrote in her review "If one of the things movies are supposed to do is make you look anew at the world around you, you may never see your doughnut vendor in the same way again." This was also iterated by Jack Matthews of the New York Daily News who said "You'll think of him the next time you pass a cart."

Johnathan Rosenbaum of the Chicago Reader in his positive review said "it's a potent mood piece, and its portrait of urban loneliness has some of the intensity of Taxi Driver without the violence."

Time Out magazine wrote of the film saying, "What begins as a delineation of a man in a landscape becomes a study in sadness and stoicism, disorientation and even desperation, then finally, a delicate, rewarding and cliché-free enquiry into the complex heart of the lone immigrant experience."

Stephen Holden of The New York Times liked the film and gave it a positive review saying "Man Push Cart is an exemplary work of independent filmmaking carried out on a shoestring. Mr. Razvi’s convincing performance is a muted portrait of desolation bordering on despair."

Kevin Thomas of the Los Angeles Times wrote "It's by no means an exaggeration to describe this quietly powerful film as Bressonian."

== Awards ==
The film had its world premiere at the 2005 Venice Film Festival. It entered the 2006 Sundance Film Festival and won the Fipresci Critic's Award at the London Film Festival. It was nominated for three Independent Spirit Awards and was on Roger Ebert's list of the top 10 movies of 2006.
