= Chop Shop (film) =

- Theatrical release poster
- Directed by: Ramin Bahrani
- Written by: Bahareh Azimi; Ramin Bahrani
- Produced by: Jeb Brody; Lisa Muskat; Marc Turtletaub
- Starring: Alejandro Polanco; Isamar Gonzales; Rob Sowulski; Carlos Zapata; Ahmad Razvi
- Cinematography: Michael Simmonds
- Edited by: Ramin Bahrani
- Music by: M. Lo
- Production company: Big Beach Films
- Distributed by: Koch-Lorber Films
- Release dates: May 21, 2007 (Cannes); February 27, 2008 (United States)
- Running time: 84 minutes
- Country: United States
- Language: English
- Box office: $221,227

Chop Shop is a 2007 American drama film co-written, edited, and directed by Ramin Bahrani. The film tells the story of a twelve-year-old street orphan living and working in Willets Point, an area in Queens, New York, filled with automobile repair shops, scrapyards and garbage dumps.

Chop Shop premiered at the 2007 Cannes Film Festival.

== Plot ==
Chop Shop tells the story of Alejandro "Ale" (Alejandro Polanco), a 12-year-old Latino street orphan from Queens, New York. The film opens with Ale waiting by a roadside with several other men for work. A man in pickup truck arrives looking for two workers. He tells Ale that he is not needed but Ale jumps into the back of the truck anyway. After realizing that Ale is in the back, he stops the truck and sends Ale on his way with some money for breakfast. Ale spends the rest of the day selling chocolate and candy to train passengers with his friend Carlos (Carlos Zapata). After they finish selling the candy, Carlos informs Ale that Rob (Rob Sowulski), the owner of an auto repair shop in Willets Point, is looking for new workers.

Ale begins working at the repair shop, which Rob has also allowed him to live in. He is soon joined by his sister Isamar ("Izzy", played by Isamar Gonzales) who he finds work for in a van selling food to workers on the street. Ale later finds a van being sold by Carlos' uncle that he believes he can fix up and turn into his and Izzy's own food van business. The two begin saving their money to buy the $4,500 van. One night, Ale and Carlos go to the nearby truck stop to see prostitutes working. There they discover that Isamar is working as a prostitute. Ale is disheartened by the fact but does not confront Isamar about it. The two continue working and saving their money for the van. Ale makes additional money by selling unlicensed DVDs, hubcaps he steals from cars parked at the nearby stadium, and working for another auto shop owner, Ahmad (Ahmad Razvi) by stripping down stolen cars.

One day, after hearing his sister talk on the phone to what he believes is a prostitution customer or a boyfriend, he steals some money from his sister and, together with the money they have saved, buys the van from Carlos' uncle. When he gets Ahmad to look into the repair of the van, however, he is informed that the interior of the van is unfit to serve food in and would cost around $10,000 to fix up. Angry that Carlos' uncle ripped him off, Ale starts a fight with Carlos. With his dreams crushed, Ale goes to the stadium and snatches a woman's handbag and gets a phone he fails to sell. Isamar questions him about the phone. He yells at her and demands that she "should be working," meaning she should be selling herself as a prostitute to make money for them. Isamar realizes her brother knows about her secret. Ale decides to get the van stripped for parts worth $1,000.

Ale then goes to the truck stop to look for Isamar. He attacks the man receiving fellatio from his sister, and the two of them run back to the auto shop. When they get there, Isamar hides in the toilet and doesn't speak to Ale. The film ends the next day with Ale feeding seeds to the area's pigeons to cheer her up. The pigeons' sudden arrival makes Isamar smile with her brother. She then scares them away and they go flying up into the sky.

== Cast ==
- Alejandro Polanco as Alejandro "Ale"
- Isamar Gonzales as Isamar "Izzy"
- Rob Sowulski as Rob
- Carlos Zapata as Carlos
- Ahmad Razvi as Ahmad
- Cesar di Parra

== Production ==
Chop Shop was filmed and takes place in the neighborhood of Willets Point, Queens in the area around Shea Stadium. It was made using primarily non-actors in the style of neorealism.

The film was shot using the Sony F900.

== Critical reception ==
The film received positive reviews from critics. Review aggregator website Rotten Tomatoes reports a 96% approval rating with an average rating of 7.9/10, based on an aggregation of 52 reviews. It describes the consensus of reviewers as, "Filled with excellent performances, Ramin Bahrani's deft sophomore effort is a heartfelt, hopeful neorealist look at the people who live in the gritty underbelly of New York City."

Chop Shop appeared on some critics' top ten lists of the best films of 2008. Andrew O'Hehir of Salon named it the 3rd best independent film of 2008. Roger Ebert of the Chicago Sun-Times named it as not only one of the 20 best films of 2008, but also the sixth best film of the decade, and later included it in his list of great movies.

== Awards and nominations ==
- Cannes Film Festival, Official Selection Director's Fortnight
- Toronto International Film Festival, Official Selection
- American Film Institute Film Festival, International Competition
- Berlin Film Festival, Official Selection Generation
- Independent Spirit Award, Someone to Watch Director - Ramin Bahrani, Winner 2007
- Independent Spirit Award, Best Director - Ramin Bahrani, Nominee 2008
- Independent Spirit Award, Best Cinematography - Michael Simmonds, Nominee 2008
- Gotham Award, Alejandro Polanco, Breakthrough Actor, Nominee
