= The Greater Good (film) =

Anti-vaccination propaganda film

The Greater Good is an anti-vaccination propaganda film. It debuted at the Dallas International Film Festival on April 2, 2011, and began playing in Los Angeles, California on October 14, 2011. The film was endorsed by controversial doctor Joseph Mercola on his website, as part of "Vaccine Awareness Week", a joint venture with the anti-vaccine organization National Vaccine Information Center.

The conjecture presented in the movie that vaccines might cause autism is not supported by scientific evidence, and originated in a fraudulent research paper.

== Critical reception ==
The New York Times criticized the movie, calling it "emotionally manipulative," and "heavily partial."

Variety's John Anderson reviewed the film, saying that it is "swimming in ethical contradictions." Anderson also stated, with regard to the film's potential bias, "Admittedly, it would have been difficult for the filmmakers to show the other side of those scenes; how do you focus on subjects who haven’t died from smallpox, diphtheria or pertussis because they were immunized as children? But that would require an approach that doesn’t take advantage of the audience’s emotions."

David Gorski criticized the movie, lamenting that the film "which could have been a provocative debate about current vaccine policy based on asking which vaccines are necessary and why, in the end opts to be nothing more than pure anti-vaccine propaganda of the lowest and most vile sort."

LA Weekly's Veronika Ferdman wrote that "Though there are pro-vaccine interviewees, this film has a clear agenda in encouraging skepticism toward vaccination."
