= Kaccha Limboo =

- Kaccha Limboo
- Directed by: Sagar Ballary
- Written by: Sagar Ballary; Jyothi Kapoor (dialogue); Manaswini Lata; Ravindra
- Starring: Taheer Sutarwala; Atul Kulkarni; Armaan Malik
- Cinematography: Parixit Warrier
- Edited by: Suresh Pai
- Music by: Amardeep Nijjer
- Release date: 18 February 2011
- Country: India
- Language: Hindi

Kaccha Limboo is an Indian movie which was released on 18 February 2011. It stars Taheer Sutarwala, Sarika, Atul Kulkarni, Vinay Pathak and Armaan Malik. The film revolves around a 13-year-old boy named Shambu.

== Plot ==
The words Kaccha Limbo denote a child who is not mature enough. The movie follows the trials and tribulations of 13-year-old Shambu. His friends in school ostracize him for being obese, calling him names. Despite his school problems, Shambu does have a loving and caring family. He does not seem to relate to his stepfather, who seems to have a highly sympathetic attitude. He has a crush on a girl, who does seem to despise him for his looks. He continues talking to her as an anonymous person on the phone.

Things take a turn for the worse when he accidentally damages another student's video camera, for which he is asked to pay damages. On the same day, his forgery of his parents' signatures in the school diary is found out. He runs away from home and finds a new friend in Vitthal, who lived in a slum.

The power of friendship and deep understanding is revealed by one of the slum children he befriends. Shambu is listened to by this special friend despite his looks, and then things take a turn when Shambu tries to save the life of this friend, who eventually dies.

== Cast ==
- Taheer Sutarwala as Shambu Bandookwala Shrivastava aka Shams
- Sarika as Kanchan Bandookwala Shrivastava, Shambu's mother
- Atul Kulkarni as Abhay Shrivastava, Shambu's step-father
- Vinay Pathak as Raj Gupta, Abhay's friend
- Amrita Raichand as English Teacher
- Rajesh Khattar as School Principal
- Armaan Malik as Armaan
- Karan Bhanushali as Vitthal
- Bhairavi Goswami as Lily Fernandes
- Iravati Harshe
- Simran Jehani as Veeneta Kapadia
- Rukhsar Rehman as Chandni Gupta, Raj's wife

== Critical response ==
In a mixed review The Times of India rated the movie 2.5 stars out of five, writing that while "the film began on a right note" as it traced "the world of oddball Shambhu", it changes tracks and that "Shambhu's extended encounters with Vitthal, the bustee kid" end up derailing the plot. Shaikh Ayaz of Rediff.com gave the film 2 out of 5, writing, "Sadly, instead of building on it, or maybe because the director's trying to develop the camaraderie into something ever-lasting, Kaccha Limboo drags with a total lack of focus." Taran Adarsh of Bollywood Hungama gave the film 1.5 out of 5, writing, "On the whole, KACCHA LIMBOO comes across as an unripe and undeveloped effort. Disappointing!"
