= Jungle Cry =

2022 Hindi film Directed by Sagar Ballary

- Directed by: Sagar Ballary
- Screenplay by: Dipankar Giri; Shubhodeep Pal; Diane Charles
- Produced by: Prashant Shah; Jaswant Shah; Jessica Kaur
- Starring: Abhay Deol; Emily Shah; Atul Kumar
- Cinematography: Parixit Warrier
- Edited by: Suresh Pai
- Music by: Rohit Kulkarni; Palash Muchhal
- Production company: Lionsgate Play
- Distributed by: Lionsgate Play
- Release date: 3 June 2022
- Running time: 117 minutes
- Country: India
- Languages: Hindi; English

Jungle Cry is an Indian Hindi language sports drama film directed by Sagar Ballary. The film stars Abhay Deol, Emily Shah and Atul Kumar in the lead role. The movie was released on 3 June 2022 on Lionsgate Play.

== Cast ==
- Abhay Deol as Rudra Singh
- Emily Shah
- Atul Kumar
- Joynal
- Julian Lewis Jones as Dale Bright (South Africa coach)
- Ross O'Hennessy as Tim Harris
