= Peacock orchid =

Peacock orchid is a common name for several orchids and may refer to:

- Gladiolus murielae;
- Pleione (plant);
- Psychilis.
