= At Any Price =

2012 film

- Theatrical release poster
- Directed by: Ramin Bahrani
- Written by: Ramin Bahrani; Hallie Elizabeth Newton
- Produced by: Ramin Bahrani; Pamela Koffler; Justin Nappi; Teddy Schwarzman; Kevin Turen; Christine Vachon
- Starring: Dennis Quaid; Zac Efron; Kim Dickens; Heather Graham; Clancy Brown
- Cinematography: Michael Simmonds
- Edited by: Affonso Gonçalves
- Music by: Dickon Hinchliffe
- Production companies: Big Indie Pictures; Black Bear Pictures; Cineric; Killer Films; Noruz Films; Treehouse Pictures
- Distributed by: Sony Pictures Classics
- Release dates: August 30, 2012 (Venice); April 24, 2013 (United States)
- Running time: 104 minutes
- Country: United States
- Language: English
- Box office: $487,455

At Any Price is a 2012 American crime drama film directed by Ramin Bahrani and written by Ramin Bahrani and Hallie Newton. The film, starring Dennis Quaid and Zac Efron, was selected to compete for the Golden Lion at the 69th Venice International Film Festival, and later screened as an official selection at both the Telluride Film Festival and the 2012 Toronto Film Festival. Sony Pictures Classics purchased the film and it was released in the United States on April 24, 2013.

== Plot ==
An ambitious farmer Henry Whipple discusses with his 20-year-old son Dean about the art of sales. Dean is reluctant to be as ruthless as his father as they offer condolences and also unscrupulously attempt to purchase land during a family funeral. After returning home, Henry rolls out the red carpet for his eldest son Grant, who has left the farm and mentions returning via a postcard, but it appears that he's unlikely to return. As the story progresses, we see that Henry is having an affair with Meredith Crown, his ex-girlfriend from high school, and his ongoing selfish decisions will continue to derail his future. He has created enemies within the genetically modified (GMO) seed-selling business including Jim Johnson—his main competitor—and fails to help those that have helped him by buying cheaper illegal "cleaned" seeds in his search for more money and land.

Dean desires to become a professional race car driver as a means to escape the generations of family farming and his father's neglect (and undesirable sales techniques). He spends much of his spare time training for races and hanging out with his 18-year-old girlfriend Cadence Farrow. She appears to be a typical country girl, but also displays sales savvy to help Henry, as well as being aware of the father and son attraction to pretty gals like Meredith.

During yet another local racing competition which he wins, Dean's aggressive driving causes the crash of Jim Johnson's son, Brad. They fight after the race, further fueling the feud between Henry and Jim. Racing scouts give Dean an opportunity to race at a professional level. He needs $15,000 to compete and his mother Irene supplies it. This causes tension with Henry who is worried about his illegal dealings catching up with him.

Dean falters during his NASCAR opportunity by slowing when pressured by aggressive drivers during the race. He knows his opportunity to leave the farm is now gone and he spirals downwards, drinking and having sex with Meredith Crown, which damages his relationship with Cadence. One night, Dean purposely drives his car into a tree in a field which requires hospitalisation and a long recovery period. Shortly after he's released from the hospital and fully recovers, Dean's father buys him another race car, but he is not interested anymore.

Henry is followed and confronted by Liberty investigators, the company he buys and sells his GMO seeds from. He has been "cleaning" seeds and reusing rather than buying from Liberty. If found guilty, he will likely be bankrupt and lose everything. Meanwhile, Cadence and her friend Andy drop in on Meredith Crown's house after she finds out about Dean's cheating, dishonest behavior and starts throwing rocks at her door and windows. Meredith confronts her and threatens to have her thrown in jail, but Cadence slaps her across the face and angrily states, "Find your own boyfriend, old whore." Upon realizing that Cadence found out about her and Dean's affair, a shocked Meredith decides to cut ties from Henry Whipple and his son for good.

The next morning, Dean finds out about his father's crime from Cadence, who also breaks up with him and tells him that their relationship is over. Devastated over the loss of his girlfriend and shocked at the news of his father's crimes, Dean searches for the informant who contacted Liberty. He wrongly believes it is their major sales opponent, Jim Johnson. He ends up in another altercation with Jim Johnson's son Brad on the side of the road and, after some fighting, he hits Brad with a hammer causing his death. Together with his father they bury Brad and the hammer in a deep well.

Henry finds out the real informant is Larry Brown, the tenant farmer who missed out on the land Henry purchased at the start of the movie. Henry offers Brown a (life tenancy) for free if Brown will "call off" Liberty investigators. Dean's mother is aware something is wrong with Dean and Henry and that they may have been involved in Brad's disappearance. When she confronts Henry, he informs her that he alone was responsible. Dean is listening, realizing his father does truly love him and that he is also permanently indebted to him.

Life goes on with Dean becoming more like his father as they easily outsell their main opposition Jim Johnson, who is a shell of a man after his son's disappearance. Though Dean has helped his father win back some of their clients, he never spoke to Meredith Crown again or dated other girls after his painful breakup with Cadence. Henry almost confesses to Jim about what happened to his missing son, but then falls back into his capitalist persona, letting him know they have retaken some of his clients. Dean's ex-girlfriend Cadence, who was leaving town to establish a new life for herself, bids farewell to Henry Whipple and thanks him for letting her work for him. Irene receives one of several postcards in an ongoing series from her overseas traveling son, suggesting once again he would be home soon. The movie ends with Henry, Dean and Irene Whipple putting on a party at their home for clients and friends with strained smiles on their faces.

== Cast ==
- Dennis Quaid as Henry Whipple
- Zac Efron as Dean Whipple
- Kim Dickens as Irene Whipple
- Heather Graham as Meredith Crown
- Clancy Brown as Jim Johnson
- Ben Marten as Brad Johnson
- Chelcie Ross as Byron
- Red West as Cliff Whipple
- Maika Monroe as Cadence Farrow
- Sophie Curtis as Aubrey

== Reception ==
At Any Price received mixed to positive reviews. On the review aggregator website Rotten Tomatoes, 52% of 100 critics' reviews are positive, with an average rating of 5.7/10. The website's consensus reads: "At Any Price features a terrific performance from Dennis Quaid, and it offers further evidence of Ramin Bahrani's unique eye for detail, but film is weighted down by an overly melodramatic story." Metacritic, which uses a weighted average, assigned the film a score of 61 out of 100, based on 33 critics, indicating "generally favorable" reviews.

Film critic Roger Ebert gave the film 4 out of 4 stars, praising Bahrani for delving deep into the plot with layers and themes that communicate effectively and singling out Dennis Quaid's performance as his best as "a flawed man with selfish values, a man for whom business success has seemed desirable no matter what its human cost."

Stephen Holden of The New York Times said that the performances of Quaid and Efron help deviate the film away from its credit straining plot twist, saying that they "drive them home in a movie that sticks to your ribs and stays in your head." Noel Murray of The A.V. Club gave the film a "C−", finding it a disappointment with its complex farmland plot being wasted with performances and dialogue "at the level of a Founders' Day pageant". Holden also noted that Bahrani's intention of making a mainstream film with substance will detract his usual audience, saying that "He's treating them like dolts by making a film that holds to the corniest aspects of Hollywood storytelling, interrupted by bullet points."

== Box Office ==
The film was a box office bomb and eventually earned about $487,455 after a limited theatrical release, not earning enough to pay off its $2-$4-million-dollar budget.
