= Mukul Deora =

Indian film producer, musician and entrepreneur

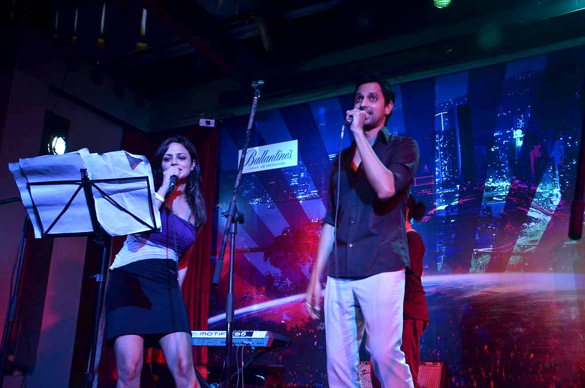
- Deora performing at Bob Dylan tribute
- Born: 12 July 1974 (age 52)
- Education: King's College London (BBA)
- Occupations: Filmmaker; startup investor
- Known for: Producer of The White Tiger
- Title: Founder and CEO of Lava Media

Mukul Deora (born 12 July 1974) is an Indian film producer, musician and entrepreneur based in Mumbai, India. He is best known for his music album Stray and producing The White Tiger (2021). Deora is a serial entrepreneur in packaging technology, digital content storage, workspace development, and film production and distribution. He is a multimedia artist who has performed at TED Talks India, Tate Modern, and Serpentine Gallery. Deora acquired the rights to the bestselling book series Gajapati Kulapati in 2023.

== Film career ==
In 2011, Deora developed and produced Bheja Fry 2, starring Vinak Pathak and Kay Kay Menon, and has since distributed over 40 films via his company Watchtower Pictures.

Deora acquired the rights to the Man Booker prize-winning novel The White Tiger and subsequently developed and produced The White Tiger, a film adaptation of the same, with Netflix. The White Tiger is a 2021 drama film written and directed by Ramin Bahrani (Fahrenheit 451 and 99 Homes). The film stars Adarsh Gourav, award-winning actor Rajkummar Rao (Stree, Bareily Ki Barfi, Newton), and global icon Priyanka Chopra Jonas (Isn't it Romantic, A Kid Like Jake, The Sky Is Pink) in pivotal roles. An adaptation of Aravind Adiga's 2008 novel of the same name, the story is about Balram, who comes from a poor Indian village and uses his wit and cunning to escape from poverty. The film was number one on Netflix in 64 countries and was seen by 27 million households in its first four weeks.

== Music career ==
Deora released his debut album Stray with SONY BMG in 2006. Stray was written, composed and produced by Mukul. Howie B, who has previously produced U2 and Björk came on as Executive Producer. Stray reached number 12 in the Indian charts, and was a critical success, with the UK's Guardian newspaper calling it "an uneasy, surreal new vision of India." Pennyblackmusic said "It's a hallucinatory experience; burgeoning with tension and personal angst, existential bafflement and the estrangement that can only truly occur when utterly surrounded by a metropolis of millions. Think of 'Naked Lunch' set in Bombay, remixed by William Gibson and starring a subcontinental Serge Gainsbourg with a penchant for better living through chemistry ... that's about as close as you're going to get. It's fascinating." Whisperin and hollerin's Huw Jones says – "Constantly expanding on themes and getting ever complex, Mukul's kaleidoscope of audio delights showcase his heritage, Djing background and innovative thinking. Whilst never outright dark, there's a potentially deviant side to his music that slowly hangs in the balance and becomes claustrophobic, but at no point does it become too oppressive, not just yet anyway, it's a fine balance, but one that Mukul can strike with ease."

In 2011 and 2012, Deora had a month-long radio show on Bob Dylan.

== Entrepreneurship ==
Deora was the founder and CEO of Sonopress India, a division of Bertelsmann.

In 1999, Deora founded Mipak Polymers, a packaging solutions company that was acquired by Hitech Corporation in 2006. Mipak had over 300 employees and 4 factories across India.

Deora founded Watchtower Pictures in 2008, which developed and produced Bheja Fry 2 and distributed 40 films including Krrish 3, English Vinglish, and Cocktail (2012 film).

In 2016, Deora founded Lava Media to shape culture through technology and produced the Oscar and BAFTA-nominated global hit film The White Tiger, starring Priyanka Chopra and Rajkummar Rao. Lava acquired the rights to the bestselling book series Gajapati Kulapati in 2023. Gajapati Kulapati won the Best of Indian Children's Writing (BICW) Award in 2018.

== Gaming and Transmedia ==
Deora joined Tara Gaming as a board director and transmedia producer in 2026.

== Performances ==
In 2008, Deora directed The Body Electric, with Shezaad Dawood. The Body Electric was used to launch the prestigious UK Cultural Olympics, and was projected on Norwich Castle for 2 days.

Dawood/Deora also performed at the Serpentine Gallery, London, as part of the Indian Highway show.

In 2009, Deora had a solo art show titled BREAK in Mumbai. BREAK was a participative experiment. On entering the gallery, the audience was instructed to take a shuttle bus to an undisclosed location. They arrived at a derelict mill compound where they were asked to sign a disclaimer stating that they accepted full responsibility for any injury that might occur. They were then led to the scene which consisted of a car and sledgehammers. A situation was thus created, where the audience joined the experiment by smashing the car. It became an energetic, passionate, struggle, in which extremes of emotion were given free expression against that quintessential symbol of modernity, the automobile. By 2012, BREAK had achieved near-mythological status, and Diesel + Art had an exhibition with images and videos from the 2009 event.

Deora performed at TED India, where he collaborated with Kalaripayattu dancers to create a piece called The Wandering Arrow- a juxtaposition of an ancient Indian martial form with modern abstract electronic music.
