= Minissha Lamba =

Indian actress (born 1983)

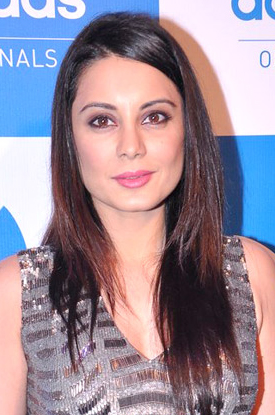
- Lamba at Snoop Dogg Adidas bash in 2019
- Born: 18 January 1983 (age 43); New Delhi, India
- Occupation: Actress
- Years active: 2005–2023
- Spouse: Ryan Tham (m. 2015; div. 2020)
- Partner: Akash Malik (2021–present)

Minissha Lamba (born 18 January 1983) is an Indian actress who appears primarily in Hindi films. Lamba made her acting debut with Yahaan (2005). Her notable films include Corporate (2006), Honeymoon Travels Pvt. Ltd. (2007), Bachna Ae Haseeno (2008), Well Done Abba (2010) and Bheja Fry 2 (2011). In 2014 she participated in the reality show Bigg Boss 8.

== Early life ==
Minisha Lamba was born into a Punjabi Sikh family, to Kawel Lamba and Manju Lamba in New Delhi in 1985.

She studied at Chettinad Vidyashram School, Chennai for a year and then shifted to Army Public School, Srinagar where she completed her schooling. She majored in English (Hons.) from Miranda House, University of Delhi.

== Career ==
While studying at Delhi University, Lamba began to model for ad campaigns like LG, Sony, Cadbury, Hajmola, Airtel, Sunsilk etc. She was also a part of the Femina's Generation "W" ad. During an ad shoot for Cadbury she was approached by Bollywood director, Shoojit Sircar, who signed her to act in his film Yahaan (2005). She had begun filming for Yahaan while still in Miranda House college. She subsequently began to play supporting and then leading roles in films such as Corporate, Rocky: The Rebel, Anthony Kaun Hai, Honeymoon Travels Pvt. Ltd., Anamika, Shaurya and Dus Kahaniyaan.

In 2008, she starred as one of Ranbir Kapoor's love interest in the romantic comedy Bachna Ae Haseeno, her biggest success so far, which was produced by Yash Raj Films. Same year, she was noticed for her role in Sanjay Gadhvi's Kidnap. Her next major role was in the critically acclaimed director Shyam Benegal's film Well Done Abba (2010). "Well Done Abba" was awarded the National Film Award for Best Film on Social Issues for the year 2010 and Minissha's performance as Muskaan Ali was appreciated. In 2014, she participated in Colors TV's Bigg Boss 8. She got evicted after 6 weeks on 2 November 2014 (Day 42). One of her last appearances was a role in Double Di Trouble, alongside Dharmendra, Gippy Grewal, Gurpreet Ghuggi, Kulraj Randhawa, and Poonam Dhillon. She has also appeared in the music video for Himesh Reshammiya's song "Tera Surroor" from the album Aap Kaa Surroor, which became very popular.

=== Theatre ===
In 2018, Lamba made her theatre debut with the play Mirror Mirror, directed by Saif Hyder Hasan and presented by AGP World.

In 2019, she appeared in the stage play Hello Zindagi, directed by Raman Kumar and produced by Rahul Bhuchar under the banner of Felicity Theatre.

== Personal life ==
Lamba married Ryan Tham - a restaurateur, owner of Juhu nightclub "Trilogy", and cousin to actress Pooja Bedi, on 6 July 2015. They announced the finalisation of their divorce proceedings in August 2020. In July 2021, she made her relationship with businessman boyfriend, Akash Malik, public.

== Filmography ==
=== Films ===
Year	Title	Role	Notes	Ref.
2005	Yahaan	Adaa		
2006	Corporate	Megha Apte		
2006	Rocky: The Rebel	Priya		
2006	Anthony Kaun Hai?	Jia Sharma		
2007	Honeymoon Travels Pvt. Ltd.	Zara		
2007	Dus Kahaniyaan	Priya	Story: "Puranmasi"	
2008	Bachna Ae Haseeno	Mahi Pasricha Ahluwalia		
2008	Kidnap	Sonia Raina		
2008	Shaurya	Kaavya Shastri		
2008	Anamika	Jia Rao		
2010	Well Done Abba	Muskaan Ali		
2011	Bheja Fry 2	Ranjini		
2011	Hum Tum Shabana	Shabana Raza		
2012	Joker	Aanya		
2013	Zilla Ghaziabad	Fauji's girlfriend		
2013	Heer and Hero	Maahi	Punjabi film	
2013	Black Currency	Intelligence Agent		
2014	Double Di Trouble	Harleen	Punjabi film	

=== Television ===
Year	Title	Role	Notes	Ref.
2008	Chhoona Hai Aasmaan	Kavya Shastri		
2014	Bigg Boss 8	Contestant		
2016	Comedy Nights Bachao	Guest		
2018	Tenali Rama	Chandrakala		
2018	Internet Wala Love	Mahira Kapoor		
2023	Badtameez Dil	Hausla "Hailey" Kaur Dhillon	Amazon miniTV series	

== Awards and nominations ==
Year	Award	Category	Work	Result	Ref.
2006	Screen Awards	Most Promising Newcomer – Female	Yahaan	Nominated	
2007	Stardust Awards	Best Breakthrough Performance – Female	Corporate	Nominated	
2009	Stardust Awards	Best Actress	Shaurya	Nominated	
2011	Stardust Awards	Best Actress	Well Done Abba	Nominated	
