= Plastic Bag (film) =

- Directed by: Ramin Bahrani
- Written by: Ramin Bahrani; Jenni Jenkins
- Produced by: Adam Spielberg; Ramin Bahrani
- Starring: Werner Herzog
- Music by: Kjartan Sveinsson
- Release date: September 7, 2009 (Venice)
- Running time: 18 minutes
- Country: United States
- Language: English

Plastic Bag is a 2009 American short film directed by Ramin Bahrani, who also co-wrote it with Jenni Jenkins and produced it with Adam Spielberg. The titular bag is voiced by German filmmaker Werner Herzog, while the film's score is composed by Icelandic musician Kjartan Sveinsson, best known as the keyboardist for rock band Sigur Rós.

Plastic Bag premiered as the opening night film of Corto Cortissimo in the Venice Film Festival. It later screened at Telluride and the New York Film Festival. The film is part of the Independent Television Service (ITVS) online series Futurestates and was produced by Noruz Films and Gigantic Pictures.

== Plot ==
In the near future, a plastic bag goes on an epic journey in search of its lost maker, wondering if there is any point to life without her. The bag encounters strange creatures, brief love in the sky, a colony of prophetic torn bags on a fence, and the unknown. To be with its own kind, the bag travels into the Great Pacific Garbage Patch.

== Screenings ==
- Corto Cortissimo, Venice Film Festival, 2009
- Official Selection, New York Film Festival, 2009
- Official Selection, Telluride Film Festival, 2009
- Official Selection, South by Southwest Film Festival, 2010
