= The Screening Room =

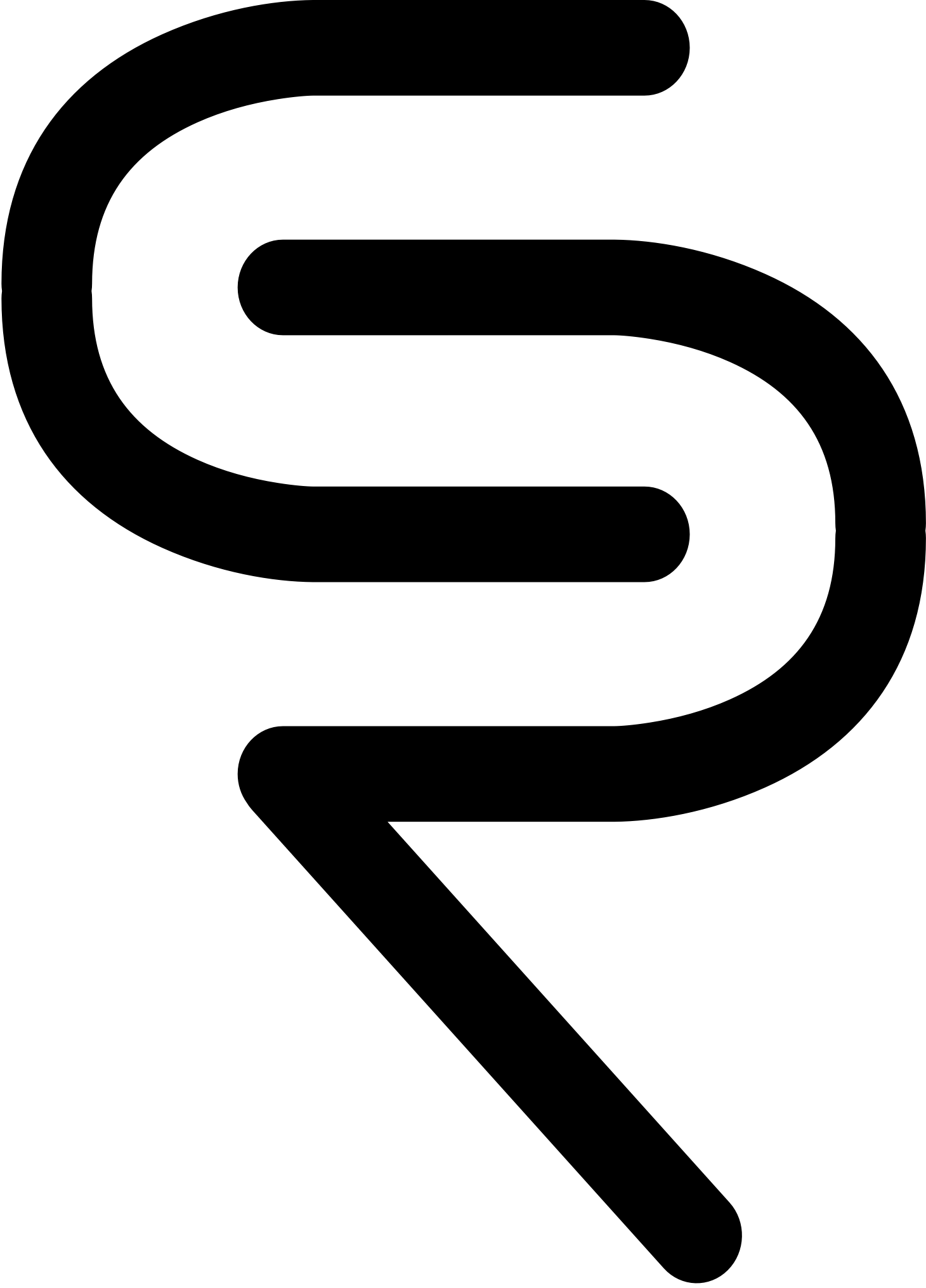
- Founders: Sean Parker, Prem Akkaraju

The Screening Room is a proposed service that would stream movies to the home the same day its released in theaters.

== Service ==
It was co-founded by Sean Parker (the co-founder of Napster) and Prem Akkaraju who also was its CEO. The Screening Room shareholders include filmmakers Steven Spielberg, Ron Howard, J. J. Abrams, Martin Scorsese and Peter Jackson.

In April 2020, The Screening Room announced it raised $27.5 million in equity and named Man Jit Singh as CEO. Man Jit Singh was the former President of Home Entertainment at Sony Pictures. Sean Parker and Prem Akkaraju remain on the board of directors and Prem Akkaraju has been elevated to Executive Chairman. The Screening Room, now renamed SR Labs, has been issued thirteen US technology utility patents involving the company's proprietary software to delivery high quality and secure film content.
