= Ramin Bahrani =

American film director (born 1975)

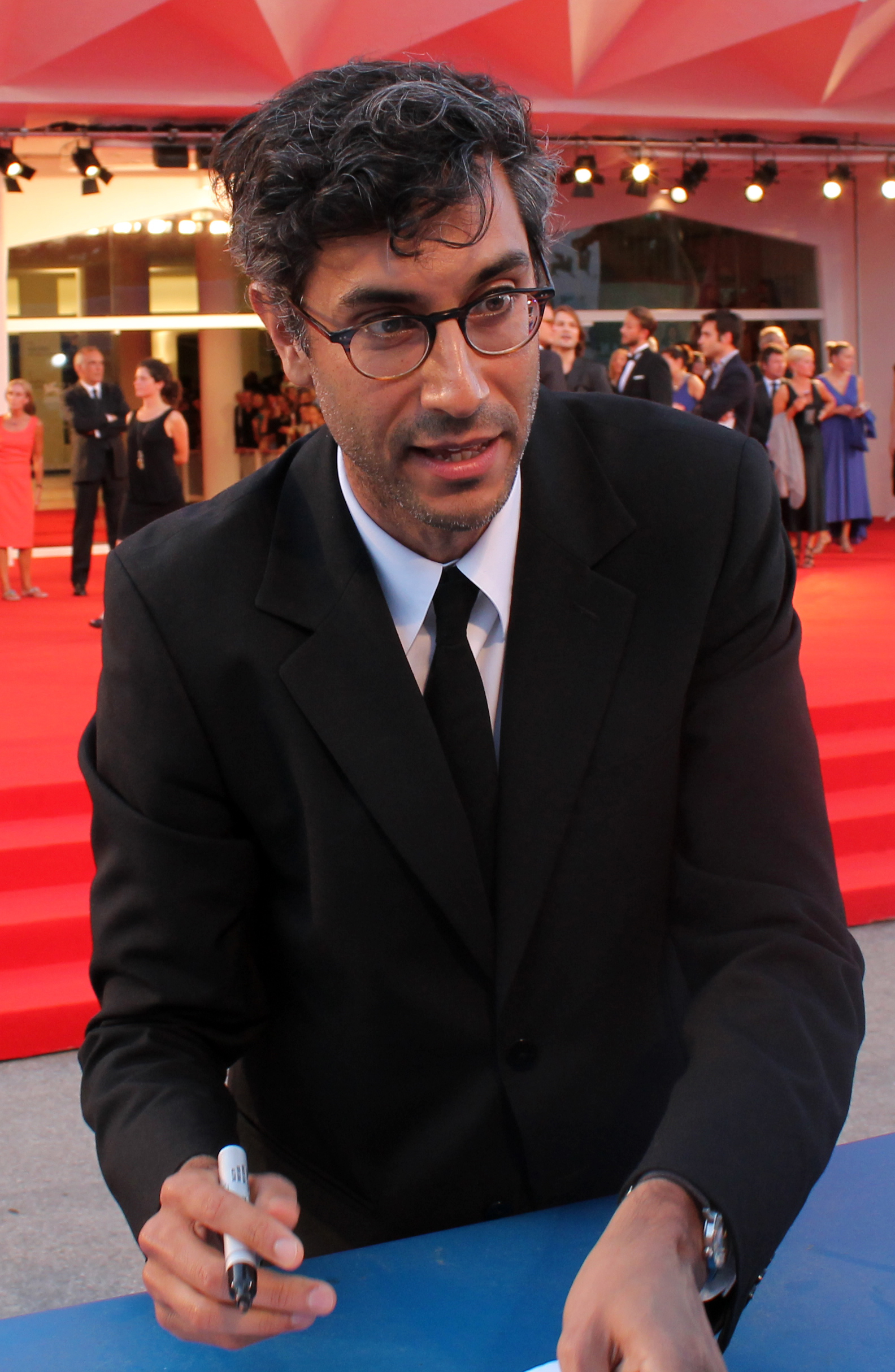
- Bahrani at the 2014 Venice International Film Festival
- Born: March 20, 1975 (age 51); Winston-Salem, North Carolina, U.S.
- Education: Columbia University (BA)
- Occupations: Director, writer, producer
- Years active: 2005–present

Ramin Bahrani (Persian: رامین بحرانی; born March 20, 1975) is an American director and screenwriter. Film critic Roger Ebert ranked Bahrani's Chop Shop (2007) as the sixth-best film of the 2000s, calling him "the new director of the decade". Bahrani was the recipient of the 2009 Guggenheim Fellowship. Bahrani is a professor of film directing at his alma mater, the Columbia University School of the Arts.

In 2021, Bahrani was nominated for the Academy Award for Best Adapted Screenplay for The White Tiger. He is also a BAFTA and Emmy Award nominee.

== Early life and education ==
Bahrani was born in Winston-Salem, North Carolina, the son of Iranian immigrants. His father, originally from Shiraz, initially exposed him to the poetic works of Hafez and encouraged him to pursue his passion for the arts. He received his Bachelor of Arts degree from Columbia University in 1996. Bahrani also studied filmmaking in Iran and briefly lived in Paris after graduating from college.

== Career ==
Bahrani's first feature film, Man Push Cart (2005), premiered at the Venice Film Festival and screened at the Sundance Film Festival in 2006. The film won over ten international prizes, was released worldwide, and was nominated for three Independent Spirit Awards.

Bahrani's second film, Chop Shop (2007), premiered at the 2007 Director's Fortnight of the Cannes International Film Festival, and then screened at the Toronto International Film Festival (2007) and the Berlin International Film Festival (2008) before being released theatrically to wide and positive reviews. Bahrani won the 2007 Independent Spirit Someone to Watch Award, and was nominated for the 2008 Independent Spirit Best Director Award.

Goodbye Solo, Bahrani's third feature film, premiered as an official selection of the Venice Film Festival (2008) where it won the international film critics' FIPRESCI Award for Best Film, and later had its North American premiere at the Toronto International Film Festival (2008). The film was called a "masterpiece" by numerous critics including Roger Ebert, and A. O. Scott of The New York Times.

In 2009, he made a short film, Plastic Bag, with the voice of German filmmaker Werner Herzog and an original score from Kjartan Sveinsson of the band Sigur Rós. Plastic Bag premiered as the opening night film of Corto Cortissimo in the Venice Film Festival, where Bahrani was also on the jury for Best First Films. It was later screened at Telluride and The New York Film Festival. In 2012, he made a music video of the song "Eg anda" for the Sigur Rós album Valtari.

Bahrani's fourth feature film, At Any Price (2013) stars Dennis Quaid, Zac Efron, Heather Graham, Kim Dickens, Clancy Brown and Chelcie Ross. It was selected to compete for the Golden Lion at the 69th Venice International Film Festival. The film, despite its relative star power and a notable performance by Dennis Quaid, received mixed reviews from most critics and earned less than $500,000 at the box office.

Bahrani's fifth feature film, 99 Homes (2015), opened to strong reviews at the Venice Film Festival, and was nominated for a Golden Globe Award.

Bahrani's film for HBO, Fahrenheit 451, an adaptation of Ray Bradbury's 1953 dystopian novel of the same name, was released on May 12, 2018, receiving mostly negative reviews.

In 2021, he adapted Aravind Adiga's 2008 novel The White Tiger as a feature film of the same title on Netflix, to positive critical reception. At the 93rd Academy Awards, the film was nominated for Best Adapted Screenplay, but lost to The Father.

In 2026, Bahrani was announced as director and co-writer of The Rancher, a female-led thriller set in rural Texas for Netflix. The film is based on a spec by Melanie Toast and produced by Toby Jaffe for RDV Films. The project follows Bahrani’s work on Vegas: A Love Story and his previously announced drama Last Meals.

== Filmography ==
Short film

Year	Title	Director	Writer	Producer	Editor
1998	Backgammon	Yes	Yes	Yes	No
2005	Dogs	Yes	Yes	Yes	Yes
2009	Plastic Bag	Yes	Yes	Yes	Yes
2014	Lift You Up	Yes	Yes	Yes	No
2014	Lemonade War	Yes	Yes	Yes	No
2018	Blood Kin	Yes	Yes	Yes	No

Feature film

Year	Title	Director	Writer	Producer	Editor	Notes
2000	Strangers	Yes	Yes	Yes	No	
2005	Man Push Cart	Yes	Yes	Yes	Yes	
2007	Chop Shop	Yes	Yes	No	Yes	
2008	Goodbye Solo	Yes	Yes	Yes	Yes	
2013	At Any Price	Yes	Yes	Yes	No	
2015	99 Homes	Yes	Yes	Yes	Yes	
2021	The White Tiger	Yes	Yes	Yes	Yes	Nominated- Academy Award for Best Adapted Screenplay; Nominated- BAFTA Award for Best Adapted Screenplay; Nominated- Writers Guild of America Award for Best Adapted Screenplay
2022	2nd Chance	Yes	Yes	Yes	No	Documentary

Television

Year	Title	Director	Producer	Writer	Editor	Notes
2010	Independent Lens	Yes	Yes	Yes	Yes	
2018	Fahrenheit 451	Yes	Executive	Yes	No	TV movie
2019	Treadstone	Yes	Executive	No	No	Episode "The Cicada Protocol"
2022	The Last Days of Ptolemy Grey	Yes	Executive	No	No	Episode "Reggie"

== Recognitions ==
- FIPRESCI Prize, London Film Festival (2005)
- Someone to Watch Independent Spirit Award (2008)
- FIPRESCI Prize, Venice Film Festival (2008)
- Guggenheim Fellowship (2009)
- United States Artists Fellow award (2010)
