= Vanai =

Vanai or Venai (Persian: ونايي) may refer to:

- Vanai, Kermanshah
- Venai, Khuzestan
- Vanai, Lorestan
- Vanai, Dahanu, India
