= Vani (disambiguation) =

Vani is a town in Georgia.

Vani may also refer to:

- Vani (writer) (1917–1988), Indian writer in Kannada
- Vani (Nashik), Hindu religious place in Maharashtra, India
- Vani (custom), child marriage custom of Pakistan
- Vani, Iran, a village in Kermanshah Province, Iran
- Vani, stylistic school of the Indian classical music genre dhrupad
- Vani (film), a 1943 Indian Kannada-language musical drama film
- Vani (given name), Indian feminine given name

== See also ==
- Wani (disambiguation)
