= Devika Daftardar =

Indian actress

- Occupation: Actress
- Years active: 2002–present

Devika Daftardar is an Indian actress who works in Marathi theatre and films. She is known for her mother roles in Pari Hoon Main (2018) and Naal (2018).

== Career ==
Devika started her career in Marathi plays before moving on to films. She starred in several Marathi films including Pari Hoon Main (2018) opposite Nandu Madhav before getting her breakthrough for her portrayal of a mother in Naal (2018).

== Filmography ==
- All films are in Marathi, unless otherwise indicated.

Year	Film	Role	Notes
2002	Vastupurush	Kalyani	
2004	Devrai	Kalyani	
2006	Nital	Dr. Neeraja Kaushik	
2006	Badha	Sarjabai	
2007	Nirop	Jui	
2007	Sawar Re	Indu	
2008	Majhi Aai	Aai	
2009	Ek Cup Chya	Durga Khanolkar	
2011	Shala	Bendre Bai	
2012	Ha Bharat Maza	Mrs. Sukhatme	
2013	Samhita	Revati Sathe, Queen Maalvika	
2013	Baromas	Alka	
2013	Astu	Devika	
2015	Nagrik	Kusum	
2015	Carry On Maratha	Kusum's aunt	
2016	Kaasav	Maanav's Mother	
2018	Pari Hoon Main	Sajiri's mother	
2018	Nidraay	Doctor	
2018	Naal	Sumi Bhosale	Zee Chitra Gaurav Puraskar for Best Supporting Actress
2019	Purushottam	Politician	
2019	George Reddy	Leela Varghesin	Telugu film
2019	Girlz	Meena Desai	
2019	Berij Vajabaki	Aarya's mother	
2021	Rajkumar	Sujata's Mother	
2022	Palyad	Lakshmi	
2023	Three Legged Horse	Rathore's Mother	
2023	Naal 2	Sumi Bhosale	
2023	Unaad	Bandya's mother	Nominated, Zee Chitra Gaurav Puraskar for Best Supporting Actress
2024	Karmavirayan	Laxmi	
2024	Karmayogi Abasaheb	Krushnabai Deshmukh	
2025	Saubhagyavati Sarpanch	Avali Bhusle	
2025	Abeer	Hirabai	
2026	Jayanti 2	Prof. Girija	
