= Mohit Takalkar =

Indian theatre director, filmmaker, film editor, screenwriter

Mohit Ratnakar Takalkar
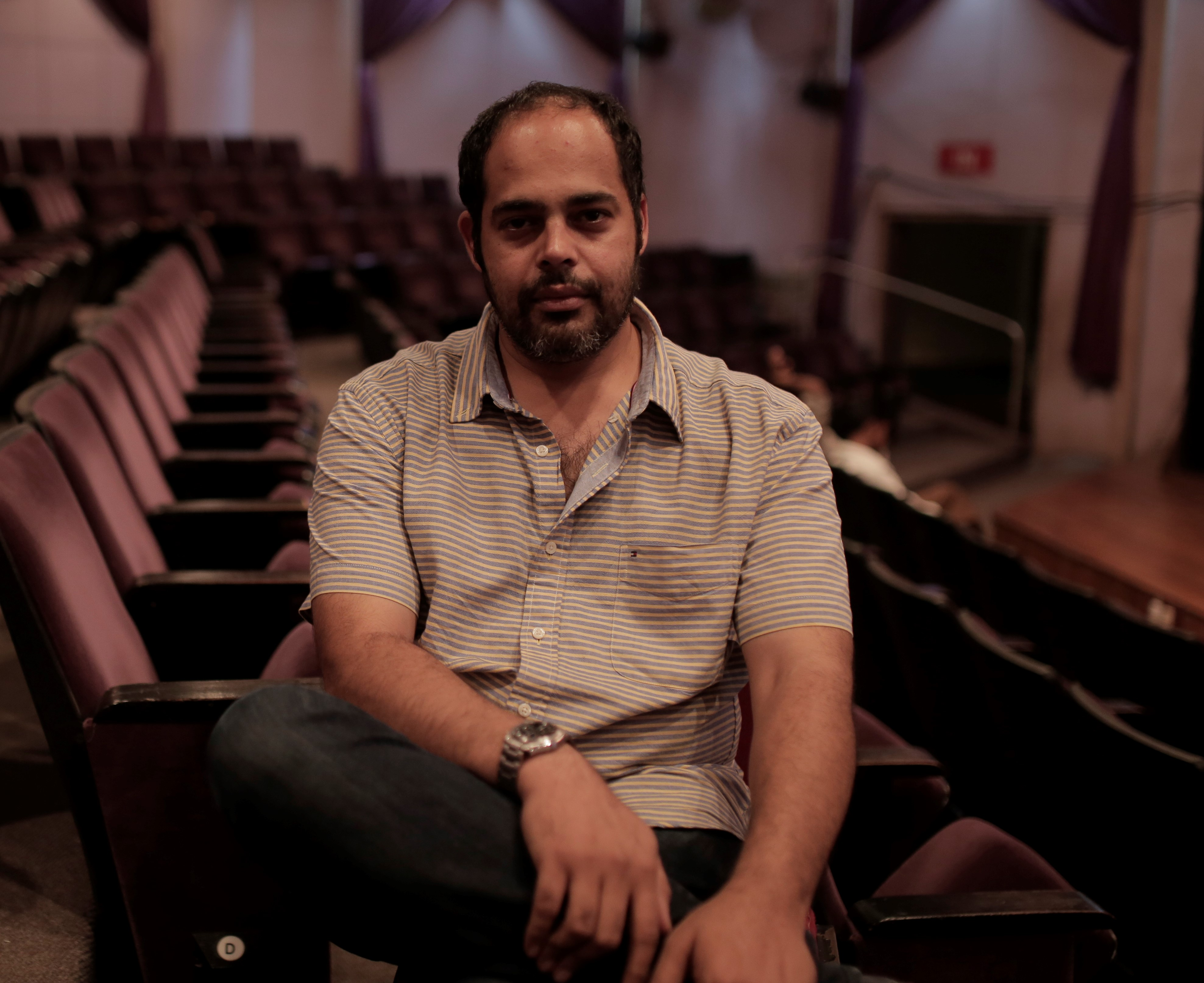
- Born: 18 August 1977 (age 49); Kalyan, Maharashtra
- Education: Graduation from Institute of Hotel Management, Mumbai and Masters in Theatre Practice & Direction from the University of Exeter, UK
- Occupations: Theatre Director, Filmmaker, Film Editor and Restaurateur
- Parents: Ratnakar Takalkar (father); Aparna Ratnakar Takalkar (mother)

Mohit Ratnakar Takalkar (born 18 August 1977) is an Indian theatre director, filmmaker, and film editor based in Pune, Maharashtra. He is a co-founder of the theatre company Aasakta Kalamanch, established in 2003.

Takalkar has directed more than 45 plays in Marathi, Hindi, Urdu, Kannada, Marwari, and English. He has directed films such as The Bright Day, Medium Spicy, and Toh Ti ani Fuji. He also runs his restaurants Barometer, NIPR Bar, and Godot in Pune.

== Personal life ==
Takalkar met actor Geetanjali Joshi during rehearsals for his first play Yayati. They married in 2005 and later separated in 2007. In 2011, Takalkar was diagnosed with bipolar II disorder, about which he has spoken publicly.

== Career ==
He graduated from the Institute of Hotel Management, Mumbai, and briefly worked in the hospitality industry as a chef, before shifting his focus to the entertainment industry. He then studied animation at the Centre for Development of Advanced Computing.

=== Theatre ===
Takalkar began his theatre career with the Progressive Dramatic Association in Pune. He won Maharashtra State Awards for Best Play and Best Director for Yayati and Nanephek and later for Tu (2007).

In 2003, he co-founded Aasakta Kalamanch. His plays are noted for minimalist staging, technical clarity, and a distinctive visual language. For the company’s repertory, Takalkar directed a series of productions at Sudarshan Rangmanch, an intimate 100-seat theatre in central Pune.

In 2010, he was awarded the Charles Wallace scholarship to pursue a Master's degree in Theatre Practice from the University of Exeter studying under Phillip Zarrilli. This exposure reshaped his artistic practice. Upon returning to India, he directed plays with large ensemble casts including Comrade Kumbhakarna, written by Ramu Ramanathan, for the National School of Drama's repertory company. Deepa Ganesh for the Hindu wrote, “The play, intense and multi-layered, is full of signs and metaphors, weaving into its polyphonic narrative, mythology, politics and life as it were”.

He later directed Uney Purey Shahar Ek his Marathi adaptation of Girish Karnad's English play, Bendakaalu on Toast. Shanta Gokhale for Pune Mirror wrote, “Mohit Takalkar walks with Karnad step for step, giving us a piece of theatre that is memorable as much for its strong conviction as for its refined stage craft”.

In 2015, he directed Main Hoon Yusuf aur ye hai Mera Bhai, a Hindustani translation of Palestinian playwright Amir Nizar Zuabi's English play I am Yusuf and this is my brother. The critically acclaimed production swept five awards at the Mahindra Excellence in Theatre Awards(META), taking top honors including Best Play and Best Director. Critic Shanta Gokhale reviewing for Mumbai Mirror wrote, “Followers of this director’s work are accustomed to seeing a stage design that intrigues the eye. In this case, there was just a table at the beginning and a low white ‘rock’ later, that also served as diverse seating arrangements. As the stories of the characters unfolded, the starkness of the stage became part of the meaning of the play, reflecting the fear, confusion and misery that was invading their lives”. In 2017, Takalkar directed Chaheta, an Urdu adaptation of The Beloved, a play originally written by Zuabi.

Takalkar directed two plays for Aadyam, a theatre initiative by the Aditya Birla Group. One of them, Gajab Kahani, was an adaptation of Jose Saramago’s The Elephant’s journey. Staged in a black box, the production featured a 360 degree performance around the audience, who were seated on swivel chairs at the centre. Takalkar later directed Mosambi Narangi, a Hindi adaptation of Marie Jones' play, Stones in His Pockets. The production features actors Rajit Kapur and Ajeet Singh Palawat in a two hander performance, with each portraying over 20 distinct characters.

In 2020, during the Covid-19 pandemic, Takalkar directed the digital production The Colour of Loss adapted from Booker Prize winning author Han Kang’s novel The White Book. Following the post-pandemic re-opening of theatres, Takalkar devised Hunkaro, a multilingual theatrical production adapted from Asha Amar Dhan a short story by Vijaydan Detha. Deepa Punjani for Mumbai Theatre Guide wrote, “Mohit's directorial sensibilities put the story and the actor first, but the design though not obvious, is palpable. The simplicity belies the more abstract”. At the 2023 Mahindra Excellence of Theatre Awards (META), Hunkaro won seven awards, including best play and best director for Takalkar.

In 2023, Takalkar returned to Marathi theatre after a nine-year hiatus by directing an adaptation of Sam Steiner's, political two-hander Lemons Lemons Lemons Lemons Lemons featuring Lalit Prabhakar in the cast.

Takalkar directed Caryl Churchill’s Love and Information for the National Centre for the Performing Arts (India) in 2024. The play is a compilation of seven sections each with a number of scenes that range from less than a minute in length to a few minutes long. The production was staged in multiple languages including English, Hindi, Marathi, Hariyanvi, and Gujarati.

Next in 2024 he directed The Nether, a sci-fi crime drama set in near future written by American playwright Jennifer Haley.

In November 2025, Takalkar directed the play Anatomy of a Suicide by British playwright Alice Birch for the Prithvi Theatre Festival. The play follows three women, Carol, Anna, and Bonnie, who are revealed over the course of the narrative to be grandmother, mother, and daughter. Their stories unfold simultaneously across different timelines. The production starred Iranian actress Faezeh Jalali, Amba Jhala, and Mallika Singh as Carol, Anna, and Bonnie, respectively. Dipanita Nath for the Indian express writes, “the latest from one of the country's finest directors, Mohit Takalkar, Anatomy of a suicide plays on a stage marked like the game of knots and crosses, conversations from one era enter another, underlining the fluidity of time in generational trauma and the play keeps the audience in its grip, engaged and involved.”

In May 2026, Takalkar directed Dil ka Haal Sune Dilwala, an Indian adaptation of Sarah Ruhl’s play Dead Man’s Cell Phone, produced as part of the Aadyam Theatre initiative in Delhi. The production starred Vrajesh Hirjee, Dilnaz Irani, and Faezeh Jalali. It received mixed reviews, with praise directed toward its live orchestra and modular staging, while criticism focused on its use of cultural stereotypes, pacing, and tonal inconsistency.

=== Films ===
- The Bright Day (2012)
- Chirebandi (2017)
- Occasional Reflection on the contingencies of life (2021)
- Medium Spicy (2022)
- Toh, ti ani Fuji (2024)

In 2012, Takalkar scripted, edited, and directed his debut feature film The Bright Day in Hindi-English which premiered at the Toronto International Film Festival. It was in competition at the Shanghai International Film Festival, Mumbai International Film Festival, and was showcased at the London Indian Film Festival, Vancouver South Asian Film Festival, Calgary International Film Festival, Indian Film Festival -The Hague. It won the Grand Jury Prize and Best Director at the South Asian International Film Festival. The film stars Sarang Sathaye, Radhika Apte, Rajit Kapur, Shernaz Patel and Mohan Agashe. Katherine Matthews for Bollyspice wrote, “The Bright Day occasionally feels staged, the dialogues occasionally stilted, but there is much in Takalkar’s film that is thoughtful, joyous and charming”.

In 2017, he scripted, edited, and directed his debut non-feature in Marathi-English, Chirebandi on the life and works of celebrated Playwright Mahesh Elkunchwar, which was commissioned by the Sahitya Akademi, New Delhi.

In 2019 he went on to direct his debut Marathi feature film, Medium Spicy for Landmarc Films starring Sai Tamhankar, Parna Pethe and Lalit Prabhakar. The film released three years later in June 2022 because of the COVID-19 pandemic. Meenakshi Shedde for Mid-Day wrote, “Takalkar’s film is a nuanced reflection on the unreliable rewards of love and marriage. It is an astute, funny, thoughtful and philosophical film about people like us, with enough romance and romantic songs to make it a rather satisfying indie film that is streets ahead of Bollywood in many ways”. The film was screened at Norway Bollywood Film Festival, Pune International Film Festival, Dhaka International Film Festival, River to River Florence Indian Film Festival and the Stuttgart Indian Film Festival.

In June 2021, soon after the pandemic, Takalkar directed an English language experimental feature film, Occasional Reflection on the contingencies of life shot entirely on an iPhone. It was produced by his home production, Nek Iraada Films and mostly non-actors were cast. However, the film remains unreleased.

In July 2022, it was announced that Takalkar would direct his next Marathi film Toh Ti ani Fuji (Him Her and Fuji) produced by PlatoonOne Films. The film was shot in Pune and Tokyo and stars Lalit Prabhakar and Mrinmayee Godbole which premiered at the Pune International Film Festival where it won the jury mention for Prabhakar and the best screenplay award.

In April 2026, Sony Pictures Networks India acquired the worldwide digital rights for the film, with an exclusive direct-to-digital release on Sony Liv scheduled for 10 April 2026. The film received generally positive reviews for its direction, writing, and performances. Writing for The Hollywood Reporter India, Rahul Desai noted, “The first ten minutes of Mohit Takalkar’s Toh Ti Ani Fuji are intoxicating. They’re right out of a ‘movie’ movie. The filmmaking evokes the kind of incomplete love story in which serendipity—a chance meeting, a second chance—reunites a former couple. The setting encourages a sense of surrender.”

=== Film Editing ===
Takalkar has edited over 20 feature films which include, Cobalt Blue, Soyarik, Kaasav, Astu, Badha, Dithee, Chidiya, Nital, Samhita among others.

=== Acting ===
Takalkar was seen in Anurag Kashyap's Kennedy (film) as a corrupt police commissioner Rasheed Khan. Abhimanyu Mathur of the Hindustan Times writes, "Mohit Takalkar is the other star of the show as the corrupt Police Commissioner. He makes you despise him and love his performance quite effortlessly." Kennedy made its world premiere in the prestigious Midnight Screenings section at the 2023 Cannes Film Festival where it received a rousing seven-minute standing ovation from international audiences.

He played Yadunath Jungle in National Award winning Director, Nikhil Mahajan's Raavsaheb which premiered at the International Film Festival of India. He was seen as Krishnaji Bhaskar in Raja Shivaji (film), the 2026 Indian historical action drama film directed by Riteish Deshmukh, based on the life of Shivaji, the founder of the Maratha Empire.

He has appeared in films like, Godavari, Gho Mala Asla Hava, CRD, Devrai. He has stated that he takes acting roles for enjoyment rather than as a primary pursuit.

== Accolades ==
- Homi Bhabha Fellow 2016–2018
- Shankar Nag Theatre Award for the year 2015
- Best Production and Best Director at the Mahindra Excellence in Theatre Awards for Mein Huun Yusuf Aur Yeh Hai Mera Bhai (2016) and Best Production and Best Director for Hunkaro (2023)
- Ustad Bismillah Khan Yuva Puraskar
- Grand jury prize for Best Director and Best Film for The Bright Day at the New York South Asian Film Festival
- Charles Wallace Scholar 2009-2010
