= Parna Pethe =

Indian actress

- Born: 19 February 1990; Pune, Maharashtra, India
- Education: Masters in Clinical Psychology from Fergusson College Pune
- Occupation: Actress
- Years active: 2009-present
- Spouse: Alok Rajwade (m. 2016)
- Parent(s): Atul Pethe, Rohini Pethe

Parna Pethe is an Indian film & theatre actress who has appeared in many Marathi films and experimental plays.

== Early life ==
Parna was born and raised in Pune. She studied at Abhinava Vidyalaya School and graduated from Fergusson College, Pune. She started acting while she was studying at Fergusson. She has been a Bharatnatyam dancer since she was 8.

== Personal life ==
She dated Alok Rajwade for 6 years before tying the knot, on 29 February 2016. They had a court marriage at Mangal Karyalay, Pune.

== Career ==
Pethe was one of the founding members of Natak Company, in 2008. She was also part of the theatre troupe, Aasakta Kalamanch. In 2014,she appeared in Rama Madhav, in which she played the titular character along with Alok Rajwade. In 2016, she appeared in the movie YZ. She replaced Sakhi Gokhale in the famous play, Amar Photo Studio in 2018. In 2019, she was part of an online short film series, titled Safe Journeys, opposite Suvrat Joshi. She would be seen next in Medium Spicy, directed by Mohit Takalkar. Pethe is also the curator of Kaan Drushti, a series of theatre related talks by Natak Company. In 2022, she started sharing the stage with her father Atul Pethe for the first time in a play called Adlay Ka…? directed by Nipun Dharmadhikari. She played one of four lead characters in celebrated Marathi play Charchaughi directed by Chandrakant Kulkarni, other three being played by Rohini Hattangadi, Mukta Barve and Kadambari Kadam. In 2024, she is performing the role of 'Totto-chan' in a play-reading based on the popular book 'Totto-chan'.

== Filmography ==
=== Films ===
Year	Title	Role	Language	Reference
2009	Vihir	Tayadi	Marathi	
2009	Ek Cup Chya	Vana Sawant	Marathi	
2013	Kaatal	Sampada	Marathi	
2014	Rama Madhav	Ramabai	Marathi	
2016	YZ	Antara	Marathi	
2016	Photocopy	Madhu and Mala Kulkarni	Marathi	
2017	Baghtos Kay Mujra Kar	Shivraj's wife	Marathi	
2017	Faster Fene	Aboli	Marathi	
2018	Take Care Good Night	Sanika	Marathi	
2018	Ashleel Udyog Mitra Mandal	Sana	Marathi	
2019	Kahani Mitra Ki	Nama	Hindi	
2020	Dots	Saira	Hindi	
2022	Medium Spicy	Prajakta Abhyankar	Marathi	
2024	Vishay Hard	Dolly	Marathi	
2025	Jilabi	Rubina	Marathi	
2025	Ata Thambaycha Naay!	Seema Mali	Marathi	

=== Theatre ===
Year	Title	Language	Reference
2013	Aashadhatil Ek Divas	Marathi	
2018	Amar Photo Studio	Marathi	
2022	Adlay Ka...?	Marathi	
2022	Love You	Marathi	
2022	Charchaughi	Marathi	
