= Samhita (film) =

2013 Indian film by Sumitra Bhave–Sunil Sukthankar

- Samhita poster
- Directed by: Sumitra Bhave; Sunil Sukthankar
- Written by: Sumitra Bhave
- Screenplay by: Sumitra Bhave
- Story by: Sumitra Bhave
- Produced by: Mukta Arts; Ashokk Movies
- Starring: Devika Daftardar; Milind Soman; Rajeshwari Sachdev
- Cinematography: Sanjay K. Memane
- Edited by: Mohit Takalkar
- Music by: Shailendra Barve
- Release date: 18 October 2013
- Running time: 127 minutes
- Country: India
- Language: Marathi

Samhita: The Script (or simply Samhita) is a 2013 Indian Marathi film directed by duo Sumitra Bhave—Sunil Sukthankar and produced by Mukta Arts in association with Ashokk Movies. The film stars Devika Daftardar, Milind Soman, and Rajeshwari Sachdev along with Uttara Baokar and Jyoti Subhash in supporting roles. The film had its theatrical release on 18 October 2013 and won several awards including two National Film Awards at the 60th National Film Awards; the Best Female Playback Singer for Arati Ankalikar-Tikekar and the Best Music Direction (Songs) for Shailendra Barve. The director-producer Subhash Ghai, the founder of Mukta Arts, was not initially part of the film and was approached when the director duo faced financial problems.

== Plot ==
Revati Sathe is a National Award winning documentary maker who is approached by producer Shirin Dastane to direct a film based on a short story Darpan – The Mirror written by Tara Deuskar. It was Shirin's husband Dinkar's wish to direct a film on this story but being paralysed since a decade is unable to fulfill his dream. Shirin narrates the story in short to Revati stating that it is a story of a woman's surrender. The story is of king Satyasheel whose step-mother puts him in a wedlock with her niece Maalvika. The king however finds his love in a court singer whose reflection is formed in his soul's mirror and she surrenders to the king in love. Revati accepts the project as a challenge from her routine documentary making and sets to write the script with help of the original writer. Deuskar, the original writer contradicts with Shirin and calls it a story of oppression and begins narration. Darpan starts in 1946 at the palace of the princely state of Herwad where on the occasion of Satyasheel's son's thread ceremony singer Raina-bi from Banaras arrives and presents her singer daughter Bhairavi. Impressed by Bhairavi's soulful singing, Satyasheel falls in love with her. While Maalvika is a feminist and avid reader of English literature, she cares nothing about the increasing closeness of the two. On one occasion, Satyasheel takes Bhairavi on a hunting trip and they spend night together while Maalvika is on Europe trip. The following day Satyasheel also leaves for Europe and Bhairavi assuming it as desertion and leaves to Banaras. Upon return, Satyasheel is heart-broken and loses interest in administration. Years later, he attends a meeting in Mumbai related to the privy purse privileges and accidentally meets Bhairavi and brings her to the palace along with her 7-years old daughter Nisha who has a birthmark on her face just like that of Satyasheel.

In present day, Revati is struggling with a divorce from her husband as she wants to pursue her career, Hemangini is finding it hard to adjust with the daughter of her lover and Shirin lives with a sorrow of not having her own kids for keeping her promise to Dinkar's family after he took her as his wife in his second marriage. All the four ladies, Revati, Hemangini, Shirin, and Deuskar have different endings of the film in their mind. While Shirin's end involves separation of all three characters, Hemangini believes that they all would stay together. Revati brings in different end suggesting that Satyasheel stays with Bhairavi and queen Maalvika on the other hand takes the young Nisha to Europe and looks after her well-being. It is hinted that author Deuskar is Nisha, the real life daughter of Satysheel and Bhairavi. The film ends with Hemangini settling her issues with her lover's daughter, Dinkar dying, and Revati deciding to not divorce Ranveer.

== Cast ==
- Devika Daftardar as writer-director Revati Sathe and Queen Maalvika
- Milind Soman as businessman Ranveer Shinde and King Satyasheel of Herwad
- Rajeshwari Sachdev as actress Hemangini and singer Bhairavi
- Uttara Baokar as writer Tara Deuskar and Satyasheel's step-mother
- Jyoti Subhash as producer Shirin Dastane and Bhairavi's mother singer Raina-bi of Banaras
- Sharad Bhutadia as producer Dinkar Dastane and Maalvika's father
- Ashwini Giri as Revati's sister and Maalvika's widow sister
- Sarang Sathye as editor Darshan and Prince Dhairyasheel

== Soundtrack ==
All music is composed by Shailendra Barve.

No.	Title	Lyrics	Singer(s)	Length
1.	"Alfazon Ko Manzoor Hain"	Sunil Sukthankar	Arati Ankalikar-Tikekar	6:10
2.	"Bhairavi"	–	Arati Ankalikar-Tikekar	1:27
3.	"Palakein Naa Moondon"	Sunil Sukthankar	Arati Ankalikar-Tikekar	5:40
4.	"Loota Do Jaan Yahi Armaan"	Sunil Sukthankar	Arati Ankalikar-Tikekar	3:50
5.	"Pal Pal Beete Din"	Sunil Sukthankar	Arati Ankalikar-Tikekar	1:23
6.	"Kya Yehi Tha Jurm"	Sunil Sukthankar	Arati Ankalikar-Tikekar	4:05
7.	"Baaki Hain Kuch Sawaal"	Sunil Sukthankar	Arati Ankalikar-Tikekar	1:10
8.	"Man Dubhanga"	Sunil Sukthankar	Makarand Deshpande	1:30

== Reception and awards ==
Samhita was released theatrically on 18 October 2013 and received positive reviews for its story, direction, music, and performances. The film received two awards at the 60th National Film Awards; the Best Female Playback Singer for the song "Palakein Naa Moondon" rendered by Arati Ankalikar-Tikekar and the Best Music Direction (Songs) for Shailendra Barve. The citation for the singer reads that the "gifted with an earthy and haunting voice the singer gives ample evidence of her classical moorings, without any instrumental embellishments" whereas the composer was awarded for the "versatile and soulful presentation of songs based on Raagas, backed by Indian instrumentation arranged in a manner that enhances the film". Ankalikar-Tikekar had won this award earlier in 2006 at the 54th National Film Awards for all the songs rendered by her in the Konkani language film Antarnad. Bhave was awarded for the Best Screenplay at the 11th Pune International Film Festival. The film also received four nominations at the 20th Screen Awards but did not win any award. The film won five awards at the first Prabhat Film Awards; Best Actress for Daftardar, Best Sound Recording, Best Make Up, Best Costume, and Best Art direction for Bhave.

The film was Indian Panorama selection of Feature & Non-Feature Films at the 43rd International Film Festival of India. It was screened at 14th Mumbai Film Festival in "India Gold 2012" section and at the 17th International Film Festival of Kerala in the "Indian Cinema Today section" and got a standing ovation at both the film festivals.
