= 48th International Film Festival of India =

Indian film festival in 2017

- Opening film: Beyond the Clouds
- Closing film: Thinking of Him
- Location: Goa, India
- Founded: 1952
- Awards: Golden Peacock Award (BPM (Beats per Minute))
- Festival date: 20–28 November 2017
- Website: iffigoa.org

International Film Festival of India
- 49th 47th

Kiren Rijiju presenting the Silver Peacock Award for the Best Actor (Male) to Nahuel Perez Biscayart for the movie 120 BPM, at the closing ceremony of the 48th International Film Festival of India

The 48th International Film Festival of India was held from 20 to 28 November 2017 in Goa. The theme of this edition was "Celebrating the Future of Cinema" and registrations opened in early October 2017.

Filmmaker Sujoy Ghosh, who was appointed head of the jury of the Indian panorama section, resigned from the position on 14 November after alleging that the Ministry of Information and Broadcasting, that co-organizes the festival, dropped two films S Durga and Nude from screening in the Indian Panorama section, despite being chosen by the jury and without consulting them. Two other members Apurva Asrani and Gyan Correa quit the jury the following day.

== Winners ==
- Golden Peacock (Best Film): BPM (Beats per Minute) by Robin Campillo
- IFFI Best Director Award: Vivian Qu for "Angels Wear White"
- IFFI Best Actor Award (Male): Nahuel Pérez Biscayart for BPM (Beats per Minute)
- IFFI Best Actor Award (Female): Parvathy for Take Off
- IFFI Best Debut Director Award: Kiro Russo for Dark Skull
- Silver Peacock Special Jury Award: Mahesh Narayanan for Take Off

== Special awards ==
- IFFI ICFT UNESCO Gandhi Medal: Film Kshitij A Horizon by Manouj Kadaamh.
- Life Time Achievement Award - Atom Egoyan
- IFFI Indian Film Personality of the Year Award: Amitabh Bachchan

== Juries-mentor ==
=== Indian Panorama ===
==== Feature films ====
- Suresh Heblikar, filmmaker and actor
- Rahul Rawail, film director
- Satarupa Sanyal, film director, producer, actress, poet and social activist
- Gopi Desai, film director and actress
- Nishikant Kamat, filmmaker
- Merlvin Mukhim, actor and film producer
- Nikkhil Advani, Film producer, director and screenwriter
- Hari Viswanath, film director, screenwriter and producer
- Sachin Chatte, film critic
- Ruchi Narain, film director and screenwriter

==== Non-feature films ====
- Sudhir Mishra, film director and screenwriter; President
- Tuhinabha Majumdar, film director and film writer
- Shankhajeet De, filmmaker
- Mithunchandra Chaudhari, film director
- Shiny Jacob Benjamin, film producer, film director and writer
- Tinni Mitra, film editor
- K. G. Suresh, journalist and columnist

== Official selections ==
=== Opening film ===
- Beyond the Clouds

=== Closing film ===
- Thinking of Him

==== BRICS ====
Out of the 30 films that were screened at the second BRICS Film Festival in June 2017 in China, seven award-winning were chosen to be screened.

English title	Original title	Director(s)	Production country
Panfilov's 28 Men	28 панфиловцев / 28 panfilovtsev	Kim Druzhinin, Andrey Shalopa	Russia
Ayanda	Ayanda	Sara Blecher	South Africa
The Second Mother	Que Horas Ela Volta? / When is she coming back?	Anna Muylaert	Brazil
Nise: The Heart of Madness	Nise: O Coração da Loucura	Roberto Berliner	Brazil
Where Has the Time Gone?	Em que tempo vivemos?	Walter Salles, Aleksey Fedorchenko, Madhur Bhandarkar, Jia Zhangke, Jahmil X.T. Qubeka	Brazil, Russia, India, China, South Africa
Soul Mate	Qi Yue Yu An Sheng	Derek Tsang	China
Turtle	Kaasav	Sumitra Bhave, Sunil Sukthankar	India

==== Bond Retrospective ====
Nine James Bond films were chosen to be featured to celebrate "over 50 years of James Bond's legacy".

- Dr. No (1962)
- Goldfinger (1964)
- On Her Majesty's Secret Service (1969)
- The Spy Who Loved Me (1977)
- Octopussy (1983)
- Licence to Kill (1989)
- GoldenEye (1995)
- The World Is Not Enough (1999)
- Skyfall (2012)

== Committees ==
Three committees — Preview, Steering and Technical — were constituted by the Ministry of Information and Broadcasting prior to inviting films for the festival. The Preview Committee, headed by filmmaker Vivek Agnihotri was set up to shortlist films for the festival. Filmmakers Jahnu Barua and Nagesh Kukunoor were named conveners of the Steering and Technical Committees.

=== Steering Committee ===
A Steering Committee was set up composed of noted entertainment industry professionals:

- Jahnu Barua, convener
- Shoojit Sircar
- Shaji N. Karun
- Anand Gandhi
- Piyush Pandey
- Prasoon Joshi
- Siddharth Roy Kapur
- Vani Tripathi Tikoo
- Meren Imchen
- Ashwiny Iyer Tiwari
- Bharat Bala
- Director, National Film Development Corporation of India

=== Film Preview Committee ===
A 40-member Film Preview Committee was set up to "enhance the involvement of the Indian film industry". Its members included:

- Vivek Agnihotri, filmmaker; convener
- Nitesh Tiwari, filmmaker
- Aniruddha Roy Chowdhury, filmmaker
- Bhaskar Hazarika, filmmaker
- Gautami Tadimalla, actress
- Hrishitaa Bhatt, actress
- Pallavi Joshi, actress
- Khalid Mohamed, film critic
- Saibal Chatterjee, film critic
- Bhawana Somaaya, film critic and writer
