= Sumitra Bhave–Sunil Sukthankar =

Indian filmmaker duo

Sumitra Bhave
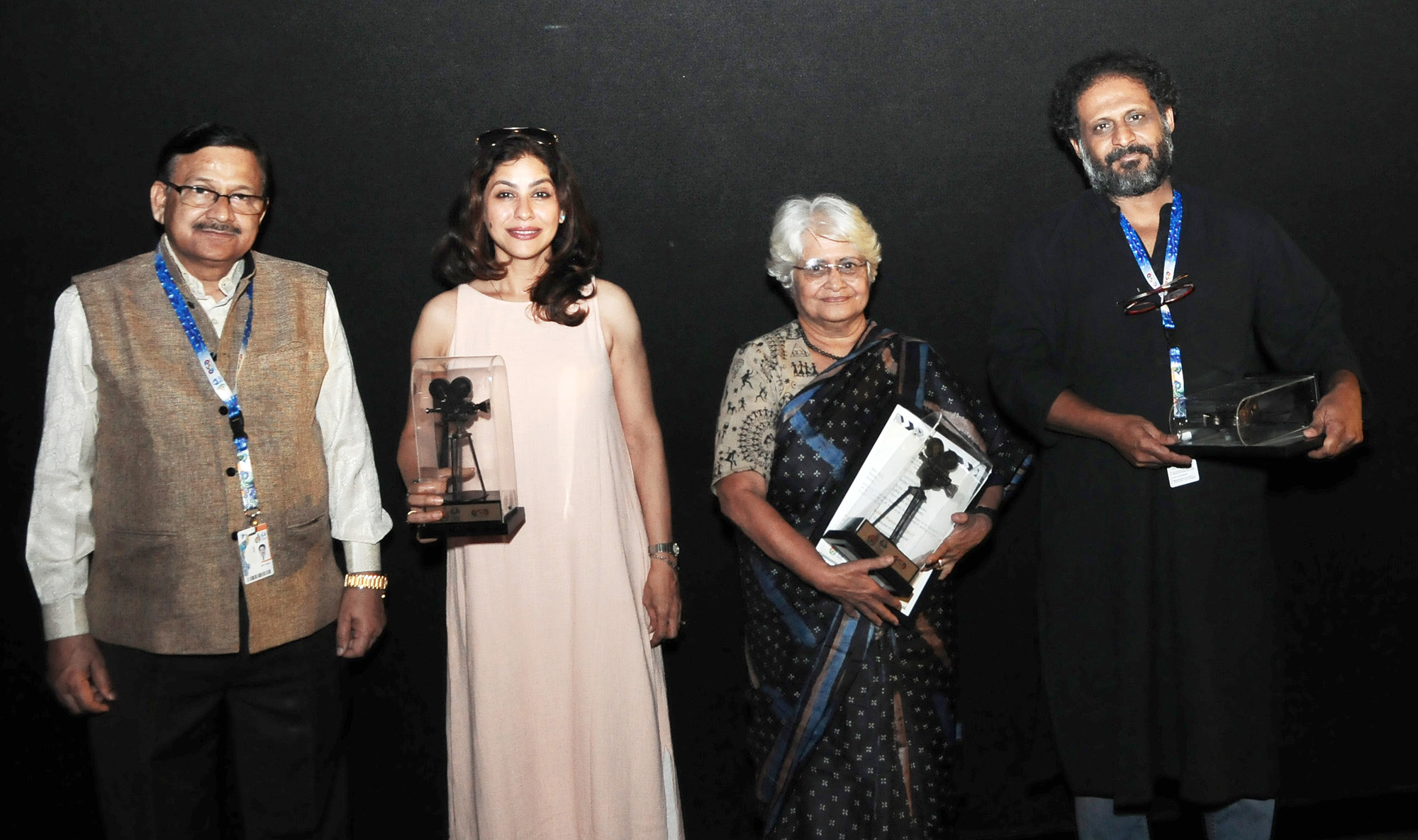
- Bhave, IFFI (2017)
- Born: 12 January 1943; Pune
- Died: 19 April 2021 (aged 78)
- Occupations: Filmmaker, theatre director and producer, screenwriter
- Years active: 1985–2021
- Children: Satee Bhave

Sunil Sukthankar
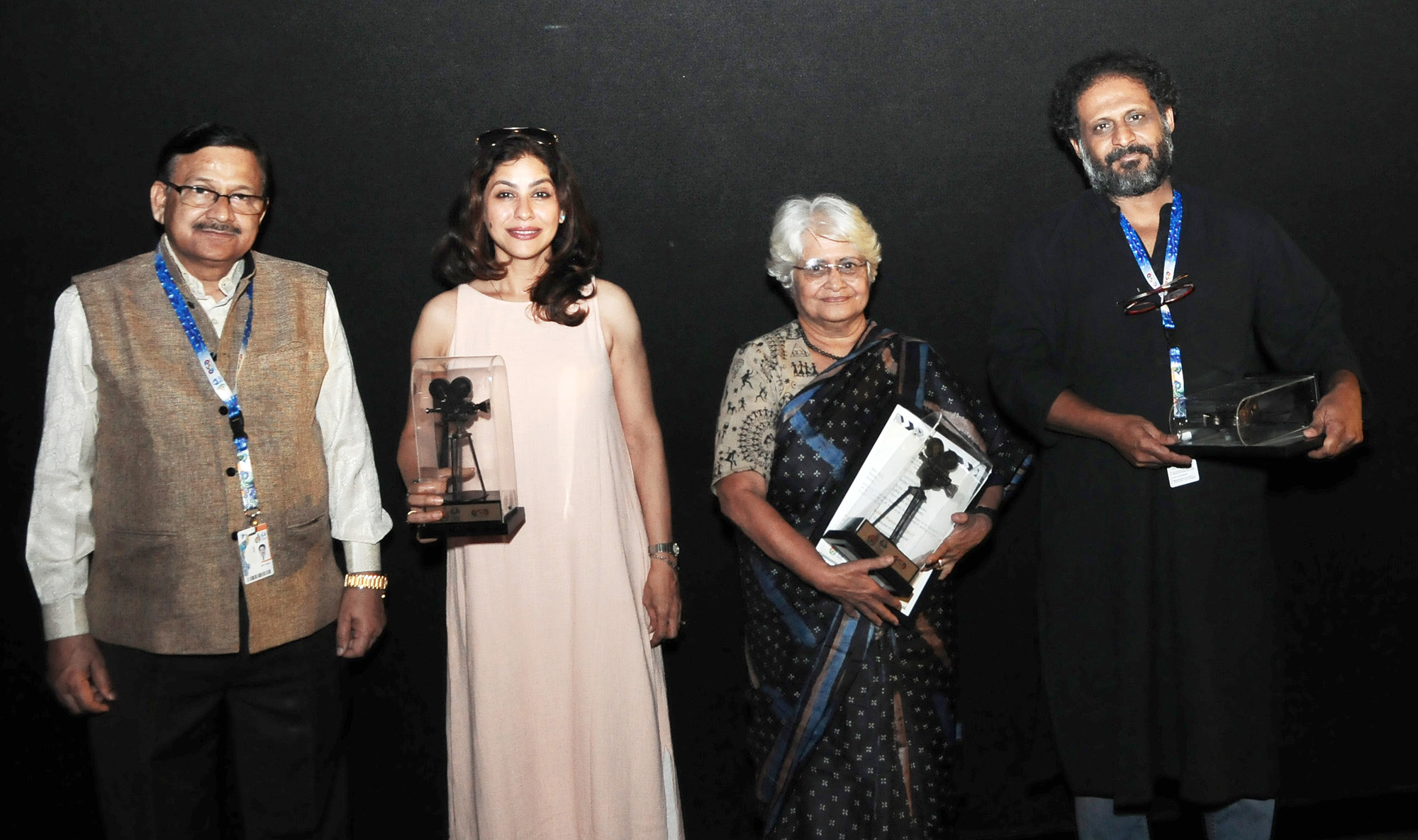
- Sunil Sukthankar, IFFI (2017)
- Born: 31 May 1966 (age 60); Karad
- Occupations: Director, actor, lyricist, writer
- Years active: 1983–present

Sumitra Bhave (12 January 1943 – 19 April 2021) and Sunil Sukthankar (born 31 May 1966) were an Indian filmmaker duo working predominantly in Marathi cinema and Marathi theatre. Bhave and Sukthankar made seventeen feature films, more than fifty short films, and four TV serials; all of these were written by Bhave. Sunil Sukthankar, a Film and Television Institute of India graduate (1989) is also an actor and a lyricist. He has written more than 90 songs for their own and various other Marathi and Hindi films. The duo had won various national and international accolades for the films Doghi (1995), Dahavi Fa (2002), Vastupurush (2002), Devrai (2004), Astu (2016) and Kaasav (2017). At the 64th National Film Awards, their feature film Kaasav won the prestigious President Golden Lotus National Award.

== Personal life ==
=== Sumitra Bhave ===
Bhave was born on 12 January 1943 in Pune. She completed her graduation from Fergusson College, Pune, and received a master's degree in Political and Science Sociology from Pune University. She received another master's degree in Political Science and Sociology and a Diploma in Rural Welfare from the Tata Institute of Social Sciences, Mumbai, and later began her voluntary work for various organisations. She taught at the Karve Institute of Social Service, Pune, for a decade and later worked as a Project Manager for Community Aid and Sponsorship Program, Mumbai. Bhave published various investigation and research papers on the subject. She worked as a Marathi language newsreader with All India Radio, New Delhi.

Bhave had a daughter, who is also a writer. On 6 April 2021, Bhave was admitted to Sahyadri Hospital in Pune for lung infection. She was suffering from Interstitial lung disease which was detected earlier in March 2021. She died on the morning of 19 April 2021 due to respiratory failure and lung fibrosis. At the time of her death, she was working on three films and their scripts.

=== Sunil Sukthankar ===
Sukthankar was born on 31 May 1966 in Karad. He completed his graduation in Commerce from Brihan Maharashtra College of Commerce, Pune and joined the Film and Television Institute of India to pursue a course in film direction. His diploma film was titled Anuttar. As a theatre activist, Sukthankar wrote and directed several plays and street plays.

== Career ==
In 1985, while working as the Director of Research Project for Stree Vani, Bhave made a debut short film Bai (Woman) about a woman from the slums to display her strength to survive adversities. The film, produced by Stree Vani, was well received and went on to win the National Film Award for Best Non-Feature Film on Family Welfare at the 33rd National Film Awards. It was honoured for "its realistic portrayal of poor, oppressed housewife who succeeds in her determined effort to rehabilitate herself and realise her potential to be on her own". Her next short film Paani, made in 1987, also fetched her another National Film Award. The film was adjudged the Best Educational / Motivational / Instructional Film at the 35th National Film Awards. Bhave later made several other short films like Mukti (1990), Chakori (1992), Laha (1994), and Three Faces of Tomorrow. Bhave has received a Chitra Ratna Puraskar and Kamdhenu Award for literary contribution.

After a career as a theatre activist, Sukthankar was introduced to Bhave through her daughter while she was making her debut short film Bai (1985). After completing his graduation and film direction course from the Film and Television Institute of India, he joined Bhave again as an assistant and worked on three short films.

=== Collaboration ===
==== 1995—2009 ====
In 1995, Bhave collaborated with Sukthankar as a director and made their film debut with a Marathi film Doghi (Two Sisters). The film depicts a story about two sisters and their mother caught in rigid and superstitious social structure. The film received wide critical acclaim and won several awards including the Best Film at the 32nd Maharashtra State Film Awards and the Best Film on Other Social Issues at the 43rd National Film Awards. Their next film Zindagi Zindabad (Long live, Life!) was made in Hindi in 1997. The film was based on a real-life story of a teenager who risked his own life to care for a person stigmatised by HIV/AIDS. In 2002, two of the films made by Bhave and Sukthankar, both made in Marathi, Dahavi Fa (10th F) and Vastupurush (Guardian Spirit of the House), were released. The filmmaker duo initially approached the Children's Film Society to produce Dahavi Fa but the organization refused the script for not fitting "into their 'objectives'". The film was finally funded by their friends and was released under the duo's production company "Vichitra Nirmiti". Both films received wide critical acclaim; Vastupurush was awarded the Best Feature Film in Marathi at the 50th National Film Awards, Dahavi Fa was adjudged the Best Film at the 40th Maharashtra State Film Awards, and the duo won the Best Director award. The duo considers Vastupurush as their "important and favourite film".

In 2004, Bhave—Sukthankar made their next Marathi film Devrai (Sacred Grove) on the subject of schizophrenia with Atul Kulkarni and Sonali Kulkarni playing the lead roles. The film was appreciated for its depiction of schizophrenia and performances of its leads, and won several awards upon its release including the Best Film on Environment Conservation / Preservation at the 52nd National Film Awards, Best Film, Best Director, Best Actor, and Best Actress award at the 11th Screen Awards Marathi and the Award for Best Film with Social Message at the 42nd Maharashtra State Film Awards. In 2006, two of Bhave—Sukthankar's Marathi films were released; Badha (Possessed) and Nital (Crystal Clear). While Badha depicts a story of a woman from the shepherd community battling depression due to the "shamans, stigma and superstition" in their community, Nital focuses on the stigma associated with the disease vitiligo in Indian society. Nital was adjudged the Best Film at the 44th Maharashtra State Film Awards, and the duo won the Best Director award. (Note: "Sumitra Bhave and Sunil Sukthankar". Indisches Film Festival.)

In 2007, Bhave—Sukthankar made a short film in Hindi, Bewaqt Barish (Untimely Rain), financed by the European Union and produced by Muktangan Mitra. The film focuses on the issues around HIV/AIDS, sex and sexuality and is based on the Oxford Committee for Famine Relief's work with rural and tribal community in the Rajasthan and Odisha states of India. Two of the duo's Marathi films were released in 2009; Ek Cup Chya (A Cup of Tea) and Gho Mala Asla Hava (This is the Husband I Want). Ek Cup Chya depicts a story of a common man who challenges the Government authorities using the Right to Information Act, 2005, an act of the Parliament of India that gives its citizens the right to access government records. The film was awarded the Third Best Film at the 2009 Maharashtra State Film Awards and Bhave—Sukthankar won the Best Director award. Gho Mala Asla Hava premiered at the Pune International Film Festival and is a comical representation of marital problems. Bhave had initially had plans to make it as a short film. The film marked the debut of actress Radhika Apte, who had previously acted for the theatre.

==== 2010—2021 ====
In 2010, the duo made the Hindi language feature-cum-documentary film Mor Dekhne Jungle Mein (To Look for a Peacock in the Jungle). The film was produced by the BAIF Development Research Foundation and was inspired by their "Wadi" project. It focuses on urban youth involvement in rural development and rehabilitation of tribal families. Bhave—Sukthankar's 2011 Marathi film Ha Bharat Majha (This is My India) depicts the contrast in the Indian society who support the 2011 Indian anti-corruption movement started by activist Anna Hazare but continue to practice small corrupt acts in their daily lives. The film was awarded the Best Marathi Film at the 10th Pune International Film Festival. The duo made a Marathi film in 2013, Samhita (The Script). The film received positive reviews for its story, direction, music, and performances. It received two awards at the 60th National Film Awards, and Bhave was awarded for the Best Screenplay at the 11th Pune International Film Festival. Their next Marathi film, Astu (So Be It), dealt with the subject of Alzheimer's, and is about a Sanskrit scholar who is suffering from it. The film was appreciated for its depiction of the disease and performances of its leads, and won several awards. Bhave won Best Dialogue at the 61st National Film Awards. Though the film was completed in 2013, it did not find any distributor and was released through crowdfunding in 2016.

In 2015, the duo made a short film in Hindi, Phir Zindagi (Life Again) which deals with topic of organ donation. Their upcoming Marathi film Kaasav depicts the issue of depression among youngsters in relation to the life and nesting cycle of olive ridley sea turtles. The film was awarded the Best Feature Film at the 64th National Film Awards. Kaasav (Turtle) became the fifth Marathi film to win in this category. The film was also awarded the Best Film at the 55th Maharashtra State Film Awards.

In 2019, Bhave's next film Dithee premiered at the Pune International Film Festival. Bhave had been working on this film for many years but the project could not start due to lack of producers. Bhave lent her voice to the character of Sindhubai Jadhav in the 2020 film The Disciple directed by Chaitanya Tamhane. The film is about a young aspiring classical singer and Jadhav is a veteran singer of yester-years whose only audio recordings are now available.

== Filmography ==
=== Short films and TV serials ===
Year	Title	Bhave credited as			Sukthankar credited as			Notes	Ref(s)
Year	Title	Director	Writer	Producer	Director	Writer	Producer	Notes	Ref(s)
1985	Bai	Yes	Yes					Short film	
1987	Paani	Yes	Yes	Yes				Short film	
1990	Mukti	Yes	Yes					Short film	
1992	Chakori	Yes	Yes		Yes			Short film	
1994	Laha	Yes	Yes		Yes			Short film	
1997	Three Faces of Tomorrow	Yes	Yes		Yes			Short film	
1999	Gautam's Mother	Yes	Yes		Yes			Short film	
1998–99	Bhains Barabar	Yes	Yes		Yes			TV serial	
2004	Zid	Yes	Yes		Yes			Short film	
2007	Bewaqt Barish	Yes	Yes		Yes			Short film	
2011	Katha Sarita	Yes	Yes		Yes			TV serial	
2014	Majhi Shala	Yes	Yes		Yes			TV serial	
2015	Phir Zindagi	Yes	Yes		Yes			Short film	
	Samvad	Yes	Yes					Short film	
	Ekalavya	Yes	Yes		Yes			Short film	
	Sahyog	Yes	Yes					Short film	
	Sarshi	Yes	Yes					Short film	

=== Feature films ===
- All films are in the Marathi language unless noted otherwise.

Year	Title	Bhave credited as				Sukthankar credited as				Notes	Ref(s)
Year	Title	Director	Writer	Producer	Other	Director	Writer	Producer	Other	Notes	Ref(s)
1995	Doghi	Yes	Yes		• Art director • Costume designer • Editor	Yes			Editor		
1997	Zindagi Zindabad	Yes	Yes			Yes				Hindi film	
2002	Dahavi Fa	Yes	Yes	Yes		Yes		Yes			
2002	Vastupurush	Yes	Yes		Art director	Yes			Editor		
2004	Devrai	Yes	Yes			Yes					
2006	Badha	Yes	Yes			Yes					
2006	Nital	Yes	Yes			Yes					
2009	Ek Cup Chya	Yes	Yes			Yes					
2009	Gho Mala Asla Hava	Yes	Yes			Yes					
2010	Mor Dekhne Jungle Mein	Yes	Yes			Yes				Hindi film	
2012	Ha Bharat Majha	Yes	Yes			Yes					
2013	Samhita	Yes	Yes			Yes					
2016	Astu	Yes	Yes			Yes					
2017	Kaasav	Yes	Yes	Yes		Yes		Yes			
2019	Welcome Home	Yes	Yes			Yes					
2019	Dithee	Yes	Yes	Yes						Not released publicly.	
2020	The Disciple				Voice over						

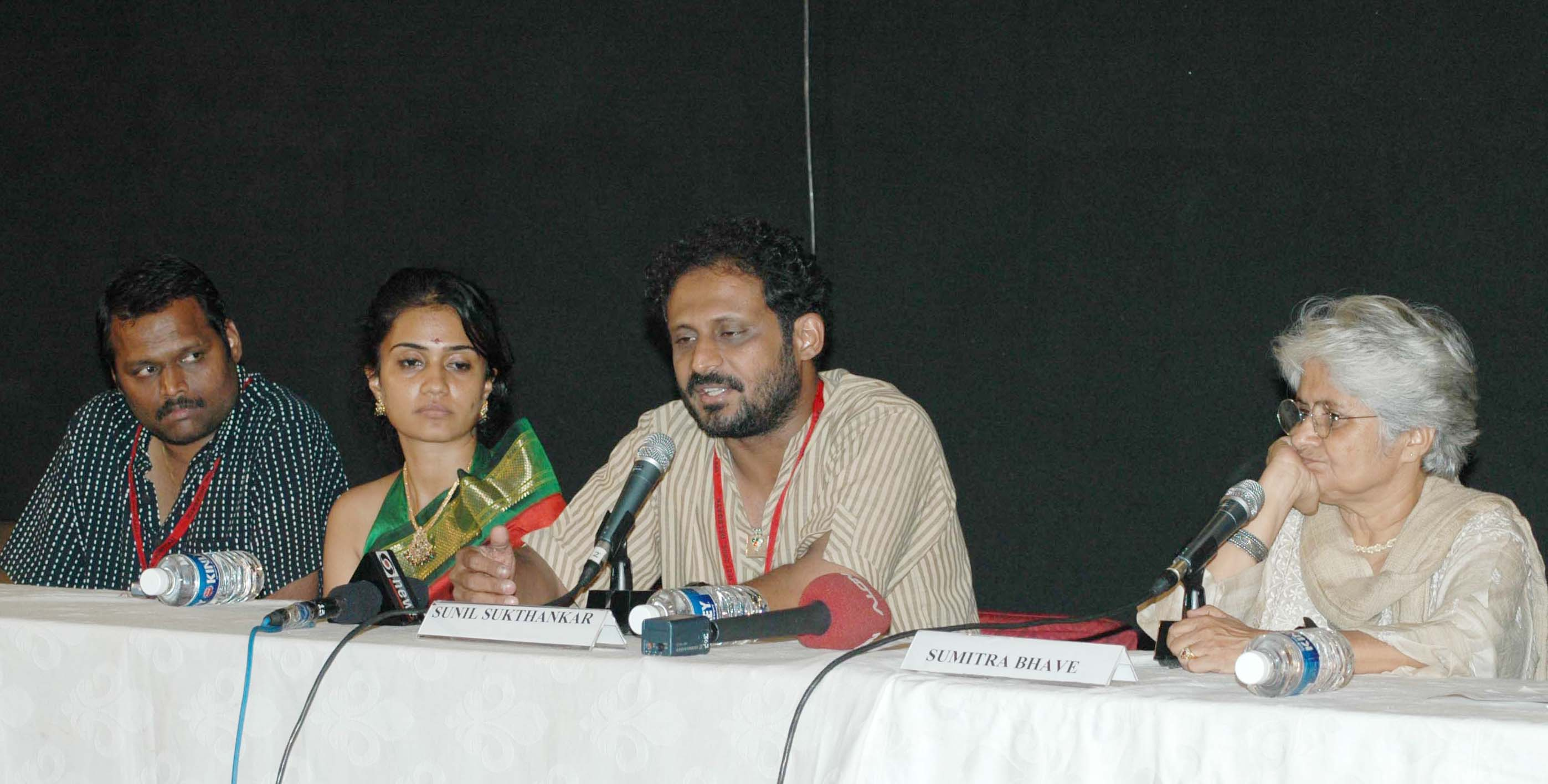
Sunil Sukthankar (second from right) and Sumitra Bhave (first from right), in IFFI, 2006

== Awards ==
Key
#	Indicates an award for Sumitra Bhave

Year	Award	Category	Film	Result	Ref(s)
1985	National Film Awards	Best Non-Feature Film on Family Welfare	Bai	Won#	
1987	National Film Awards	Best Educational / Motivational / Instructional Film	Paani	Won#	
1995	National Film Awards	Best Film on Other Social Issues	Doghi	Won	
1996	Cinema Delle Donne Italy	Grand Jury Prize	Doghi	Won	
1996	Maharashtra State Film Awards	Best Film	Doghi	Won	
1996	Maharashtra State Film Awards	Best Art Director	Doghi	Won#	
1996	Maharashtra State Film Awards	Best Script	Doghi	Won#	
1996	Maharashtra State Film Awards	Best Story	Doghi	Won#	
1996	V. Shantaram Award	2nd Best Film	Doghi	Won	
1996	V. Shantaram Award	2nd Best Director	Doghi	Won	
1996	V. Shantaram Award	Best Film on Other Social Issues	Doghi	Won	
1997	Kalnirnay Award	Best Director	Doghi	Won	
2002	Maharashtra State Film Awards	Best Film	Dahavi Fa	Won	
2006	Maharashtra State Film Awards	Best Director	Dahavi Fa	Won	
2002	Maharashtra State Film Awards	Best Story	Dahavi Fa	Won#	
2002	Maharashtra State Film Awards	Best Story	Vastupurush	Won#	
2002	Maharashtra State Film Awards	Best Dialogue	Vastupurush	Won#	
2002	Maharashtra State Film Awards	Best Screenplay	Vastupurush	Won#	
2002	Maharashtra State Film Awards	Best Lyrics (for the song "Khushi Cheheryavar Majhya")	Dahavi Fa	Won#	
2002	Maharashtra State Film Awards	Best Lyrics	Vastupurush	Won#	
2002	National Film Awards	Best Feature Film in Marathi	Vastupurush	Won	
2004	National Film Awards	Best Film on Environment Conservation / Preservation	Devrai	Won	
2005	Screen Awards Marathi	Best Film	Devrai	Won	
2005	Screen Awards Marathi	Best Director	Devrai	Won	
2006	Maharashtra State Film Awards	Best Film	Nital	Won	
2006	Maharashtra State Film Awards	Best Director	Nital	Won	
2009	Maharashtra State Film Awards	Best Film (Third)	Ek Cup Chya	Won	
2009	Maharashtra State Film Awards	Best Director (Third)	Ek Cup Chya	Won	
2011	Pune International Film Festival	Best Marathi Film	Ha Bharat Majha	Won	
2012	Prabhat Film Awards	Best Costume	Samhita	Won# (Note: Jointly with Geeta Godbole)	
2012	Prabhat Film Awards	Best Art direction	Samhita	Won# (Note: Jointly with Santosh Sankhad)	
2012	Pune International Film Festival	Best Screenplay	Samhita	Won	
2013	Delhi International Film Festival	Best Regional Film	Astu	Won	
2013	Indian Film Festival Stuttgart	Audience Award for Best Film	Astu	Won	
2013	National Film Awards	Best Dialogue	Astu	Won#	
2013	Kolhapur International Film Festival	Audience Award for Best Film	Astu	Won	
2013	Kolhapur International Film Festival	Best Film	Astu	Won	
2013	Kolhapur International Film Festival	Best Direction	Astu	Won	
2013	Kolhapur International Film Festival	Best Screenplay	Astu	Won#	
2014	Marathi International Cinema and Theatre Awards (MICTA)	Best Film	Astu	Nominated	
2014	Marathi International Cinema and Theatre Awards (MICTA)	Best Direction	Astu	Nominated	
2014	Marathi International Cinema and Theatre Awards (MICTA)	Best Art Direction	Astu	Nominated#	
2014	Marathi International Cinema and Theatre Awards (MICTA)	Best Dialogues	Astu	Nominated#	
2014	Marathi International Cinema and Theatre Awards (MICTA)	Best Screenplay	Astu	Nominated#	
2014	Marathi International Cinema and Theatre Awards (MICTA)	Best Story	Astu	Nominated#	
2014	New York Indian Film Festival	Best Film	Astu	Nominated	(Note: "New York Indian Film Festival 2014". New York Indian Film Festival. 10 May 2014.)
2016	National Film Awards	Best Feature Film	Kaasav	Won (Note: Bhave was awarded as director with Sunil Sukthankar and as producer with Sukthankar and Mohan Agashe.)	
2016	Maharashtra State Film Awards	Best Film	Kaasav	Won	
2016	Zee Chitra Gaurav Awards	Best Film	Kaasav	Nominated	
2016	Zee Chitra Gaurav Awards	Best Director	Kaasav	Nominated	
2016	Zee Chitra Gaurav Awards	Best Screenplay	Kaasav	Nominated	
2016	Zee Chitra Gaurav Awards	Best Dialogues	Kaasav	Nominated	
