= Dithee =

2019 Indian Marathi-language drama film

- Directed by: Sumitra Bhave
- Screenplay by: Sumitra Bhave
- Story by: D. B. Mokashi & Sumitra Bhave
- Produced by: Mohan Agashe
- Starring: Kishor Kadam; Mohan Agashe; Amruta Subhash; Dilip Prabhavalkar
- Cinematography: Dhananjay Kulkarni
- Edited by: Mohit Takalkar
- Music by: Parth Umrani; Score: Saket Kanetkar
- Production company: Sumitra Bhave Films
- Distributed by: Sony Liv
- Release dates: September 2019 (Singapore South Asian International Film Festival); 21 May 2021 (India)
- Country: India
- Language: Marathi

Dithee (transl. Seeing) is an Indian Marathi-language drama film written and directed by Sumitra Bhave under her banner Sumitra Bhave Films along with Mohan Agashe. The movie is about a simple ironsmith's journey of undergoing the pain of his son's death and experiencing the non-duality of life and death. The movie was also showcased at the Cannes Film Market in 2019. Dithee also marks the last directorial film of filmmaker Sumitra Bhave.

The film was released on 21 May 2021 as a liv original directly on Sony Liv. It is inspired by the story Aata Amod Sunasi Ale, penned by D.B. Mokashi.

== Cast ==
- Kishor Kadam as Ramji
- Mohan Agashe as Joshibuva
- Dilip Prabhavalkar as Santu
- Uttara Baokar as Santu's wife
- Amruta Subhash as Parubai
- Girish Kulkarni as Govinda
- Shashank Shende as Shiva
- Anjali Patil as Tulsa
- Kailash Waghmare as Kailash
- Onkar Govardhan as Ramji's son

== Synopsis ==
The film tells the story of Ramji, a simple iron-smith from a small village, who is a devotee of Lord Vitthal. For years he followed the Waarkari (a devotional sect) tradition of going on a pilgrimage with thousands of other devotees. One tragic incident and his world comes crashing down. Ramji became not only sad but also angry at God. The story is further built upon how this tragedy affects the family and everyone trying to make sense of the tragedy. One rainy night unfolds a tale of grief and ecstasy - where the seeming opposites just collapse and dissolve into the oneness of being. Life offers Ramji a chance to 'see' the non-duality of birth and death, and make peace with his grief.

== Reception ==
Dithee received appreciation not only from the audience but also from the critics. The Times of India gave a rating of 3.5/5 and stated "Sumitra Bhave’s swansong speaks about the coexistence of life and death". Further, it mentioned, "while the story and acting are strongholds of the film, the cinematography (by Dhananjay Kulkarni) and background score (by Saket Kanetkar) complete the film’s identity".

Firstpost gave a rating of 3.5/5 and stated a positive review of the film: "Sumitra Bhave’s last film delivers an astonishingly relevant view on life and death" and added that the film "delights you with a soulful tale of mourning and celebration all at once".

Subhra Gupta from The Indian Express gave 3 stars and stated "Kishore Kadam’s portrayal of Ramji is at the heart of the film".

SpotboyE gave a rating of 3.5/5 and praised Kishore Kadam's performance "brilliance as a birthright". Cinestaan stated Dithee as a "Visually breathtaking story of loss, grief and healing".

Namrata Joshi of The Hindu states "The film operates more in the realm of ideas than action and takes viewers into the mind of a distressed soul."
