= Jagannath Wani =

Indian-born Canadian statistician

- Born: 10 September 1934; Chikhalwad, Nashik, Maharashtra, India
- Died: 5 May 2017 (aged 82); Calgary, Alberta, Canada
- Education: MSc, PhD
- Alma mater: McGill University, University of Poona, Fergusson College
- Occupations: Professor Emeritus of Statistics and Actuarial science University of Calgary, Alberta, Canada

Jagannath Wani CM (10 September 1934 – 5 May 2017) was an Indian-born Canadian statistician and philanthropist. A Professor Emeritus of Statistics and Actuarial Science at the University of Calgary, his philanthropic work in Canada has focused on mental illness, fund raising for the less fortunate in India and promotion of India's art and culture and multi culturalism in North America. He was conferred the Order of Canada, the highest civilian honour of Canada, on 3 May 2013.

He founded more than 18 organizations in Canada and India in the areas of education, culture, health and mental health. He established an actuarial science program at the University of Calgary in 1983.

== Early life and education ==
Jagannath Wani was born on 10 September 1934 in a village Chikhalwad in the Nashik district of Maharashtra to a Hindu Wani family. He did his schooling in Dhule, a district place in Maharashtra. He was a bright student and secured 9th rank in the merit list amongst 100,000 students and was 1st in the Marathi speaking students in the SSC (matriculation) examination in 1954 from the erstwhile Bombay state. He went on to Fergusson College in Pune to do his bachelor's degree and then to the University of Pune to do his Masters in Statistics. In 1962, he joined McGill University to do his PhD in Mathematical Statistics.

== Social work ==
=== In Canada ===
He founded the Schizophrenia Society of Alberta and raised funds for scholarships and chair for study of schizophrenia at the University of Calgary.

He established the Vedanta Society of Calgary for study of Vedanta philosophy and helped in raising funds for a scholarship for students of Eastern religions at the University of Calgary.

He launched Raga-Mala Music Society of Calgary and later Raga–Mala Performing Arts of Canada to promote music and dance of India in North America through scholarships, concert tours, and lecture demonstrations. He initiated and edited BANSURI Magazine in Canada devoted to classical music and dance of India with a North American perspective. He initiated World Music Course at the University of Calgary to create understanding amongst the students about cultures of various countries and raised funds for the same.

He is the founder president of Maharashtra Seva Samiti Organization (MSSO) for development, relief work and education in India, and served as its President from 1984 to 2009, securing several million dollars in grants from Canadian Government agencies for projects in India and supervised major fund raising for victims of the 1993 Latur earthquake in India.

=== In India ===
He instituted K.S. Wani Memorial Trust by donating all his inheritance for development of less privileged people and completed several projects in the area of education, health and vocational training. Other organizations he promoted in India include K.S. Wani Institute of Advanced Studies in Marathi for research and development of the Marathi language, Schizophrenia Awareness Association (SAA) in Pune for creating awareness about schizophrenia and for supporting self–help groups for families of mentally ill, charity eye hospital for providing free eye care to less privileged and Vishwasetu Association for communication and collaboration between Non Resident Indians and voluntary social organizations in India. He constructed for SAA a centre for rehabilitation of persons afflicted with mental illness, produced awareness movies, and initiated publication of books relating to mental health for Marathi audiences.

He brought social workers like Prakash Amte and Magsaysay awardee Nileema Mishra on to the international platform. He also produced a dozen documentaries to assist social workers such as Prakash Amte, Naseema Hurzuk and Nileema Mishra.

== Books ==
- Probability and Statistical Inference (1971).
- Andharatil Prakashwata (Marathi) (2010).
- Triumphs and Tragedies (2011).

Bin ghadicha dav - an autobiography (बिन घडीचा डाव - आत्मचरित्र)

== Awareness movies ==
- Ek Cup Chya (for awareness regarding the Right to Information Act) in 2009.
- Devrai (for Schizophrenia awareness) in 2004.
- Doctor, Baal Bolat Naahi (for awareness regarding hearing-impaired children) 2003.

== Awards, honours and recognitions ==
- Lifetime Outstanding Achievement Award (2013) - Indo-Canada Chamber of Commerce.
- Order of Canada (2013) - Governor General of Canada.
