= Wani =

Wani may refer to:

- Vani (custom), a child marriage custom in tribal areas of Pakistan
- Wani (dragon), a Japanese dragon translated as "sea monster", "crocodile", or "shark"
- Wani (scholar), a legendary scholar, sent from Korea to Japan during the reign of Emperor Ōjin
- Wani (surname), surname in India (Jammu and Kashmir and Maharashtra)
- Wani (Vidhan Sabha constituency), constituency of the Maharashtra Vidhan Sabha
- Wani Books, Japanese publishing company
- Wani Station, train station in Ōtsu, Shiga, Japan
- Wani, Yavatmal, a city and a municipal council in Yavatmal district in the Indian state of Maharashtra
- Mangifera caesia, wani in Indonesian, an edible fruit related to the mango but with white flesh
- Mangifera odorata, wani in Malay, an edible fruit related to the mango but with a strong turpentine-like smell
- WANI, an American radio station

== People with the name ==
- Altaf Wani, scientist
- Altaf Ahmad Wani (born 1974), Kashmiri politician
- Ashfaq Majeed Wani (1966–1990), Kashmiri separatist
- Augustino Jadalla Wani, South Sudanese politician
- Burhan Wani (1994–2016), commander of a Kashmiri militant group Hizbul Mujahideen
- Ghulam Nabi Wani (1916–1981), politician from Jammu and Kashmir
- Ghulam Qadir Wani (1953–1998), Kashmiri scholar and diplomat
- Jagannath Wani (1934–2017), Indo-Canadian statistician and philanthropist
- Mansukh C. Wani, Indo–American chemist
- Mohan R. Wani (born 1965), Indian cell biologist
- Nasir Aslam Wani (born 1964), Kashmiri politician
- Rangnath Wani, Indian politician from Maharashtra
- Wani Ardy (born 1984), Malaysian writer

== See also ==
- Vani (disambiguation)
- Ouani, a town in the Comoros
