= Vastupurush =

- Vastupurush poster
- Directed by: Sumitra Bhave, Sunil Sukthankar
- Written by: Sumitra Bhave (also dialogue)
- Screenplay by: Sumitra Bhave
- Story by: Sumitra Bhave
- Produced by: NFDC
- Starring: Uttara Baokar, Sadashiv Amrapurkar, Ravindra Mankani, Atul Kulkarni; Mahesh Elkunchwar
- Cinematography: Sanjay Memane
- Edited by: Sunil Sukthankar, Neeraj Voralia
- Music by: Shrirang Umarani, Sunil Sukthankar (lyrics)
- Release date: 2002
- Running time: 154 minutes
- Country: India
- Language: Marathi

Vastupurush: The Guardian Spirit of the House (or simply Vastupurush) is a 2002 Indian Marathi film directed by filmmaker duo Sumitra Bhave–Sunil Sukthankar and produced by National Film Development Corporation of India. It is about Bhaskar, who rises above his poor financial conditions and devotes himself to the poor people for his mother believes that their generations have been cursed by the Vastupurush for doing wrong to people of lower castes. The film won several awards on release including the Best Feature Film in Marathi at the 50th National Film Awards and eight awards at the 40th Maharashtra State Film Awards in 2003.

== Plot ==
Bhaskar Deshpande (played by Mahesh Elkunchwar) has been awarded with the coveted Ramon Magsaysay Award for his dedicated works in preventive medicine in the slums of Mumbai. Bhaskar decides to visit his hometown village after forty years and as he walks through the ruins of his old ancestral house, the events unfold in his memory.

Bhaskar belongs to a Brahmin family settled in a rural village in Maharashtra. His father, Narayan Deshpande (played by Sadashiv Amrapurkar), was a freedom activist during Indian independence movement and is now struggling to accept the corrupt systems present in the post-independent India. Bhaskar's uncle, Madhav, (played by Ravindra Mankani), a widower, hopes to find the hidden treasure he thinks his ancestors must have left behind inside their old house. Bhaskar's elder brother Nishikant (played by Atul Kulkarni) is an amateur poet and was in love with Krishna (played by Renuka Daftardar), a nurse. But his father opposed their marriage since the girl is from Maratha community, different from their own caste.

Saraswati, Bhaskar's mother (played by Uttara Baokar) is a wise woman who has changed herself with the times and accepted the loss of status and riches that entailed the land reform in India, unlike her other family members. She believes that their ancestors had wronged many lower castes and thus the Vastupurush, the guardian spirit of the house, had cursed their generations. She encourages Bhaskar to be a doctor and serve the poor to appease the Vastupurush. Bhaskar, though academically brilliant, struggles to get admission in the medical college due to their poor financial conditions. His mother requests his father to use his influence to the then minister but he refuses to do so as it is against his ethics.

Krishna and Sopana, Bhaskar's friend from lower caste, help Bhaskar's mother fulfill her dream and send Bhaskar to Mumbai for further education. When Bhaskar returns to his village after forty years and decides to build a hospital, he is supported by Sopana who has now become the Chairman of a sugar factory and by Krishna's granddaughter, Kalyani (played by Devika Daftardar), who is also a doctor now.

== Cast ==
- Mahesh Elkunchwar as Bhaskar Deshpande
- Siddharth Daftardar as Young Bhaskar
- Uttara Baokar as Saraswati Deshpande, Bhaskar's mother
- Sadashiv Amrapurkar as Narayan Deshpande, Bhaskar's father
- Ravindra Mankani as Madhav Deshpande, Bhaskar's uncle
- Atul Kulkarni as Nishikant Deshpande, Bhaskar's elder brother
- Renuka Daftardar as Krishna
- Devika Daftardar as Kalyani, Krishna's granddaughter

== Production ==
The story of Vastupurush is inspired by Sumitra Bhave's personal experiences. Bhave belongs to a Brahmin family from a village near Kolhapur in Maharashtra. Her mother suggested Bhave to plot the story of her next cinema based on two of her uncles. Bhave wrote three of the characters played by Uttara Baokar as Bhaskar's mother, Sadashiv Amrapurkar as Bhaskar's father, and Ravindra Mankani as Bhaskar's uncle based on her mother and two uncles respectively. Marathi playwright Mahesh Elkunchwar, who played the lead role of Bhaskar, returned to the screen after twenty-two years with this film. Elkunchwar had earlier played a minor role in Govind Nihalani's Hindi film Aakrosh in 1980.

== Reception and awards ==
Upon release, the film received wide critical acclaim and won several awards. The film is considered to be structured like a novel. Gowri Ramnarayan of The Hindu criticised the films for being too long, "overloaded with messages, unevenly structured, stagily concluded" but also appreciated it for "its sincerity, teamwork in the cast", and "vivid evocation of the past with smells intact". The filmmaker duo Bhave–Sukthankar consider Vastupurush as their "important and favourite film".

The film was awarded the Best Feature Film in Marathi at the 50th National Film Awards "for its competent handling of a feudal family caught in the vortex of social change in post-independence India". The film won eight awards at the 40th Maharashtra State Film Awards in 2003. It was presented the award for Best Actor, Best Actress, Best Supporting Actor, Best Supporting Actress, Best Story, Best Screenplay, Best Dialogue, and Best Lyrics.
