= Palyad =

Indian film

- Theatrical release poster
- Directed by: Shailesh Bhimrao Dupare
- Screenplay by: Sudarshan Khadangale; Shailesh Bhimrao Dupare
- Story by: Sudarshan Khadangale
- Produced by: Pawan Sadamwar; Suraj Sadamwar; Mangesh Dupare; Pranoti Panchal; Shailesh Bhimrao Dupare
- Starring: Shashank Shende; Devika Daftardar; Ruchit Ninave; Gajesh Kamble
- Cinematography: Mohar Mate
- Edited by: Manish Shirke
- Music by: Sam A. R. Jagdish Gomila; Tushar Pargaonkar
- Production companies: Elevate Films; Lavanyapriya Arts
- Distributed by: K Sera Sera
- Release date: 4 November 2022
- Running time: 127 minutes
- Country: India
- Language: Marathi

Palyad (transl. The Other Side) is a 2022 Indian Marathi-language film directed by Shailesh Bhimrao Dupare in his directorial debut, from a story by Sudarshan Khadangale who co wrote the dialogues with Dupare. It was jointly produced by Elevate Films and Lavanyapriya Arts, stars Shashank Shende, Devika Daftardar, Ruchit Ninave, Gajesh Kamble.

== Plot ==
The movie follows the journey of a grandfather, his widowed daughter-in-law, and her young son. While the mother and child wish for the boy to receive an education, the grandfather insists on him adhering to family tradition as a "Smashan Jogi" – someone who assists in funeral rites. Education is not only discouraged by their family but also frowned upon by the community and villagers. The film delves into a conflict that revolves around societal norms and primarily explores the grandfather's internal struggle.

== Cast ==
- Shashank Shende as Mahadu
- Devika Daftardar as Lakshmi
- Ruchit Ninave as Shambhu
- Devendra Dodke as Sarpanch
- Vira Sathidar as Tukaram Buva
- Sailee Dethe as teacher
- Gajesh Kamble as blind man
- Prasad Dhakulkar as Muslim ragman
- Vishal Hajban as Ghargadi
- Babita Uike
- Ravi Dhakate
- Sachin Giri
- Shubham Ugale as village boy
- Sameer Virutkar as village boy

== Production ==
The film is about a tradition of last rites practiced in the border areas between Tamil Nadu and Maharashtra. Initially planned as a short film, its potential led to its development into a full-length feature film.

The production of the film faced numerous challenges and setbacks. Despite receiving positive feedback from 70 to 80 individuals who heard the story, securing financial support proved difficult. However, two brothers from the director's hometown of Chandrapur, recognized the film's significance in addressing critical social issues such as education and combating superstitions. They generously provided the funding needed to proceed with the project.

Shortly after filming commenced, the COVID-19 pandemic brought all production activities to a sudden halt in March 2020. This necessitated significant adjustments, including relocating major editing and post-production tasks to the director's residence. This move ensured continuity and enabled effective financial management amidst the challenges posed by the pandemic.

== Release ==
=== Theatrical ===
The film was released on 4 November 2022 in theatres throughout Maharashtra.

=== Marketing ===
The teaser was released on 6 October 2022.

== Reception ==
=== Critical reception ===
Film Information wrote "Palyad is a fairly different film but it is too class-appealing to make a mark at the turnstiles." Sunder M of The Times of Bollywood appreciate the performances of Ruchit Ninave, Shashank Shende and Devika Daftardar, he said it is "mind-blowing".

=== Awards and nominations ===
The film won various awards at the Gangtok International Film Festival, Sikkim, Ambernath Marathi Film Festival, Mumbai, New Delhi Film Festival, Black Swan International Film Festival, Kolkata, Konkan Marathi Film Festival. The film was also an official selection at Cinequest VR and Film Festival USA, International Film Festival of South Asia Toronto, Calella Film Festival Spain, International Cosmopolitan Film Festival Tokyo, Asia Art Film Festival Hong Kong, Byden International Film Festival Sweden and Richmond International Film Festival USA.
