= Vani (given name) =

Hindi name

- Gender: Female
- Language: Hindi language Sanskrit

Origin
- Meaning: Eloquent in words
- Region of origin: India

Other names
- Alternative spelling: Vaani

Vani is a Hindu/Sanskrit Indian feminine given name, which comes from the name of the Goddess Saraswati. The name means 'eloquent in words'. Alternative spelling includes Vaani.

== Notable people with the name ==
- Vani (writer) (born 1912), Kannada writer
- Vani Bhojan (born 1988), Indian film actress
- Vani Ganapathy, Indian classical dancer
- Vani Hari (born 1979), American blogger
- Vani Harikrishna, Indian film playback singer and music director
- Vani Jairam (born 1945), Indian singer
- Vaani Kapoor (born 1988), Indian film actress
- Vani Kapoor, Indian golfer
- Vani Kola, a venture capitalist
- Vani Sri (born 1948), Indian actress and politician
- Vani Tripathi (born 1979), Indian actress and politician
- Vani Viswanath born (1971), Indian actress and politician
