= Nileema Mishra =

Indian social worker

- Notable work: Founder of Bhagini Nivedita Gramin Vigyan Niketan
- Awards: Ramon Magsaysay Award 2011

Nileema Mishra is a social worker from the Indian state of Maharashtra. She received the Ramon Magsaysay Award for Emergent Leadership in 2011. Nileema was born into a lower-middle-class family in 1972 in the village of Bahadarpur Taluka Parola, Maharashtra, District- Jalgaon, Maharashtra. She is a postgraduate in psychology from the University of Pune. After her education, she worked with Vigyan Ashram, Pabal under the guidance of Dr Kalbagh. She registered Bhagini Nivedita Gramin Vigyan Niketan formally in the year 2005 with the help of Dr Jagannath Wani. Nileema has association with Caring Friends, Mumbai and Let's Dream foundation, Delhi. She donated her award money to her Bhagini Nivedita Gramin Vigyan Niketan, which helps poor women through micro-financing. She was awarded Padma Shri in 2013 for social work.
