= Iravati Harshe Mayadev =

Indian television actress

- Born: 1972 (age 53–54)
- Occupations: Actor, dubbing artist
- Years active: 1994–present
- Spouse(s): Yatin Karyekar (divorced); Capt. Rohit Mayadev
- Children: Devika and Isha

Iravati Harshe Mayadev is an Indian actress and dubbing artist. She has worked in many television serials and is a trained Bharatanatyam dancer.

== Filmography ==
Year	Film	Role	Language
1999	Split Wide Open		English
2002	Hey Ram	Nafisa	Tamil; Hindi
2002	Shararat	Gajanan's Daughter-in-law	Hindi
2005	Kuchh Meetha Ho Jaye	Vibha Wadhwa	Hindi
2008	Mithya	Revati	Hindi
2009	Raat Gayi, Baat Gayi?	Mitali R. Kapoor	Hindi
2010	We Are Family	Rati Malhotra	Hindi
2010	Mittal v/s Mittal	Ramola	Hindi
2011	Kaccha Limboo		Hindi
2011	Michael	Mrs. D'costa	Hindi
2012	Hate Story	Archana Jaidev Singh	Hindi
2013	Monsoon Shootout	DCP Nishi	Hindi
2014	Gandhi of the Month		English
2015	Astu	Ira	Marathi
2017	Kaasav	Janaki	Marathi
2017	Dear Maya	Anna's Mother	Hindi
2018	Simmba	Gayatri Devi	Hindi
2018	Aapla Manus	Bhakti Rahul Gokhale	Marathi
2018	Take Care Good Night	Asavari	Marathi
2019	Bhai: Vyakti Ki Valli	Sunita Deshpande	Marathi
2019	Dhappa		Marathi
2022	Tadka	Urmi	Hindi
2022	Shamshera	Shamshera's wife, Balli's mother	Hindi
2024	Article 370	Bindra Kaul	Hindi
2024	Sarfira	Chitra	Hindi
2026	Chand Mera Dil	Aarav's Mother	Hindi

== Television ==
Year	Serial	Role
1994	Shanti	Nidhi Mahadevan
1994	Surabhi	
1997	Kabhie Kabhie	Mandira Joshi
1997	Saturday Suspense	
1998	X Zone	Surabhi
1998	Rishtey	
1997	Mrityudand	
1999	Tanha	Rukhsana
1999	Waaris	
1999	Chota Muh Aur Badi Baat	Amruta
2001	Ankahee	Anjali Mathur
2002	Achanak 37 Saal Baad	Sheela
2002–2005	Sanjivani	Dr. Smriti Malhotra
2004	K. Street Pali Hill	Ishita Khandelwal
2007	Dill Mill Gayye	Dr. Smriti Shashank Gupta
2023	Scam 2003	DCP Malti Halani
2025	Search: The Naina Murder Case	Payal

== Dubbing ==
- French version of Dil To Pagal Hai, voice of Madhuri Dixit
- Hindi version of Golden Compass, voice of Nicole Kidman

== Awards ==
- Critics Award Best Actress - Filmfare Awards Marathi 2017 for the film Kaasav
- Won Best Actress for Kaasav in Zee Chitra Gaurav Awards 2017
- Nominated for Best Actress Filmfare Awards Marathi for Astu
- Nominated for Best Actress in a Leading Role for Ankahee at 1st Indian Telly Awards
- Won Maharashtra State Film Award for Best Actress for film kaasav.
