= Aapla Manus =

- Theatrical release poster
- Directed by: Satish Rajwade
- Screenplay by: Dr. Vivek Bele
- Story by: Dr. Vivek Bele
- Based on: Katkon Trikon by Dr. Vivek Bele
- Produced by: Ajay Devgn; Nana Patekar; Abhinav Shukla; Manish Mishra; Rohit Choudhary
- Starring: Nana Patekar; Iravati Harshe; Sumeet Raghavan
- Cinematography: Suhas Gujrati
- Edited by: Rahul Bhatnakar
- Music by: Sameer Phaterpekar
- Production companies: Ajay Devgn FFilms; Watergate Production; Shree Gajanan Chitra
- Distributed by: Viacom 18 Motion Pictures
- Release date: 9 February 2018
- Running time: 138 minutes
- Country: India
- Language: Marathi
- Box office: est. ₹25 crore

Aapla Manus (English: Our Man) is a 2018 Indian Marathi language mystery film directed by Satish Rajwade and produced by Ajay Devgn and Abhinav Shukla. A film adaptation of the Marathi play Katkon Trikon by Dr Vivek Bele, the film stars Nana Patekar, Iravati Harshe and Sumeet Raghavan and is Devgn's first Marathi film as a producer. It was released on 9 February 2018. Devgn announced the film via his Twitter handle on 24 December.

== Plot ==
Aapla Manus is a story of a young couple Bhakti & Rahul, living in an urban area. The couple lives with Rahul's father Aaba. Rahul is a lawyer & Bhakti is a college professor. Rahul's partner in the law firm Nitin is also his good friend

One day late at night, Aaba falls off their balcony & admitted to the hospital. Inspector Nagargoje, who looks very similar to Aaba & of the same age, comes to question Rahul. Rahul narrates him about the bickering relationship between his father & wife. As a consequence, their son Nishu is sent to boarding school so that he is not affected by this. 2 days before the incident, they have a short two-day trip to Lonavala, which Bhakti leaves halfway & the two return the next day.

Nagargoje accuses both of them for abetment to suicide. He provides evidence that Aaba has committed suicide, which both deny. Later they get a call from the hospital stating that Aaba has recovered from a Comatose state; however, he is still unconscious. Later Rahul tells Bhakti that he had a showdown at Lonavala with Aaba & that could have triggered his suicide. Nagargoje calls them to his home late at night & tells them it is not a suicide case. Both are enraged at him for causing such mental agony, however, since they cannot do anything, they leave peacefully. The next day Nagargoje meets Rahul at the court & puts a seed of suspicion that his wife has attempted to kill Aaba. Rahul wants to test his theory & brings him home. Nagargoje confronts Bhakti with evidence & finally, she breaks downs. Rahul tries to defend her; however, she confesses that she has attempted to kill Aaba with the help of Nitin.

Later Rahul visits Nagargoje & tries to convince him to drop charges. He tells him that the only way to save his wife is he has to confess to the crime & he would plead for lenient punishment in court. When he returns home, Bhakti tells Rahul that Nagargoje had visited her earlier in the day & told her that he suspects Rahul has tried to kill his father. To bring about the truth, she & Nitin should play along with him, confess that she attempted to kill Aaba & then Rahul would narrate the truth in a bid to save her.

The next day Nagargoje comes with an arrest warrant for Rahul & provides new pieces of evidence (which he had ignored earlier) to prove that he has attempted to kill Aaba. Rahul is arrested & later bailed out by Nitin. After a few days, they receive a letter from Aaba, a suicide note. Nagargoje later tells them that note or the signature did not match Aaba's handwriting.

Later Aaba regains consciousness & narrates the whole incident which was a plain accident & everyone is relieved. When they meet Nagargoje, they have a lengthy discussion on eroding emotional bonding between parents & children. Both of them realize their mistake & ask forgiveness from Nagargoje & Aaba.

The film ends with estranged Nagargoje's son visiting him (apparently after a long time) as he is on his way to perform his last rites before his death (assuming his son won't be there to perform his last rites)

== Cast ==
- Nana Patekar as Inspector Maruti Nagargoje/Abba Gokhale
- Iravati Harshe as Bhakti Rahul Gokhale
- Sumeet Raghavan as Rahul Gokhale
- Savita Malpekar as Vitamin
- Aashish Kulkarni as Nitin
- Shriram Kolhatkar as Bhakti's father
- Ila Bhate as Bhakti's mother
- Ajay Devgn as Vishwas (special appearance)

== Box office ==
Aapla Manus was successful both critically and commercially. It grossed more than ₹20 crore in 50 days and completed theatrical run with collection of ₹25 crore at the box office. The film was later made in Gujarati titled Dear Father.
