= Take Care Good Night =

- Theatrical Release Poster
- Directed by: Girish Joshi
- Produced by: Mahesh Manjrekar; Himanshu Patil
- Starring: Sachin Khedekar; Iravati Harshe; Adinath Kothare; Parna Pethe; Mahesh Manjrekar; Adinath Kothare
- Cinematography: Arjun Sorte
- Edited by: Satish Padwal
- Music by: Narendra Bhide
- Release date: 31 August 2018
- Country: India
- Language: Marathi

Take Care Good Night is an Indian Marathi language film directed by Girish Joshi. The film stars Sachin Khedekar, Iravati Harshe, Adinath Kothare, Parna Pethe and Mahesh Manjrekar. The film's music is composed by Narendra Bhide. The film was released on 31 August 2018.

== Synopsis ==
An innocent metropolitan family decides to fight against a cybercriminal who threatens their reputation by stealing money and revealing sensitive images.

== Cast ==
- Sachin Khedekar as Avinash Pathak
- Iravati Harshe as Asavari
- Adinath Kothare as Gautam
- Parna Pethe as Sanika
- Mahesh Manjrekar as Inspector Pawar

== Soundtrack ==
Take Care Good Night

Soundtrack album by Narendra Bhide
- Released: 2018
- Recorded: 2018
- Genre: Feature film soundtrack
- Length: 3:13
- Language: Marathi

Official audio
- Take Care Good Night – Full Album on YouTube

Track listing
No.	Title	Singer(s)	Length
1.	"Take Care Good Night (Title)"	Jasraj Joshi, Yash Gokhale, Pranjali Barve	3:13
Total length:			3:13

== Critical reception ==
Take Care Good Night received Positive reviews from critics. A Reviewer of Divya Marathi gave the film 3 stars out of 5 and says "Take Care Good Night is very poignantly portrayed in the movie which borrows words from the mobile language of today's young generation". Reshma Rikwar of Loksatta wrote "The film perfectly conveys the message that he should take care of himself so that we don't get hit by anything today". A Reviewer of ABP Majha gave the film 3 stars out of 5 and wrote "Sachin Khedekar, Irawati Harshe, Parn Pethe, Mahesh Manjrekar, Vidyadhar Joshi have all acted with understanding. Moreover, the interrelationships are also well highlighted in this". Keyur Seta of Cinestaan.com gave the film 3 stars out of 5 and wrote "Adinath Kothare shines in what is his biggest role till date. He doesn’t act like the typical villain and switches to innocent guy at times. Iravati Harshe is yet again a reliable supporting force. And this is one of Mahesh Manjrekar’s finest acts as he effortlessly slips into an unusual character". Ganesh Matkari of Pune Mirror says "And yet, I can’t help feeling that the film could have been a bit more complex, a bit more ambitious. In spite of its many positives, it just doesn’t aim high enough". Madhura Nerurkar of News18 India wrote "Teke Care Good Night tells the story of cyber crime. If you want to see where we are in terms of technology in an entertaining way, you can watch Tech Care Good Night movie". Prajakta Chitnis of Lokmat wrote "The premise of the film is very interesting. But the second half does not seem to have come together as much. But still this movie definitely entertains". Ibrahim Afgan of Maharashtra Times wrote "Sachin Khedekar's work is excellent. Mahesh Manjrekar's character is likeable. Parn Pethe has played the role in moderation. It would have been a better film if the writing had been more focused and researched more realistically".
