= Medium Spicy =

- Theatrical release poster
- Directed by: Mohit Takalkar
- Produced by: Vidhi Kasliwal
- Starring: Lalit Prabhakar; Sai Tamhankar; Parna Pethe
- Cinematography: Raghav Ramadoss; Rahul Chauhan
- Edited by: Mohit Takalkar
- Music by: Hrishikesh; Saurabh; Jasraj
- Production company: Landmarc Films
- Release date: 17 June 2022
- Country: India
- Language: Marathi

Medium Spicy is an Indian Marathi language film directed by Mohit Takalkar and produced by Vidhi Kasliwal under the banner of Landmarc Films, starring Lalit Prabhakar, Sai Tamhankar and Parna Pethe. Music by Saurabh Bhalerao, Hrishikesh Datar and Jasraj Joshi. It was theatrically released on 17 June 2022.

== Plot ==
This is the story of Nissim (Lalit Prabhakar) who is a chef by profession and is introvert in nature. How he deals with complex emotions and goes ahead in life with struggling relationships around him binds the crux of the story.

At first we see, Nissim was in a close relationship with Krushna (Spruha Joshi) in his college days and for some reason it did not work. In the college reunion, she whole heartedly expresses that she regrets the separation till date. Nissim on the other hand is fond of her but is not in love with her anymore.

In his restaurant there is a colleague named Prajakta (Parna Pethe) who everyone has a crush on, including Nissim. Due to his introvert nature, he does not express his feelings. The other staff includes head chef Gowri (Sai Tamhankar) and Chef Shubhankar (Sagar Deshmukh) who are non maharashtrians.

One fine day, Nissim sees Gowri in parking with some guy (Sarang Sathye) who is talking to her or seems like fighting. He approaches Gowri later asking what the problem was and her carefree nature attracts him. They grew close to each other in their interactions. It is actually Gowri who pushes Nissim to take Prajakta out insisting that Prajakta also likes him back.

On the date, Prajakta makes him feel guilty of not talking about his feeling sooner and tell him that she is getting married. Devastated Nissim still does not express his ever liked her.

His family has some tension about his aunt and his mother keeps on ranting about it every now and then. His father however is a very sorted man and beautifully finds a way out to love his mother and tolerate her for the rest of his life. Nissim often wonders how this works and one fine day his father tells him that his mother manages to surprise him till date and that keeps the relationship intact.

Gowri starts to feel affection between her and Nissim. She asks him if he wants to sleep with her and he denies. But then he is trying to express his affection by kissing, she slaps him. Nissim feels guilty of this and wants to talk it out but Gowri stops talking to him suddenly.

With Prajakta getting married and Gowri not talking to him at all, Nissim becomes lonely and starts wondering what went wrong. Him not expressing or expressing it out at all. Gowri takes a long leave and Nissim takes charge of the restaurant.

In the meantime, he uploads his profile on a matrimonial site and instantly gets a response from a girl (Radhika Apte ) who likes the profile just because he is planning to move to Paris and is way ahead in concluding the life with her preplanned notions. Nissim finds this confusing and does not take this ahead of this one date.

Chef Shubhankar who is a fried of Nissim and a coworker is struggling in his personal life. His wife has left him along with his kids because of his love for the job and not being available for family for the birthdays or any celebrations. Nissim meets his wife up and tells her to opt for divorce considering they cannot burden each other with their expectations. But later she goes back to Shubhankar and convinces him to leave restaurant job for opening his own at Indore, MP.

Later one day he sees Gowri and simply follows her for an entire day. Everything she does, surprises him. He begins to realise he has a soft spot for her and there is an unknown feeling that draws him towards her.

His parents, despite fighting over the aunt comes to terms with it and find a way in between. This surprises Nissim and he remembers what his father told him. He visits his aunt and talks to her about her difficulties and realises no matter what, she is happy as she followed her heart despite all the reservations society had about her live in relationship with a Muslim guy.

In the end, he goes to Gowri and shows his affection through actions. They have their sweet Romio Juliet moment through balcony. And the film ends in that note.

== Cast ==
- Lalit Prabhakar as Nissim Tipnis
- Sai Tamhankar as Chef Gowri
- Parna Pethe as Prajakta
- Ravindra Mankani as Nissim's father
- Neena Kulkarni as Nissim' mother
- Neha Joshi as Nissim's sister
- Sagar Deshmukh as Chef Shubhankar
- Pushkaraj Chirputkar as Nissim's brother in law
- Arundathi Nag as Nissim's aunt and author
- Spruha Joshi as Krushna

== Production ==
Principal photography began on 21 May 2019, as informed by the makers. On 22 October 2019, entire shooting of the film has been wrapped up.

== Soundtrack ==
Medium Spicy

Soundtrack album by Hrishikesh - Saurabh - Jasraj
- Released: 2022
- Recorded: 2022
- Genre: Feature film soundtrack
- Length: 9:01
- Language: Marathi

Official audio
- Medium Spicy – Full Album on YouTube

Track listing
| No. | Title | Singer(s) | Length |
|---|---|---|---|
| 1. | "Chaal Ka Badaleli" | Abhay Jodhpurkar | 3:40 |
| 2. | "Ka Pahije" | Jasraj Joshi | 5:21 |
| Total length: | | | 9:01 |

== Reception ==
=== Critical reception ===
Medium Spicy film received mixed reviews from critics. Payal Shekhar Naik of Hindustan Times wrote "However, the grip of the actors on the boring story remains tight. And that is the best part of the movie". A Reviewer of Lokmat says "A must watch film for its attempt at a commentary on relationships by bringing characters of different temperaments together and for the excellent performances of the actors". Manisha Lakhe of Ott Play gave the film 3 stars out of 5 and wrote "Marathi cinema has raised expectations by gems like, Court, Killa, and even, The Disciple,. This film is not your usual Rom-Com in the kitchen, and neither is it high Drama of the Ginsu knife, but it’s like the title: medium spicy, comfort food of the soul". Jaydeep Pathak of Maharashtra Times gave the film 3 stars out of 5 and wrote "In short, a 'medium spicy' dish moves in a 'medium' rhythm. She is definitely delicious. However, the whole game depends on developing a 'taste' for it". A Reviewer of Pune Mirror gave the film 4 stars out of 5 and says "‘Medium Spicy’ is a film that proves the saying ‘golden days of Marathi cinema are back.’ It handles an essential and complex topic in a beautiful way".
