= Aathvani =

- Theatrical release poster
- Directed by: Siddhant. A. Sawant
- Screenplay by: Siddhant. A. Sawant
- Story by: Siddhant. A. Sawant; Vidhi Sawant
- Produced by: Siddhant. A. Sawant; Ashok Sawant; Deepak Pandey
- Starring: Mohan Agashe; Suhas Joshi; Suhrud Wardekar; Vaishnavi Karmarkar
- Cinematography: Dhruv Desai
- Edited by: Siddhant. A. Sawant
- Music by: Suhit Abhyankar
- Production company: Minash Productions
- Distributed by: August Entertainment
- Release date: 7 July 2023
- Country: India
- Language: Marathi

Aathvani (transl. Memories) is a 2023 Indian Marathi-language drama film co-produced and directed by Siddhant A. Sawant, under the banner of Minash Productions. It stars Mohan Agashe, Suhas Joshi, Suhrud Wardekar and Vaishnavi Karmarkar. The film was theatrically released on 7 July 2023.

== Plot ==
Successful television writer Rahul Jadhav, who is experiencing writer's block, embarks on a quest to compose a tale about a long-lost farewell letter that a female lover (Sunanda) wrote to her male lover (Rama) 48 years ago. Since Rahul and Riya Shah have been dating for seven years, Riya feels pressure from her parents to make a significant commitment. Rahul isn't prepared to settle down just yet. As Rahul meets more individuals and learns more secrets along the way, his writing adventure gets increasingly exciting. But within all of this activity, he was unaware of how his disappearance might affect his personal life. His persistent disregard for Riya's texts and phone calls leads to arguments and, ultimately, a breakup. Rahul's life is completely transformed for the better when he learns about the elderly couple and, after learning about their experience, he does a kind thing for them as well. When he realises how incredibly nostalgic the couple's tale of true love is, he admits his own shortcomings and resolves to put things right with Riya. After running back to Riya, he apologises to her and they reunite in a touching moment.

== Cast ==
- Mohan Agashe as Rama
- Suhas Joshi as Sunanda
- Sahrud Wardekar as Rahul
- Vaishnavi Karmarkar as Riya
- Ninad Sawant as Kunal
- Utpreksha Suryakant
- Prathamesh Deshpande

== Soundtrack ==
Aathvani

Single album by Rohit Shyam Raut
- Released: 2023
- Genre: Feature film soundtrack
- Length: 4:42
- Language: Marathi
- Label: Zee Music Company

The song "Tu Jara Thamb Na" is sung by Rohit Shyam Raut, composer and lyricist is Suhit Abhyankar, starring Sahrud Wardekar and Vaishnavi Karmarkar.

Track listing
No.	Title	Lyrics	Music	Singer (s)	Length
1.	"Tu Jara Thamb Na"	Suhit Abhyankar	Suhit Abhyankar	Rohit Shyam Raut	4:42

== Release ==
=== Theatrical ===
The film was theatrically released on 7 July 2023 all over Maharashtra.

=== Home media ===
The film was released on OTT platform Amazon Prime Video in September 2023 all over India.

== Reception ==
=== Critical reception ===
A reviewer from Flickonclick rated it 3/5 and wrote that "it is a captivating film that explores the power of love, self-discovery, and the magic of words".

A reviewer from Film Information called the film is a dull fare.
