= Astu =

- Astu poster
- Directed by: Sumitra Bhave; Sunil Sukthankar
- Written by: Sumitra Bhave
- Screenplay by: Sumitra Bhave
- Story by: Sumitra Bhave
- Produced by: Sheelaa Rao; Mohan Agashe
- Starring: Mohan Agashe; Iravati Harshe; Amruta Subhash; Milind Soman; Devika Daftardar
- Cinematography: Milind Jog
- Edited by: Mohit Takalkar
- Music by: Saket Kanetkar; Dhananjay Kharwandikar
- Release dates: July 2013 (Indian Film Festival Stuttgart); 15 July 2016
- Running time: 123 minutes
- Country: India
- Language: Marathi

Astu: So Be It (or simply Astu) is a 2015 Indian Marathi-language film directed by the duo Sumitra Bhave and Sunil Suktankar, starring Mohan Agashe, Iravati Harshe, Milind Soman, and Amruta Subhash. The film tells the story of Chakrapani Shastri, a Sanskrit scholar with Alzheimer's disease.

== Plot ==
Dr. Chakrapani Shastri, fondly known as Appa, is a retired Sanskrit professor and a former director of the Oriental Research Institute in Pune. Shastri currently lives with Ram, a young student, as his caretaker, and has been diagnosed with advanced Alzheimer's disease. One day, as Ram has to appear for his exams, Shastri's elder daughter Ira brings Shastri to her house. While driving back home, Ira stops at a shop, requesting Shastri to stay in the car. Shastri sees a passing elephant on the road. He becomes fascinated and with some help, gets himself out of the car and starts following the elephant through the lanes of the city. When Ira comes back and finds her father gone, she and her husband, Madhav, begin searching for him and report him missing.

As Shastri keeps following Laxmi the elephant, her mahout, Anta, tries to get Shastri to go home. However, Shastri does not remember anything and reaches the mahout's house, where he meets the man's wife, Channamma. She takes care of Shastri along with her newborn. Ira informs her sister Devika of their father's disappearance, but the latter blames Ira and suggests an old-age home for their father. The police trace the elephant's whereabouts and find Shastri, but accuse the mahout of kidnapping the old man. Shastri refuses to go back to Ira, wanting to stay with Channamma. Finally, they manage to convince the senior scholar to return home.

== Cast ==
- Mohan Agashe as Dr. Chakrapani Shastri
- Iravati Harshe as Ira, Shastri's older daughter
- Amruta Subhash as Channamma
- Milind Soman as Madhav, Ira's husband
- Devika Daftardar as Rahi, Shastri's younger daughter
- Jyoti Subhash as Malti Kaku
- Nachiket Purnapatre as Anta, mahout

== Production ==
Actor Mohan Agashe was approached with the idea of a short film that deals with Alzheimer's disease. Though he liked the project, he wasn't satisfied with the script and suggested improving it. He invited Sumitra Bhave to meet with the filmmaker, and she ended up turning it into a feature-length production. After shooting was completed, one of the co-producers backed out of post-production. Agashe contributed from his pension to complete the remaining work.

== Release and reception ==
Though the film was completed in 2013, it did not find a distributor and was released through crowdfunding in 2016. It was originally released in Pune in 2014 and later re-released to qualify for the Maharashtra state film subsidy, which requires the film to be released in ten state districts. It was also screened at the New York Film Festival (NYFF) and a special screening was organised at the Harvard University campus to raise awareness of problems suffered by the elderly due to lack of human interaction. A panel discussion was also held, with the participation of Mohan Agashe and professors Arthur Kleinman and Diana L. Eck.

The film was praised for its depiction of Alzheimer's disease and dementia, as well as the performances of the lead actors. Namrata Joshi of The Hindu wrote that, "though the film is about loss of memory, it's structured and built around a series of recollections" and mentioned that the film builds awareness of Alzheimer's disease but "does not slip into sermonizing, it remains sensitive, not sentimental". Mihir Bhanage of The Times of India wrote that the "splendid narration and direction, coupled with excellent performances, are a high point of this film".

== Awards ==
The film won several awards upon release.

Year	Award	Category	Recipient(s) and nominee(s)	Result	Ref(s)
2013	11th Indian Film Festival Stuttgart	Audience Award for Best Film	Astu	Won	
2013	2nd Delhi International Film Festival	Best Regional Film	Astu	Won	
2013	61st National Film Awards	Best Dialogue	Sumitra Bhave	Won	
2013	61st National Film Awards	Best Supporting Actress	Amruta Subhash	Won	
2013	Kolhapur International Film Festival	Audience Award for Best Film	Astu	Won	
2013	Kolhapur International Film Festival	Best Film	Astu	Won	
2013	Kolhapur International Film Festival	Best Direction	Sumitra Bhave and Sunil Sukthankar	Won	
2013	Kolhapur International Film Festival	Best Screenplay	Sumitra Bhave	Won	
2014	Marathi International Cinema and Theatre Awards (MICTA)	Best Film	Astu	Nominated	
2014	Marathi International Cinema and Theatre Awards	Best Direction	Sumitra Bhave and Sunil Sukthankar	Nominated	
2014	Marathi International Cinema and Theatre Awards	Best Actor	Mohan Agashe	Won	
2014	Marathi International Cinema and Theatre Awards	Best Actress	Iravati Harshe	Won	
2014	Marathi International Cinema and Theatre Awards	Actress in Supporting Role	Amruta Subhash	Won	
2014	Marathi International Cinema and Theatre Awards	Best Art Direction	Sumitra Bhave and Santosh Sankhad	Nominated	
2014	Marathi International Cinema and Theatre Awards	Best Dialogues	Sumitra Bhave	Nominated	
2014	Marathi International Cinema and Theatre Awards	Best Screenplay	Sumitra Bhave	Nominated	
2014	Marathi International Cinema and Theatre Awards	Best Story	Sumitra Bhave	Nominated	
2014	Marathi International Cinema and Theatre Awards	Best Sound	Pramod Thomas	Nominated	
2014	14th New York Indian Film Festival	Best Film	Astu	Nominated	
2014	14th New York Indian Film Festival	Best Actor	Mohan Agashe	Nominated	
2014	14th New York Indian Film Festival	Best Actress	Iravati Harshe	Nominated	
2015	1st Filmfare Marathi Awards	Critics' Best Actor in a Leading Role (Male)	Mohan Agashe	Won	
2015	1st Filmfare Marathi Awards	Best Actor in a Leading Role (Male)	Mohan Agashe	Nominated	
2015	1st Filmfare Marathi Awards	Best Actor in a Leading Role (Female)	Iravati Harshe	Nominated	
2015	1st Filmfare Marathi Awards	Best Actor in a Supporting Role (Female)	Amruta Subhash	Won	
2015	1st Filmfare Marathi Awards	Best Background Score	Saket Kanitkar	Nominated	
