= Kaasav =

- Poster
- Directed by: Sumitra Bhave; Sunil Sukthankar
- Written by: Sumitra Bhave
- Screenplay by: Sumitra Bhave
- Story by: Sumitra Bhave
- Produced by: Mohan Agashe; Sumitra Bhave; Sunil Sukthankar
- Starring: Iravati Harshe; Alok Rajwade; Kishor Kadam; Mohan Agashe; Devika Daftardar; Santosh Redkar; Omkar Ghadi
- Cinematography: Dhananjay Kulkarni
- Edited by: Mohit Takalkar
- Music by: Saket Kanetkar
- Distributed by: SonyLIV
- Release date: October 2016
- Running time: 104 minutes
- Country: India
- Language: Marathi

Kaasav (English: Turtle) is a 2016 Indian Marathi-language film released on 6 October 2017. It was directed by filmmaker duo Sumitra Bhave–Sunil Sukthankar and produced by Mohan Agashe in association with Bhave–Sukthankar's production company "Vichitra Nirmiti". The film won the National Film Award for Best Feature Film at the 64th National Film Awards. It became the fifth Marathi film to win in this category.

== Plot ==
Maanav (Alok Rajwade) has been hospitalized for cutting his wrists. He runs away from the hospital. Janaki (Iravati Harshe) finds him collapsed on the side of the road. She asks her driver Yadu (Kishor Kadam) to take him home to Devgad (Konkan) and appoints a private doctor. Janaki is a divorcee who often consults a psychologist for her panic attacks. She also helps Dattabhau (Mohan Agashe), who is working on an olive ridley sea turtles conservation program.

== Cast ==
- Iravati Harshe as Janaki
- Alok Rajwade as Maanav
- Mohan Agashe as Dattabhau
- Kishor Kadam as Yadu

== Production ==
Mohan Agashe had acted and co-produced filmmaker duo Sumitra Bhave–Sunil Sukthankar's earlier film Astu (2016). A New Jersey–based couple, Prakash and Alka Lothe, saw Astu and liked it and gave ₹ 50 lakh to its producer-directors to make another film based on mental disorders.

Bhave–Sukthankar found it difficult to find producers to make Kaasav which is based on depression as its theme. Agashe produced the film with Bhave and Sukthankar.

The film was shot in a single 18-day schedule at Devgad's beaches. As it depicts the issue of depression among youngsters in relation to the life and nesting cycle of olive ridley sea turtles, the team did a lot of research on the endangered species.

Agashe, himself being a psychiatrist, provided clinical material to the filmmakers that also included psychiatrist and researcher Vikram Patel's book, "Where There is No Psychiatrist: A Mental Health Care Manual".

== Reception and awards ==
The film won the Golden Lotus Award (Swarna Kamal) National Film Award for Best Feature Film at the 64th National Film Awards. The citation states that this is "in appreciation of the perfect blending of an environmental behaviour and a personal one in a poignantly beautiful cinematic way." It became the fifth Marathi film to win in this category.

The film also participated in various international film festivals like the Mumbai Film Festival (2016), the Kolkata International Film Festival (2016), the International Film Festival of Kerala (2016), the Bengaluru International Film Festival (2017), and the New York Indian Film Festival (2017).

The protagonist Alok Rajwade also won the Best Actor Award in the BRICS Film Festival-2017 held in China in June 2017. The BRICS Film Festival was held in Chengdu, southwest China's Sichuan Province.

Actress Iravati Harshe won Critics Award Best Actress – Filmfare Awards Marathi 2017 and Maharashtra State Film Award for Best Actress.
