= Vani Tripathi =

Indian politician

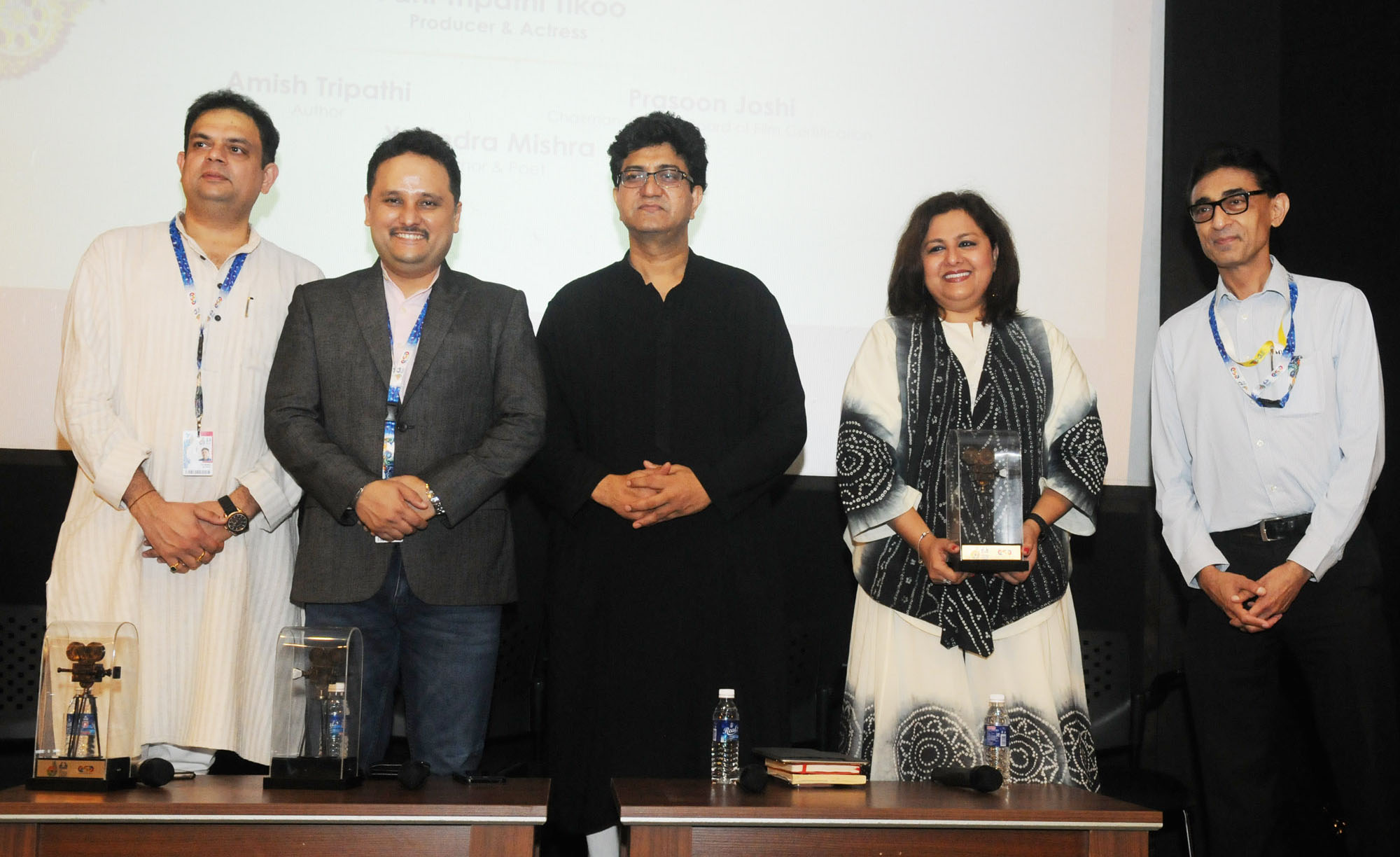
- Tripathi, IFFI (2017)
- Born: 4 July 1979 (age 47); New Delhi, India
- Occupations: Actor, politician
- Political party: Bharatiya Janata Party

Vani Tripathi is an Indian actress and politician. She served as the former national secretary of Bharatiya Janata Party and has acted in films like Chalte Chalte and Dushman.

== Personal life ==
Vani's family hails from Uttarakhand and her father was a professor in Delhi University. She married Gurgaon based Kashmiri Businessman Hemant Tikoo in October 2013.

== Political career ==
Vani Tripathi is the former national secretary of the Bharatiya Janata Party, the ruling party of India, an actor by profession, she has been an activist bringing issues related to youth and women to the notice of various forums and has led several leadership programmes in India and abroad.

Her campaign and outreach programmes focused on encouraging women's participation in politics. As a celebrity campaigner of the BJP, she has also managed campaigns for several candidates, especially women in various parts of India, including cities like Delhi, Mumbai, states of Chhattisgarh, Uttarakhand, Madhya Pradesh and Maharashtra.

== Film career and education ==
Vani has a bachelor's degree in political science from Hindu college, Delhi university. She has worked with theatre stalwarts like Barry John and Maya Rao besides Ebrahim Alkazi. She has also worked with directors including Mahesh Bhatt, Tanuja Chandra and Kundan Shah. Vani has been deeply involved in theatre, films and television and has worked in projects both in India and abroad.

Vani also worked as an actor-teacher at the National School of Drama's theatre in Education Company for few years situated in New Delhi. Vani Tripathi is actively involved with Madhya Pradesh School of Drama (MPSD). She is doing Eehsaas and Agneepath on the national network.

== Filmography ==
Year	Film	Role	Language	Notes
2006	Dil Se Pooch... Kidhar Jaana Hai	Aliya	Hindi	
2004	Inteqam: The Perfect Game	Vani Trapathi	Hindi	
2003	Chalte Chalte		Hindi	Special appearance as a Friend
2000	Phir Bhi Dil Hai Hindustani	Mini	Hindi	
1998	Dushman	Sunanda Tripathi	Hindi	
1997	Nel profondo paese straniero	Prostituta Indiana	Hindi	
