= Venai, Khuzestan =

Venai ونایی
- Village
- Location within Iran
- Coordinates: 32°48′21″N 48°19′30″E
- Country: Iran
- Province: Khuzestan
- County: Andimeshk
- Bakhsh: Alvar-e Garmsiri
- Rural District: Qilab

Population (2006)
  - Total: 142
- Time zone: UTC+3:30 (IRST)
  - Summer (DST): UTC+4:30 (IRDT)

Venai (Persian: ونایی, also Romanized as Venā’ī; also known as Vahā’ī) is a village in Qilab Rural District, Alvar-e Garmsiri District, Andimeshk County, Khuzestan Province, Iran. As of the 2006 census, its population was 142, in 27 families.
