= Ek Cup Chya =

- Directed by: Sumitra Bhave–Sunil Sukthankar
- Written by: Sumitra Bhave
- Produced by: Yeshwant Oak
- Starring: Kishor Kadam; Ashwini Giri
- Cinematography: Milind Jog
- Edited by: Mohit Takalkar
- Music by: Shrirang Umrani
- Distributed by: K.S. Wani Memorial Trust & Schizophrenia Awareness Association
- Release date: 4 December 2009
- Running time: 120 minutes
- Country: India
- Language: Marathi
- Budget: INR 6.3 million

Ek Cup Chya (English: A Cup of Tea) is a Marathi film based on the Right to Information (RTI) Act. The film was the second project of activist producer Yeshwant Oak. Previously he had collaborated with the same directors Sumitra Bhave–Sunil Sukthankar to produce Devrai in 2004 (an equally acclaimed film to create awareness about schizophrenia).

== Synopsis ==
Kashinath Sawant is a bus conductor with the state transport corporation in Maharashtra. He lives in Kankavali in the coastal region (Konkan) of Maharashtra with his mother, his wife Rukmini and their two daughters: Vasanti who is a nurse and Vanadevi, a student. The couple also have two sons, college student Chandan and Abeer, who is in 10th grade preparing to take the state level secondary board exam.

The Sawant family receives a huge electricity of Bill of Rs.73,000, leaving them trapped and humiliated by the system. During Kashinath's visits to the electricity board he learns that he must pay a bribe to fix his problem. The film uses a cup of tea, normally a symbol of hospitality, as a metaphor for a bribe.

He is introduced to Dr. Durga Khanolkar, a social activist who is creating awareness about the RTI Act. With the help of the activist and his friend Sayyed, he files an RTI application. Initially he is ridiculed, but when he files an appeal with the Information Commissioner, things become a little more serious. An engineer from the electricity board asks his higher-ups to stop Kashinath from appearing at a hearing in Mumbai. After overcoming many hurdles, Kashinath is able to reach Mumbai, but is too late.

He loses all hope and returns to work, but to his astonishment electricity is restored to his home and Abheer secures second place in the state level examination, despite his studying by oil lamp.

== Cast ==
- Kishor Kadam
- Ashwini Giri
- Om Bhutkar
- Parna Pethe
- Mrunmayee Deshpande

== Recognition ==
The film started getting recognition after only a few screenings. Even the producer in an interview with Mumbai Mirror conceded that "Our experience of screening the film for the general public at a Pune theatre was quite disappointing.”

The film was screened or is expected to travel at

- Mumbai International Film Festival
- Goa Film Festival
- Copenhagen International Film Festival
- London Film Festival
- Miami International Film Festival
