= Vanai, Dahanu =

Village in Maharashtra

Vanai
- village
- Location in Maharashtra, India Vanai (India)
- Coordinates: 19.8743923°N 72.8013252°E
- Country: India
- State: Maharashtra
- District: Palghar
- Taluka: Dahanu
- Elevation: 25 m (82 ft)

Population (2011)
  - Total: 2,953
- Time zone: UTC+5:30 (IST)
- 2011 census code: 551742

Vanai is a village in the Palghar district of Maharashtra, India. It is located in the Dahanu taluka.

== Demographics ==
According to the 2011 census of India, Vanai has 602 households. The effective literacy rate (i.e. the literacy rate of population excluding children aged 6 and below) is 46.22%.

Demographics (2011 Census)
	Total	Male	Female
Population	2953	1455	1498
Children aged below 6 years	469	244	225
Scheduled caste	0	0	0
Scheduled tribe	2897	1426	1471
Literates	1148	740	408
Workers (all)	1406	796	610
Main workers (total)	706	454	252
Main workers: Cultivators	164	97	67
Main workers: Agricultural labourers	438	271	167
Main workers: Household industry workers	6	5	1
Main workers: Other	98	81	17
Marginal workers (total)	700	342	358
Marginal workers: Cultivators	51	33	18
Marginal workers: Agricultural labourers	523	238	285
Marginal workers: Household industry workers	4	1	3
Marginal workers: Others	122	70	52
Non-workers	1547	659	888
