= Aasakta Kalamanch =

Theatre troupe based in Pune, Maharashtra, India

Aasakta Kalamanch (also known popularly as Aasakta) is a Pune-based theatre troupe founded in the early 200s, known for its work in contemporary Marathi theatre, often blending experimental, socially relevant, and minimalist styles.

== History ==
Aasakta Kalamanch produces plays in Marathi, Hindi, Urdu and English. It began as a non profit organisation in 2003 to produce contemporary theatre productions. In 2008, it was India's entry at Cairo International Festival of Experimental Theatre. It is headed by Mohit Takalkar. Sachin Kundalkar was the first playwright and his play Chhotyasha Suttit was appreciated by the critics. In 2017, they performed their play Gajab Kahani, at Aadyam's third season. The group recently celebrated their fifteenth anniversary by performing plays at Prithvi Theatre, Mumbai. In 2018, the group performed their play Tichi Satra Prakarne at IAPAR International Theatre Festival.

== Selective performances ==
- 2010, NCPA's Centrestage Theatre Festival.
- 2013, Ranga Shankara Festival.
- 2014, National School of Drama's International Drama Festival.
- 2017, Aadyam.
- 2018, IAPAR International Theatre Festival.
- 2019, Sarang Theatre Festival.
- 2019, Bharat Rang Mahostav organised by National School of Drama, at Delhi.

== Plays ==
Year of first show	Name	Translation	Plot Summary	Notes
2004	Chhotyasha Suttit	In a small holiday		It was directed by Mohit Takalkar.
2009	Anandbhog Mall	–	The play explores the subject of casteism in India. The story revolves around a Maratha doctor and his Brahmin wife. Even after five years of marriage they still have caste biases. The play explores their relationship.	
2009	Garbo	–	The story revolves around Garbo, an actress and her three flatmates : Shrimant, Intuc and Pansy.	It was staged in the 70s and was written by Mahesh Elkunchwar.
2009	Matra Ratra	Only night	The story revolves around a married couple Nilu and Anju, in their late 20s.The tale spans and proceeds over 17 nights.	It is an adaptation of Bradley Hayward's play, Legitimate Hooey. The play was initially performed in Marathi, but later presented in English on public demand.
2011	Charshe Koti Visarbhole	Four Million Forgetfuls	It was written in 1986. It is set in 3985 AD and is a political satire. It tells the story of a dystopian world where workers get paid in life span. It goes on to portray the rivalry between the rich and the middle class.	
2012	Shillak	Remaining	The play revolves the agony of current generation, caused by socio-economic changes.	It is written by Sagar Deshmukh.
2015	Mein Huun Yusuf Aur Ye Hai Mera Bhai	I am Yusuf and this is my brother	It is based on the UN resolution on Palestine.	The play has won the Best Production, Best Director and Best Innovative Sound Design awards at Mahindra Excellence in Theatre Awards (META).Its directed by Mohit Takalkar.
2016	Mukaam Dehru, Jila Nagaur	Destination Dehru, District Nagaur	The play is set in the year 1942. The play is set in the village of Dehru, in Rajasthan. The play revolves around the Quit India Movement and the World War 2	
2017	Gajab Kahani	–	It is the story of an elephant named Solomon and its mahout, Subhro's journey from Lisbon.	It is an adaptation of José Saramago's The Elephant’s Journey.
2017	Respect	-	The story revolves around four boys on their way to Cologne. It is based on a true incident involving honor killing.	It is based on German play from 2007.It is written and directed by German actor and playwright Lutz Hübner.
2018	Mathemagician	–	It is a story set in Babylon, Greece, about Nikor, a man who becomes the chief mathematician.Nikor was played by Ipsita Chakraborty Singh, as a eunuch	It is based on a script by Gowri Ramnarayan.
2019	Chaheta	The beloved	The play revolves around Abraham, when he had to nearly sacrifice his son Isaac.It had themes from Christianity, Judaism and Islam.	It is based on a script by the Palestinian writer Amir Nizar Zuabi.
2023	Ghanta Ghanta Ghanta Ghanta Ghanta		It is a Marathi adaptation of UK-based playwright Sam Steiner's ‘Lemons, Lemons, Lemons, Lemons, Lemons’. The story is set in a world where people can only speak 140 words every day — a comment on state control over basic freedoms.	
Unknown	Junglenama	–		
Unknown	Bandish	–		
Unknown	Bed ke Neeche Rehne Wali	The girl who lives under the bed	Ira had an imaginary friend who lived under her bed called Manu. The story progresses as Ira grows up and forgets Manu and how Manu wants to know why.	
Unknown	Tichi Satra Prakarne	Her seventeen affairs	It is an adaptation of Martin Crimp's Attempts on Her Life. It is the story of a woman's multiple affairs.	
Unknown	Tu	You		
Unknown	Uney Purey Shahar Ek	–		

== Recognition ==
- Best Director for Mein Huun Yusuf Aur Ye Mera Bhai at 11th Mahindra Excellence for Theatre Awards (META).

== See also ==
- Natak Company
