= Devrai =

2004 film by Sumitra Bhave–Sunil Sukthankar

- Directed by: Sumitra Bhave; Sunil Sukthankar
- Story by: Sumitra Bhave
- Produced by: Y. N. Oak of Schizophrenia Awareness Association; K. S. Vani Memorial Trust
- Starring: Atul Kulkarni, Sonali Kulkarni, Devika Daftardar, Tushar Dalvi
- Cinematography: Debu Deodhar
- Edited by: Sumitra Bhave, Virendra Valsangkar
- Music by: Shrirang Umarani
- Distributed by: Everest Entertainment Pvt. Ltd.
- Release date: 11 March 2004
- Running time: 108 minutes
- Country: India
- Language: Marathi

Devrai (English: Sacred Grove) is a 2004 Indian Marathi film directed by filmmaker duo Sumitra Bhave–Sunil Sukthankar and produced by the Schizophrenia Awareness Association and K. S. Wani Memorial Trust. The film stars Atul Kulkarni, Sonali Kulkarni, Devika Daftardar, Tushar Dalvi, and Mohan Agashe and was released on 11 March 2004. The film's music is by Shrirang Umarani. It depicts a story of a man who has schizophrenia and is struggling to come to terms with his illness and the frustration of his helpless sister.

The film received critical acclaim for the portrayal of schizophrenia and performances of its leads, and won several awards upon its release including four awards: the Best Film, the Best Director, the Best Actor, and the Best Actress award at the 11th Screen Awards (Marathi), the Technical Excellence Award at the International Film Festival of Kerala and was awarded the Best Film on Environment Conservation / Preservation at the 52nd National Film Awards. Atul Kulkarni was awarded with the Special Jury Award at the Mumbai International Film Festival and Sonali Kulkarni bagged the Best Actress Award at the 42nd Maharashtra State Film Awards.

== Plot ==
As a child, Shesh Desai an intelligent boy (Atul Kulkarni) grew up with his mother, sister Seena (Sonali Kulkarni), and cousin Kalyani (Devika Daftardar). He loves to spend his time outdoors, amongst nature. As the kids grow older Shesh begins to get attracted to Kalyani. On discovering this his horrified mother forces Kalyani to go back to her father's place, away from the village. This upsets Shesh a lot.

Shesh has created an imaginary world centered on his devotion to the Devrai, a sacred grove near his village. He wants to conduct research on the Devrai but his mother refuses to help out with funds as she has limited resources and a daughter to marry off. Shesh doesn't take this well. After failing to graduate from college he is asked to look after the family's mango orchard. The research never progresses.

Shesh gradually becomes a loner and eccentric after his mother's death and sister's marriage. A paranoid concern engulfs him that the villagers intend to destroy the Devrai. He becomes attracted to Parvati (Amruta Subhash), the wife of a family servant Shambhu, and fantasises her as a goddess who is an inhabitant of the grove.

Seena invites Shesh to her house to celebrate her husband, Sudesh's (Tushar Dalvi) promotion. At the celebration, Shesh gets a panic attack while socialising with guests and becomes furious. Seena tries to offer support to Shesh but Sudesh becomes upset and gets him admitted to a psychiatric facility where he receives treatment by a senior psychiatrist (Mohan Agashe). Shesh keeps visualizing and talking about the Devrai, Parvati. Kalyani makes frequent appearances in his ramblings. The doctors however soon succeed in getting his condition under control. The treatment administered by the team suppresses Shesh's erratic behavior but does not eradicate his imaginary world.

Seena's home life and that of her entire family proves to be very stressful after her brother's discharge from the hospital. Shesh initially refuses to take his medications, is mercurial and extremely difficult to deal with. Seena avoids letting Kalyani meet Shesh throughout the ordeal fearful of the consequences of her presence. Soon though help comes in the form of the sessions at a day care center run by a social worker (Jyoti Subhash) for mentally ill patients. There with the help of fellow patients Shesh comes to the realization that he is ill and needs to take responsibility for his own wellbeing. Seena also attends the sessions for caregivers which helps her see the illness in a new light. Shesh slowly starts developing empathy and wishes to engage with his young nephew, who however keeps Shesh at an arms length.

A dip in Shesh's condition soon comes about and one night during a frantic conversation with Seena he divulges the information that their help Shambhu has murdered his wife Parvati. Seena breaks down with all the stress in her life. She then meets Kalyani and insists her to make an inquiring call back home. Kalyani does so and talks to a much alive Parvati. Seena can see she has failed to take care of her older brother with minimal help from her grudging husband who has concerns with his son being exposed to this volatile home environment. She agrees to send Shesh back to the village and entreaties her cousin to help take care of him. Kalyani has been living in the city, the life of single working woman. She never did remarry after being widowed at a tender age. After reminiscing about the happy days of her childhood and youth spent in the quiet and tranquil village she agrees to Seena's proposal.

All three of them travel back to their childhood home. There Kalyani along with Parvati and Shambhu put Seena's mind at ease about the care of her schizophrenic brother whereupon she returns home to her family.

== Cast ==
- Atul Kulkarni as Shesh Desai
- Sonali Kulkarni as Seena Gore
- Jyoti Subhash as Counsellor
- Devika Daftardar as Kalyani
- Tushar Dalvi as Sudesh, Seena's husband
- Mohan Agashe as Psychologist
- Amruta Subhash as Parvati
- Ashwin Chitale as Seena's son

== Production ==
The film is a joint venture of Schizophrenia Awareness Association (SAA) and K. S. Vani Memorial Trust. Director Sukthankar said that they held discussions with psychiatrists and attended SAA's self-help groups to observe the affected patients. The film's shoot was completed in four months and was shot in and around Pune and in the Konkan region. Director-Writer Bhave said that through Devrai, they tried "to dispel the myths and put schizophrenia in a scientific perspective". The film does not use any background music. While shooting, actor Atul Kulkarni wrote a poem. The filmmaker duo was so impressed with it that they included the poem in the film. The film was released on 11 March 2004.

== Reception and awards ==
The film was appreciated for its depiction of schizophrenia and performances of its leads, and won several awards upon its release. Psychiatrists Vinay Kumar of Indian Psychiatry Association said that "[it] is a thought-provoking film on the subject". Critic Bhawana Somaaya mentions in her book "Fragmented Frames: Reflections of a Critic" (2008) that "Devrai is an insightful journey into the broken structure of a once beautiful mind, today inhabited by delusions and sounds that torment him." The film was screened at the 63rd Annual National Conference of the Indian Psychiatric Society. Rediff's review mentions that "it is tough to depict mental problems seriously in films. Most films that deal with the subject tend to watch from a distance. But Devrai takes you inside the mind of sufferer".

The film was awarded the Best Film on Environment Conservation / Preservation at the 52nd National Film Awards. The citation states that "in this chaotic world, when every body talks about the importance of environment, conservation and preservation but no body cares to learn from the wisdom of myth created by our forefathers and create a space for every mind to realise its potential without judging, discriminating or condemning." It also won four awards: the Best Film, the Best Director, the Best Actor, and the Best Actress award at the 11th Screen Awards (Marathi). The film was awarded the Technical Excellence Award at the International Film Festival of Kerala. Atul Kulkarni won the Special Jury Award at the Mumbai International Film Festival for his performance. Sonali Kulkarni bagged the Best Actress Award and the film won the Award for Best Film with Social Message at the 42nd Maharashtra State Film Awards. The film was presented at the India International Disability Film Festival at Anand theatre in Chennai on 7 July 2005 and was appreciated for portraying "the struggle of a person caught between his two worlds" and "the situation of his family too that tries hard to help him", and the filmmaker duo Bhave–Sukthankar were lauded for "presenting the experiences of a schizophrenic as honestly as possible."
