= Mohan Agashe =

Indian psychiatrist and actor (born 1947)

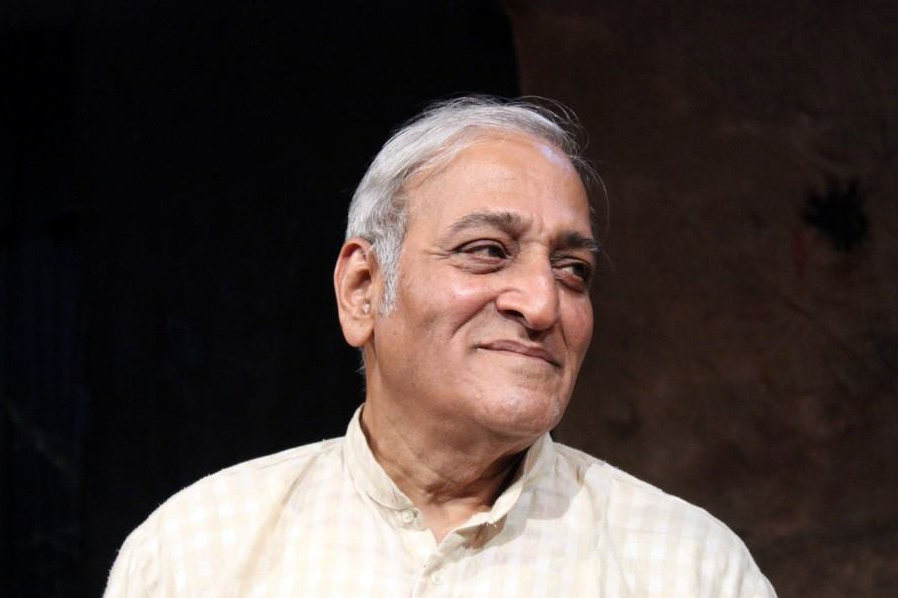
- Agashe in 2013
- Born: Mohan Mahadeo Agashe; 23 July 1947 (age 79); Bhor, Bombay Province, British India
- Occupations: Actor; psychiatrist
- Awards: Padma Shri (1990); Sangeet Natak Akademi Award (1996); Goethe Medal (2004)

Dr. Mohan Agashe (born 23 July 1947) is an Indian psychiatrist and actor. He was awarded the Sangeet Natak Akademi Award in 1996 in theatre.

== Early life ==
Agashe was born in Bhor, Maharashtra. He studied in B. J. Medical College, Pune for his MBBS and MD degree in psychiatry. He later became a professor, before becoming an actor.

== Career ==
=== Medicine ===
Agashe served as a professor of psychiatry at the B. J. Medical College and Sassoon Hospital in Pune. Apart from his medical career, he also worked in the fields of clinical psychology and psychopharmacology. Agashe was also instrumental in establishing the Maharashtra Institute of Mental Health in 1991, a state-level training and research institute in mental health sciences, located in Pune, India. Agashe headed the five-year study on the trauma of the 1993 Latur earthquake, initiated by the Indian Council of Medical Research.

During his early career, Agashe worked in a government hospital at Pune. He also chaired the organising committee meetings for the Annual National Conference of Indian Psychiatric Society held at Armed Forces Medical College, Pune. In 1998, Agashe's project to improve mental health education and service led to the formation of a new policy on mental education by the Government of Maharashtra. He has also served as an Advisor to the Government of Maharashtra on Mental Health Education and Service. Agashe is presently the principal investigator for an Indo–US joint project on Cultural Disorders of Fatigue and Weaknesses.

=== Acting ===
Agashe started out as a theatre artist through Sai Paranjape's children's play. Apart from his career in the medical profession, Mohan Agashe was also quite fond of acting. His love of acting made him take time out of his busy schedule to work in plays. He started his career in acting by working in the theatre. From April 1997 to April 2002, he was the Director General of the Film and Television Institute of India, Pune. He was part of a play called Jara Samjhun Ghya (translation: Try to understand a bit), which he presented for IMA's awareness drive to strength doctor-patient relationship in Pune. In 2018, he was also part of a Harry Potter spoof video by Bharatiya Digital Party, where he portrayed Bumbledore. He was also part of a short film #PuranaPyaar, by Gorilla Shorts.

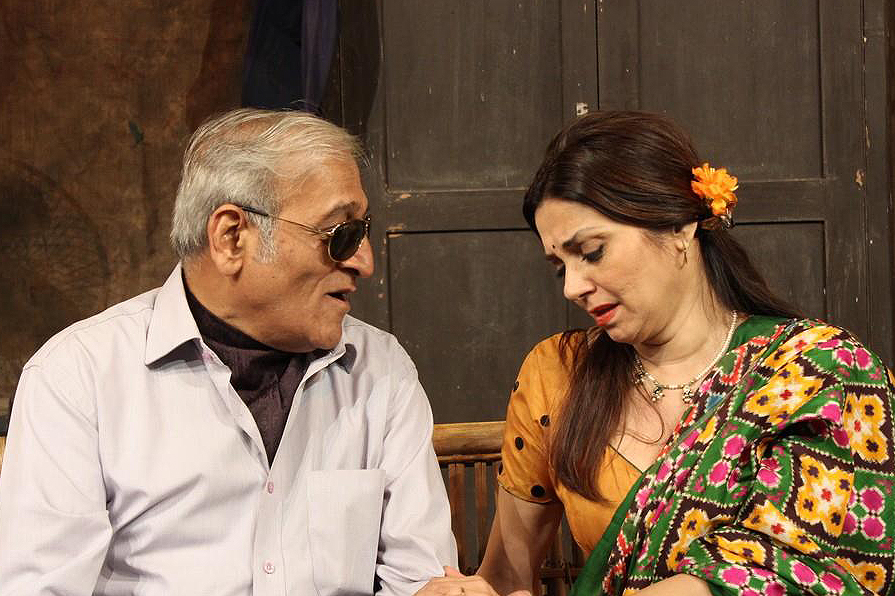
Mohan Agashe and Lillete Dubey performing in the play Aadhe Adhoore, written by Mohan Rakesh

== Filmography ==
=== Films ===
Year	Title	Role	Language
1975	Samna	Maruti Kamble	Marathi
1975	Nishant	Prasad (Zamindar's brother)	Hindi
1976	Manthan	Deshmukh	Hindi
1977	Smothered Voices	Homi	Hindi
1977	Bhumika	Siddharth Sutar	Hindi
1977	Jait Re Jait	Nagya (Bhagat)	Marathi
1978	Hungama Bombay Ishtyle	Jaggu Dada	Hindi
1980	Sinhasan	Budhajirao	Marathi
1980	Aakrosh	Bhonsle, President of the City Council	Hindi
1980	The Sea Wolves	Brothel Keeper	English
1981	Sadgati	The Brahmin	Hindi
1982	Gandhi	Tyeb Mohammed's friend	Hindi
1984	Mashaal	Keshav	Hindi
1984	Paar	Hari Singh	Hindi
1985	Mahananda	Mama	Marathi
1986	Kala Dhanda Goray Log	Custom Office Sudarshan Kumar	Hindi
1986	Musafir	P. A. Pillai	Hindi
1986	Kissa Kathmandu Ka	Lalmohan Ganguly (Jatayu)	Hindi
1987	Uprant	Mohan	Hindi
1987	Susman	President of Handloom Cooperative Society	Hindi
1987	Maha Yatra	Ved Maharaj	Hindi
1988	The Perfect Murder	A.C.P. Samant	Hindi
1988	Rihaee	Roopji	Hindi
1989	Bye Bye Blues	Rug Merchant	Hindi
1991	Suryodaya	Raosaheb Patil	Marathi
1991	Mississippi Masala	Kanti Napkin	English
1992	Dil Aashna Hai	Prem (pimp)	Hindi/Urdu
1992	Ek Hota Vidushak	Himmatrao Inamdar	Marathi
1994	Patang	Criminal	Hindi
1995	Mohini	Dr. Mohan Agashe / Anand	Hindi
1995	Target	Vindhyachal Singh	Hindi
1995	Angrakshak	Khare	Hindi
1995	Trimurti	Kooka Singh	Hindi
1996	Vrindavan Film Studios	Hiralal	Hindi
1996	Katha Don Ganpatraonchi	Ganpatrao Moray-Patil	Marathi
1996	Feluda 30	Maganlal Meghraj	Bengali
1997	Gudia	Braganza	Hindi
1997	Mrityudand	Abhay Singh	Hindi
1998	Zor	Swami Satyavadhi	Hindi
1998	Train to Pakistan	British Official	Hindi
1998	Bombay Blue	Commissioner Singh	English
1999	Hu Tu Tu	Sawantrao Gadre	Hindi
1999	Golapi Mukto Rahasya	Maganlal Meghraj	Bengali
1999	Jato Kando Kathmandu Te	Maganlal Meghraj	Bengali
1999	Katt Katt Kad Kaddu	Hemant's Friend	Hindi
2000	Raju	Guruji	Marathi
2000	Seducing Maarya	Vijay Chatterjee	Hindi
2000	Gaja Gamini	Kalidasa	Hindi
2001	Meri Ishq Ki Kahani	Baji	Hindi
2001	Aks	Prime Minister	Hindi
2001	A Pocket Full of Dreams	Om	
2002	Agni Varsha	Raibhya	Hindi
2003	Gangaajal	DIG Verma	Hindi
2003	Paap	Kaya's Father	Hindi
2004	Devrai	Psychologist	Marathi
2004	Ab Tak Chappan	Ex-Commissioner Pradhan	Hindi
2004	Dance Like a Man	Amritlal Parekh	English
2004	Asambhav	President Veer Pratap Singh	Hindi
2005	James	DCP Vijay Singh Rawat	Hindi
2005	Kay Dyache Bola	Judge Justice Prabhune	Marathi
2005	Apaharan	Prof. Raghuvansh Shastri	Hindi
2006	1st Bite	Guru	English
2006	Rang De Basanti	Indian Defence Minister Shastri	Hindi
2006	Shevri	Vidya's Boss	Marathi
2008	Valu	Sarpanch	Marathi
2009	Gulmohar	Vidya's Father	Marathi
2009	Agnidivya	Dadu Bhat	Marathi
2009	Rita	Shanks	Marathi
2009	Vihir	Ajoba	Marathi
2009	Nishani Dava Anghatha	Unnamed	Marathi
2010	Samudra	Vishnu Khot	Marathi
2010	Kon Aahe Re Tikde?	Zunjarrao Shirke	Marathi
2011	Phhir	Swamiji	Hindi
2011	Deool	Aamdar Saheb	Marathi
2012	Gola Berij	Chitale Master	Marathi
2012	Masala	Sethji	Marathi
2012	Maximum	Mr. Sathe	Marathi
2012	Bharatiya	Sirpanch Sirdeshmukh	Marathi
2012	Jism 2	Unnamed	Hindi
2012	The King & the Commissioner	Indian Prime Minister	Malayalam
2013	Janmantar	Unnamed	Marathi
2013	Gadya Aapla Gaon Bara	Nana	Marathi
2013	Jolly LLB	Senior Dewan	Hindi
2013	Prem Mhanje Prem Mhanje Prem Asta	Mrunal's Father	Marathi
2014	Akalpith	Justice Gore	Marathi
2014	Mohan Rakesh's Adhe Adhure	Singhania / Juneja / Mahendranath	
2014	Dr. Prakash Baba Amte – The Real Hero	Baba Amte	
2015	Astu – So Be It	Appa – Dr.Chakrapani Shastri	
2015	Ab Tak Chhappan 2	Ex Commissioner Pradhan	Hindi
2015	Mahesh Dattani's Hasmukh Saab ki Wasihat	Hasmukh Mehta	Hindi
2015	Dhurandhar Bhatawdekar	Appa Bhatawdekar	Marathi
2015	Welcome Zindagi	Colonel Vagaskar	Marathi
2015	Deool Band	Dr. Vyas	Marathi
2015	The Bright Day	Old Man	Marathi
2015	Monel Maya	Bramhanikar Gaonkar	Marathi
2016	Manithan	Ram Dewan	Tamil
2016	Lost and Found	Shrirang Uncle	Marathi
2016	Phuntroo	Prof. Shankar Rao	Marathi
2017	Yeh Hai India	Prime Minister	Hindi
2017	Kaasav	Dattabhau	Marathi
2017	Deva	Krishnakant	Marathi
2020	Welcome Home	Apparao Joshi	Hindi
2020	Bonus	Aajoba	Marathi
2021	Karkhanisanchi Waari	Satish Karkhanis	Marathi
2021	Toofaan	Bala Kaka	Hindi
2021	Walk Alone	Nana	Hindi
2022	Bachchhan Paandey	Minister Laalji Bhagat	Hindi
2022	Chandramukhi	Dadasaheb Saswadkar	Marathi
2022	Vezham	Leena's grandfather	Tamil
2022	Ekda Kaay Zala	Kiran's Father	Marathi
2023	Pachuvum Athbutha Vilakkum	Nana	Malayalam
2023	Pillu Bachelor	Pillu's Grandfather	Marathi
2023	Aathvani	Rama	Marathi
2024	Lokshahi	Gajanan Chitre	Marathi
2024	Nayan Rahasya	Mahesh Hingorani	Bengali
2024	Article 370	Jagmohan Patil	Hindi
2025	Devmanus	Varkari	Marathi
2025	Aatli Baatmi Futli	Bhaskar Wankhede	Marathi

=== Television ===
Year	Show	Role	Channel	Notes
1986–1987	Kissa Kathmandu Ka	Lalmohan Ganguly (Jatayu)	DD Bangla	Originally on DD National
2008–2010	Agnihotra	Vinayak (Appa) Ganesh Agnihotri	Star Pravah	
2011	Guntata Hriday He	Ananya's Father-in-law	Zee Marathi	
2012	Eka Lagnachi Tisri Goshta	Advocate Deshmukh	Zee Marathi	
2017	Rudram	Ragini's Father	Zee Yuva	
2019	Ti Phulrani	Jagadish Mahapatre	Sony Marathi	
2019	Hutatma	Special appearance	ZEE5	Web Series
2021	Akkad Bakkad Rafu Chakkar	Babaji	Amazon Prime Video	
2022	Human	Mohan Vaidya	Disney+ Hotstar	
2022	RaanBaazaar	Satish Naik	Planet Marathi OTT	
2022	Avrodh: The Siege Within 2	Prime Minister	SonyLIV	
2022	B. E. Rojgaar	Shantanu	Bharatiya Digital Party	
2023	Do Gubbare	Aajoba	Disney+ Hotstar	

=== Plays ===
- Daakghar
- Dhanya MI Kritarth
- Ashi Pakhare Yeti
- Ghashiram Kotval
- Katkon Trikon

=== Short films ===
Year	Title	Role	Language	Notes
2018	Purana Pyaar	Dev Pratap Singh	Hindi	Finalist for Filmfare Short Film Awards

=== Web series ===
Year	Serial	Role	Notes
2022	RaanBaazaar	Satish Naik	
2023	Do Gubbare	Aajoba	

== Awards and nominations ==
Year	Award	Result	Notes
1990	Padma Shri	Won	
1996	Filmfare Best Villain Award	Nominated	For Trimurti
1996	Sangeet Natak Akademi Award	Won	for theatre (Acting: Marathi)
2004	Goethe Medal	Won	
2014	Filmfare Critics Award for Best Actor – Marathi	Won	Astu
2017	Thespo Lifetime Achievement Award	Won	
2018	Vishnudas Bhave Puraskar	Won	
2018	Pride of Planet Award	Won	
2019	Lotu Patil Theatre Award	Won	
