= 43rd National Film Awards =

- Awarded for: Best of Indian cinema in 1995
- Awarded by: Directorate of Film Festivals
- Presented by: Shankar Dayal Sharma (President of India)
- Announced on: 25 May 1996
- Presented on: 6 August 1996
- Site: Vigyan Bhavan, New Delhi
- Official website: dff.nic.in

Highlights
- Best Feature Film: Kathapurushan
- Best Non-Feature Film: Tarana
- Best Book: Marathi Cinema: In Retrospect
- Best Film Critic: M. C. Raja Narayanan
- Dadasaheb Phalke Award: Rajkumar
- Most awards: Kaalapani (4)

The 43rd National Film Awards, presented by Directorate of Film Festivals, the organisation set up by Ministry of Information and Broadcasting, India to felicitate the best of Indian Cinema released in the year 1995. Ceremony took place on 6 August 1996 and awards were given by then President of India, Shankar Dayal Sharma.

== Awards ==
Awards were divided into feature films, non-feature films and books written on Indian cinema.

=== Lifetime Achievement Award ===
Name of Award	Image	Awardee(s)	Awarded As	Awards
Dadasaheb Phalke Award		Rajkumar	Actor, Playback singer	Swarna Kamal, ₹100,000 and a Shawl

=== Feature films ===
Feature films were awarded at All India as well as regional level. For 43rd National Film Awards, a Malayalam film, Kathapurushan won the National Film Award for Best Feature Film whereas a Malayalam film, Kaalapani won the maximum number of awards (4). Following were the awards given in each category:

==== Juries ====
A committee headed by Hrishikesh Mukherjee was appointed to evaluate the feature films awards. Following were the jury members:

- Jury Members
  - Hrishikesh Mukherjee (Chairperson) • Kiran Shantaram • K. G. George • Gautam Bora • M. Prabhakar Reddy • R. Lakshman • Mahendran • Deepti Naval • Narayan Chakraborty • P. A. Saleem • Hari Kumar • Sarat Pujari • Ashok Kumar • Sanjay Chatterjee • K. Ibohal Sharma • P. B. Sreenivas

==== All India Award ====
Following were the awards given:

===== Golden Lotus Award =====
Official Name: Swarna Kamal

All the awardees are awarded with 'Golden Lotus Award (Swarna Kamal)', a certificate and cash prize.

Name of Award	Name of Film	Language	Awardee(s)	Cash prize
Best Feature Film	Kathapurushan	Malayalam	Producer: Adoor Gopalakrishnan director: Adoor Gopalakrishnan	₹50,000/- Each
Best Feature Film	Citation: For the remarkable portrayal of the individual born on the eve of Independence. The film gives an insight into the socio-political evolution of the post-independent India through the individual with outstanding cinematic qualities and universal appeal.			
Best Debut Film of a Director	Kahini	Bengali	Producer: Chandramala Bhattacharya and Malaya Bhattacharya; Director: Malaya Bhattacharya	₹25,000/- Each
Best Debut Film of a Director	Citation: For its bold and innovative style and choice of a subject in which the form and content merges into one.			
Best Popular Film Providing Wholesome Entertainment	Dilwale Dulhania Le Jayenge	Hindi	Producer: Yash Chopra	₹40,000/-
Best Popular Film Providing Wholesome Entertainment	Dilwale Dulhania Le Jayenge	Hindi	Director: Aditya Chopra	₹25,000/-
Best Popular Film Providing Wholesome Entertainment	Citation: For providing meaningful family entertainment through a simple love story with kindness and sensitivity.			
Best Children's Film	Halo	Hindi	Producer: National Center of Films for Children and Young People; Director: Santosh Sivan	₹30,000/- Each
Best Children's Film	Citation: For its refreshing approach to the subject and in bringing out the impact of urban insensitivity from a child's point of view leading to a memorable finale.			
Best Direction	Naseem	Hindi	Saeed Akhtar Mirza	₹50,000/-
Best Direction	Citation: For the deeply moving portrayal of a family in turmoil in the midst of communal disharmony with lyrical quality and brilliant cinematic touches.			

===== Silver Lotus Award =====
Official Name: Rajat Kamal

All the awardees are awarded with 'Silver Lotus Award (Rajat Kamal)', a certificate and cash prize.

Name of Award	Name of Film	Language	Awardee(s)	Cash prize
Best Feature Film on National Integration	Bombay	Tamil	Producer: Mani Ratnam and S. Sriram; Director: Mani Ratnam	₹30,000/- Each
Best Feature Film on National Integration	Citation: For its bold and sensitive approach to the problem of communal divide and for bringing out the futility of the carnage in the name of religion.			
Best Film on Family Welfare	Mini	Malayalam	Producer: Madhu; Director: P. Chandrakumar	₹30,000/- Each
Best Film on Family Welfare	Citation: For the effective handling of the problem of alcoholism through the determined efforts of a young girl to save her father from self destruction.			
Best Film on Other Social Issues	Doghi	Marathi	Producer: NFDC and Doordarshan; Director: Sumitra Bhave and Sunil Sukathnkar	₹30,000/- Each
Best Film on Other Social Issues	Citation: For its depiction of poverty-stricken rural family consisting of two young sisters. The agony of survival in a tradition bound hostile society and their subsequent liberation is beautifully depicted in the film.			
Best Film on Environment / Conservation / Preservation	Rape in the Virgin Forest	Bodo	Producer: Jwngdao Bodosa; Director: Jwngdao Bodosa	₹30,000/- Each
Best Film on Environment / Conservation / Preservation	Citation: For effectively handling the problem of deforestation, through the life and struggle of a tribal community and exposing the real culprits behind this crime.			
Best Actor	The Making of the Mahatma	English	Rajit Kapur	₹10,000/-
Best Actor	Citation: For his extremely sensitive portrayal of Gandhi during his early years in south Africa with great restraint and control. The step by step transformation of a normal man to that of Mahatma is convincingly depicted.			
Best Actress	Bandit Queen	Hindi	Seema Biswas	₹10,000/-
Best Actress	Citation: For her stunning and courageous portrayal of the controversial role of a bandit with grace and conviction.			
Best Supporting Actor	Swami Vivekananda (Part I)	Hindi	Mithun Chakraborty	₹10,000/-
Best Supporting Actor	Citation: For his brilliant and soul searching portrayal of Shree Ramakrishna Paramahamsa and succeeds in elevating the character to a spiritual level.			
Best Supporting Actress	Kathapurushan	Malayalam	Aranmula Ponnamma	₹10,000/-
Best Supporting Actress	Citation: For her work in the film in which she plays the role of a grand mother with tremendous sensitivity which makes her presence in the film memorable.			
Best Child Artist	Kraurya	Kannada	Master Vishwas	₹10,000/-
Best Child Artist	Citation: For his sensitive portrayal of a child, traumatised in an adult world devoid of love and understanding.			
Best Male Playback Singer	Sangeetha Sagara Ganayogi Panchakshara Gavai ("Umandu Ghumandu Ghana Garaje Badara")	Kannada	S. P. Balasubrahmanyam	₹10,000/-
Best Male Playback Singer	Citation: For his soulful rendering of the classical song.			
Best Female Playback Singer	Doghi ("Bhui Bhegalali Khol")	Marathi	Anjali Marathe	₹10,000/-
Best Female Playback Singer	Citation: For her melodious and heart rendering song expressing the aridness of life.			
Best Cinematography	Kaalapani	Malayalam	Cameraman: Santosh Sivan; Laboratory Processing: Gemini Color Lab, Madras	₹10,000/- Each
Best Cinematography	Citation: For bringing out the flavor and authenticity of a period with a remarkable use of lights, shades and colours.			
Best Screenplay	Naseem	Hindi	• Ashok Mishra • Saeed Akhtar Mirza	₹10,000/-
Best Screenplay	Citation: For their masterly and sensitive visual narration of a volatile and confused situation of the year 1992 in India with great depth and simplicity of words.			
Best Audiography	Kaalapani	Malayalam	Deepan Chatterji	₹10,000/-
Best Audiography	Citation: For the meticulous use of sound, creating the unusual aura of Cellular Jail of Andaman.			₹10,000/-
Best Audiography	Halo	Hindi	Deepan Chatterji	₹10,000/-
Best Audiography	Citation: For the unique mixing of incidental and effect sound.			₹10,000/-
Best Editing	Bombay	Tamil	Suresh Urs	₹10,000/-
Best Editing	Citation: For its impeccable craftsmanship in bringing about the pace, rhythm and flow in narrating the story.			
Best Art Direction	Kaalapani	Malayalam	Sabu Cyril	₹10,000/-
Best Art Direction	Citation: For his apt and outstanding recreation of the early decades of this century, with a remarkably detailed work of mis-en-scene.			
Best Costume Design	Bandit Queen	Hindi	Dolly Ahluwalia	₹10,000/-
Best Costume Design	Citation: For her authentic creation of costumes in terms of the tone and texture of the rugged and harsh realities of ravines of Chambal and its people.			
Best Music Direction	Sangeetha Sagara Ganayogi Panchakshara Gavai	Kannada	Hamsalekha	₹10,000/-
Best Music Direction	Citation: For his authentic utilisation of classical Indian music in both the Hindustani and Karnatic style and presenting a wholesome musical structure to the film.			
Best Lyrics	Bhairavi ("Kuch Is Tarah")	Hindi	Amit Khanna	₹10,000/-
Best Lyrics	Citation: The lyrics are meaningful, poetic and sensitively enhance the overall mood of the song sequence, thereby elevating the film.			
Best Special Effects	Kaalapani	Malayalam	S. T. Venki	₹10,000/-
Best Special Effects	Citation: For creating innovative and spectacular visual effects.			
Best Choreography	Yugant	Bengali	Ileana Citaristi	₹10,000/-
Best Choreography	Citation: For her simply graceful and imaginative compositions of the dance sequence.			
Special Jury Award	The Making of the Mahatma	English	Shyam Benegal (Director)	₹25,000/-
Special Jury Award	Citation: For effectively recreating the formative years of Gandhi during his early years in South Africa thereby giving insight into the future "Mahatma".			
Special Mention	Doghi	Marathi	Uttara Baokar (Actor)	Certificate Only
Special Mention	Citation: For her sensitive portrayal of the agony of a mother in the midst of poverty and honour.			Certificate Only
Special Mention	Stri	Telugu	Rohini (Actress)	Certificate Only
Special Mention	Citation: For her lively and poignant performance in the role of a village woman longing for love from her unpredictable paramour.			Certificate Only
Special Mention	Halo	Hindi	Benaf Dadachandji (Child actor)	Certificate Only
Special Mention	Citation: For her charming and natural performance.			Certificate Only

==== Regional Awards ====
The award is given to best film in the regional languages in India.

Name of Award	Name of Film	Awardee(s)	Cash prize
Best Feature Film in Assamese	Itihas	Producer: Leena Bora; Director: Bhabendra Nath Saikia	₹20,000/- Each
Best Feature Film in Assamese	Citation: For its able depiction of complexity of life brought about by urbanisation.		
Best Feature Film in Bengali	Yugant	Producer: NFDC; Director: Aparna Sen	₹20,000/- Each
Best Feature Film in Bengali	Citation: For its contemporary form and thematic content, and subtle handling of the complex subject of a broken marriage. The film has universal appeal which has great relevance in today's society		
Best Feature Film in Hindi	Bandit Queen	Producer: Sundeep Singh Bedi; Director: Shekhar Kapur	₹20,000/- Each
Best Feature Film in Hindi	Citation: For its stark and frank portrayal of an Indian woman in a caste ridden society.		
Best Feature Film in Kannada	Kraurya	Producer: Nirmala Chitgopi; Director: Girish Kasaravalli	₹20,000/- Each
Best Feature Film in Kannada	Citation: For its poignant travail of and old woman'a agony in a middle class family and her complex relationship with the individuals of three generation.		
Best Feature Film in Malayalam	Ormakalundayirikkanam	Producer: Salam Karassery; Director: T. V. Chandran	₹20,000/- Each
Best Feature Film in Malayalam	Citation: For the film, which through the eyes of a young boy traces the graph of a political transformation in Kerala.		
Best Feature Film in Manipuri	Sanabi	Producer: NFDC; Director: Aribam Syam Sharma	₹20,000/- Each
Best Feature Film in Manipuri	Citation: For its apt and poetic handling of the conflict between the traditional and modern values, knitted around a pony symbolically.		
Best Feature Film in Marathi	Bangarwadi	Producer: NFDC and Doordarshan; Director: Amol Palekar	₹20,000/- Each
Best Feature Film in Marathi	Citation: For its realistic portrayal of a Maharashtrian village in the thirties through the experience of a young school teacher who tries to fight against all odds and superstition.		
Best Feature Film in Oriya	Moksha	Producer: Jayadev Mallick and Pramoda Kumar Nayak; Director: Gouri Shankar Das and Malaya Kumar Roy	₹20,000/- Each
Best Feature Film in Oriya	Citation: For depicting the life of two people in a rural set up who suffer an entire life of loneliness and unfulfilment, because of the rigid traditional values of society.		
Best Feature Film in Tamil	Anthimanthaarai	Producer: Megaa Movies; Director: Bharathiraja	₹20,000/- Each
Best Feature Film in Tamil	Citation: For a most heart breaking portrayal of the unrecognised and lonely life of people who fought for the freedom of this country.		
Best Feature Film in Telugu	Stri	Producer: NFDC and Doordarshan; Director: K. S. Sethumadhavan	₹20,000/- Each
Best Feature Film in Telugu	Citation: The film is a startling revelation of the mind of a simple village woman, who asserts her right over her man and stands by him under all circumstances.		

Best Feature Film in Each of the Language Other Than Those Specified in the Schedule VIII of the Constitution

Name of Award	Name of Film	Awardee(s)	Cash prize
Best Feature Film in English	The Making of the Mahatma	Producer: NFDC; Director: Shyam Benegal	₹20,000/- Each
Best Feature Film in English	Citation: For tracing the significant early years of strife and struggle of Gandhi in South Africa in a realistic and lyrical form.		

=== Non-Feature Films ===
Short Films made in any Indian language and certified by the Central Board of Film Certification as a documentary/newsreel/fiction are eligible for non-feature film section.

==== Juries ====
A committee headed by Vijaya Mulay was appointed to evaluate the non-feature films awards. Following were the jury members:

- Jury Members
  - Vijaya Mulay (Chairperson) • Kulanda Kumar Bhattacharya • Naresh Bedi • Pradeep Biswas • M. V. Krishnaswamy

==== Golden Lotus Award ====
Official Name: Swarna Kamal

All the awardees are awarded with 'Golden Lotus Award (Swarna Kamal)', a certificate and cash prize.

Name of Award	Name of Film	Language	Awardee(s)	Cash prize
Best Non-Feature Film	Tarana	English	Producer: Y. N. Engineer for Films Division; Director: Rajat Kapoor	₹20,000/- Each
Best Non-Feature Film	Citation: For its excellent cinematic interpretation of a traditional, mystic music form.			

==== Silver Lotus Award ====
Official Name: Rajat Kamal

All the awardees are awarded with 'Silver Lotus Award (Rajat Kamal)' and cash prize.

Name of Award	Name of Film	Language	Awardee(s)	Cash prize
Best First Non-Feature Film	All Alone If Need Be	English	Producer: Amulya Kakati; Director: Ranjit Das	₹10,000/- Each
Best First Non-Feature Film	Citation: For a sensitive portrayal of Shri Sarat Chandra Sinha, simple upright man of principles with uncompromising integrity and human qualities both in his personal and public life.			
Best Anthropological / Ethnographic Film	Yelhou Jagoi	Meitei	Producer: Indira Gandhi National Centre for the Arts; Director: Aribam Syam Sharma	₹10,000/- Each
Best Anthropological / Ethnographic Film	Citation: For documenting authentically and artistically a traditional dance form of Manipur.			
Best Biographical Film	A Living Legend	English	Producer: Aurora Film Corporation Pvt. Ltd. Director: Satadru Chaki	₹10,000/- Each
Best Biographical Film	Citation: For portraying with sincerity the life of an educationist and parliamentarian Prof. Hiren Mukherjee.			
Best Arts / Cultural Film	Pakarnnattam Ammannur The Actor	Malayalam	Producer: P. G. Mohan; Director: M. R. Rajan and C. S. Venkiteswaran	₹10,000/- Each
Best Arts / Cultural Film	Citation: For recording sensitively the ancient theatre form of Koodiyattam as interpreted by the legendary Koodiyattam actor Ammannur Madhava Chakyar.			
Best Scientific Film	A Celestial Tryst (N. M. No. 291)	English	Producer: Y. N. Engineer for Films Division; Director: Y. N. Engineer for Films Division	₹10,000/- Each
Best Scientific Film	Citation: For presenting the total solar eclipse in all its captivating beauty, while providing relevant scientific information.			
Best Environment / Conservation / Preservation Film	Amrit Beeja	English and Kannada	Producer: Meera Dewan; Director: Meera Dewan	₹10,000/- Each
Best Environment / Conservation / Preservation Film	Citation: For successfully recording our traditions in the field of preservation of environment by women.			
Best Agricultural Film	Drip and Sprinkler Irrigation	Hindi	Producer: L. K. Upadhyaya for Films Division; Director: A. K. Goorha for Films Division	₹10,000/- Each
Best Agricultural Film	Citation: For the simple, direct and clear demonstration of new irrigation systems.			
Best Historical Reconstruction / Compilation Film	Bhalji Pendharkar	English	Producer: C. S. Nair and B. R. Shendge for Films Division; Director: P. B. Pendharkar for Films Division	₹10,000/- Each
Best Historical Reconstruction / Compilation Film	Citation: For its careful reconstruction of the life of a pioneering film maker, vis-a-vis the national movement and post independence scenario.			
Best Film on Social Issues	Memories of Fear	Hindi and English	Producer: Flavia Agnes, Majlis Production; Director: Madhushree Dutta	₹10,000/- Each
Best Film on Social Issues	Citation: For exposing with insight the fear psychosis and humiliation of women in the patriarchal Indian society.			
Best Educational / Motivational / Instructional Film	Home Away From Home	English	Producer: V. B. Joshi; Director: Late Vishram Revankar	₹10,000/- Each
Best Educational / Motivational / Instructional Film	Citation: For presenting ably how the vision of Dr. Karve has been turned into a reality for education and development of women.			
Best Investigative Film	Limit to Freedom	English	Producer: Deepak Roy; Director: Deepak Roy	₹10,000/- Each
Best Investigative Film	Citation: For depicting the miserable plight of women prisoners and their bleak protests for any future.			
Best Animation Film	O	English	Producer: Bhimsain; Director: Kireet Khurana; Animator: Kireet Khurana	₹10,000/- Each
Best Animation Film	Citation: For succinctly and with humor showing that acquisitions can become a burden and only after this load is cast off that human beings become happy like children.			
Best Short Fiction Film	The Rebel	Hindi	Producer: John Sankaramangalam; Director: Rajashree	₹10,000/- Each
Best Short Fiction Film	Citation: For showing an adolescent's journey to maturity and his coming to terms with his mother.			
Best Film on Family Welfare	Soch Samajh Ke	Hindi	Producer: Shanta Gokhle and Arun Khopkar; Director: Arun Khopkar	₹10,000/- Each
Best Film on Family Welfare	Citation: For presenting aesthetically how family welfare could be achieved despite complex family relationships.			
Best Cinematography	Tarana	Hindi	Cameraman: Rafey Mehmood; Laboratory Processing: Adlabs	₹10,000/- Each
Best Cinematography	Citation: For the beautiful images achieved through fascinating camera movements, excellent lighting, composition in tandem with music.			
Best Audiography	Tatva	Hindi	Shyam Sunder	₹10,000/-
Best Audiography	Citation: For the creative use of sound to interpret the theme of the film.			
Best Editing	Kutravali and Oodaha	Tamil	B. Lenin and V. T. Vijayan	₹10,000/-
Best Editing	Citation: For rhythmic pace in relation to the appropriate mood of both the films.			
Best Music Direction	Amrit Beeja	English and Kannada	Shubha Mudgal	₹10,000/-
Best Music Direction	Citation: For providing suitable support with a mix of classical and folk music.			
Special Jury Award	Sona Maati	Marwari	Sehjo Singh (Producer)	₹10,000/-
Special Jury Award	Citation: For presenting an excellent, inspiring portrait of a woman peasant who is leading the struggle of women against land grabbing.			
Special Mention	Ajit	Hindi	Arvind Singh (Director)	Certificate Only
Special Mention	Citation: For his sensitive portrayal of migrant child labour.			Certificate Only
Special Mention	Ithihasathile Khasak	English and Malayalam	Rashmi Film Society (Producer)	Certificate Only
Special Mention	Citation: For its brave attempt to interpret a literary work, cinematically.			Certificate Only
Special Mention	Majhi	Bengali	Biswadeb Dasgupta (Producer and Director)	Certificate Only
Special Mention	Citation: For presenting with sincerity that human values ultimately triumph.			Certificate Only

=== Best Writing on Cinema ===
The awards aim at encouraging study and appreciation of cinema as an art form and dissemination of information and critical appreciation of this art-form through publication of books, articles, reviews etc.

==== Juries ====
A committee headed by Aruna Vasudev was appointed to evaluate the writing on Indian cinema. Following were the jury members:

- Jury Members
  - Aruna Vasudev (Chairperson) • Vinod Tiwari • Rangarajan (Sujata)

==== Golden Lotus Award ====
Official Name: Swarna Kamal

All the awardees are awarded with 'Golden Lotus Award (Swarna Kamal)' and cash prize.

Name of Award	Name of Book	Language	Awardee(s)	Cash prize
Best Book on Cinema	Marathi Cinema: In Retrospect	English	Author: Sanjit Narwekar; Publisher: Govind Swarup	₹15,000/- Each
Best Book on Cinema	Citation: For thoroughly researched and well written history of Marathi cinema from the silent era to the present. The text is combined with photographs in such a way as to make the book as visually pleasing as it is valuable as a reference book.			
Best Film Critic		English and Malayalam	M. C. Raja Narayanan	₹15,000/-
Best Film Critic	Citation: For his well written and analytical articles on both World cinema and the works of Indian directors. He writes with rare fluency in Malayalam and in English offering perceptive insights in a direct and readable style.			

==== Special Mention ====
All the award winners are awarded with Certificate of Merit.

Name of Award	Name of Book	Language	Awardee(s)	Cash prize
Special Mention (Book on Cinema)	Alanti Chalanchitram	Telugu	K. N. T. Sastry	Certificate Only
Special Mention (Book on Cinema)	Citation: For his chronological and valuable accounts of the significant films produced in the first 25 years of Telugu cinema.			Certificate Only
Special Mention (Book on Cinema)	Cinemachi Chittarkatha	Marathi	Ashok Rane	Certificate Only
Special Mention (Book on Cinema)	Citation: For his comprehensive introduction to World cinema for Marathi readers.			Certificate Only

=== Awards not given ===
Following were the awards not given as no film was found to be suitable for the award:

- Best Feature Film in Punjabi
- Best Non-Feature Film Direction
- Best Promotional Film
- Best Exploration / Adventure Film
