= Still Life with Husband =

2007 novel by Lauren Fox

Still Life with Husband is a novel by Lauren Fox. It was published by Knopf Publishers on February 7, 2007. It is the author's first novel. Publishers Weekly described the book as "chick lit for early marrieds".

Claudia Deane of The Washington Post describes the story arc as the main character entering a "slippery slope". The main character, Emily Ross, living in Milwaukee, Wisconsin, is not sure whether she wants to stay married to her husband, who wants to move to a suburban area and start a family, or whether to pursue a relationship with another man, David Keller.

Kirkus Reviews describes Emily as "a banally self-centered character." Publishers Weekly stated that the main character has "a decidedly entitled, gee-whiz quality" which a person who has prior experience with romantic relations may find difficult to tolerate. Writer Sharon Pomerantz stated that the author "assumes real intelligence" in the book's audience.

== Background ==
The author attended the University of Minnesota and, in 1998, received a Master of Fine Arts (MFA) from that institution.

== Reception ==
Michiko Kakutani wrote that the work is "the debut of a delightful new voice in American fiction".

Pomerantz stated that she perceived of the book's ending as "a complete surprise". Kirkus Reviews stated that the book has "Lots of admirable writing". Publishers Weekly stated that the book is "adroit but placid".
