= WXW =

WXW, or variant may refer to:

- Westside Xtreme Wrestling (wXw), a German professional wrestling promotion
- World Xtreme Wrestling (WXW), an American professional wrestling promotion
- Waswo X. Waswo, an American photographer
- ISO 639-3 code wxw, which denotes Wardandi, a dialect of the Nyungar language
