= Ellie Campbell (author) =

Pseudonym for two Scottish joint authors

Ellie Campbell is a pseudonym for Scottish-born sisters, Pam Burks and Lorraine Campbell, who have co-authored and published five novels together. Campbell lives in Boulder, Colorado, U.S., while Burks lives in Reigate, Surrey, England. They collaborate by email, Skype and telephone.

== Biography ==
Both sisters were born in Scotland and lived much of their early lives in Edinburgh, Bognor Regis, and London. They wrote short stories independently for many years before deciding to become a writing team. They write women's fiction, mostly set in Britain, featuring humor and romance but their contemporary flawed characters and dramatic situations often revolve around heroines who are slightly older than the average chick lit novel, sometimes married with children or divorced single mothers and with a mystery or even a murder element. They are usually classified as chick lit, satire or mystery categories.

Their first book, How to Survive Your Sisters was originally published by Random House. in 2008, followed by a second, When Good Friends go Bad in 2009. In 2014, the sisters reverted the UK rights and republished both books independently with Across the Pond Press through Amazon. Both novels are also published in Italian and German by Mondadori in Italy, Blanvalet in Germany, and also translated in Serbia.

With their third novel, Looking For La La, - a funny chicklit mystery - Ellie Campbell decided to join the growing ranks of indie authors selling in e-book format as well as paperback through Amazon's KDP program. Looking For La La was followed by a sequel -To Catch A Creeper: a Crouch End Confidential Mystery and in April 2015, they published their fifth book with, Million Dollar Question. Their books frequently appear high in the Amazon bestseller charts in the USA, UK and Australia.

In 2014, How To Survive Your Sisters and Looking For La La were also produced as audiobooks with Audible.com, narrated by Elizabeth Klett and Stevie Zimmerman respectively.

They are a regular presence on social media with Facebook and Twitter
