= Byaah Hamari Bahoo Ka =

Indian television series

- Genre: Drama
- Created by: Aatish Kapadia
- Screenplay by: Swapnil Deshpande; Rajesh Soni; Sneha Desai; Dialogues; Reetlal Pandit
- Story by: Aatish Kapadia; Sonali Jaffar
- Directed by: Aziz Khan; Dipesh Shah; Dhawal Shukla; Hemen Chauhan
- Starring: Shrenu Parikh; Gaurav Khanna (For full cast see Below)
- Theme music composer: Sajjad Ali Chandwani
- Composer: Paresh Shah
- Country of origin: India
- Original language: Hindi
- No. of seasons: 1
- No. of episodes: 129

Production
- Executive producers: Suchita Chauhan; Manoj Pathak
- Producers: Jamnadas Majethia; Aatish Kapadia; Hats Off Productions Pvt. Ltd.
- Cinematography: Vijay Soni
- Editors: Editor(s); Ashok M. Rathod & Ajay Kumar; Online Editor(s); Prashant R. Khandhka
- Camera setup: Multi-camera
- Production company: Hats Off Productions

Original release
- Network: Sony Entertainment Television
- Release: 9 January 2012 – 27 March 2013

Byaah Hamari Bahoo Ka (transl. Wedding of our daughter-in-law) is an Indian television series which aired on Sony Entertainment Television India from 28 May 2012 to 23 November 2012. It starred Shrenu Parikh and Gaurav Khanna .

== Plot ==
The Vaishnav family in Baroda owns the Kanhaiya Dairy Farm. Yashoda, the female head of the family, encounters a poor couple and is impressed with their daughter Rajnibala "Rajni". Yashoda's son Krish falls in love with Rajni at first sight. Rajni and Krish are married in a grand Gujarati ceremony.

Things change as Rajni reveals that she has a son named Aryan born when she was 17 and became falsely involved in a surrogacy racket. Unable to abort the child, she gave him to her childless friend Archana and her husband Yash. However, Archana died shortly after. The family is shocked but accept Rajni anyway.

Aryan discovers that Rajni is his mother and insists on uniting with her. Krish decides to get Rajni married to Yash. In a sudden twist, Rajni quickly turns into an antagonist. She reveals that she plotted to marry Krish so she could take revenge from him. She accuses Krish of having made false promises of marriage to her sister Shikha. The betrayal left Shikha paralysed. Krish denies the allegations and is determined to uncover the real culprit. Meanwhile, Rajni takes control of the Vaishnav house and property and starts mistreating the family.

Yash learns that Krish is innocent but Krish tells him that they are being watched. An unknown man tries to kill Shikha many times and during one attack she gets scared and gets up from her wheelchair thus getting cured. The culprit kills Yash and Krish is revealed to be innocent. Rajni apologises and vows to uncover the truth. Rajni and Krish unite to find the truth and discover that the culprit is Krish's brother Rajan. He was the one who had an affair with Shikha and killed Yash. The family is shocked. Rajan is imprisoned.

Rajni and Krish go for their honeymoon to Mumbai. There they meet a man named Satya and his mother Tuljabai Dolkar. Krish finds her strangely familiar and on prodding she tells him that she worked as a maid at the Vaishnav house. When the Vaishnavs' son Krish and her own son Satya went out swimming, Satya went missing and was presumed drowned. In a fit of anger, Tuljabai kidnapped Krish and brought him to Mumbai and raised him poorly. Thus, Satya is revealed to be the real Krish.

Krish and Rajni return to Baroda with Satya and introduce him as the real Krish. The family immediately accept him. Yashoda reveals that Satya was brought back to the Vaishnavs in an unconscious state but failing to find Tuljabai and the real Krish, they decided to forget the incident and raise Satya as their own son.

Tuljabai arrives in Baroda and gives the Vaishnavs 20 days to spend time with Krish (the real Satya) before she takes him with her. However, after Yashoda saves her life in a minor fire, Tuljabai forgives the Vaishnavs and decides everyone should live together as a family. She celebrates Krish and Rajni's wedding with customs from her own Marathi culture and decides to return to Mumbai. Krish and Rajni enter the Vaishnav house with new hopes and dreams for a happy family life.

== Cast ==
- Shrenu Parikh as Rajnibala Gopikishan Vaishnav, Krish's wife
- Gaurav Khanna as Gopikishan Vaishnav / the real Satya
- Prateeksha Lonkar as Yashoda Vrajlal Vaishnav, Krish's mother
- Aksan Tripathi as Vrajlal Vaishnav, Krish's father
- Falguni Desai as Devaki Mangal Kumar Vaishnav, Krish's grandmother
- Trishikha Tripathi as Namita Vaishnav, Krish's younger sister
- Anurag Sharma as Rajan Gandhi
- Leena Shah as Surbhi Vaishnav / Surbhi Rajan Gandhi, Krish's elder sister; Rajan's wife
- Sarita Joshi as Tuljabai Dolkar
- Hastakshar Jhulan / Unknown as Vishal Gandhi
- Aadesh Chaudhary as Satya (the real Krish)
- Benaf Dadachandji as Paulomi Chopra
- Dolly Minhas as Avantika Chopra
- Leena Balodi as Uma Trishulbhai Makwana
- Aanjjan Srivastav as Trishulbhai Bhavinbhai Makwana
- Rita Sachdeva as Ruchika Trishulbhai Makwana
- Yash Tonk as Yash Purohit
- Tushar Kapadia as Praveen
- Parul Chaudhary as Archana Yash Purohit, Rajnibala's elder sister
- Gaurav Sharma as Akash
- Menaka Lalwani as Nupur (special appearance in Episode 4)
