= Sandeep Khare =

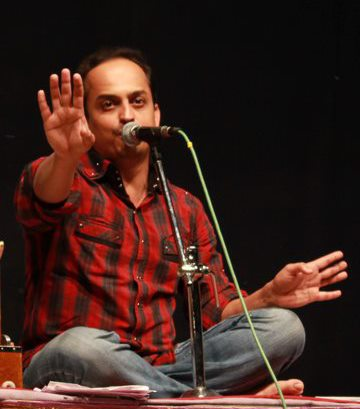

Background information
- Born: 13 May 1973 (age 53); Pune, Maharashtra, India
- Genres: Marathi poetry, Marathi music
- Occupations: Singer–songwriter, Actor, poet, copywriter
- Years active: 1996–present

Sandeep Khare is a Marathi poet, performing artist, actor, singer-songwriter, copywriter from Pune. So far he has published 3 of his books which are poetry collections, namely, 'Kadhi He..Kadhi Te..', 'Maunachi Bhashantare' (The translations of the Silences).

His songs have been sung by many notable Indian singers such as Salil Kulkarni, Shreya Ghoshal, Sunidhi Chauhan, Bela Shende, Shailesh Ranade etc.

He has diploma in electrical engineering from Govt. Polytechnic, Pune. He is married to Sonia and the couple has a daughter named Roomani Khare.

== Poetry collections ==
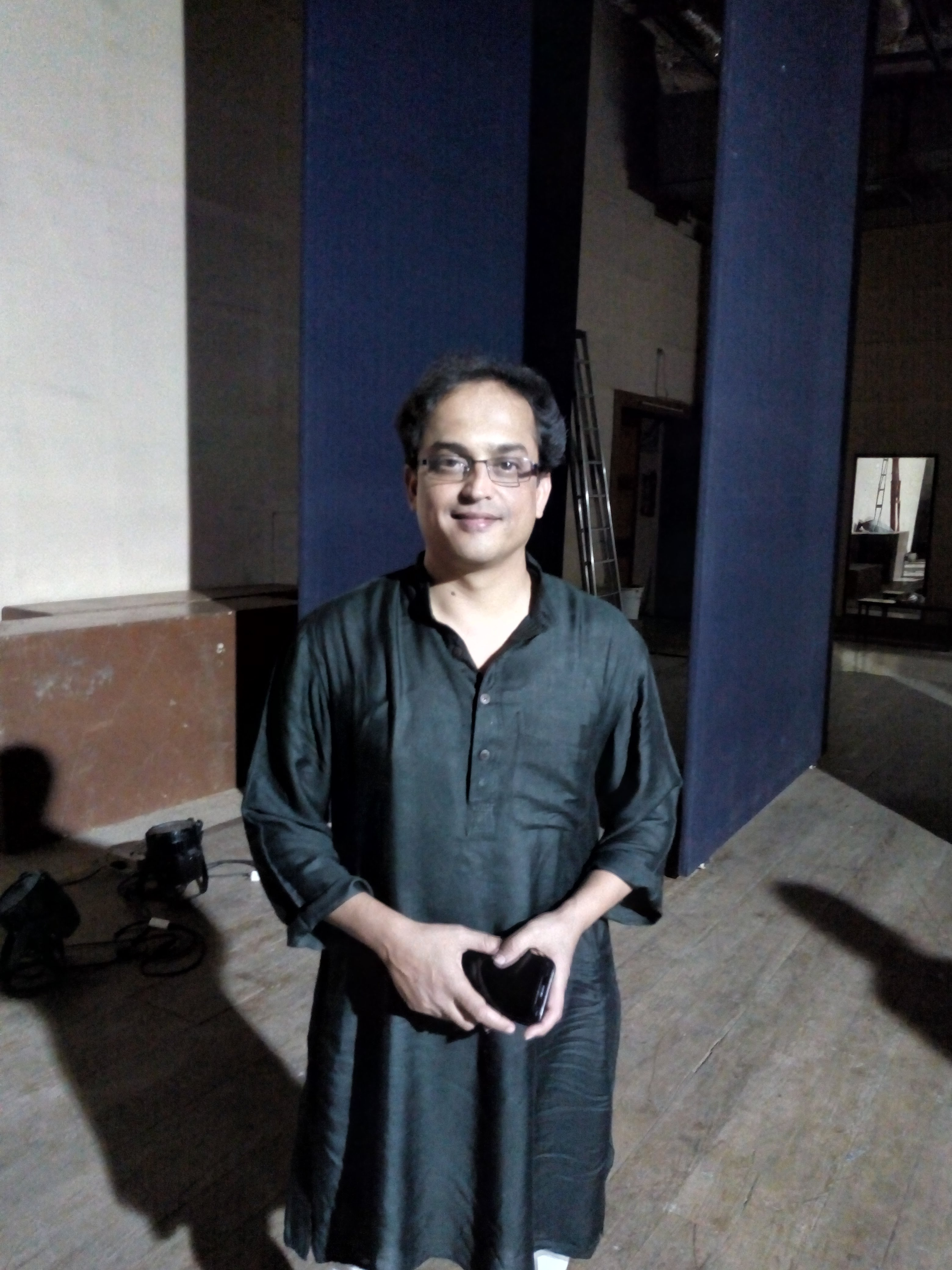
Sandeep Khare

- Kadhi He Kadhi Te
- Maunachi Bhashantare
- Nenivechi Akshare
- Ayushyavar Bolu Kahi
- Tuzyavarachya Kavita

== Discography ==
=== Diwas Ase Ki ===
Diwas Ase Ki was released in 1998.

- Lyrics & Music : Sandeep Khare
- Singers : Shailesh Ranade & Sandeep Khare

Songs from Diwas Ase Ki:

- Track 01/09 : Man Talyat Malyat – Shailesh Ranade
- Track 02/09 : Swar Tipecha – Shailesh Ranade
- Track 03/09 : Diwas Ase Ki – Shailesh Ranade
- Track 04/09 : Sarivar Sar – Sandeep Khare
- Track 05/09 : Majha Bolna..Majha Chalna – Shailesh Ranade
- Track 06/09 : Kase Sartil Saye – Sandeep Khare
- Track 07/09 : Kshitijacha Par – Shailesh Ranade
- Track 08/09 : Sairabhira Zala Sara Vara – Shailesh Ranade
- Track 09/09 : Evdach Na – Sandeep Khare

=== Me Gato Ek Gane ===
Me Gato Ek Gane was released in 2000.

Songs from Me Gato Ek Gane:

- Wishwarambha Pasun Yethe – Sandeep Khare
- Me Gato Ek Gane – Sandeep Khare
- Ratra Sundar...Chandra Sundar – Sandeep Khare
- Yein Swapnat – Sandeep Khare
- Ghet Nirop Nabhacha – Shailesh Ranade
- Halu Halu Tiney Mala – Shailesh Ranade
- Chala Rey Majha – Shailesh Ranade
- Mana Hoi Megh Weda – Sandeep Khare

==== With Salil Kulkarni ====
===== Ayushyawar Bolu Kahi =====
This debut album with Salil Kulkarni was released in 2003. Music and lyrics were by Sandeep Khare.

Songs from Ayushyawar Bolu Kahi:

- Track 01/08 : Ayushyawar Bolu Kahi – Sandeep Khare & Salil Kulkarni
- Track 02/08 : He Bhalte Avaghad Aste – Sandeep Khare & Salil Kulkarni
- Track 03/08 : Pratyekachi Ratra Thodi Aatun Aatun Vedi – Sandeep Khare & Salil Kulkarni
- Track 04/08 : Nasates Ghari Tu Jevha – Salil Kulkarni
- Track 05/08 : Mi Morcha Nela Nahi Mi Samphi Kela Nahi – Sandeep Khare
- Track 06/08 : Aatasha Ase He Mala Kaay Hote – Salil Kulkarni
- Track 07/08 : Saheb Mhanto Chepen Chepen – Sandeep Khare & Salil Kulkarni
- Track 08/08 : Ved Lagla Mala Ved Lagla – Sandeep Khare

===== Namanjoor =====
- Music: Sandeep Khare
- Lyrics: Sandeep Khare
- Singers: Salil Kulkarni & Sandeep Khare

Songs from Namanjoor:

- Track 01/08 : Tujhya Majhya Save – Salil Kulkarni
- Track 02/08 : Me Hajar Chintanni – Sandeep Khare
- Track 03/08 : Ajun Tari Rool Sodun – Sandeep Khare & Salil Kulkarni
- Track 04/08 : Megh Nasta Veej Nasta – Sandeep Khare
- Track 05/08 : Kitik Halave – Salil Kulkarni
- Track 06/08 : Deva Mala – Sandeep Khare
- Track 07/08 : Atasha Me – Salil Kulkarni
- Track 08/08 : Namanjoor – Sandeep Khare & Salil Kulkarni

===== Sang Sakhya Re =====
- Music: Salil Kulkarni
- Music Arrangement: Kamlesh Bhadkamkar and Mithilesh Patankar
- Singers: Sandeep Khare and Salil Kulkarni

Songs from Sang Sakhya Re:

- Track 01/11 : Paus Asa Runazunata – Salil Kulkarni
- Track 02/11 : Priye Ye Nighoni – Sandeep Khare & Salil Kulkarni
- Track 03/11 : Hee Tarunai – Salil Kulkarni
- Track 04/11 : Tuzhe Ni Maaze Naate Kaay – Salil Kulkarni
- Track 05/11 : Tutale – Salil Kulkarni
- Track 06/11 : Saang Sakhya Re – Salil Kulkarni
- Track 07/11 : Alcohol – Sandeep Khare
- Track 08/11 : Nako Oadh Laavun Ghevu Oonhachi – Sandeep Khare & Salil Kulkarni
- Track 09/11 : Laagte Anaam Oadh – Salil Kulkarni
- Track 10/11 : Ajoon Ujadat Naahi Ga – Salil Kulkarni
- Track 11/11 : Vyartha He Saarech Taho – Sandeep Khare

===== Aggobai Dhaggobai =====
- Music: Sandeep Khare and Salil Kulkarni
- Singers: Sandeep Khare, Salil Kulkarni, Anjali Kulkarni

Songs from Aggobai Dhaggobai:

- Aggobai Dhaggobai – Sandeep Khare and Salil Kulkarni
- Mungibai – Sandeep Jhare& Chorous
- Me Pappancha Dhapun phone – Sandeep Khare & Saleel Kulkarni
- Boom Boom Ba – Sandeep Khare and Salil Kulkarni
- Dur deshi gela baba – Salil Kulkarni
- Superman – Sandeep & Saleel
- Babachi Vyatha – Sandeep Khare and Salil Kulkarni

===== Dipadi Dipang =====
- Music:Saleel Kulkarni
- Singers: Sandeep Khare and Salil Kulkarni, Vaishali Made, Vibhavari Apate, Anjali kulkarni, Avadoot Gupte
- Dipadi Dipang – Anjali Kulkarni & Saleel Kulkarni
- He Gandhit Vaare – Saleel Kulkarni
- Khsanaat Lapoon – Saleel Kulkarni
- Yala Kar Phone – Sandeep Khare
- Sakhe Kase Saang Tula – Saleel Kulkarni
- Premat Mhane – Sandeep & Vibhavari apte
- Bara Navha – Sandeep & Vaishali made
- Yala Kar Phone (Karaoke)

===== Damalelya Babanchi Kahani =====
Damalelya Babanchi Kahani was released in 2010. They sang this song for the first time on their 500th performance on Zee Marathi.

Songs from Damalelya Babanchi Kahani:

- Damalelya Babanchi Kahani – Sandeep Khare, Saleel Kulkarni
- Bandh Manache – Sandeep Khare, Saleel Kulkarni
- Challay Kaay – Sandeep, Saleel Kulkarni
- Ikkad Raja, Tikkad Raja – Sandeep Khare, Saleel, Kamalakar
- Jaab Tula Re Kuni Pusava – Sandeep Khare, Saleel Kulkarni
- Kon Dete Kon Dete – Sandeep, Saleel Kulkarni
- Mi Phaslo Mhanuni – Sandeep, Saleel Kulkarni
- Vanvaa – Sunidhi Chauhan

===== Hrudaya Madhale Gaane =====
Hrudaya Madhale Gaane was released in 2009. singer:[Bela Shende] Music: Salil Kulkarni

Songs from Hrudaya Madhale Gaane

- Hrudaya Madhale Gaane
- Jantar Mantar
- Majhya Mana re
- Nilya
- Durnabhachya Palyad
- Rati Ardhya Rati
- Tujhya Vina Sakhya

==== With Madhuri Purandare ====
===== Kadhi He Kadhi Te =====
Kadhi He Kadhi Te released in 2003 was a set of twin albums.

Songs from Kadhi He:

- Kadhi Hey...Kadhi Tey – Sandeep Khare
- Ti Ruslelya – Sandeep Khare
- Rey Fulanchi – Sandeep Khare
- Sahaj Kadhi – Madhuri Purandare
- Konitari Bolavtai – Sandeep Khare
- Kalu dey Dolyanchi Bhasha – Madhuri Purandare
- He Nashib – Sandeep Khare
- Harlyasarkhe Chalaiche – Sandeep Khare

Songs from Kadhi Te:

- Wede Haiku – Sandeep Khare
- Don Haat Don Pai (Khaparpanjobancha gane) – Sandeep Khare
- Maunibaba – Sandeep Khare
- Rengalat Rengalat – Sandeep Khare
- Ha Pyala Shevatcha – Sandeep Khare
- Lagbag Lagbag – Sandeep Khare
- Dishach Disha Hya – Madhuri Purandare
- Lahi Lahi Unh Unh – Sandeep Khare

== Filmography ==
- All plays and films are in Marathi, unless mentioned otherwise.

=== Stage Plays ===
==== Ayushawar Bolu Kahi ====
This stage show has more than 1000 performances around the world. Sandeep and Saleel have had several performances in the US, UK, Dubai, and Australia. They performed on the last day of "Vishwa Marathi Sahitya Sammelan" at San Jose, USA.

==== Kadhitari Vedyagat ====
It's a stage presentation of the poems done in theatrical style without any prose but only with poetry. Performers: Sandeep, Madhura Velankar, and Amruta Subhash/Vibhavari Deshpande.

=== Feature films ===
| Year | Title | Roles | Notes |
|---|---|---|---|
| 2009 | Nishani Dava Angatha | | |
| 2009 | Hai Kai Nai Kai | | |
| 2010 | Haapus | | |
| 2015 | Bioscope | | |
| 2019 | Thackeray | Manohar Joshi | |
| 2022 | Athang | Tamhankar Master | Planet Marathi OTT |
