= Anurag Sharma (actor) =

Indian television actor (born 1978)

- Born: 6 February 1978 (age 48); Allahabad, Uttar Pradesh, India
- Years active: 2004–present
- Spouse: Nandini Gupta (m. 2020)

Anurag Sharma (born 6 February 1978) is an Indian television actor, originally from Prayagraj (Allahabad) who has acted mainly in Balaji Telefilms, known for having played Satish Deshpande in Zee TV's Pavitra Rishta and Param Khurana in Star Plus's Yeh Hai Mohabbatein. He appeared in Tere Liye as Sushant and Byaah Hamari Bahoo Ka as Rajan Gandhi. He appeared in episodes of Adaalat, Hum Ne Li Hai... Shapath and Yeh Hai Aashiqui. He married Nandini Gupta in 2020.

He also played the role of Maharana Pratap in Jodha Akbar and Elder Vanraj (King of Gujarat) in Dharti Ka Veer Yodha Prithviraj Chauhan.

== Television ==
| Year | Serial | Role |
|---|---|---|
| 2009–2011 | Pavitra Rishta | Satish Deshpande |
| 2010–2011 | Tere Liye | Sushant Rajshekhar |
| 2012 | Byaah Hamari Bahoo Ka | Rajan Gandhi |
| 2013 | Adaalat | Abhay Kumar Ahlawat / Kedar |
| 2013 | Hum Ne Li Hai... Shapath | Machine man |
| 2013–2015 | Jodha Akbar | Maharana Pratap |
| 2014 | Yeh Hai Aashiqui | Prateek Bose |
| 2014 | Ajeeb Dastaan Hai Yeh | Sandeep Mehra |
| 2014–2019 | Ye Hai Mohabbatein | Parmeet "Param" Khurana |
| 2014–2020 | Kumkum Bhagya | Raj Mehra |
| 2015 | Itna Karo Na Mujhe Pyaar | Ram Kapoor "RK" |
| 2015 | Kuch Toh Hai Tere Mere Darmiyaan | Rudranil "Rudra" Nagrath |
| 2016 | Kavach...Kaali Shaktiyon Se | Shakti Shah |
| 2019 | Udaan | Jatin Shroff |
| 2021–2023 | Nath – Zewar Ya Zanjeer | Ramesh Singh Thakur |
| 2023–2024; 2025 | Doree | Anand Thakur |
| 2024 | Chhathi Maiyya Ki Bitiya | Shamsher |
| 2024–2025 | Prem Leela | Anshuman Singh Chaudhary |
| 2026 | Hui Gumm Yaadein Ek Doctor, Do Zindagiyaan | Dr. Sunny Kapoor |

=== Special appearances ===
| Year | Title | Role |
|---|---|---|
| 2024 | Suhaagan: Ke Rang Jashn Ke Rang | Anand Thakur |
