= Kshan Amrutache =

Kshan Amrutache क्षण अमृताचे

Studio album by Saleel Kulkarni Lata Mangeshkar
- Released: 2013
- Recorded: Times Music
- Genre: Bhaavgeete
- Length: 32.43 Minutes
- Label: L.M. Music

Kshan Amrutache (Marathi: क्षण अमृताचे) is a Marathi album by Saleel Kulkarni & Lata Mangeshkar. The album was released on 7 July 2013 at Yashwantrao Chavan Stadium, Kothrud, Pune. The album was released by Pt. Hridaynath Mangeshkar. Saleel Kulkarni stated that it was his dream to work with Lata Mangeshkar.

The lyrics, written by various acclaimed poets, explore themes of time, memory, love, and life’s fleeting moments. The title Kshan Amrutache, which translates to “Moments of Nectar,” reflects the emotional and poetic depth of the songs.

This album holds a special place in Marathi music as it marked one of Lata Mangeshkar’s rare later-life collaborations in the non-film music space. Her timeless voice, combined with Kulkarni’s sensitive compositions, received widespread praise from critics and audiences alike. The album was celebrated not only for its musical excellence but also for bringing together two generations of artists in a heartfelt musical experience.

Kshan Amrutache was released under the Strum Entertainment label and remains a cherished work in the Marathi music community.

== Track listing ==
All songs were written by Marathi poet Balakrishna Bhagwant Borkar and music also is composed by Saleel Kulkarni.

No.	Title	Singer(s)	Length
1	Mazya Kaani Bai	Saleel Kulkarni	4:30
2	Tu Raha Ashich Dur	Saleel Kulkarni	5:10
3	Aata Visavyache Kshan	Lata Mangeshkar	5:19
4	Nako Karu Sakhi Asa	Saleel Kulkarni	5:48
5	Kadhi Majhi Kadhi Tyachi Hi Saavali	Saleel Kulkarni	5:04
6	Sandhiprakashat	Lata Mangeshkar	6:52
