= Rajashree (novelist) =

Indian novelist and film-maker

- Occupations: Novelist & Film-maker
- Writing career
- Genres: Chick lit, Romantic comedy, Drama
- Notable works: Novel: Trust Me; Film: The Rebel
- Notable awards: National Award
- Website: www.rajashree.in

Rajashree is an Indian novelist and film-maker. She has been working in the Mumbai film industry after studying film direction at the Film and Television Institute of India. She has written and directed a film, The Rebel, which won a National Award in the Best Short Fiction Film category at the 43rd National Film Awards. The jury presented the award "for showing an adolescent's journey to maturity and his coming to terms with his mother." The film was screened at many film festivals. She has made a film about communal violence called The Connection.

Her critically acclaimed debut, Trust Me, is the biggest-selling Indian chick lit novel. It is set in Bollywood, the Mumbai film industry, and uses the narrative structure of a 'masala' Bollywood film.

She currently lives and works in Mumbai, India.

== See also ==
- List of Indian writers
