= Rakesh Vijay =

Rajasthani miniaturist

- Born: Rakesh Vijayvargiya; 22 March 1970 (age 56); Udaipur, India
- Known for: painter

Rakesh Vijay (22 March 1970), professionally known as R. Vijay, is a Rajasthani miniaturist best known for his collaborative work with American artist Waswo X. Waswo. R. Vijay received little formal training and his miniature painting style has been described as naïve, though his works have drawn attention and praise from various critics throughout India.

Early in life Rakesh was tutored by traditional miniaturists such as Sukhdev Singh Sisodiya and Laxmi Narayan Sikaligar. Later he developed his own style, which has been called an eclectic mix of Persian and Mogul styles, along with a bit of the Company School of Indo-British art. The artist also takes inspiration from his great-uncle Ram Gopal Vijayvargia, a well-known Rajasthani miniaturist who had practiced his art in Jaipur, and became widely acclaimed in India not only for his paintings but also for his many short stories published in Hindi.

In 2004 R.Vijay began doing collaborative work with the American Waswo X. Waswo. Taking concepts suggested by Waswo, Vijay creates a series of miniatures that depict a foreigner's life in India, complete with a wide variety of emotions and predicaments. In this collaborative work the two artists pull together an extremely disparate collection of cultural references, from both the East and the West. The two artists take joint credit for this body of work, with R. Vijay signing each painting and Waswo embossing his initials. This work has been exhibited along with the collaborations Waswo has done with photographic hand-colorist Rajesh Soni under the exhibition title "A Studio in Rajasthan".
