= Doghi =

- Doghi poster
- Directed by: Sumitra Bhave, Sunil Sukthankar
- Written by: Sumitra Bhave (also dialogue)
- Screenplay by: Sumitra Bhave
- Story by: Sumitra Bhave
- Produced by: NFDC, Doordarshan
- Starring: Renuka Daftadar, Sonali Kulkarni, Uttara Baokar, Sadashiv Amrapurkar, Madhu Kambikar, Suryakant Mandhare
- Cinematography: Charudatta Dukhande
- Edited by: Sumitra Bhave, Sunil Sukthankar
- Music by: Anand Modak, Namdeo Dhondo Mahanor (lyrics)
- Release date: 1995
- Running time: 141 minutes
- Country: India
- Language: Marathi

Doghi (transl. Two Sisters) is a 1995 Indian Marathi film directed by filmmaker duo Sumitra Bhave–Sunil Sukthankar and produced by National Film Development Corporation of India in association with Doordarshan. The film won three awards at the 43rd National Film Awards in 1995; the Best Film on Other Social Issues, the Best Female Playback Singer, and a Special Mention for Uttara Baokar and nine awards including the Best Film at 32nd Maharashtra State Film Awards in 1996.

== Plot ==
The oldest of two sisters, Gauri (Renuka Daftadar), is getting married and there is festivity in the household. Elders of the village advise her to visit a temple before the groom arrives. Accompanied by her younger sister, Krishna,(Sonali Kulkarni) and her uncle (Sadashiv Amrapurkar), notices on the way back, in the newspaper, that groom's family had met with a fatal accident while coming to the village.

Gauri and Krishna's father (Suryakant Mandhare) is paralysed by the shocking news. The villagers shun Gauri as an ill omen. Soon, the family faces financial troubles, so they attempt to till their piece of infertile land to get some money. When nothing works out, their mother (Uttara Baokar) asks her brother to take Gauri to Mumbai for a job. Initially hesitant, he agrees but only on the condition her mother not ask any further questions about Gauri's whereabouts in the future.

Gauri's uncle forces her into prostitution and she starts sending money to her family every month. Things get better for the family and her uncle finds a groom for Krishna, a young idealist, Shesh Waghmare (Abhay Kulkarni), working with an NGO. Gauri visits the village for Krishna's marriage but their mother does not allow her to take part in any activities because of Gauri's unfortunate marriage incident and her way of earning money.

When Krishna discovers this, she questions their mother and convinces her to accept Gauri. When Gauri decides to leave the wedding ceremony and the village, Shesh's activist friend, Nivrutti Kamble (Sunil Sukthankar), proposes to her, in spite of knowing her past. Gauri stays in the village, never to return to her life as a prostitute in Mumbai.

== Cast ==
- Renuka Daftadar as Gauri
- Sonali Kulkarni as Krishna
- Uttara Baokar as mother
- Suryakant Mandhare as father
- Sadashiv Amrapurkar as uncle
- Madhu Kambikar as aunty
- Abhay Kulkarni as Shesh Waghmare
- Sunil Sukthankar as Nivrutti Kamble

== Music ==
- "Nagpanchamiche Sana Bai" (part 1) - Anjali Kulkarni, Shilpa Datar
- "Phalgun Mas Yeta" - Madhuri Purandare
- "Ithe Aalo Hoto" - Keshav Badge
- "Jhoka Jato Aakashala" - Madhuri Purandare, Shilpa Datar
- "Nagpanchamiche Sana Bai" (part 2) - Anjali Kulkarni, Shilpa Datar
- 'Aandhali Shraddha Jite Titaliya" - Tyagraj Khadilkar, Mukund Phansalkar
- "Bhui Bhegalali Khol" - Anjali Kulkarni
- "Bhau Sange Bahinila Ga" - Parth Umrani, Shilpa Datar
- "Sheth Dhanyana Datali" - Madhuri Purandare

== Production ==
The film marked the directorial feature film debut for Sumitra Bhave and Sunil Sukthankar. While working on a short film Bai (1985), Sukthankar joined Bhave as an assistant. Later, they worked on several short films together. After watching one of their short film Chakori (1992), the National Film Development Corporation of India (NFDC) invited Bhave and Sukthankar to make Doghi. The film was eventually produced by NFDC in association with Doordarshan. The director Umesh Vinayak Kulkarni worked as an assistant director for the film.

== Reception ==
Reviewing the film at the Indian Panorama section of the International Film Festival of India, S. R. Ashok Kumar of The Hindu pwrote that "A small story made into a good film".

The Hindi movie Laaga Chunari Mein Daag was inspired by Doghi.

== Awards ==
It won three awards at the 43rd National Film Awards in 1995. The film was awarded the Best Film on Other Social Issues "for its depiction of poverty-stricken rural family consisting of two young sisters" and depicting "the agony of survival in a tradition bound hostile society and their subsequent liberation". Anjali Marathe was awarded the Best Female Playback Singer "for her melodious and heart rendering song ["Bhui Bhegalali Khol"] expressing the aridness of life" and Uttara Baokar won a Special Mention "for her sensitive portrayal of the agony of a mother in the midst of poverty and honour".

The film won nine awards including the Best Film at 32nd Maharashtra State Film Awards in 1996. It was awarded Best Actress, Best Supporting Actor, Best Script, Best Story, Best Music, Best Songs, Best Female Playback Singer, and Best Art Director. Bhave and Sukthankar were awarded as the Best Director at the 1997 Kalnirnay Award. Sonali Kulkarni won the Best Actress Award at the Filmfare Marathi Awards and the film was awarded the Grand Jury Prize at Cinema Delle Donne Italy in 1996.
