= Trust Me (novel) =

2006 novel by Rajashree

- Author: Rajashree
- Cover artist: Chetan Sharma
- Language: English
- Genre: Chick lit, Romance, comedy
- Publisher: Rupa
- Publication date: 2006
- Publication place: India
- Media type: Print (Paperback)
- Pages: 242 pages
- ISBN: 81-291-0983-2
- OCLC: 123080104
- LC Class: MLCM 2006/00439 (P) PR9499.4.R28

Trust Me is one of the best-selling Indian chick lit novels. Written by Indian novelist Rajashree, it is set in Bollywood, the Bombay film industry, and uses the narrative structure of a masala Bollywood film.

== Explanation of the novel's title ==
The title of Trust Me comes from an old joke that is quoted in the novel:

'You didn't let me open your hand in the beginning, and even when you did, you opened it very slowly – that shows that you don't trust easily,' he said. 'You're too closed as a person. Open up, you'll enjoy life more.'

I took my hand back from him and lit a cigarette.

'Do you know what "trust me" means in Polish?' I asked.

He shook his head.

'What?'

"'Fu*k you.'"

He laughed. I smiled.

'So, when a guy says "trust me",' I said to him, a warning bell rings in my head.'

He made a face. 'Why are you so hard, so defensive?'

'Have to be, living in Bombay, alone.'

== Plot summary ==
Set against the backdrop of the Hindi film industry, Trust Me is a novel that explores themes of love, heartbreak, and friendship. The story follows the protagonist Parvati who, after being dumped by her boyfriend, decides to distance herself from romantic relationships. She begins to believe her friends' assertion that men are untrustworthy. Parvati's boss, Mr. Bose, whom she views as a fatherly figure, becomes her confidant. However, when he makes an unexpected advance, Parvati reassesses her perspective, further reinforcing her disillusionment with men. Her friends, while supportive, refrain from saying, "I told you so."

Parvati leaves her job and joins the film unit of 'Jambuwant' "Call Me Jumbo!" Sinha, assisting him in the production of his latest Hindi feature film. Jumbo embodies the stereotypical traits of a Bombay filmmaker, with a penchant for flamboyant style, questionable finances, and dubious casting practices. Manoj, the chief assistant, has a reputation for making advances towards every woman he encounters, rationalizing it as a way to ensure no one feels overlooked. Meanwhile, Rahul, an actor in the film, expresses romantic interest in Parvati.

Despite her hopes that her experiences have made her wiser, Parvati finds herself developing a strong and inconvenient affection for Rahul.

== Literary significance and reception ==
Geordie Greig, editor, Tatler, and former literary editor, Sunday Times called Trust Me 'a most enjoyable read.' Kiran Nagarkar, author, Cuckold, said, 'Rajashree... has a genuine comic talent.' Michele Roberts, author and former Man Booker judge, said about the book, "A feminist romance set in the Bombay film industry. Terrific story. Loved the humour."

The book was received enthusiastically by magazines like Femina who said, "Looking for an exciting chick-lit book with a twist? Then you simply will not be able to resist Trust Me by Rajashree." Marie Claire said, "In this lighthearted debut, Rajashree balances comic and sad moods perfectly. A fun read!" Cosmopolitan said, "A weekend must-read for every chick-lit lover. Go get it!"

The book sold 25,000 copies in the first month after its release. Its popularity can be seen in the context of the rise of regional varieties of chick-lit. An Indian chick-lit, sometimes known as 'ladki-lit' exists.

In an interview with the New York Times, Helen Fielding said, "I think it had far more to do with zeitgeist than imitation." If the chick lit explosion has "led to great new female writers emerging from Eastern Europe and India, then it's worth any number of feeble bandwagon jumpers." Sunaina Kumar wrote in the Indian Express, "Ten years after the publication of Bridget Jones's Diary, the genre of fiction most recognizable for its pink cover art of stilettos, martini glasses, and lipsticks, is now being colorfully infused with bindis, saris, and bangles."

== Publication history ==
- 2006, India, Rupa, ISBN 81-291-0983-2, Paperback
