= Journal of Popular Romance Studies =

- Discipline: Cultural
- Language: English
- Edited by: Amy Burge

Publication details
- History: 2010–present
- Publisher: International Association for the Study of Popular Romance
- Frequency: Annual
- Open access: Yes
- License: Creative Commons Attribution-NonCommercial 4.0 International License

Standard abbreviations
- ISO 4: J. Pop. Roman. Stud.

Indexing
- ISSN: 2159-4473
- LCCN: 2011202200
- OCLC no.: 892516834

Links
- Journal homepage; Online archive

The Journal of Popular Romance Studies is a peer-reviewed open access academic journal published by the International Association for the Study of Popular Romance. It was established in 2010 and until 2016, two issues were published each year. From 2017 onwards, a single issue is published yearly. The journal covers the study of popular romance media, including romance novels, chick lit, romantic comedy films, dating culture, and love songs. The journal also publishes reviews of recently published academic books, notes and queries, and long and short pieces on university teaching of popular romance media and culture.

In addition, the journal regularly publishes special issues, focusing on particular authors (e.g. Jennifer Crusie), genres or themes (e.g. Black Romance), or notable works (e.g. E.M. Hull's The Sheik).

== Abstracting and indexing ==
The journal is abstracted and indexed in the Directory of Open Access Journals, Modern Language Association Database, and is listed in Scopus and ERIH PLUS.

== Francis Award ==
The journal hosts an annual essay award sponsored by the International Association for the Study of Popular Romance, the Francis Award, for the best unpublished essay on popular romance media or romantic love in global popular culture. It is named in memory of Consuela Francis, associate provost and professor of English and African American Studies at the College of Charleston. The author of the winning essay receives a $250 prize, and has the option to publish their submission in the journal.
