= Saleel Kulkarni =

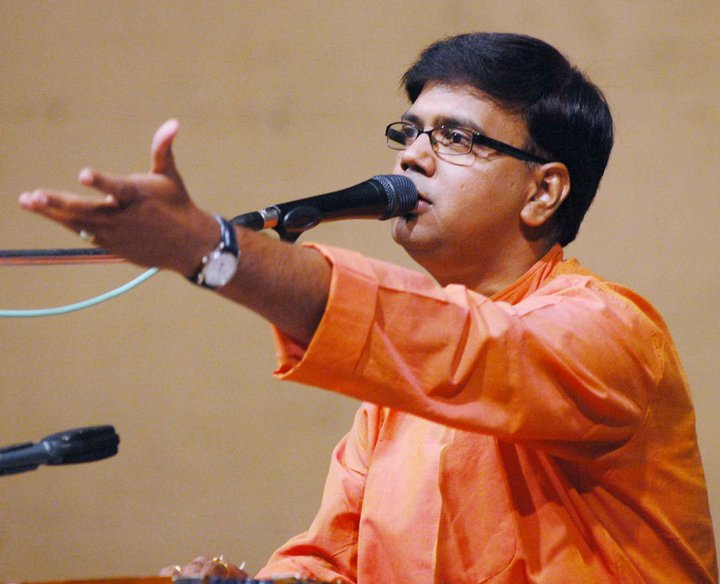

Background information
- Born: 6 October 1972 (age 54); Pune, Maharashtra, India
- Genres: Soundtracks, albums, movie, light music
- Occupations: Singer, Music Director, Film Director, Poet, Writer
- Years active: 1996–present

Saleel Kulkarni (Marathi pronunciation: [saliːl kulkəɾɳiː]; 6 October 1972) is a Marathi music composer, singer, author and director.

== Early life ==
Saleel Kulkarni sang the Marathi Prose 'Jayostute' on All India Radio, Pune station at the age of three. Thereafter, he undertook key lessons in singing and music from eminent personalities like Gangadharbuva Pimpalkhare, Jaymalabai Shiledar, and Pramod Marathe. Kulkarni graduated in medicine and practiced for a while before turning to music. While working as a music director for several years, he has composed songs for Hindi and Marathi albums, television serials, and films.

== Musical associations ==
As a singer, Saleel Kulkarni has rendered his voice for many composers for albums and shows. Some of the artists that have sung/recorded for Kulkarni include Bela Shende, Shankar Mahadevan, Hariharan, Shreya Ghoshal, Sandeep Khare, Hrishikesh Ranade, Suvarna Mategaonkar, Shubha Joshi, Madhura Datar, Vibhavari Apte Joshi, Avadhoot Gupte. Saleel played Judge for the competitive singing reality show "Sa Re Ga Ma Pa" on Zee Marathi where, along with assessing the performances of participants, he mentored and nurtured many upcoming talented individuals. He has also written columns in a leading Marathi daily. He is the author of a maiden book "Lapavalelya Kaacha" Saleel runs a Music School in Pune.

=== Ayushyawar Bolu Kahi (आयुष्यावर बोलू काही) (Musical Program) ===
Saleel Kulkarni teamed up with Sandip Khare for the show 'Ayushyawar Bolu Kahi' (आयुष्यावर बोलू काही). Kulkarni was also a part of Marathi SaReGaMaPa as a judge and mentor. He has performed in musical concerts in the UK, US, Singapore, Switzerland, and Shanghai.

=== Maitra Jeevanche(Musical Program) ===
He is doing selected shows with veteran music director Hridaynath Mangeshkar for the program 'Maitra Jeevanche' (मैत्र जीवांचे). After a long break of almost 12 years, Lata Mangeshkar sang Marathi bhavgeeta when she recorded songs with him as a music director for the album "Kshan Amrutache".

=== Feature films ===
- Ek Unad Divas (Marathi)
- Jana Gana Mana
- Jameen (Marathi)
- Champion (Marathi)
- Ata Kashyala Udyachi Baat (Marathi)
- Dhaage Dore (Marathi)
- Chodo Kal Ki batein (Hindi)
- Nishani Dava Angatha (Marathi)
- Vitthal Vitthal (Marathi)
- Pandhar (Marathi)
- Chintoo (Marathi)
- Chintoo 2 (Marathi)
- Chakwa ( Marathi )
- Bandya Ani Baby ( Marathi )
- Haay Kaay, Naay Kay (Marathi )
- Anandi Anand ( Marathi )
- Housefull ( Marathi )
- BIOSCOPE ( 4 SHORTFILMS )
- Monkey Baat ( Marathi )
- Wedding Cha Shinema ( Marathi )
- Ekda Kay Jhala (Marathi)

== Discography ==
| Album title | Language | Year | Singers |
|---|---|---|---|
| Anand Pahat | Marathi | 1999 | Saleel Kulkarni |
| Tarihi Vasant Fulato | Marathi | 1999 | Saleel Kulkarni, Ravindra Sathe, Shrikant Pargaonkar |
| 25 Chhan Chhan Baal Geete | Marathi | 1999 | Saleel Kulkarni and others |
| Ayushyawar Bolu Kahi | Marathi | 2003 | Sandeep Khare Saleel Kulkarni |
| Namanjoor | Marathi | 2005 | Sandeep Khare Saleel Kulkarni |
| Dibadi Dipang | Marathi | 2007 | Sandeep Khare Saleel Kulkarni |
| Sang Sakhya Re | Marathi | 2006 | Sandeep Khare Saleel Kulkarni |
| Sandhiprakashat | Marathi | 2008 | Saleel Kulkarni |
| Hrudayamadhale Gaane | Marathi | 2009 | Bela Shende |
| Damalelya Babachi Kahani | Marathi | 2010 | Sandeep Khare Saleel Kulkarni |
| Kshan Moharate | Marathi | 2008 | Hrishikesh Ranade, Prajakta Ranade |
| Barase Badariya | Marathi | 2008 | Sawni Shende |
| Mazech Geet Mi Gate | Marathi | 2007 | Suvarna Mategaonkar |
| Mazya Mana | Marathi | 2000 | Bela Shende |
| Haribhajan | Marathi | 2007 | Sanjeev Abhyankar |
| Aggobai Dhaggobai | Marathi | 2007 | Sandeep Khare, Saleel Kulkarni, Anjali Kulkarni |
| Aggobai Dhaggobai 2 | Marathi | 2011 | Sandeep Khare, Saleel Kulkarni, Anjali Kulkarni, Shubhankar Kulkarni |
| Kshana Amrutache | Marathi | 2013 | Saleel Kulkarni, Lata Mangeshkar |
| Ja Dile Man Tula | Marathi | 2014 | Saleel Kulkarni, Sandeep Khare |
| Diva Lagu De Re Deva | Marathi | 2015 | Aarya Ambekar |
| Guru, Sakha, Bandhu, Maaybaap | Marathi | 2016 | Saleel Kulkarni |

|Yei ga vitthala| [Marathi]| 2017| |Anand Bhate|

=== Stage shows ===
- Ayushyawar Bolu Kahi (आयुष्यावर बोलू काही)
- Maitra Jeevanche (मैत्र जीवांचे)
- Nakshatranche Dene (नक्षत्रांचे देणे)
- Tarihi Vasant Fulato (तरीही वसंत फुलतो)
- Gaani Manatali (गाणी मनातली)
- Dipadi Dipang (डीपाडी डिपांग)
- Maze Jagane Hote Gane (माझे जगणे होते गाणे)
- Bakibab Ani Mi (बाकीबाब आणि मी)

=== As author ===
In 2010, Saleel Kulkarni had written a fortnightly column 'Musically Yours' for leading Marathi daily Loksatta. The articles got a finishing touch, got some literary treatment by the author, and came out as his maiden book 'Lapawlelya Kacha' (लपवलेल्या काचा). Owing to insistent demands from Marathi readers all over the world, the publication house 'Continental' produced 3rd & 4th editions of the book. Released his second book ‘ Shahanya manasanchi factory ‘ in 2017, which was well received by the readers.

=== As TV show compere ===
Saleel conceived and thematically designed the concept for the weekly show 'Madhali Sutti' (मधली सुट्टी) being telecast on Zee Marathi.

=== As director ===
Saleel Kulkarni directed his maiden venture, Wedding Cha Cinema, which released on 12 April 2019. Saleel has also written the story and screenplay for the movie. He has also directed the movie "Ekda Kaay Jhale" (2022), which won the National award for Best Feature Film.

=== Singles as Music Composer / Singer ===
| Song name | Album name | Singer | Lyricist | Music | Year | Language |
| Aayushya Ek Yatra | Aayushya Ek Yatra | Saleel Kulkarni | U R Giri | | Apr-05 | Marathi |
| Taaryas Ya Kadhicha | Aayushya Ek Yatra | Saleel Kulkarni | Suresh Dwadshiwar | | Apr-05 | Marathi |
| Udu Udu Zalaya | Single | Aanand Shinde | Sameer Sawant | Saleel Kulkarni | Aug-17 | Marathi |
| Baadara Re.... Meera - A Confluence | Single | Saleel Kulkarni, Meghana Sardar, Pradnya Kokil | Traditional | Saleel Kulkarni | Oct-17 | Hindi |
| Gaayeja | Single | Kaushiki Chaktraborty, Mahesh Kale | Sameer Sawant | Saleel Kulkarni | Nov-17 | Hindi |
| Un Lagale | Single | Devaki Pandit | Grace | Saleel Kulkarni | Jun-18 | Marathi |
| Sur Nave String | Single | Aashish Kulkarni, Akshay Anamkar, Shreya Kharabe, Deepanshi Nagar | Sandeep Khare | Saleel Kulkarni | Jun-18 | Marathi |
| Sur Nave Unplugged | Single | Nishant Phatak, Saurabh Salunkhe, Priya Padalikar, Manali Nerikar | Sandeep Khare | Saleel Kulkarni | Jun-18 | Marathi |
| Ghana Vadan | Single | Rucha Mule Jambhekar | Baa Bha Borkar | Saleel Kulkarni | Jun-18 | Marathi |
| Aaj Sare Mam Ekakipan | Single | Shounak Abhisheki, Rahul Deshpande | Shanta Shelke | Saleel Kulkarni | Jun-18 | Marathi |
| Bhimarupee Maharudra | Single | Kids Chorus | Shri Ramdas Swami | Saleel Kulkarni | Aug-18 | Marathi |
| Ruk Ja Zaalim | Single | Shubhangi Joshi | Sandeep Khare | Saleel Kulkarni | Aug-18 | Marathi |
| Tu Gelyavar Phike Chandane | Single | Saleel Kulkarni | Baa Bha Borkar | Sourabh Bhalerav | Nov-18 | Marathi |

== Personal life ==
Kulkarni was married to National Award-winning singer Anjali Marathe, daughter of singer Anuradha Marathe. He has two children – son Shubhankar Kulkarni who sang in the movie Chintoo (चिंटू), as well as a daughter, Ananya. He later separated from Anjali Marathe.
