= Benaf Dadachandji =

Indian television actress

- Born: 17 August 1987 (age 38); Mumbai, Maharashtra, India
- Occupation: Actress
- Years active: 1996–present
- Spouse: Norman Huo (m. 2019)
- Children: Ivana Huo

Benaf Dadachandji is an Indian actress, working in Hindi television. She is known for her role as Radhika "Baby" Thakkar, a physically disabled young girl, in the TV series Baa Bahoo Aur Baby.

== Early life and career ==
Born in Mumbai, she did her schooling from St. Anne's High School.

Benaf started her career with various advertisements. In 1995, she appeared in Santosh Sivan directed Hindi film Halo as Shasha and then in the 1998 film China Gate as Lali. For her performance in Halo, she received Special Jury Award at the 43rd National Film Awards. The jury presented the certificate award for "her charming and natural performance".

She later started her career in Hindi television industry playing various roles in soaps like Hello Dollie, Baa Bahoo aur Baby, Yeh Moh Moh ke Dhaagey, Jhansi Ki Rani and Choti Bahu 2. In 2012 she appeared as Paulomi in Byah Hamari Bahu Ka. She was most recently seen in the web series Baarish.

== Personal life ==
In February 2019, she married her long time partner Norman Huo. She has a daughter named Ivana born on 18 November 2019.

== Filmography ==
=== Film ===
Year	Title	Role	Notes
1996	Halo	Sasha	
1998	China Gate	Lali	
2014	Bobby Jasoos	Noor	

=== Television ===
Year	Title	Role	Notes
1997	Nazarana	Ishita	Television film
1998	So Let's Yahoo	Herself	
2004–2005	Princess Dollie Aur Uska Magic Bag	Lopa	
2005	Remix	Yamini	
2005–2010	Baa Bahoo Aur Baby	Radhika "Baby" Thakkar	
2007	Ssshhhh...Phir Koi Hai	Shweta	Episode "Maut Ka Chakravyuh"
2009–2011	Jhansi Ki Rani	Ganga	
2011–2012	Chotti Bahu 2	Barkha Vashisht	
2012	Byaah Hamari Bahoo Ka	Paulomi	
2015–2016	Sumit Sambhal Lega	Simran	
2017	Yeh Moh Moh Ke Dhaagey	Saanvi	
2019	Baarish	Zeenia	Web series
2022	Dhadkan Zindaggi Kii	Dr. Aditi Saxena	
2023	Sapnon Ki Chhalaang	Priyal	
2025	Crime Patrol - 26 Jurm 26 Case (Episode- 13-14)	Roshni	
2026	MasterChef India (Season 9)	Contestant	

== Awards ==
Dadachanji has won the following awards:

- 1995 : International Children Film Festival, Hyderabad in Best Child Artist category
- 1996 : 43rd National Film Awards in Special Jury Award category for Halo
- 1997 : Children's Filmfest, New York in Best Artist category for Halo
