= Tushar Kapadia =

Indian actor (born 1969)

- Born: 13 December 1969 (age 56); Rajkot
- Occupation: Actor
- Known for: Aa Family Comedy Che; Byaah Hamari Bahoo Ka
- Notable work: Aa Family Comedy Che

Tushar Kapadia(Gujarati: તુષાર કાપડિયા, Hindi: तुषार कापडिया) is an Indian actor. He is well-known artist of Gujarati Theater world. He is popular nowadays as Mr. Abhyankar Jobanputra among Gujarati people, as he is doing a TV serial named 'Aa Family Comedy Che'. He is active in entertainment world since 1987 and have done more than 30 TV serial as an actor.

== Theater ==
Year	Play	Director
1987	Sambandho Ni Sabiti	Mohan Patel
1989	Raat Rani	Mohan Patel
1989	Vahali Nikki	Mohan Patel
1990	Ekko Duggi	Shailesh Dave
1991	Tashkar Moshali	Shailesh Dave
1991	Takshak (Hindi)	Shailesh Dave
1992	Kankavati	Manubhai Gadhavi
1993	Mallika	Cyrus Dastoor
1994	Chhori Chhel Chhabili	Arvind Vekaria
1995	Jene Aado Vehvaar, Ene Roj Tehvaar	-
1996	Chal Thodu Rami Laiye	Ashok Upadhyay
1997	Pati Anadi, Dewar Khiladi	-
1997	Vatsalya	Kanti Madia
1998	Vaat Madhraat Pachhini	Arvind Vekaria
1999	Babo Aavyo Courier Ma	Vipul Vithlani
2000	Prem No Prime Time	Bhavin Thaker
2009	Kanji V/S Kanji	Umesh Shukla (253 SHOWS)
2010	Prem Chhe, To Parivaar Chhe	-
2015	Mummy V/S Pappa	Jay Kapadia

== Television ==
Year	Show	Character	Channel	Language
2017	Kacho Papad Pako Papad (Web Originals)	Don	SonyLIV	Gujarati
2017	Bakula Bua Ka Bhoot	Jam Saheb	& TV	Hindi
2015	Badi Door Se Aaye Hai	Guest Appearance	Sab TV	Hindi
2014	Aa Family Comedy Che	Colonel Mr. Abhyankar Jobanputra	Colors Gujarati	Gujarati
2012	Byaah Hamari Bahoo Ka	Praveen Kumar - Son - in law of Vaishnav Family	Sony Entertainment Television	Hindi
2007-08	Shraddha	-	Zee TV Gujarati	Gujarati
1993	VIRASAT		DD 2	-
2003	Hum Paanch	-	Zee TV	Hindi
2003-05	So Da’da Sasuna	-	ETV Gujarati (29th RAPA AWARD)	Gujarati
2000-01	Captain House	-	-	-
2000	Krishna - Arjun	-	Star Plus	Hindi
2005	Sensex	-	ETV Gujarati	Gujarati
2003	Pati Patni Ane Vavajodu	-	ETV Gujarati	Gujarati
1996	Zameen Se Asmaan Tak	-	DD2	-
1998	Raja Aur Rancho	-	-	-
1995	Commander	-	Zee TV	Hindi

== Filmography ==
Movie	Character	Language
Dharti Parna Khel	-	Gujarati

== Awards and achievements ==
Year	Category	Award
2006	Best Actor	6th Annual Gujarati Screen & Stage Award
2008	Best Actor	8th annual Programme of Brhamashatriya Samaj
