= Rajesh Soni =

Indian artist (born 1981)

- Born: Rajesh Soni; 6 August 1981; Udaipur, India
- Known for: Painter
- Website: http://www.rajesh-soni.com

Rajesh Soni (6 August 1981) is an artist living in Udaipur, Rajasthan, who has become known primarily for his abilities to hand paint digital photographs. He is the son of artist Lalit Soni, and the grandson of Prabhu Lal Soni, who was once court photographer to the Maharana Sir Bhopal Singh of Mewar. Prabhu Lal Soni (also known as Prabhu Lal Verma) was not only a court photographer, but also a hand-colorist who painted the black-and-white photographs that he produced. The skills of hand-coloring photographs were passed down to Rajesh through the intermediary of his father Lalit.

Rajesh Soni's talents for sketching and drawing were noticed at an early age and fostered by his father. As a young boy, Rajesh sketched from life the historic havelis and architecture of Udaipur's old city, sometimes looking over the shoulders of art students who gathered to sketch on the ghats, and also eagerly teaching himself English from visiting tourists. In 2007 Rajesh met the American photographer Waswo X. Waswo, who encouraged him to work on reviving the tradition of hand-colored photography. Working on Waswo's digital prints, Soni blended his grandfather's traditional craft with the new technologies of photographic printing. This collaborative effort between Soni and Waswo, combined with a series of collaborative miniatures Waswo had done in conjunction with the painter Rakesh Vijay, was eventually to become an exhibition that toured India under the name A Studio in Rajasthan. Since the success of these exhibitions Soni has travelled to Italy, Switzerland, and beyond.

A portion of these photographic collaborations between Rajesh Soni and Waswo X. Waswo was released as the book Men of Rajasthan, published by Serindia Contemporary in 2011.
