= Meera Dewan =

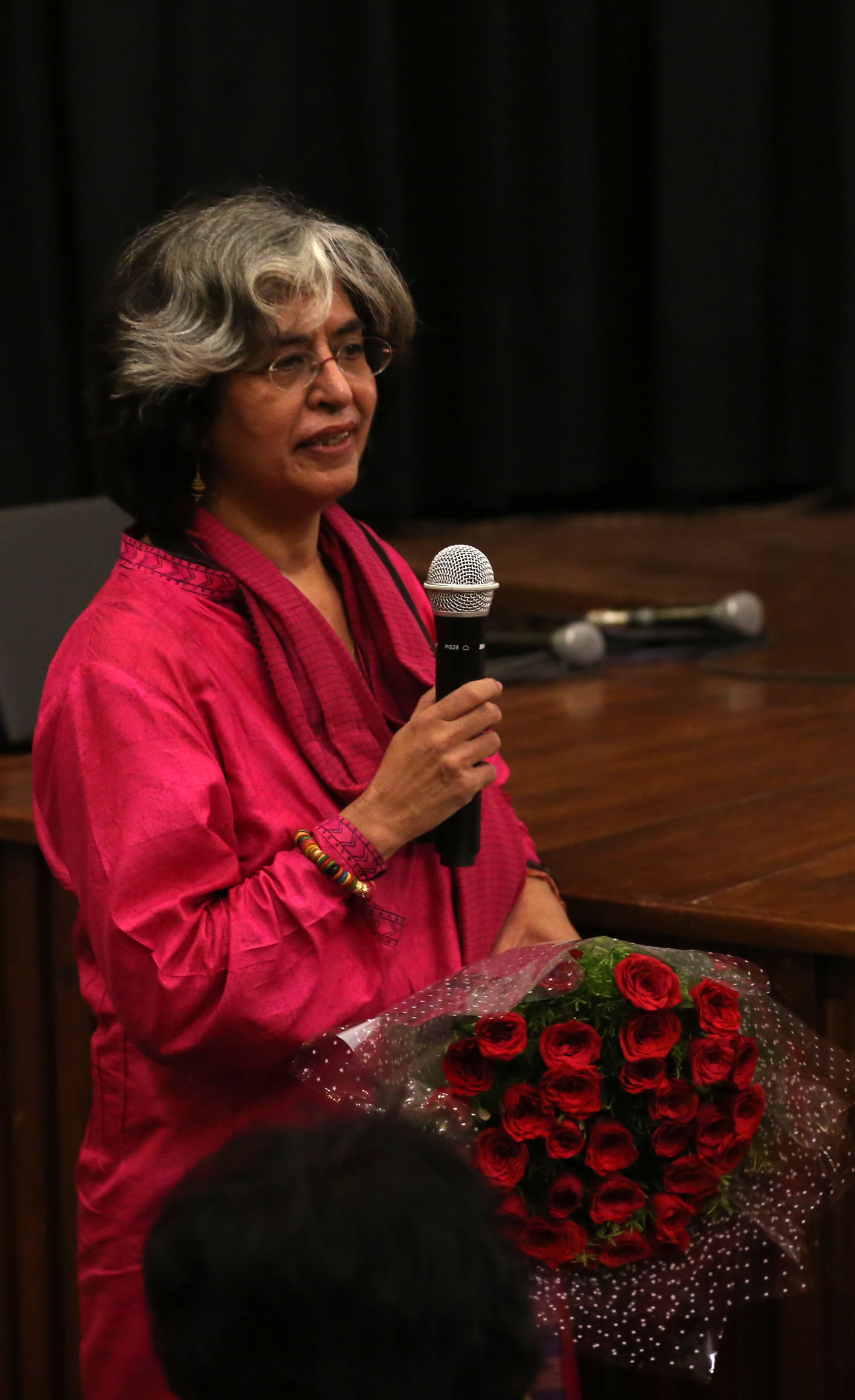
- Citizenship: India
- Occupations: Filmmaker, Columnist

Meera Dewan is a social-issue documentary filmmaker and columnist based out of New Delhi, India. Since 1983, Meera has directed award winning documentaries on alternate visions for society, including equality for women, children, indigenous people, and on the themes around the protection of our shared planet. She has filmed extensively in India, S Asia, Vietnam, Germany, Canada. Her films have won over 21 international and national awards including at International Film Festival of India; Festival de films du femmes, France; Oberhausen Film Festival (4 Awards); Leipzig Film Festival, Reina Film Festival, France; Okomedia Film Fest, (Grand Jury Award), Mumbai International Film Fest, National Film Festival, India.

== Career ==
Her first documentary, "Gift of Love", was an anti-dowry film for Films Division of India. Since then she has filmed documentaries in South Asia, Vietnam, Germany and Canada. Her films have won over 21 international and national awards, including at the Reina Film Festival, Okomedia Film Festival, International Film Festival of India, Festival de films du femmes, Oberhausen Film Festival, Leipzig Film Festival and the Mumbai International Film Festival. She has been on the juries of the Leipzig, Okomedia, Oberhausen, Freiberg, Indian Panorama and National Film Festivals.

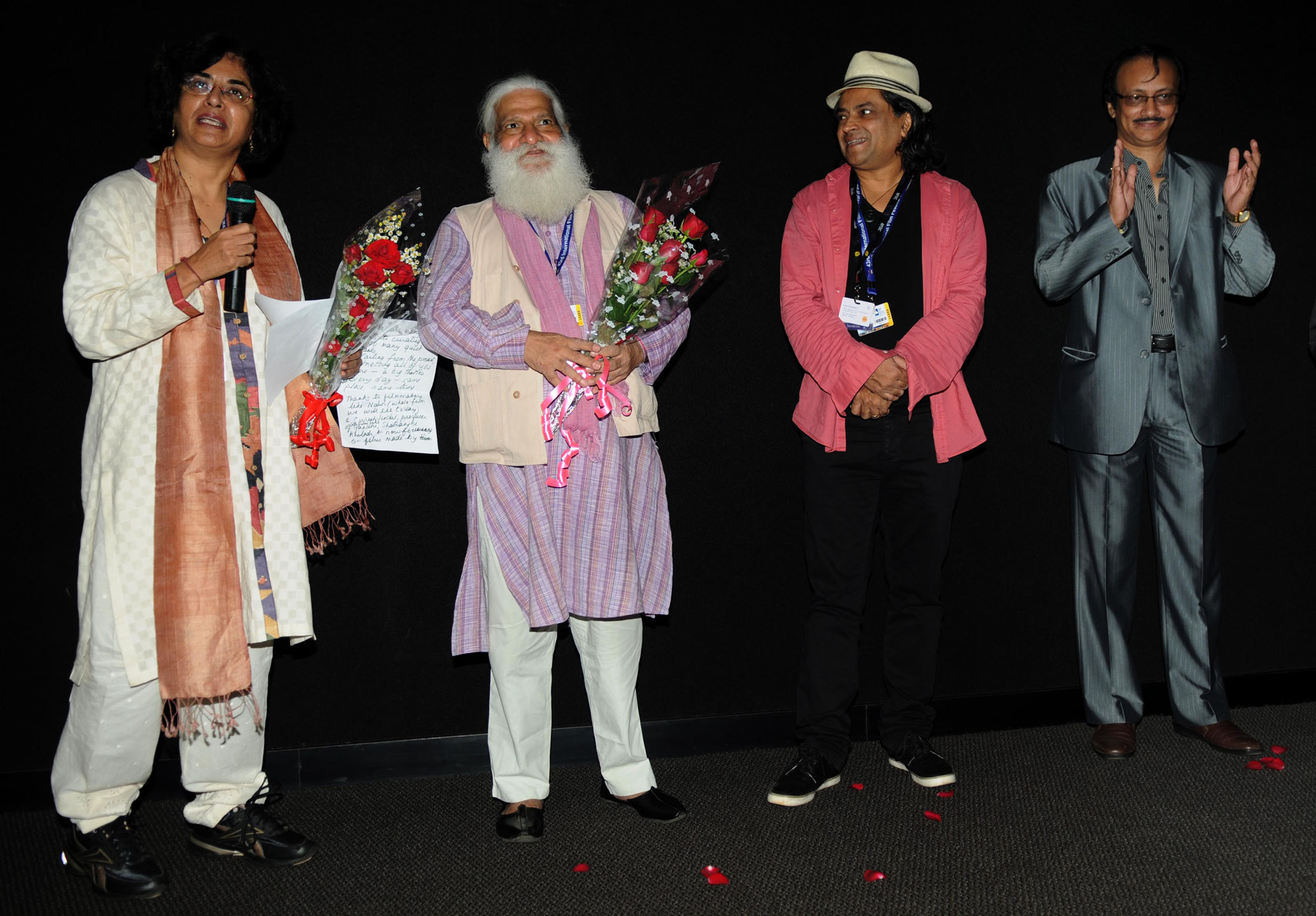
Dewan (left) at IFFI 2012

She has produced and directed over 70 documentary films. Her latest films include "In his Inner Voice: Kuldip Nayar", a biography of South Asia’s beloved chronicler journalist Kuldip Nayar (link below) for Films Division, Ministry of Information and Broadcasting. The film features Gulzar, Arpana Caur, Noor Zaheer, Deepmala Mohan and other artists.

Her documentary for the Films Division of the Ministry of Information and Broadcasting, Government of India, on the 12th Century mystic poet, Baba Farid, "Baba Farid: Poet of the Soul" was released in 2019.

Another documentary premiered in 2017 made by Meera Dewan for PSBT is "DHUN MEIN DHYAN: Meditations in Music in the Guru Granth Sahib" underlining the multi-faith aspects of the Guru Granth Sahib. The film has shabads or verses sung by renowned Sufi singer Hans Raj Hans, 13th generation Keertaniya Bhai Kultar Singh, thumri singer Vidya Rao and paintings by internationally known artist Arpana Caur.

Her ongoing work includes a series of films in Punjab, including the widely screened film on the langar tradition of food sharing, "Gur Prasad: The Grace of Food".

Meera curates films. As a guest curator for International Film Festival of India, IFFI, Goa, she conceptualized and curated SOUL OF ASIA, a popular film section that explores diverse aspects of Faith, in theory and practice. The films raise ethical and existential — and sometimes political — questions.

She guest-curated a retrospective of the films of writer Ruth Prawer Jhabvala titled "Three Continents" to celebrate the work and life of the writer.

Meera is passionate about working on issues relating to eliminating hunger for which she has launched media campaigns, including for Oxfam.

Meera is also a columnist and has written on a wide range of topics, ranging from spirituality to social issues. She has written in the Outlook (Indian magazine) and The Indian Express. She has written on open prison systems and the archaic justice delivery system, and how climate is a refugee in the story of nature and man in poetry.

Occasionally, Meera writes for national newspapers, one of the article being: ′The divine principles of sharing resources, hunger, justice in immigration.
