= Waswo X. Waswo =

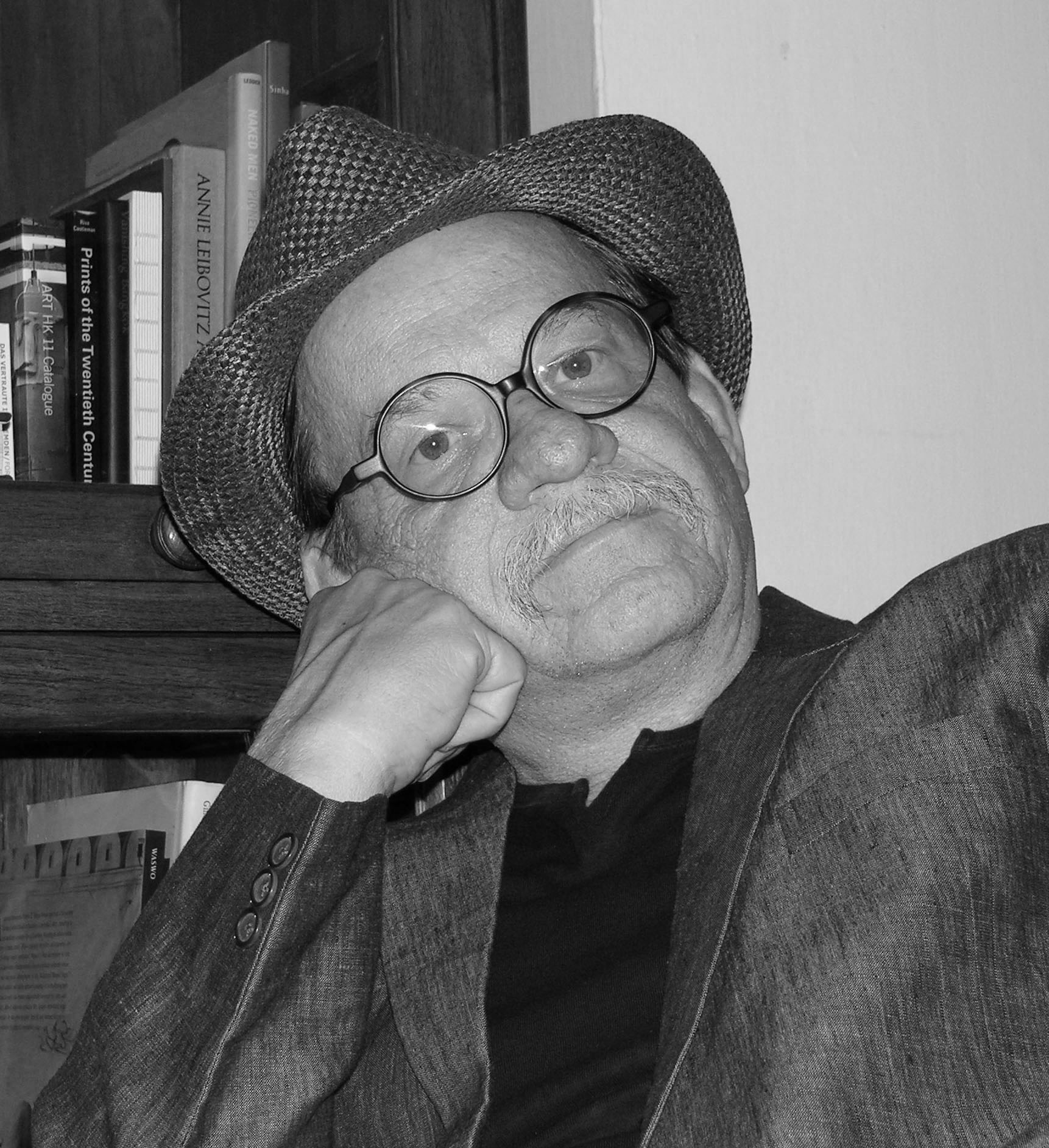
- Born: Richard John Waswo; November 13, 1953; Milwaukee, Wisconsin, USA
- Known for: art, photography

Waswo X. Waswo (November 13, 1953), is a photographer and artist formerly most commonly associated with his chemical process sepia-toned photographs of India, but more recently with hand-colored portraits made at his studio in Udaipur, Rajasthan. Waswo’s first major book, India Poems: The Photographs, was in part a challenge to politically correct notions of the western artist's role in responding to Asia, and his work has been critiqued in the light of cultural theories that stem from Edward Said and his book Orientalism. He has also produced a large body of self-referential paintings in collaboration with traditionally trained Rajasthani miniaturists R. Vijay, Chirag & Shankar Kumawat, and Dalpat Jingar

== Biography ==
Waswo was born in Milwaukee, Wisconsin, U.S.A. He studied at the University of Wisconsin – Milwaukee, and later at Studio Marangoni, the Centre for Contemporary Photography in Florence, Italy. After extensive worldwide travels he settled in India in 2001.

== India Poems ==
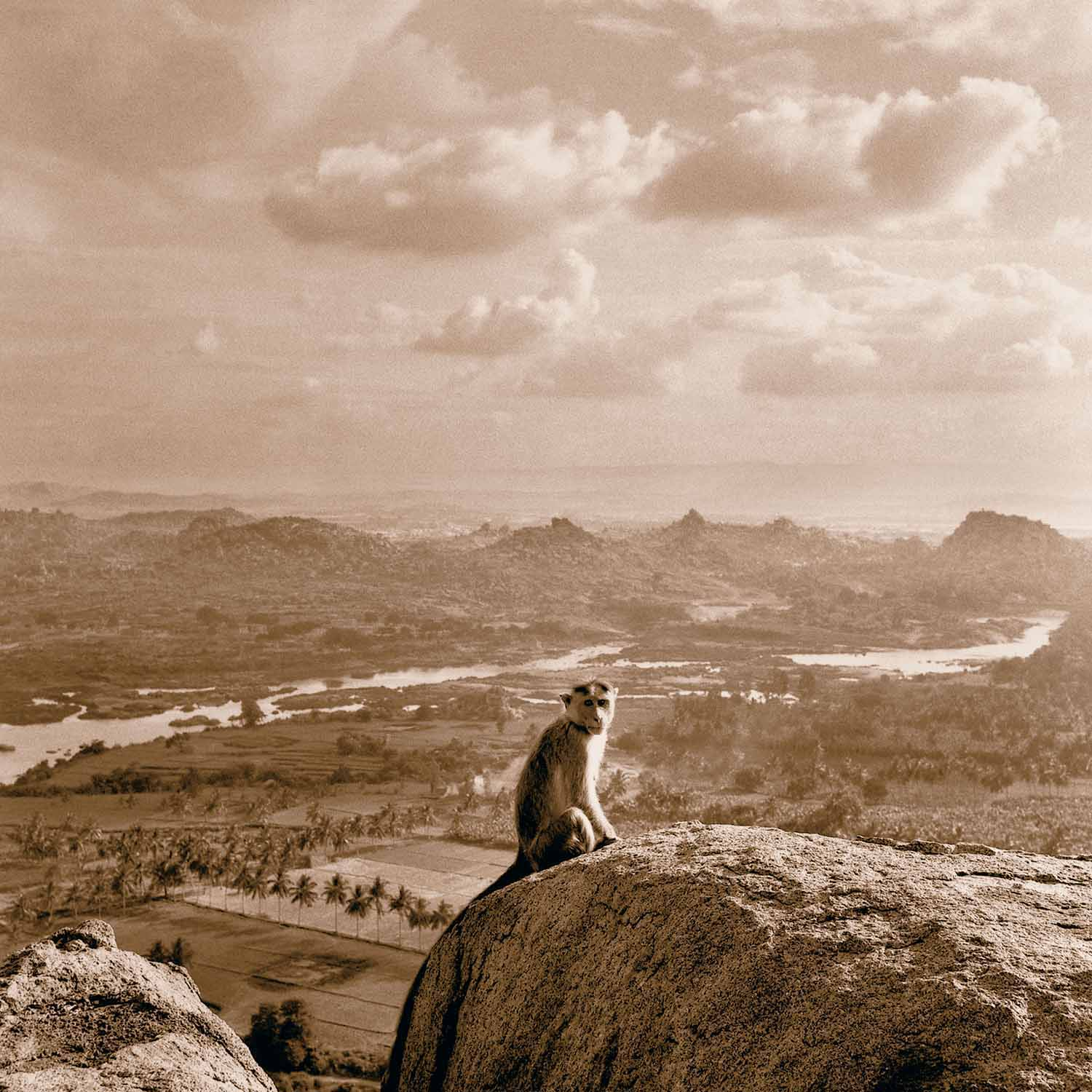
India poems

Waswo's photographs of Indian landscapes and people were showcased in the traveling exhibition titled 'India Poems' organised with the support of Alliance Française, Kashi Art Gallery, and Cymroza Art Gallery. The exhibition traveled to Cochin, Bangalore, Bombay, Udaipur and Goa, and also was exhibited in Colombo and Kandy in Sri Lanka. "India Poems" culminated in a show at The Haggerty Museum of Art in Waswo's hometown of Milwaukee. Waswo's India Poems exhibitions and book were widely written about in India. An article by Curtis Carter eventually appeared in The International Yearbook of Aesthetics titled "Invented Worlds: India Through the Camera Lens of Waswo X. Waswo".

== Studio in Rajasthan ==
Since India Poems Waswo has created a series of studio portraits at his home in Udaipur, Rajasthan, following the tradition of Indian studio portraitists such as those done by Lala Deen Dayal. Waswo has collaborated with Rajesh Soni, a local craftsman who hand-paints Waswo's digital prints. Some of these portraits have been published as the book Men of Rajasthan by Serindia Contemporary in Chicago. Waswo also has collaborated with the miniaturist painter Rakesh Vijay to create an autobiographical picture-story of his life in India and the accompanying emotions of both alienation and the sense of western privilege. Waswo’s collaborations with Rajesh Soni, Dalpat Jingar, R. Vijay, and Chirag and Shankar Kumawat are collectively titled "A Studio in Rajasthan" and have been written about by London-based art critic Edward Lucie-Smith, Christopher Pinney, Kavita Singh and more.

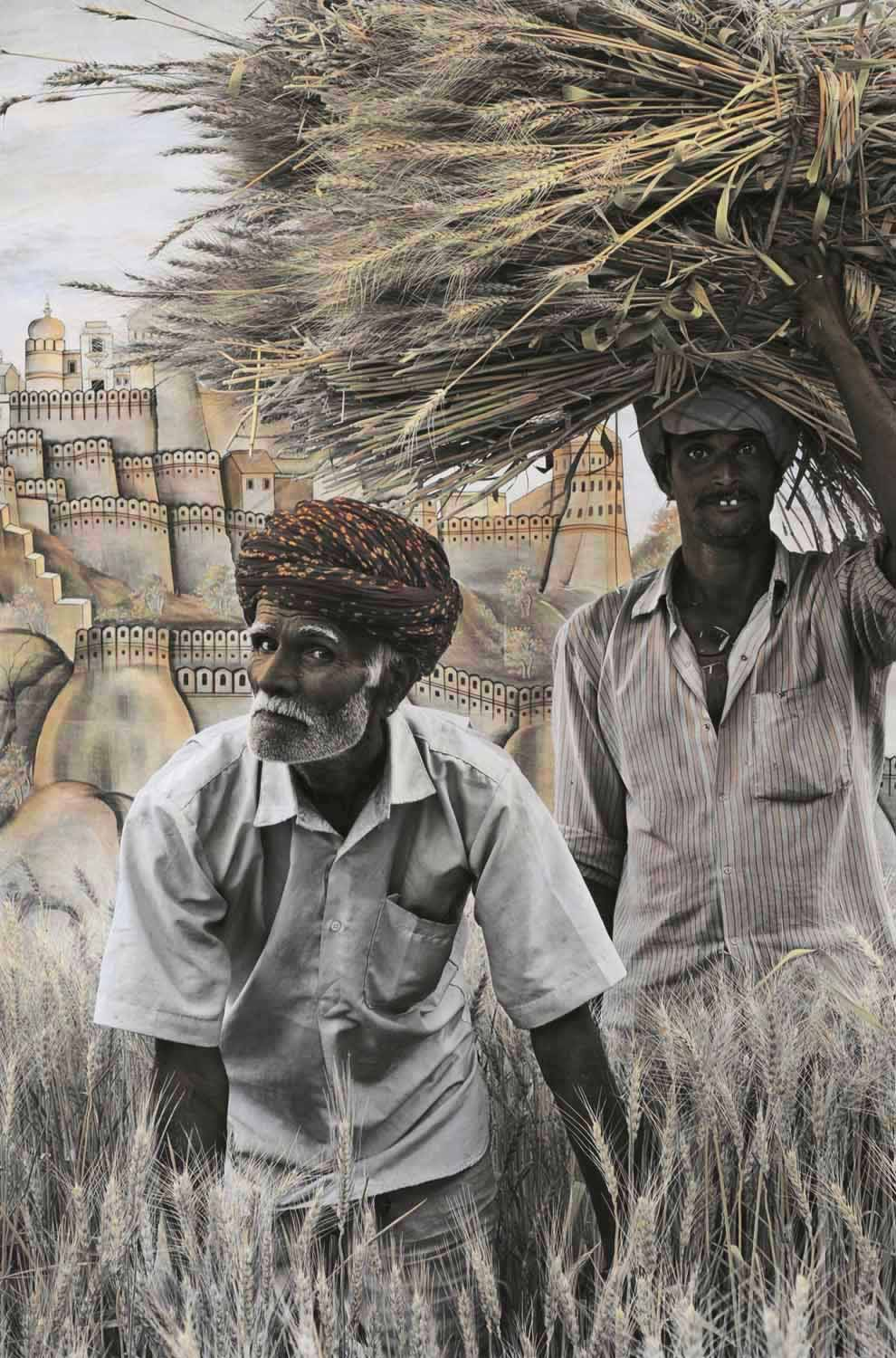
April Harvest

From 2007 Waswo has concentrated almost exclusively on the "Studio in Rajasthan" series of hand-coloured portraits. This has resulted in several exhibitions in India and abroad, most notably "Tinted by Tradition", a retrospective of this work held at the Bhagwat Prakash Photo Gallery at Udaipur's City Palace Museum. Tinted by Tradition also traced the continuum of hand-painted photographs in the Mewar court, including examples of hand-painted photographs by Rajesh Soni's grandfather Prabhu Lal Verma (Soni). Waswo has continued collaborating in the making of symbolic and autobiographical miniatures with his miniature team. Waswo sees these miniatures as a distinct but parallel body of work.

The miniatures themselves have been the subject of two books: The Artful Life of R. Vijay (Annapurna Garimella, Serindia Publishers, Chicago), and Karkhana: A Studio in Rajasthan (Mapin Publishers, India)

Waswo's team mounted an exhibit titled "Confessions of an Evil Orientalist" in December 2011 at Gallery Espace in New Delhi. Incorporating more experimental media such as installation, a video, and even a comic book, the exhibition extended their normal repertoire of hand-coloured photographs and miniatures. Confessions of an Evil Orientalist revolved around a list of 101 confessions, written by Waswo in both a sincere and tongue-in-cheek manner, which alluded once again to issues of hegemony, Orientalism, and cultural acceptance. These confessions found expression within three text-based works of art in the exhibition, each viewing the words of the constructed "Evil Orientalist" from a different perspective. It has been suggested that these works moved from a post-colonial discourse to a post-post-colonial discourse.

== Acclaims and criticisms ==
Waswo's sepia work has been compared to early 20th-century photographers such as Edward Curtis, but his inclusion of self-portraiture draws analogies to postmodernists such as Cindy Sherman, who works in series, typically photographing herself in a range of costumes. This is particularly evident in the artist’s newer work, such as the series “A Visitor to the Court” which relies upon parodic self-portraiture.

Waswo's work has encouraged debate on the ethical questions of photography, especially the question of a westerner's role in photographing a foreign land. Bangalore-based artist Pushpamala N. in an article titled "Photographing the Natives" criticizes that Waswo follows the long tradition of hegemonic and largely negative western depictions of the East. She quotes, "The "truths" that Waswo seeks to reveal are not so personal or hidden. In fact they belong to a long history of representing the subcontinent that go back a hundred and fifty years. If one history of seeing India was to see it as an underdeveloped, decadent and inferior subject civilization, another was to posit the inherent "spiritualism" of the East against the crass materialism of the West. In constructing his archetypal "Other", Waswo is unable to escape from an inherited way of seeing the Indian landscape and its people".

Indian writer and cultural theorist Ranjit Hoskote has defended Waswo against Pushpamala's criticism. He says that artists like Waswo, when they step into the Indian situation – choosing to live and work in India and taking Indian subjects as the focus of their work – are either idolised or stigmatised: there is no middle ground of response for them to occupy. He further argues that, "Ideologically, Waswo's art is often obliged to justify itself to those who view it as no more than a contemporary projection of classical Orientalism; formally, it is not infrequently forced to explain its affinities with the lineage of pictorialism. To viewers habituated to the fast-forward of artistic strategies that deploy the newest media, also, Waswo may have to defend his retrieval of a 19th-century approach in the 21st century, while declining to be giddily playful or coolly subversive in the postmodernist fashion approved by the practitioners of retro chic. But Waswo's photographic images ought to be viewed in a spirit that can transcend such entrenched, guilt-based binaries of affront and critique, offence and defensiveness. These images are subtle, classical, mannered in the best sense. At the same time, they are unquestionably the testimony of a gaze that is empathetic, for Waswo's observations are made from the viewpoint of a transitive, relational self that releases itself to its subjects, rather than suffocating them in a colonialist authorial embrace."

== Art collector ==
In India Waswo is also known as a collector of fine art prints. He has regularly blogged his "Collection of Indian Printmaking", which contains historical and contemporary examples of Indian etchings, lithographs, woodcuts and screen prints. In the fall of 2011 Waswo was guest editor of a trilogy on Indian printmaking put out by the Calcutta-based art magazine Art Etc. news&views, however, in 2016 Waswo gifted his entire collection of more than two-hundred Indian prints to the University of Iowa Stanley Museum of Art. He has also collected vintage Indian miniatures, the bulk of which he has donated to the Museum of Art and Photography (MAP), Bangalore.

== Bibliography ==
Karkhana: A Studio in Rajasthan, Mapin, 2022

Gauri Dancers, Mapin, 2019

Photowallah, Tasveer, preface by Christopher Pinney, 2016 (hardcover)

The Artful Life of R. Vijay, (a book about our collaborations) written by Annapurna Garimella with a preface by Kavita Singh, Serindia Contemporary, 2015 (hardcover)

Men of Rajasthan, Serindia Contemporary, 2011 (paperback), 2014 (hardcover)

A Three Megapixel Journal, Lulu, 2007

India Poems: The Photographs, Gallerie Publishers, 2006

India Poems, Seventy-five Poems by The American Photographer, Rooftop Vistas, 2004

Waswo X. Waswo in Anthologies:

Third Eye Photography: and Ways of Seeing, edited by Alka Pande, Speaking Tiger, 2019

Lessons from Hell, Printing and Punishment in India, Christopher Pinney, Marg, 2018

Photography in India: From Archives to Contemporary Practice, edited by Aileen Blaney and Chinar Shah, Bloomsbury Academic, 2018

Pages of a Mind: Raja Ravi Varma Life And Expressions, Vaishnavi Ramanathan, Piramal Art Foundation, 2016

Positions, Asia Critique, Vol 24:2, edited by Tani Barlow, Duke University Press, 2016

Feeling Photography, edited by Elspeth H. Brown and Thy Phu, Duke University Press, 2014

Mein Schwules Auge #11, Rinaldo Hopf and Axel Schock, Konkursbuch Berlin, 2014

Positions, Asia Critique, Vol 20:1, edited by Tani Barlow, Duke University Press, 2012

Mein Schwules Auge #7, Rinaldo Hopf and Axel Schock, Konkursbuch Berlin, 2010

Leela, An Erotic Play of Verse and Art, Alka Pande, Harper-Collins India, 2009

Mein Schwules Auge #6, Rinaldo Hopf and Axel Schock, Konkursbuch Berlin, 2009
