= Chick lit =

Term for a type of popular young women's fiction

"Chick lit" is a term used to describe a type of popular fiction targeted at women. Widely used in the 1990s and 2000s, the term has fallen out of fashion with publishers, with numerous writers and critics rejecting it as inherently sexist. Novels identified as chick lit typically address romantic relationships, female friendships, and workplace struggles in humorous and lighthearted ways. Typical protagonists are urban, heterosexual women in their late twenties and early thirties: the 1990s chick lit heroine represented an evolution of the traditional romantic heroine in her assertiveness, financial independence and enthusiasm for conspicuous consumption.

The format developed through the early 1990s in both the United States and the United Kingdom with books such as Terry McMillan's Waiting to Exhale (1992, US) and Catherine Alliott's The Old Girl Network (1994, UK). Helen Fielding's Bridget Jones's Diary (1996, UK), wildly popular globally, is the seminal text of chick lit, while Candace Bushnell's (US) 1997 novel Sex and the City, adapted to a well-known television program, has huge ongoing cultural influence.

By the late 1990s, chick lit titles regularly topped bestseller lists, and many imprints were created devoted entirely to it. By the mid-2000s, commentators noted that its market was increasingly saturated, and by the early 2010s, publishers had largely abandoned the category. Nonetheless, the term "chick lit" persists as a popular category of fiction for both readers and amateur writers on the internet.

While the concept of "chick lit" has become outdated in developed-world English language literature, the term, and regional derivations of it, continue to be widely used to describe and analyse popular women's literature in other languages and other parts of the world.

== Origins and derivations of the term ==
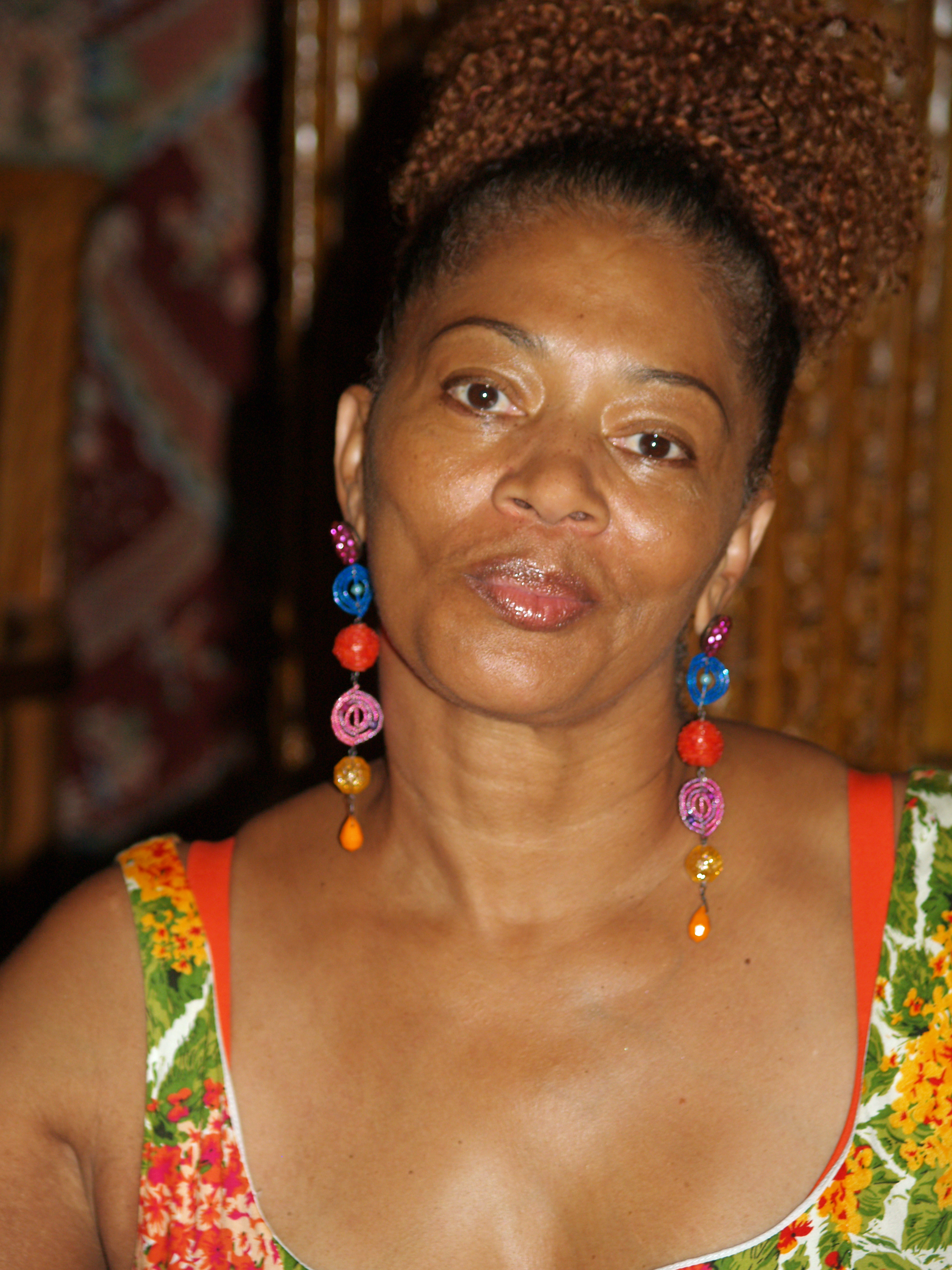
Author Terry McMillan, in 2008. McMillan's 1992 novel Waiting to Exhale predated the chick-lit label but, in its focus on the lives of a group of 30-something single women professionals, has been identified as a key precursor of the category

In 1992, Los Angeles Times critic Carolyn See was probably the first to spot that a new style of popular women's fiction was emerging. Though she didn't use the term chick lit, in a review of Terry McMillan's Waiting to Exhale, the critic noted that McMillan's book was not "lofty" or "luminous" but was likely to be highly commercially successful. Carolyn See wrote, "McMillan's new work is part of another genre entirely, so new it doesn't really have a name yet. This genre has to do with women, triumph, revenge, comradeship."

Chick lit did not become an established term for a style of novel until the second half of the 1990s. "Chick" is American slang for a young woman, and "lit" is a shortened form of the word "literature." There was probably no single origin of the term: Princeton University students were reported in 1988 to use chick lit as slang for a course on the Female Literary Tradition and, in the UK, Oxford Reference report that the term arose as a "flippant counterpart" to the term "lad lit". The parallel term used for movies, chick flick, enjoyed slightly earlier uptake. In what was probably one of its first major outings, the term chick lit was deployed ironically: Chick Lit: Postfeminist Fiction was a 1995 anthology of 22 short stories written in response to editors Cris Mazza's and Jeffrey DeShell's call for "postfeminist writing." Early use of the term was heavily associated with journalism (both Bridget Jones's Diary and Sex in the City began as newspaper columns) and James Wolcott's 1996 article in The New Yorker, "Hear Me Purr," co-opted the term chick lit to proscribe what he called the trend of "girlishness" evident in the writing of female newspaper columnists at that time.

In the early years, there was some variation on the exact term used: in 2000, the Sydney Morning Herald reported the birth of a "publishing phenomenon" that can be called "chick fiction."

At the peak of the term's popularity, a slew of related sub-genres were proposed with similar names chick lit jr (for young readers), mommy lit, and chick lit in corsets (historical fiction, and a term only found in one academic paper published in the Journal of Popular Romance Studies). The relationship with the term lad lit is more complicated: lad lit arose in the UK separately from, and possibly before, chick lit. Later, the term lad lit was adopted in the US for a male-oriented subgenre of chick lit (see lad lit). Of these parallel terms, mommy lit, and lad lit are the only terms to have enjoyed any significant uptake - and that a tiny fraction of the use of the primary term chick lit.

Other derivations of the term chick lit have been used to describe varieties of popular women's literature in different regions, or targeted at specific ethnic communities. In the US this has included "Sistah lit" targeted at black readers and "Chica lit" for Latina readers. In India the term "Ladki Lit" has been used (see below). In Turkey, çıtır literature is a category (çıtır literally means 'crispy', but is colloquialy used to refer to attractive young women)

== Writers and critics ==
Controversy over chick lit focused at first on the literary value of books identified or promoted as part of the genre. Over time, controversy has focused more on the term itself, and whether the concept of a chick lit genre is inherently sexist.

In 1998, reviewer Alex Kuczynski, writing for The New York Times, condemned Helen Fielding's Bridget Jones's Diary, writing: "Bridget is such a sorry spectacle, wallowing in her man-crazed helplessness, that her foolishness cannot be excused." In 2001, writer Doris Lessing deemed the genre "instantly forgettable" while Beryl Bainbridge called chick lit "a froth sort of thing". Author Jenny Colgan immediately fired back at Lessing and Bainbridge, explaining why, for a new generation of women, chick lit was an important development:

We really are the first generation who have grown up with education as a right; with financial independence; with living on our own and having far too many choices about getting married (while watching our baby boomer parents fall apart), having children (while watching our elder sisters run themselves ragged trying to do everything), and hauling ourselves up through the glass ceiling.

Who reflects this? Growing up in the 1980s all we had to read if we wanted commercial fiction, were thick, shiny, brick novels covered in gold foil, in which women with long blonde hair built up business empires from harsh beginnings using only their extraordinary beauty and occasionally some goldfish...

With BJD, for the first time, here we were. The first time I read it, it was an absolute revelation to see my life and confusion reflected in print.

— Jenny Colgan, 2001

Two years later Colgan had turned strongly against the term chick lit, being the first to state what is now a mainstream position among writers of women's popular fiction: she rejected the term chick lit while defending the cultural value of her work. She observed, "Chick-lit is a deliberately condescending term they use to rubbish us all. If they called it slut-lit it couldn't be any more insulting." Much of the debate at this time was between different generations of women writers: for example, Maureen Dowd (b.1952) described the younger women's work as "all chick and no lit," while Colgan (b.1972) derided the older, female critics of chick lit as "hairy-leggers." There was a "troubling" lack of solidarity.

In 2005, debate continued with the publication of editor Elizabeth Merrick's anthology of women's fiction, This Is Not Chick Lit (2005), where Merrick argued in her introduction that "Chick lit's formula numbs our senses." In response, self-identifying chick-lit author Lauren Baratz-Logsted published her own anthology of stories This Is Chick Lit whose project was "born out of anger" and aimed to prove that chick lit was not all "Manolos and cosmos, and cookie-cutter books about women juggling relationships and careers in the new millennium," but rather that the genre deals with "friendship and laughter, love and death - i.e. the stuff of life."

In 2007, Diane Shipley came to the genre's defence, arguing that chick lit books increasingly covered serious topics but, anyway, "I just don't see what's morally or intellectually wrong with reading a book you enjoy and relate to, that might not draw deep conclusions about the future of humanity but might cheer you up after a bad day, or see you through your own health problems."

However, through the late 2000s and 2010s, writers increasingly distanced themselves from the term, while arguing that blanket critical dismissals of their work were rooted in sexism. For example, in a 2010 Guardian article, humor writer DJ Connell leads with changing her writing name from Diane to DJ to avoid the chick lit label. Sophie Kinsella and Marian Keyes, two authors who have enjoyed huge success through and beyond the chick lit era, both now reject the term. Kinsella refers to her own work as "romantic comedy". Keyes said of the term in 2014,

It's meant to be belittling. It's as if it's saying, "Oh you silly girls, with your pinkness and shoes, how will you ever run the world?" But as I've matured (haha) I've realised that I'm very proud of what I write about and I know that the books I write bring happiness and comfort to people.

== Publishers ==
In 2000, Sydney Morning Herald described the "publishing phenomenon" of what it called "chicfic," books with "Covers [that] are candy-bright, heavy in pink and fluorescence. The titles are also candy-bright, hinting at easy digestion and a good laugh... ...Such books are positioned in a marketplace as hybrids of the magazine article, fictional or fictionalised, television...and comfort food digestible over a single night at home."

Through the 2000s publishers continued to push the subgenre because sales continued to be high. In 2003, Publishers Weekly reported on numerous new chick lit imprints, such as, "Kensington's Strapless, which launched in April 2003 and has one book a month scheduled through the end of 2004. Kensington editorial director John Scognamiglio explained that the imprint was created in response to requests from salespeople for a chick lit brand." Nonetheless, the same Publishers Weekly article was already looking back enviously at the massive sales achieved by Bridget Jones's Diary in 1998 and commenting on the challenges for chick lit publishers in a now-overcrowded market. Already, Publishers Weekly suggested, chick lit was - if not in decline - at least at a turning point.

In 2008, editor Sara Nelson stated that the definition of what's considered to be within the genre of chick lit has become more accomplished and "grown up".

By 2012 news sources were reporting the death of chick lit. Salon.com reported that "Because chick lit (whatever it is - or was) provoked so many ideologically fraught arguments about the values placed on women's vs. men's tastes, high- vs. lowbrow culture, comedy vs. drama and so on, it's tempting to read particular significance into its decline," but went on to argue that the decline was due to a normal process of changing fashion and taste in genre fiction.

== Chick lit online ==
The development and decline of chick lit as a publishing phenomenon coincided with an explosion in internet usage in the developed world. The academic Sandra Folie argues that "Fans and their websites or blogs, online presences of newspapers, magazines, or publishing houses, and also the free encyclopedia Wikipedia" played a key part in defining and shaping the concept of a chick lit genre. Folie discusses the British site chicklit.co.uk which was online from 2002 to 2014 and included information not just on books and authors but also lifestyle issues for young women. The American Chicklitbooks.com was online from 2003 to 2013 discussing, "Hip, bright literature for today's modern woman." As chick lit declined as a publishing category fans online created their own response: in 2012 a website called chicklitisnotdead.com was reported to have 25,000 users. In 2022 an active chick lit community group on the goodreads.com site had 4,756 members.

== Chick lit globally ==
Though chick lit originated in the UK and U.S., it rapidly became a global publishing phenomenon - and indeed may have been one of the first truly global publishing trends.

=== Saudi Arabia ===
In a book published in 2011, and in an article in Le Monde Diplomatique, academic Madawi Al-Rasheed discussed the emergence of Saudi "chick lit" over the preceding decade. Highlighting books from Saudi women authors including Raja Alsanea (Girls of Riyadh) and Samar al-Muqrin, Al-Rasheed characterises the books - which were first published in the more liberal Lebanon - as "novels that deal with women as active sexual agents.. ..rather than submissive victims of patriarchal society."

"Girls of Riyadh" has been published in English and is still in print in 2023; Publishers Weekly summarises the book as describing, "Four upper-class Saudi Arabian women [who] negotiate the clash between tradition and the encroaching West in this debut novel by 25-year-old Saudi Alsanea. Though timid by American chick lit standards, it was banned in Saudi Arabia for its scandalous portrayal of secular life." The book is widely distributed, being sold in stores from U.S. to Europe. In the reader's guide to novel, Alsanea notes that she wants to enable her Western readers to connect with Saudi culture, seeing that the girls in the novel had the 'same dreams, emotions, and goals' as them.

=== India ===
In India, Rajashree's Trust Me was the biggest-selling Indian chick lit novel. The popularity of novels like Trust Me, Swati Kaushal's Piece of Cake can be seen in the context of the rise of regional varieties of chick lit. In an interview with the New York Times, Helen Fielding said, "I think it had far more to do with zeitgeist than imitation." If the chick lit explosion has "led to great new female writers emerging from Eastern Europe and India, then it's worth any number of feeble bandwagon jumpers." Sunaina Kumar wrote in the Indian Express, "Ten years after the publication of Bridget Jones's Diary, the genre of fiction most recognisable for its pink cover art of stilettos, martini glasses and lipsticks, is now being colourfully infused with bindis, saris, and bangles." Indian chick lit is sometimes referred to as 'ladki-lit'.

=== Brazil ===
In Brazil, chick lit in translation is categorised as "Literatura de mulherzinha." -inha is the Portuguese diminutive form, so this means, literally, "little-women's literature." One Brazilian commentator notes, "The diminutive is not by accident. Just as its not by accident that the covers of books by women writers are usually, stereotypically feminine. With covers that suggest a light and romantic, commercial plot. ... books by female authors arrive to the a reader with a series of biases which ensure that these authors remain on the cultural bottom rung."

== See also ==
- Chick flick
- Feminism
- Fratire
- Joseimuke
- Lad lit
- Women's literature
