= Elizabeth Merrick =

American author (born 1970)

- Born: 1970 (age 55–56)
- Education: Yale University (BA); Cornell University (MFA); San Francisco State University (MA)
- Occupation: Author
- Notable work: Grace Reading Series
- Website: elizabethmerrick.com

Elizabeth Merrick (born 1970) is an American author, best known as the founder and director of the Grace Reading Series and as editor of the Random House anthology This is not chick lit.

Merrick received a BA from Yale University, an MFA from Cornell University, and an MA in Creativity and Art Education from San Francisco State University. She has taught at New York University and Cornell and has received fellowships from the Saltonstall Foundation, the Ragdale Foundation, and VCCA.

Merrick is also responsible for the independent publishing house Demimonde Books, which published Girly, Merrick's first novel, released in December 2005.

She currently lives in New York City, where she works as a writing coach and runs the "Elizabeth's Workshops" writing school.
