= Uttara Baokar =

Indian actress (1944–2023)

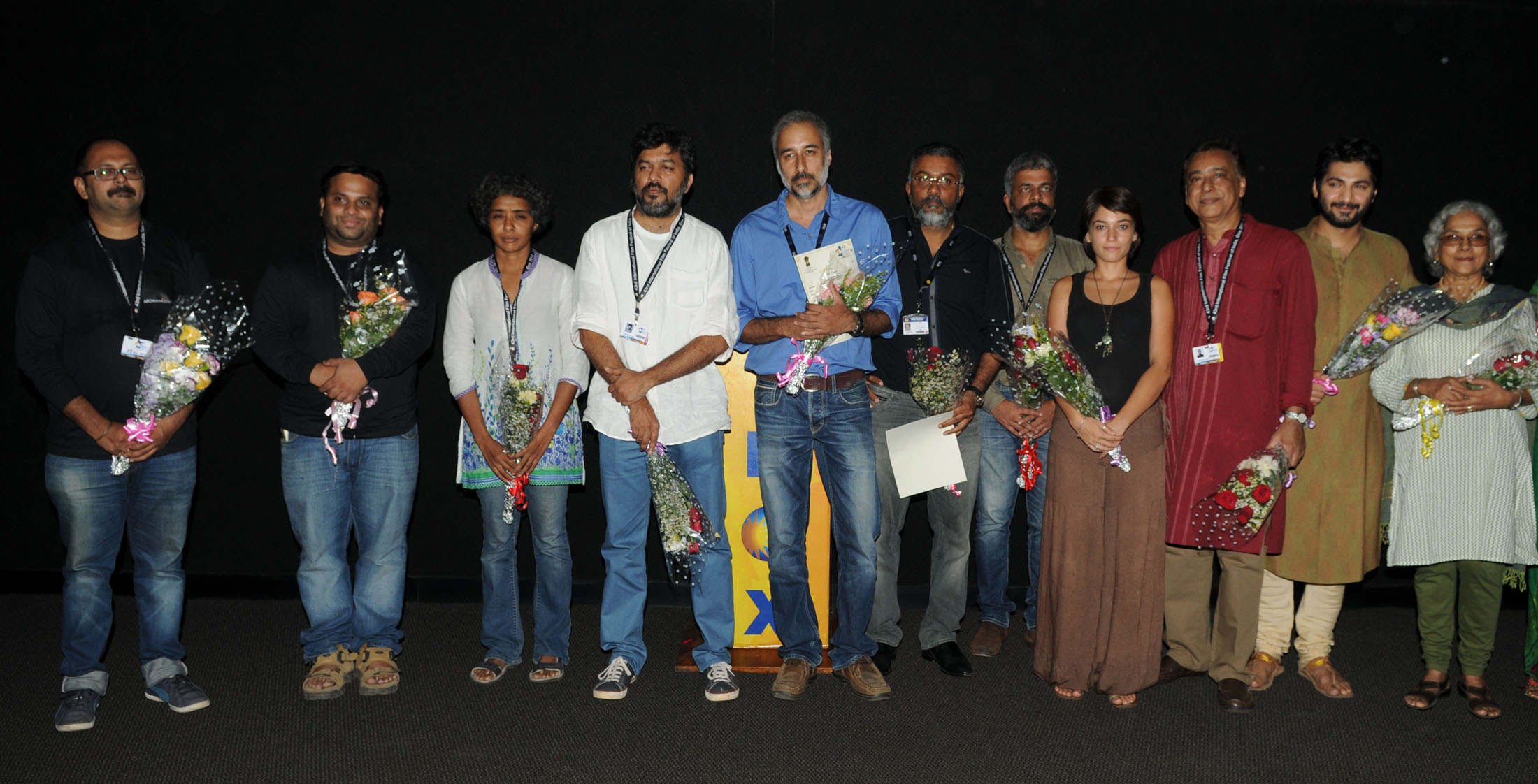
- Baokar (right) at IFFI 2012
- Born: 5 August 1944; Kolhapur, Kolhapur State, British India
- Died: 12 April 2023 (aged 78); Pune, Maharashtra, India
- Occupation: Actress
- Years active: 1968–2023

Uttara Baokar (5 August 1944 – 12 April 2023) was an Indian stage, film, and television actress. She acted in several notable plays, such as Padmavati in Mukyhamantri, Mena in Mena Gurjari, Desdemona in Shakespeare's Othello, the mother in playwright Girish Karnad's Tughlaq, the nautch girl in Chhote Saiyad Bade Saiyad, and the lead role of Umrao in Umrao Jaan. In 1978, she directed Jaywant Dalvi's play Sandhya Chhaya, translated to Hindi by Kusum Kumar.

In 1984, she won the Sangeet Natak Akademi Award for Acting (Hindi theatre). She appeared in Marathi films such as Doghi (1995) with Sadashiv Amrapurkar and Renuka Daftardar, Uttarayan (2005), Shevri (2006), and Restaurant (2006) with Sonali Kulkarni.

== Early life and education ==
Uttara studied acting at National School of Drama (NSD), Delhi, under Ebrahim Alkazi, graduating in 1968.

== Filmography ==
- Yatra (1986)
- Tamas (1987)
- Ek Din Achanak (1989)
- Udaan (TV series) (1990–1991)
- Rukmavati Ki Haveli (1991)
- The Burning Season (1993)
- Doghi (1995) (Marathi)
- Sardari Begum (1996)
- Thakshak (1999)
- Antaral (TV series) (2000)
- Zindagi Zindabad (2000)
- Kora Kaagaz (2002)
- Vaastupurush (2002) (Marathi)
- Nazarana (2002) (TV series)
- Uttarayan (2003) (Marathi)
- Jassi Jaissi Koi Nahin (TV series) (2003–2006)
- Shevri (Marathi Film) (2006)
- Kashmakash Zindagi Ki (TV series) (2006–2009)
- Jabb Love Hua (TV series) (2006–2007)
- Restaurant (2006) (Marathi)
- Rishtey (TV series) (Season 2)
- Sins (2005)
- Hum Ko Deewana Kar Gaye (2006)
- Dor (2006)
- Aaja Nachle (2007)
- 8 x 10 Tasveer (2009)
- Ha Bharat Maza (2011) (Marathi)
- Samhita (2013) (Marathi)
- Ekkees Toppon Ki Salaami (2014) as Politician's mother
- Dev Bhoomi - Land of the Gods (2015) as Priya (Rahul Negi's sister)

== Awards ==
- 1984 Sangeet Natak Akademi Award for Acting (Hindi theatre).
- 1988 National Film Award for Best Supporting Actress for Ek Din Achanak
- 1995 National Film Award – Special Mention (feature film) for Doghi
