= Halo (1996 film) =

- Directed by: Santosh Sivan
- Written by: Santosh Sivan; Sanjay Chhel
- Produced by: Children's Film Society, India
- Starring: Benaf Dadachandji; Rajkumar Santoshi; Viju Khote; Mukesh Rishi; Tinnu Anand
- Cinematography: Santosh Sivan
- Edited by: Kanika Myer Bharat
- Music by: Ranjit Barot
- Release date: 7 February 1996
- Running time: 92 min
- Country: India

Halo is a 1996 Indian Hindi-language drama film directed by Santosh Sivan and produced by Children's Film Society. It stars Benaf Dadachandji, Rajkumar Santoshi, Viju Khote, Mukesh Rishi, and Tinnu Anand in lead roles. The film was released on 7 February 1996.

== Plot ==
The film starts with the school's nun-teacher being frustrated by the ringing of the school bell, which indicates the end of school and the start of summer vacation. The story then turns to Sasha, a motherless child who yearns of a mother's love despite having Mr. Deshpande, her doting father, who works as a criminal lawyer. Her friend Thomas has gone to London to undergo surgery.

During vacation, while all the other kids are busy playing, Sasha sits silently, not eating. So, a servant fabricates a story that a miracle will happen in the form of a halo. A street dog comes along, and Sasha believes it to be the God-sent halo. She adopts it and names it Halo. Sasha's life now revolves around the dog. She sleeps, drinks, and eats with him. Her father doesn't object, even though he doesn't like dogs. Her father, through a Satyavadi and following the principles of Gandhiji, observes a fast. One day, Halo goes missing, and Sasha searches inside and outside for him, but to no avail.

She first asks the police commissioner, who uses her for his own plan to capture a gang of notorious smugglers led by Smuggler Raja. However, the credit for capturing the smugglers goes to Sasha. She also gets help from Ranga (Wasim Khan), a leader of a group of street urchins.

Eventually, she finds Halo under the care of an old couple (Dr. B. M. Banerji and Mrs. Banerji) with their physically disabled grandson Abdul. Sasha happily gives the dog to Abdul.

== Cast ==
- Benaf Dadachandji as Sasha Deshpande
- Bulang Raja as Anil
- Rajkumar Santoshi as Advocate Deshpande, Sasha's father
- Pooja Punjabi as Mamta
- Mukesh Rishi as Police Commissioner
- Tinu Anand as Smuggler Raja
- Harish Patel as Astrologer
- Mehr Vakil as Nun
- Supriya Pathak as Sasha's mother (in photograph)
- Chintu Mahapatra as Chintu
- Dimple Ghosh as Lata
- Poocha as Tiger
- Kavin Dave as Thomas
- Marukh Dadachandji as Thomas's mother
- Sahil Choujar as TV Host of BadBad talk show
- Anamika Ghosh as Videographer
- Dipankar De as Prabhu Deva
- Ashok Narayan as Mr. Pappu, the 99-year-old man
- Halo (dog) as Halo
- Anil Sharma as Smuggler 1
- Javed Khan as Washer Boy

== Awards ==
- 1996: National Film Award for Best Children's Film
- 1996: National Film Award – Special Jury Award / Special Mention (Feature Film) – Benaf Dadachandji
- 2001: Filmfare Award for Best Film (Critics)
