= Anjali Marathe =

Indian playback singer

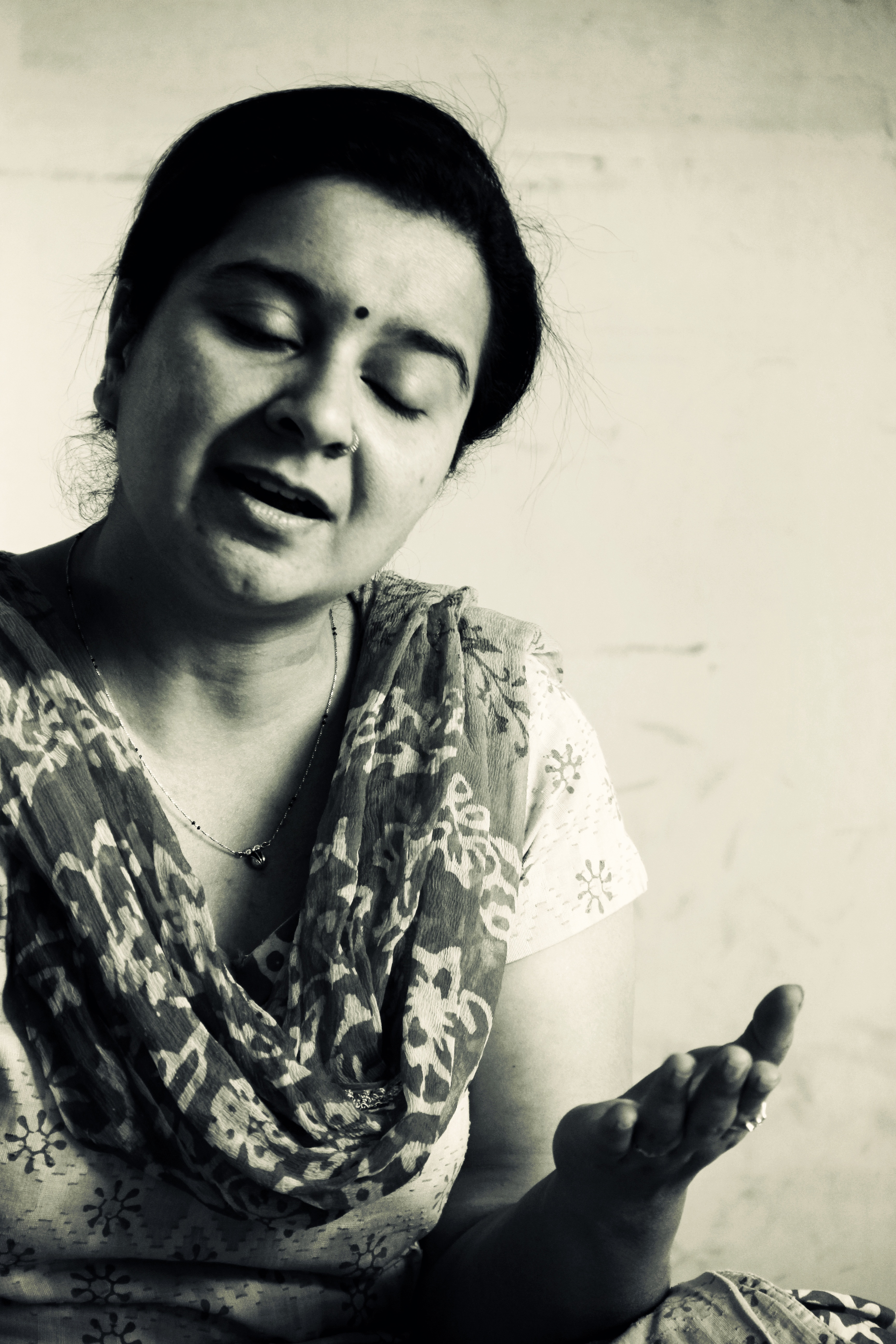

Background information
- Origin: Pune, Maharashtra, India
- Genres: Marathi Geete, Hindi Geete
- Occupations: Playback Singer

Anjali Marathe is an Indian playback singer and Hindustani vocalist. In 1995, she was awarded the National Film Award for Best Female Playback Singer for the song "Bhui Bhegalali Khol" from the Marathi film Doghi. She has also received Maharashtra State Film Award for Best Female Playback Singer for the same.

== Career ==
She is a psychology graduate, initially aspired to pursue medicine but discovered her passion for music during her 11th grade.

She debuted as a playback singer with the song "He Jeevan Sundar Aahe" in the Marathi film Chaukat Raja (1991), composed by Anand Modak and written by Sudhir Moghe, alongside Asha Bhosle and Ravindra Sathe. In 1996, at the age of 16, Anjali won the National Film Award for Best Female Playback Singer for her soulful renditions in the Marathi film Doghi. The citation from the Government of India praised her "melodious and heart-touching expression of the harshness of life." Directed by Sumitra Bhave–Sunil Sukthankar, the film starred Renuka Daftardar and Sonali Kulkarni in lead roles. Anjali sang two iconic songs in the film, "Nagpanchamicha San Bai" and "Bhui Bhegalali Khol," with lyrics by Namdeo Dhondo Mahanor and music by Anand Modak. She also received the Maharashtra State Film Award for her performance.

Anjali lent her voice to songs in Marathi films like Saibaba and Marmabandh. Her rendition of "Umbarachya Banakhali" in Marmabandh earned her a nomination for the Zee Chitra Gaurav Award for Best Female Playback Singer. She also recorded "Jeevan Tyanna Kalale Ho" with her mother Anuradha and singer Ravindra Sathe, written by Balkrishna Bhagwant Borkar and composed by Saleel Kulkarni.

Anjali's talents extended beyond films, as she recorded title tracks for TV serials like Jhoothe Sachhe Gudde Bacche (Hindi) and Olakh Sanga Na (Marathi). She also contributed to children's programs such as Balodyan on All India Radio, Pune.

Anjali has participated in numerous stage shows, including Smrutyayatra at the World Marathi Conference in Mumbai, Safarnama in Nagpur (2019), and Shukratara in Pune (2023). In addition to her singing career, she has actively participated in public speaking, dance, drama, and street plays. She was invited as a guest performer in Jashn-e-Sukhan 2025.

== Discography ==
Year	Film	Song	Composer	Co-artist
1991	Chaukat Raja	"He Jeevan Sundar Aahe"	Anand Modak	Asha Bhosle, Ravindra Sathe
1993	Sai Baba	"Tel Naahi Tup Naahi"	Ram Kadam	Ram Kadam
1995	Doghi	"Bhui Bhegalali Khol"	Anand Modak	Solo
1995	Doghi	"Nag Panchamicha San"	Anand Modak	Shilpa Datar
2002	Dahavi Fa	"Khushi Chehryavar Majhya Ka Nahi Yenar"	Shrirang Umrani	Anuradha Marathe
2003	Vitthal Vitthal	"Yel Majha Gaon"	Saleel Kulkarni	Solo
2003	Vitthal Vitthal	"Hi Vaat Kashi"	Saleel Kulkarni	Solo
2004	Majhe Mann Tujhe Jhale	"Preetivachun Jagen"	Sudhir Moghe	Solo
2008	Marmabandh	"Umbarachya Banakhali"	Achyut Thakur	Solo
2012	Chintoo	"Ekti Ekti"	Saleel Kulkarni	Shubhankar Kulkarni
2015	Bioscope	"Udaseet Ya"	Saleel Kulkarni	Saleel Kulkarni
