= List of songs recorded by Kailash Kher =

This is a list of songs recorded by Indian playback singer Kailash Kher.

== Film songs ==
=== Hindi ===
Year	Film	Song	Composer	Writer(s)	Co-artist(s)	Note
2003	Andaaz	"Rabba Ishq Na Hoye"	Nadeem–Shravan	Sameer Anjaan	Sonu Nigam, Alka Yagnik, Sapna Mukherjee	
2003	Waisa Bhi Hota Hai Part II	"Allah Ke Bande"	Vishal-Shekhar	Vishal Dadlani		
2004	Ab Tumhare Hawale Watan Sathiyo	"Ab Tumhare Hawale Watan Sathiyo"	Anu Malik	Sameer Anjaan	Udit Narayan, Alka Yagnik, Sonu Nigam	
2004	Ab Tumhare Hawale Watan Sathiyo	"Kurti Malmal Di"	Anu Malik	Sameer Anjaan	Anuradha Paudwal, Sneha Pant, Sonu Nigam, Sudesh Bhosle	
2005	Vaada	"Maula"	Himesh Reshammiya	Sameer Anjaan		
2005	Ek Ajnabee	"Barf Khushi Hai"	Vishal–Shekhar	Jaideep Sahni		
2005	Mangal Pandey: The Rising	"AI Madad Maula"	A. R. Rahman	Javed Akhtar	A. R. Rahman, Murtaza Khan, Kadhir	
2005	Mangal Pandey: The Rising	"Mangal Mangal"	A. R. Rahman	Javed Akhtar	Sukhwinder Singh	
2005	Mangal Pandey: The Rising	"Takey Takey"	A. R. Rahman	Javed Akhtar	Sukhwinder Singh, Kartik Das Baul	
2006	Corporate	"O Sikannder"	Shamir Tandon	Sandeep Nath	Sapna Mukherjee	
2007	Salaam-E-Ishq	"Ya Rabba"	Shankar-Ehsaan-Loy	Sameer		
2008	Humne Jeena Seekh Liya	Mera Yaar Tu	Pranit Gedham		Sunidhi Chauhan	
2008	Sarkar Raj	"Jalwa Re Jalwa"	Bapi-Tutul	Prashant Pandey	Sunayana Sarkar Dasgupta	
2008	Sarkar Raj	"The Jalwa – Club Mix"	Bapi-Tutul	Sandeep Nath	Sunayana Sarkar Dasgupta	
2008	Sarkar Raj	"Saam Daam"	Bapi-Tutul	Sandeep Nath		
2008	Sarkar Raj	"The Govinda – Chant"	Bapi-Tutul	Sandeep Nath	Bapi, Tutul	
2009	Kaminey	"Fatak"	Vishal Bhardwaj		Sukhwinder Singh	
2010	Love Sex Aur Dhokha	"LSD Title Track"	Sneha Khanwalkar	Dibakar Banerjee		
2010	Love Sex Aur Dhokha	"LSD Remix"	Sneha Khanwalkar	Dibakar Banerjee	Mikey McCleary, Nagarjuna	
2010	Love Sex Aur Dhokha	"Na Batati Tu"	Sneha Khanwalkar	Dibakar Banerjee		
2010	Love Sex Aur Dhokha	"Tainu TV Per Wekhya"	Sneha Khanwalkar	Dibakar Banerjee		
2010	Love Sex Aur Dhokha	"Tauba Tauba (Remix)"	Sneha Khanwalkar	Dibakar Banerjee		
2010	Love Sex Aur Dhokha	"Tu Gandi"	Sneha Khanwalkar	Dibakar Banerjee	Paresh Kamath, Naresh Kamath	
2015	Masaan	"Tumhari Nazrein Katam"	Indian Ocean	Varun Grover		
2017	Bank Chor	"Hum Hain Bank Chor"	Kailash Kher	Kailash Kher, Ambili	Ambili	
2017	Poster Boys	"Noor E Khuda"	Sunai Marathe, Shreyas Iyengar	Saurabh M Pandey		
2017	Sarkar 3	"Sam Dham"	Ravin Shankar			
2018	2.0	"Rakshassi"	A. R. Rahman	Abbas Tyrewala		
2018	2.0	"Nanhi Si Jaan"	A. R. Rahman	Amitabh Bhattacharya		
2018	Dassehra	"Hua Shankhnaad"	Vijay Varma	Rajesh Manthan		
2019	Kissebaaz	"Thiraktein"	Rohan-Rohan	Rohan Ghokale		
2019	Chicken Curry Law Transparency	"Ya Khudara Maaf Kar" Bol Re Dilli Bol	Shekar Shirrinn Annu Rizvi		Kailash Kher	
2019	Laal Kaptaan	"Taandav"	Samira Koppikar	Puneet Sharma		
2020	Gul Makai	"Maula Mere"	Amar Mohile			
2021	Mimi	"Choti Si Chiraiya"	A. R. Rahman	Amitabh Bhattacharya		
2022	Hai Tujhe Salaam India	"Vande Matram"	Yug Bhusal			
2022	Sharmaji Namkeen	"Boom Boom"	Sneha Khanwalkar	Gopal Datt	Raja Mushtaq	
2022	Shabaash Mithu	"Hindustan Meri Jaan"	Amit Trivedi	Swanand Kirkire	Ruchika	
2023	Fursat	"Lalkaar"	Vishal Bhardwaj	Gulzar		
2023	Nimmow Lucknow Wali	"Ae Maula Mere"	Yug Bhusal	Junaid Ali		
2023	La Vaste	"Rasta Chand"	Manojj Negi	Anurag Chaturvedi		
2023	OMG 2	"Ho Tayyar"	Pranaay	Ginny Dawan		
2023	Jawan	"Kalki Theme"	Anirudh Ravichander	Kausar Munir		
2023	Sir Madam Sarpanch	"Chiri Miri Chiri"	Sahil Kulkarni	Rohit Anand Chandwaskar		
2024	Hanu-Man	"Laage Bura Jaise"	Krishna Saurabh Surampalli	Subrat Sinha		
2024	Main Atal Hoon	"Ram Dhun"	Kailash Kher			
2024	Main Atal Hoon	"Hindu Tan Man"	Amitraj	Atal Bihari Vajpayee	Amitraj, Chorus	
2024	Accident or Conspiracy: Godhra	"Ho Mangalam"	V Rakx	MK Shivaaksh & Aman Pratap Singh		
2024	Razakar – Silent Genocide of Hyderabad	"Zinda Hai Tu"	Bheems Ceciroleo	Suddala Ashokteja, Kasarla Shyam		Hindi version
2024	Amar Singh Chamkila	"Bol Mohabbat"	A. R. Rahman	Irshad Kamil	A. R. Rahman	
2024	The Legacy Of Jineshwar	"Khartar"	Vipin Patwa	Prashant Beybaar		
2024	Pushpa 2: The Rule	"Kaali Mahaa Kaali"	Devi Sri Prasad	Raqueeb Alam		Hindi version

=== Kannada ===
Year	Film	Song	Composer(s)	Co-artist(s)
2007	Ee Preethi Yeke Bhoomi Melide	"Sulle Sullu"	R. P. Patnaik	Shankar Mahadevan
2007	Sajni	"Jaana O Jaana"	A. R. Rahman	Vasundhara Das
2007	Yuga	"Chenda Kane Chenda"	Arjun Janya	Shreya Ghoshal
2009	Cheluvina Chilipili	"Confusion Confusion"	Mickey J. Meyer	
2009	Junglee	"Hale Paatre"	V. Harikrishna	
2009	Parichaya	"O Nanna Olave"	Jassie Gift	
2009	Rajani	"Thiruboki"	Hamsalekha	
2010	Ekameva	"Nodaiah Gurikaara"	Saleem Puttur	
2010	Ekameva	"Mari Byada Sirivantha"	Saleem Puttur	
2010	Ekameva	"Mari Byada Sirivantha"(Solo)	Saleem Puttur	
2010	Jackie	"Ekka Raja Rani"	V. Harikrishna	
2010	Kari Chirathe	"Mathadu Mahadeva"	Sadhu Kokila	
2010	Kiccha Huccha	"Kamali Kamali"	V. Harikrishna	
2010	Krishnan Love Story	"Mosa Madalende"	V. Sridhar	
2010	Krishnan Love Story	"Mosa Madalende"(Bit)	V. Sridhar	
2010	Mylari	"Butbide"	Gurukiran	
2010	Naanu Nanna Kanasu	"Ondu Maamara"	Hamsalekha	
2010	Punda	"Pakkadmane Hudugana"	Mathews Manu	
2010	Shourya	"100% Preethi"	Sadhu Kokila	Anuradha Bhat
2010	Yaksha	"Aunty Kelu Anthapura"	Anoop Seelin	
2011	Aata	"Raama Rama"	Sadhu Kokila	Chinmayi
2011	Bodyguard	"Padma Yaakinge"	Vinaya Chandra	
2011	Hudugaru	"Yen Chandane Hudugi"	V. Harikrishna	Sukhwinder Singh
2011	Jedralli	"Chirathe Chiratheyo"	V. Sridhar	
2011	Jedralli	"Mathinalli Mava"	V. Sridhar	
2011	Jarasandha	"Yaradru Halagogli"	Arjun Janya	
2011	Jogayya	"Kuri Kolinaa"	V. Harikrishna	Shreya Ghoshal
2011	Johny Mera Naam Preethi Mera Kaam	"Diva Diva"	V. Harikrishna	
2011	Rajadhani	"I Wanna Do It"	Arjun Janya	
2011	Saarathi	"Vajra Ballalaraya"	V. Harikrishna	
2011	Uyyale	"Suvvale Suvvale"	DJ Ricky	
2011	Uyyale	"Ee Manasu"	DJ Ricky	
2012	Alemari	"Thundu Beedi"	Arjun Janya	
2012	Arakshaka	"Thu Nan Makla"	Gurukiran	
2012	Chingari	"Baare Baare"	V. Harikrishna	
2012	Dev Son of Mudde Gowda	"Jalaja"	Jassie Gift	
2012	Kalaya Tasmai Namaha	"Preethi Andare"	AM Neel	
2012	Kalaya Tasmai Namaha	"Preethi Yaako"	AM Neel	
2012	Ko Ko	"Labaa Labaa Labaa"	Ramana Gogula	
2012	Mr. 420	"Tamate Soundu"	V. Harikrishna	
2012	Prem Adda	"Melkote Hudugi"	V. Harikrishna	
2012	Sidlingu	"Chombo Chombu"	Anoop Seelin	
2012	Villain	"Gelathi Ninninda"	Gurukiran	
2012	Yaare Koogadali	"Kempaado Kempaado"	V. Harikrishna	
2013	Barfi	"Kaage Kannu"	Arjun Janya	
2013	Bhajarangi	"Re Re Bhajarangi"	Arjun Janya	
2013	Brindavana	"Thangali"	V. Harikrishna	
2013	Dilwala	"Heng Hengo"	Arjun Janya	
2013	Jinke Mari	"Hudgeerna Mundbitte"	Sai Karthik	
2013	Mahanadi	"Hoove Hoove"	AM Neel	
2013	Pade Pade	"Byada Maga Byada Maga"	Sathish Aryan	
2013	Victory	"Yakka Nin Magalu"	Arjun Janya	
2014	Darling	"Dabba Song"	Arjun Janya	
2014	Oggarane	"Ee Janumave Ahaa"	Ilaiyaraaja	
2014	Paramashiva	"Paramashiva"	Arjun Janya	
2014	Pungi Daasa	"Aajare Aajare"	Farhan Roshan	
2015	Bettanagere	"Harakeya Thandevamma"	Rajesh Ramanath	
2015	Eradondla Mooru	"Preethine Devru"	AM Neel	
2015	Muddu Manase	"Neev Kelabardu"	Vineet Raj Menon	
2015	Mythri	"Chandranenu Chanda"	Ilaiyaraaja	
2016	Dana Kayonu	"Baare Gange"	V. Harikrishna	
2016	Madha Mathu Manasi	"Byada Maga"	Mano Murthy	
2016	Nagarahavu	"Suttha Muttha"	Gurukiran	
2016	The Great Story of Sodabuddi	"Kaddil Keredare"	Mithun MS	
2017	Ajaramara	"Evala Rekkeya"	Rajkishor Rao	
2017	Ajaramara	"O Guduge"	Rajkishor Rao	
2017	Anjani Putra	"Chanda Chanda"	Ravi Basrur	
2017	Maasthi Gudi	"Jeenu Thandevo"	Sadhu Kokila	
2017	March 22	"Muthu Ratnada Pyate"	Manikanth Kadri	
2018	Ananthu vs Nusrath	"Pyaar Moula"	Sunaad Gowtham	
2018	Huccha 2	"Harahara Harahara"	Anoop Seelin	
2018	Kanaka	"Duniyadalle Don"	Naveen Sajju	
2018	Kichchu	"Mylekunthaa Madesha"	Arjun Janya	
2018	MMCH	"Adrustakkondu Enhi Beku"	V. Sridhar	
2018	Rankal Raate	"Amma Ninna"	Avinash Sriram	
2018	Tharakaasura	"Kolumunde Madhesha"	Dharma Vish	
2018	The Villain	"Tick Tick Tick"	Arjun Janya	
2019	Bazaar	"Ondooralli Obba Yajamana"	Ravi Basrur	
2019	Odeya	"Malavalli Maavana"	Arjun Janya	
2019	Pailwaan	"Baaro Pailwan"	Arjun Janya	
2019	Rustum	"Devara Aghaada"	Anoop Seelin	
2019	Seetharama Kalyana	"Bhoomiye Mantapa"	Anup Rubens	
2019	Seetharama Kalyana	"Yaara Shaapa Idu"	Anup Rubens	
2019	Vijayaratha	"Jai Anjaneya"	Prem Kumar S	
2019	Thrayodasha	"Bidar Sulthan"	AM Neel	
2021	Kode Muruga	"Koli Kaalige Gejje"	M S Thyagaraj	
2021	Bhajarangi 2	"Rere Rere Bhajarangi"	Arjun Janya	
2021	Na Kolikke Ranga	"Mareyo Dunte"	Raju Emmiganur	
2021	Ek Love Ya	"Yennegu Hennigu"	Arjun Janya	Mangli
2024	KD: The Devil	"Shiva Shiva"	Arjun Janya	Prem
2025	Gatha Vaibhava	"Ship Song"	Judah Sandhy	Chethan Naik, Chinmayi L
2026	Chowkidar	"Oh My Bro"	Sachin Basrur	
2026	The Rise of Ashoka	"Yelo Maadeva"	Poornachandra Tejaswi	Sadhvini Koppa, Siddhu

=== Tamil ===
Year	Film	Song	Composer(s)	Co-artist(s)
2005	Majaa	"Podhumadaa Saami"	Vidyasagar	
2006	Thalaimagan	"Penakaaran"	Paul J	Yogeswaran Manikkam, Veeramani
2006	Veyil	"Veyilodu Vilaiyadi"	G. V. Prakash Kumar	Jassie Gift, Tippu, Prasanna
2007	Lee	"Yaaru Yaaru"	D. Imman	
2007	Oram Po	"Kozhi Kaalu"	G. V. Prakash Kumar	Jassie Gift
2008	Abhiyum Naanum	"Ore Oru Oorilae"	Vidyasagar	
2008	Abhiyum Naanum	"Chinnamma Kalyanam"	Vidyasagar	
2008	Bheema	"Rangu Rangamma"	Harris Jayaraj	Vijay Yesudas, Swarnalatha
2008	Dhaam Dhoom	"Uyyalaalo"	Harris Jayaraj	Sujatha Mohan
2008	Dindigul Sarathy	"Ammadi Athadi"	Dhina	
2008	Kuselan	"Perinba Pechukaran"	G. V. Prakash Kumar	V. V. Prasanna
2008	Poi Solla Porom	"Gandhi Note Kaiyil"	M. G. Sreekumar	
2009	Arundhati	"Gummiruttil"	Koti	
2009	Arundhati	"Enna Viratham"	Koti	
2009	Arundhati	"Thikku Ettum"	Koti	
2009	Yean Ippadi Mayakkinaai	"Yennavo Seidhai"	Lakshman Ramalinga	Shreya Ghoshal
2010	Thillalangadi	"Memory Loss"	Yuvan Shankar Raja	Ranjith
2014	Un Samayal Arayil	"Intha Porapu Thaan"	Ilaiyaraaja	
2015	Aambala	"Madras To Madurai"	Hiphop Tamizha	Vishnupriya Ravi, Maria Roe Vincent
2015	Baahubali: The Beginning	"Moochile"	M. M. Keeravani	
2015	Vasuvum Saravananum Onna Padichavanga	"Vasuvum Saravananum"	D. Imman	Sooraj Santhosh
2016	Aranmanai 2	"Maayaa Maayaa"	Hiphop Tamizha	Padmalatha
2016	Shivanagam	"Ettithukkum"	Gurukiran	
2017	Mersal	"Aalaporaan Thamizhan"	A. R. Rahman	D. Sathyaprakash, Deepak Blue, Pooja Vaidyanath
2018	Sandakozhi 2	"Alalaa"	Yuvan Shankar Raja	
2020	Psycho	"Thaaimadiyil Naan"	Ilaiyaraaja	
2021	Sulthan	"Pudhu Saththam"	Vivek–Mervin	Vivek Siva, Sameera Bharadwaj
2022	Kaari	"Goppamavaney"	D. Imman	Madhu Balakrishnan
2023	Om Vellimalai	"Raavura"	Vikram Selva	Surmukhi

=== Telugu songs ===
Year	Film	Song	Composer	Co-singer
2005	Majaa	"Yevariki Yevari"	Vidyasagar	
2006	Sarada Saradaga	"Malle Malle"	S. V. Krishna Reddy	
2006	Vesavi	"Yendalne Vetadi"	G. V. Prakash Kumar	
2007	Munna	"Konchem Konncem"	Harris Jayaraj	
2008	Bheema	"Rangu Rangamma"	Harris Jayaraj	
2008	Kathanayakudu	"Ra Ra Ra Ramayanna"	G. V. Prakash Kumar	
2008	Parugu	"Yelagelaga"	Mani Sharma	
2009	Aakasamantha	"Okanoka Oorilo"	Vidyasagar	
2009	Aakasamantha	"Chinnamma Kalyanam"	Vidyasagar	
2009	Arundhati	"Kammukonna"	Koti	
2011	Rajanna	"Karakuraathi Gundello"	M. M. Keeravani	
2012	Genius	"Allah"	Joshua Sridhar	
2012	Nuvva Nena	"Blackberry"	Bheems Ceciroleo	
2013	Chandee	"Alluri Seetharama"	S R Shankar	
2013	Mirchi	"Pandagala"	Devi Sri Prasad	
2013	Mirchi	"Nee Choopula"	Devi Sri Prasad	
2014	Galipatam	"Yeh Allah"	Bheems Ceciroleo	
2014	Prabhanjanam	"Amba Jagadamba"	R. P. Patnaik	
2014	Ulavacharu Biryani	"Ee Janmame"	Ilaiyaraaja	
2015	Gopala Gopala	"Endhuko Endhuko"	Anup Rubens	
2015	Rudhramadevi	"Mathagajame"	Ilaiyaraaja	
2016	Nagabharanam	"Vedhamanti Roopanive"	Gurukiran	
2016	!Nirmala Convent	"Mundhu Nuyya"	Roshan Saluri	
2017	Adhirindhi	"Paalinchara"	A. R. Rahman	
2017	Jaya Janaki Nayaka	"Veede Veede"	Devi Sri Prasad	
2017	Napoleon	"Pranamaa"	Sidhartha Sadasivuni	
2017	Sapthagiri LLB	"Emaindi Emaindi"	Vijay Bulganin	
2017	Saranam Gacchami	"Nagumomu Namaha"	Ravi Kalyan	
2018	Aravinda Sametha Veera Raghava	"Yeda Poyinado"	S. Thaman	
2018	Bharat Ane Nenu	"Vachadayyo Saami"	Devi Sri Prasad	
2018	Saakshyam	"Shivam Shivam"	Harshavardhan Rameshwar	
2018	Saakshyam	"Gange Jayamu"	Harshavardhan Rameshwar	
2018	Sharabha	"Saami Velisenu Raa"	Koti	
2019	Aksharam	" Aksharam Title Song"	Shashi Preetam	
2019	Chitralahari	"Prayathname"	Devi Sri Prasad	
2019	Diksoochi	"Mattilona Mattira"	Padmanav Bharadwaj	
2019	Falaknuma Das	"Dasu Bindasu"	Vivek Sagar	
2019	Udhyama Simham	"Jayaho Jananetha"	Dilip Bandari	
2020	Pressure Cooker	"Cheli Cheli"	Sunil Kashyap	
2021	Uppena	"Silaka Silaka"	Devi Sri Prasad	
2021	Sulthan	"Santhosham"	Vivek–Mervin	
2021	Konda Polam	"Kadhalu Kadhaluga"	M. M. Keeravani	Yamini Ghantasala
2021	Pushpaka Vimanam	"Aaha"	Siddharth Sadhasivuni	
2021	Gamanam	"Song Of Life"	Ilaiyaraaja	
2022	@Love	"Soothunnavaa"	Sunny Manik	
2023	Richie Gaadi Pelli	"Emitidhi Mathiledha"	Sathyan	
2023	Rudhrangi	"Rudhrangi Title Song	Nawfal Raja AIS	
2023	Nayakudu	"Kanna Kanna"	A. R. Rahman	
2023	Narakasura	"Chaatinchara"	Nawfal Raja AIS	
2024	Purushothamudu	"Bhallantu"	Gopi Sundar	
2024	Mechanic	"Amma Yevvaro"	Vinod Yajamanya	Muni Sahekara
2024	Weekend Party	"Palleturilone Sadhyam"	Sadhachandra	
2024	Swag	"Englandu Rani"	Vivek Sagar	
2025	23 Iravai Moodu	"Egaraale"	Mark K Robin	
2025	Akhanda 2	"The Thaandavam"	Thaman S	Shankar Mahadevan, Deepak Blue

=== Bhojpuri ===
Year	Film	Song	Composer(s)	Co-artist(s)
2005	Dulha Milal Dildar	"Balo Se Tel Nikal Jala"		Solo
2006	Humka Aisa Waisa Na Samjha	"Ram Kare Kekro Na Mile"		
2006	Rangli Chunariya Tohre Naam	"Chal Chal Re Batohiya Bhai"		

=== Malayalam ===
Year	Film	Song	Composer(s)	Co-artist(s)
2003	Kilichundan Mampazham	"Parayuka Nee Kadha"	Vidyasagar	

=== Marathi ===
Year	Film	Song	Composer(s)	Lyricist(s)	Co-artist(s)
2024	Shivrayancha Chhava	"Sihasani Baisale Shambu Raje"	Devdutta Manisha Baji	Digpal Lanjekar	

=== Gujarati ===
Year	Film	Song	Composer(s)	Lyricist(s)	Co-artist(s)
2022	Nayika Devi: The Warrior Queen	Shambhu Shankara"	Parth Bharat Thakkar	Chirag Tripathi	

=== Bengali ===
Year	Film	Song	Composer(s)	Co-artist(s)
2014	Arundhati	"Joy Joy Ma"	Koti	

=== Odia ===
Year	Film	Song	Composer(s)	Writer(s)	Co-artist(s)
2007	Tumaku Paruni Ta Bhuli	"Na Na Nare Jibana Dau Sadhena"	Malay Misra	Bijaya Malla	

== Lyricist ==
Year	Film	Song(s)
2005	Kaal	"Aankhiyaan Teriya Ve"
2007	Traffic Signal	All Songs
2008	Dasvidaniya	All Songs
2009	Chandni Chowk To China	"S.I.D.H.U., Chak Lein De"

== Music director ==
Year	Film	Notes
2008	Dasvidaniya	
2009	Sangini- Perfect Bride	
2014	Desi Kattey	

== Non-film songs ==
=== Solo albums and compilations ===
Year	Album(s)	Notes
2005	Aawargi	
2006	Kailasa	
2007	Jhoomo Re	With "Saiyaan" receiving critical acclaim as his best song ever
2009	Chaandan Mein	GiMA Award for Best Popular Album
2009	Yatra: The Nomadic Souls	
2011	Only Love	Nepali Album
2012	Rangeele	
2013	Naina Chaar	Collaboration with Shreya Ghoshal
2016	Ishq Anokha	
2016	Bhole Chale	
2021	Hum Hindustani (Single)	Collaboration with various artists

=== Television ===
Year	Serial(s)	Song(s)	Channel
2021	Jai Kanhaiya Lal Ki	Haathi Ghoda Paalki, Jai Kanhaiya Lal Ki	Star Bharat
2010	Tere Liye	"Tere Liye"	Star Plus
2011	Diya Aur Baati Hum	"Diya Aur Baati Hum"	Star Plus
2014	Udaan	"Hauslon Ki Udaan"	Colors TV
2007	Humsafar: The Train	Humsafar:The Train	DD National

=== Web series ===
Year	Show	Song	Music	Lyrics	Co-artist(s)	Note	Ref.
2021	Dhindora	"Dhindora"	Sneha Khanwalkar	Bhuvan Bam			

== Filmography ==
=== Guest appearances ===
Year	Show	Notes	Channel
2014	Comedy Nights with Kapil	Special appearance in the occasion of holi celebrations	Colors
