= Naina Chaar =

Single by Shreya Ghoshal and Kailash Kher
- Released: 16 September 2013
- Recorded: Kailasa Studios, Mumbai, India
- Genre: Indian pop
- Length: 5:35
- Label: Sony Music India
- Songwriter: Kailash Kher
- Producers: Naresh Kamath; Paresh Kamath

Music video
- "Naina Chaar" on YouTube

Naina Chaar is an Indian pop song performed by singers Shreya Ghoshal and Kailash Kher. The song was written by Kailash Kher and produced by Naresh Kamath and Paresh Kamath, from his band Kailasa. It was released on 16 September 2013 by Sony Music India.

== Development ==
"As an artiste, it is a refreshing change for me to work on something independently. The track is called, "Naina Chaar", and it is a song of love. We have just recorded the scratch; the production work is underway. This collaboration is different because here we have two established voices teaming up, rather than one veteran and one upcoming, which is what one usually sees on these shows."

— Shreya Ghoshal about her experience in being a part of 'The Project Resound'

The exclusively online initiative by Sony Music, of which the song was a part, was titled 'Project Resound' and it marked the first collaboration between veteran Indian singers Shreya Ghoshal and Kailash Kher, who were asked to share their knowledge about music genres and Indian languages. 'Upgrade your ears' was the tagline of the project, and according to Sony, its principal target was to make the youth generation aware of the different qualities of music that they hear on their headphones. Thereby, "Naina Chaar" was recorded as a promotional song for Sony Headphones. Regarding this, Sanjeev Jasani, senior vice-president of OgilvyOne, stated in an interview— "We understood early on that no product advertising could achieve our client's objectives. Sony wanted to target music lovers who were listening to music on-the-go. Also, the company observed how closely young music lovers follow their music idols. The power of recommendation commanded by celebrities can be leveraged only when the brand message is not all about pushing products."

"We’d like to inspire young people to upgrade their ears by using Sony headphones. It will enable them to enjoy sound quality as recorded in a studio."

— Kailash Kher

The mission was aimed at presenting a pristine form of music through their vocal and musical abilities, which was beyond the boundaries of the music of Bollywood or filmi music. It was also decided that the singers' collaboration would be recorded in series and presented in the form of an episodic documentary, such that music lovers too could experience the process of composing music. Finally, a web concert featuring both the singers was planned in which the full song would be officially unveiled. Kailash Kher, who has written and composed "Naina Chaar", described it as 'a rustic song with earthy lyrics'. Besides the web episodes and web concert, Sony also introduced other engagement activities like quiz on the journeys of both the singers, AR app from Ghoshal and Kher greeting fans and sharing signed photographs and an online voting system for the selection of songs to be performed at the web concert. A new microsite was also launched by Sony for their home audio-video products. In an interview, Sanjeev Jasani commented— "Kailash sings at a very high octave and Shreya signs at a lower octave with a much softer voice which helped the project to bring in two different sets of music experience for the ears of the music lovers."

== Web episodes ==
The 'Project Resound' were shot over 45 days and were digitally released as nine web episodes by a Delhi-based production house UnCommonSense Films. Prior to the web episodes, personal interview videos of Kailash Kher and Shreya Ghoshal were also released.

Episode No.	Title	Description (as provided by Sony)	Ref.
1	The journey begins with a simple tune	Kailash has a tune stuck in his head. What will he do?	
2	Shreya & Kailash - A meeting of minds	Two artists unite in the quest for pure sound.	
3	A new song is born	Shreya meets Kailash and a new musical journey begins.	
4	How do you define music?	The artists discuss genres and ask fans how they feel.	
5	The wonder of words	Kailash & Shreya discuss the lyrics of their new song.	
6	Magical melodies	Kailash & Shreya add a touch of magic to their song.	
7	Naina Chaar - A Sneak Preview	Catch a glimpse of Shreya and Kailasa's new song.	
8	Jugalbandi - A Game of Songs	Shreya & Kailash sing each other's favourite tunes.	
9	A Celebration of Pure Sound	A special composition to celebrate the purity of sound.	

== Web concert ==
The 'Project Resound' web concert, held on 12 September 2013 (from 4 p.m. onwards), marked the end of the nine web episodes, when "Naina Chaar" was released. Both singers Shreya Ghoshal and Kailash Kher performed some of their chart-busters, which were selected through an online voting system operated by Sony, to all their fans.

Songs performed by Shreya Ghoshal

- "Jaadu Hai Nasha Hai" (Jism)
- "Tujh Mein Rab Dikhta Hai" (Rab Ne Bana Di Jodi)
- "Saans" (Jab Tak Hai Jaan)
- "Agar Tum Mil Jao" (Zeher)
- "Teri Ore" (Singh Is Kinng)
- "Radha" (Student of the Year)

Songs performed by Kailash Kher

- "Babam Bam" (Jhoomo Re)
- "Teri Deewani" (Kailasa)
- "Yadaan Teriyan" (Rangeele)
- "Albeliya" (Rangeele)
- "Saiyyaan" (Jhoomo Re)

== Release and reception ==
"Naina Chaar" was an instant success since its release. The official song was digitally released on 16 September 2013. Reportedly, the 'Project Resound' web episodes received 4,60,000 visits during the campaign period. "Naina Chaar" also got about 2,85,000 downloads and above 3,00,000 views on YouTube (as of March 2014). A research by Nielsen Holdings also revealed a remarkable success of Sony. Besides rising sales, Sony also experienced a record increase in inquiries across multi-brand outlets. Owing to the success of the song, Shreya Ghoshal was also reported to have crooned the song in many of her concerts. As per a report of Unmetric, "Naina Chaar" was one of the top 5 popular videos of Sony India's YouTube channel. Also, the campaign received traffic from 70 different countries other than India, thereby giving evidence of the global impact of the song. A commercial advertisement of Sony headphones featuring Ghoshal was released afterwards, and "Naina Chaar" was used in the background.

== Personnel ==
As listed by Sony Music India.

- Naresh Kamath – music producer, upright bass, backing vocals
- Paresh Kamath – music producer, acoustic-electric guitar
- Jovian Soans – mixing
- Neeraj Singh – recordist
- Bob Katz – mastering
- Sanket Naik – percussions
- Rinku Rajput – piano
- Kurt Peters – drums
- Vian Periera – cello
- Jitendra Thakur – violin
- Sanjiv Rao – violin
- Dharmendra Javda – violin
- Abhijeet Majumdar – violin
