= Shreya Ghoshal filmography =

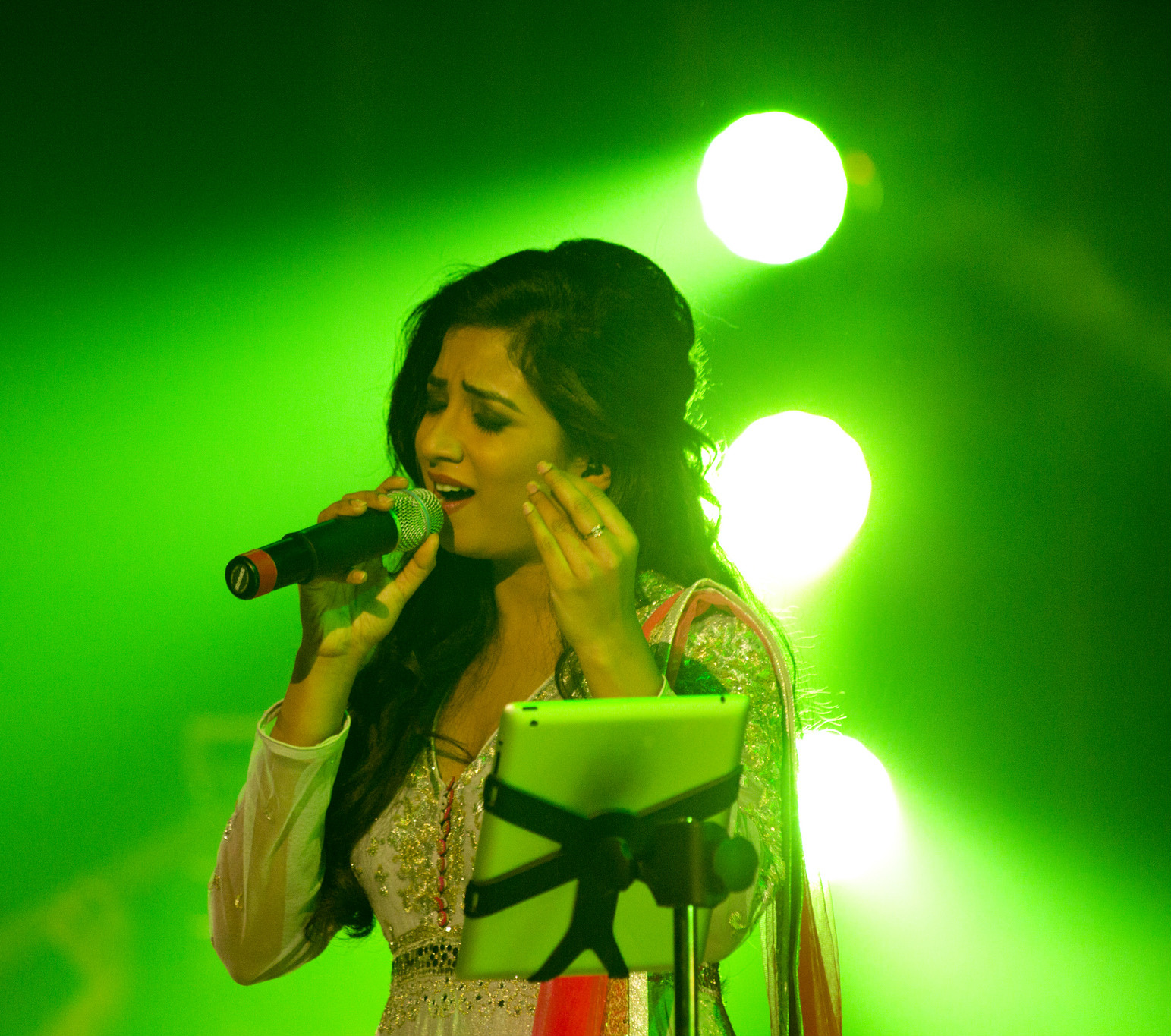
Shreya Ghoshal

Shreya Ghoshal (born 12 March 1984) is an Indian playback singer. She has received five National Film Awards, six Filmfare Awards including five for Best Female Playback Singer, nine Filmfare Awards South for Best Female Playback Singer (four for Malayalam, two for Tamil, two for Kannada, and one for Telugu), Four Kerala State Film Awards and two Tamil Nadu State Film Awards. She has recorded songs for film music and albums in various Indian languages and has established herself as a leading playback singer of Indian cinema.

== Filmography ==
Year	Name	Role	Notes	Channel	Ref
1996	Sa Re Ga Ma (now Sa Re Ga Ma Pa)	Contestant and winner	Participated and won the show. Her music career in Bollywood began when film maker and music director Sanjay Leela Bhansali noticed her on the show.	Zee TV	
2003	Saaya	Herself	Besides providing vocals for song "Har Taraf", she also made her first on-screen appearance in the film.	—N/a	
2004	Hanan	Herself	Performed a song	—N/a	
2007	STAR Voice of India	Judge	Served as the judge for the first season with singer Kunal Ganjawala and composer Pritam Chakraborty.	STAR Plus	
2009	Music Ka Maha Muqqabla	Group captain	She was a captain on the show along with Shankar Mahadevan, Shaan, Himesh Reshammiya, Mohit Chauhan and Mika Singh.	STAR Plus	
2010	Mahayatra : Rishton Ka Anokha Safar	Herself	Appeared in the first episode of the show where she sang Maha Aarti of Lord Ganesha, wished good luck to the contestants for their journey then proceed for the sthanpana of Lord Ganesha.	STAR Plus	
2011	Malik Ek Sur Anek	Herself	Performed a song on Sai Baba.	STAR Plus	
2011	X Factor India	Judge	One of the three judges with Sonu Nigam and Sanjay Leela Bhansali.	Sony TV	
2011	Joyalukkas (TV commercial)	Herself	Besides acting and singing in Joyalukkas, she also became the brand ambassador. Besides Hindi, she also sung the Jingle in Malayalam, Tamil and Kannada languages.	—N/a	
2011	Aparajita Tumi	Herself	She was featured in Bengali song.	—N/a	
2012	Josco Indian Voice	Guest	Sang her various songs including Lata Mangeshkar's "Mhara Re Giridhar Gopal", a Meera Bhajan.	Mazhavil Manorama	
2012	Ghoshal on Asianet	Herself	Sung a song "Surmayi Akhiyon Mein Nanha Munha Ek Sapna" with K. J. Yesudas.	Asianet	
2013	Indian Idol Junior	Judge	Appeared as a judge for the first season of Indian Idol Junior along with Vishal–Shekhar.	Sony TV	
2013	Project Resound	Herself	Collaborated with singer Kailash Kher for the song "Naina Chaar" and she also sung her own songs.	Sony Music India	
2014	Kismat Se	Herself	Music video with A. R. Rahman.	Sony Music India	
2016	Mana Ho Tum Medley	Herself	Performed songs including "Mana Ho Tum Medley" with Yesudas and Vijay.	Manorama Online	
2016	MTV Unplugged	Herself	She performed six songs in Season 6 of the show.	MTV Beats and MTV	
2017	Gulzar in conversation with Tagore	Herself	Performed "Singaar Ko Rehne Do" and "Bhuj Gaya Tha Kyun Diya" music videos with Shaan, Gulzar and Shantanu Moitra.	Saregama	
2017	Sa Re Ga Ma Pa Bangla	Guest	She appears as a guest in the show on grand finale episode.	Zee Bangla	
2017	T-Series Mixtape	Herself	Performed "Sun Raha Hai Rozana"	T-Series (company)	
2017	Dhadkane Azad Hain	Herself	Debut in her first independent single	Ghoshal's YouTube Channel	
2017	Swartarang	Herself	Performed "Jiv Rangala" in special musical evening organised for Mumbai Police.	Zee Marathi	
2018	Tere Bina	Herself	Second independent single of Ghoshal.	Ghoshal's YouTube Channel	
2019	Shabad Aag Ki Khushboo	Herself	Performed "Ek Onkar"	Virtual Bharat YouTube Channel	
2019	T-Series Mixtape (Season 2)	Herself	Performed "Tum Hi Ho Rehnuma" along with co-singer Armaan Malik	T-Series (company)	
2020	Nah Woh Main	Herself	Third independent single of Ghoshal	Ghoshal's YouTube Channel	
2021	Angana Morey	Herself	Independent single of Ghoshal	Ghoshal's YouTube Channel	
2022	Star Singer season 8	Grand finale Jury		Asianet	
2023	Indian Idol	Guest judge	Played guest judge with regular judges Himesh Reshammiya and Vishal Dadlani	Sony Entertainment Television	
2023	Sa Re Ga Ma Pa Seniors (season 3)	Grand Finale Guest		Zee Tamil	
2023 -present	Indian Idol	Judge		Sony Entertainment Television	

== Special appearances ==
Year	Program	Channel	Ref
2008	Seedhi Baat	Aaj Tak	
2014	Interview with Zee TV USA	Zee TV USA	
2016	Off The Record	MTV Beats	
2016	B4U Music Talk Of The Town	B4U	
2017	Yaar Mera Superstar Season 2	Zoom	
2017	In Conversation With Shreya Ghoshal	Zee TV USA	
2017	Hangout with Renil Abraham	Firstpost	

== See also ==
- List of songs recorded by Shreya Ghoshal
