= QGM =

QGM may refer to:

- Queen's Gallantry Medal, an award described at King's Gallantry Medal
- Quick Gun Murugun, a 2009 Indian cowboy movie spoof
- Centre for Quantum Geometry of Moduli Spaces at Aarhus University, Denmark
