= Dasvidaniya =

2008 Hindi film by Shashant Shah

- Poster
- Directed by: Shashant Shah
- Written by: Arshad Syed
- Produced by: Guneet Monga; Vinay Pathak; Azam Khan
- Starring: Vinay Pathak; Sarita Joshi; Neha Dhupia; Rajat Kapoor; Brijendra Kala
- Cinematography: Arun Varma
- Music by: Kailash Kher
- Production companies: Sikhya Entertainment; One More Thought Entertainment; Lemontea Productions; YT Entertainment
- Release date: 7 November 2008
- Country: India
- Language: Hindi
- Box office: ₹ 1.87 crore

Dasvidaniya is a 2008 Indian Hindi-language comedy drama film directed by Shashant Shah and written by Arshad Syed. The film stars Vinay Pathak alongside Neha Dhupia, Rajat Kapoor, and Sarita Joshi. It was released on 7 November 2008. Inspired by the Hollywood film The Bucket List (2007), it follows a man who creates a list of ten things to do before his death. The title is a pun on this concept and is derived from the Russian phrase "до свидания" (do svidaniya), meaning "goodbye." The film was released on 7 November 2008.

== Synopsis ==
Amar Kaul (Vinay Pathak) is a 37-year-old accounts manager at Suraj Pharmaceuticals in Mumbai. He is single and lives with his mother (Sarita Joshi). He lives a nondescript life with people oblivious to his existence. One day his doctor tells him that he will die within three months due to stomach cancer. Realising that his time is limited, Amar makes a list of ten things he wants to do in his life and sets out to do them. They are:

1. Buy a red car.
2. Tour abroad.
3. Play guitar.
4. Confess his unrequited love for his childhood crush, Neha.
5. Stand up to his boss.
6. Visit his old friend Rajiv Jhulka.
7. Experience romance.
8. Reveal his condition to his mother.
9. Have his photo published in the newspaper.
10. Mend his relationship with his younger brother.

He finds the true joys of life in a few months, which were hidden all his life. After three months, at the time of his death, he leaves something for all his loved ones, leaving them happy and thankful to him.

== Cast ==
- Vinay Pathak as Amar Kaul
- Neha Dhupia as Neha Bhanot
- Gaurav Gera as Vivek Kaul
- Rajat Kapoor as Rajiv Jhulka
- Sarita Joshi as Amar's mother
- Saurabh Shukla as Dasgupta, Amar's boss
- Suchitra Pillai as Suchi R. Jhulka
- Ranvir Shorey as Jagtap
- Suresh Menon as self
- Joy Fernandes as Savio
- Purbi Joshi as Garima
- Manoylo Svitlana as Tatanya
- Brijendra Kala as Shira

== Soundtrack ==
Dasvidaniya

Soundtrack album by Kailasa
- Released: 2008
- Genre: Feature film soundtrack
- Label: Sony Music

Kailasa chronology
| Jhoomo Re (2007) | Dasvidaniya (2008) | Chandni Chowk to China (2008) |

The music for all the songs were composed by Kailash Kher.

| # | Title | Singer(s) | Lyricist | Duration |
|---|---|---|---|---|
| 1 | "O Maa Meri Maa Pyaari Maa – Mammaa" | Kailash Kher | Kailash Kher | 04:30 |
| 2 | "Sare Sehar Ki Jagmag Ke Bitar Hai Andhera – Alvida" | Kailash Kher | Kailash Kher | 05:03 |
| 3 | "Muskura Mere Dil" | Sonu Nigam | Kailash Kher, Naresh Kamath, Paresh Kamath – The Kailasa Band | 03:40 |
| 4 | "Muskura Mere Dil (Inst)" | Instrumental | Kailash Kher, Naresh Kamath, Paresh Kamath – The Kailasa Band | 03:15 |
| 5 | "Sare Sehar Ki Jagmag Ke Bitar Hai Andhera – Alvida (Remix)" | Kailash Kher | Kailash Kher, Naresh Kamath, Paresh Kamath – The Kailasa Band | 04:20 |

== Release ==
=== Box office ===
Dasvidaniya collected ₹1.87 crore (US$190,000) in its lifetime run.

=== Critical reception ===
Gaurav Malani of Indiatimes Movies gave the film 3 stars, praising the cast, dialogue and scripting and recommended that the movie "should top the list of your 10 most important things to do this weekend."
