= Ranvir Vinay Aur Kaun? =

- A promotional image of "Ranvir Vinay Aur Kaun?".
- Created by: Lemon Tea Productions
- Starring: Vinay Pathak; Ranvir Shorey
- Opening theme: "Ranvir Vinay Aur Kaun?" by ??
- Country of origin: India
- No. of seasons: 1
- No. of episodes: 52

Production
- Running time: approx. 22 minutes

Original release
- Network: STAR One
- Release: 6 August – 1 November 2007

Ranvir Vinay Aur Kaun? (transl. Ranvir, Vinay and Who Else?) is a Hindi talk show that aired on STAR One. Hosted by Vinay Pathak and Ranvir Shorey, the show regularly featured celebrity guests and comedy gags. The show, which was launched on 6 August 2007, ran for 52 episodes and ended on 1 November 2007.

== Guests ==
- Abhijeet Bhattacharya
- Urvashi Dholakia
- Shakti Kapoor
- David Dhawan
- Sarita Joshi
- Deven Bhojani
- Javed Akhtar
- Tanushree Dutta
- Tusshar Kapoor
- Sandhya Mridul
- Gulshan Grover
- Archana Puran Singh
- Kiron Kher
- Meghna Naidu
- Kim Sharma
- Karan Johar
- Konkona Sen Sharma
- Asrani
