= Chandni Chowk to China =

2009 Indian film by Nikkhil Advani

- Theatrical release poster
- Directed by: Nikkhil Advani
- Screenplay by: Rajat Arora; Shridhar Raghavan
- Story by: Rajat Arora; Shridhar Raghavan
- Produced by: Rohan Sippy; Ramesh Sippy; Mukesh Talreja
- Starring: Akshay Kumar; Deepika Padukone; Mithun Chakraborty; Ranvir Shorey; Roger Yuan; Gordon Liu
- Cinematography: Himman Dhamija
- Edited by: Aarif Sheikh
- Music by: Songs: Shankar–Ehsaan–Loy; Kailasa; Kailash Kher; Naresh-Paresh; Bappi Lahiri; Bohemia; Score: Daniel B. George
- Production companies: Ramesh Sippy Entertainment; People Tree Films
- Distributed by: Warner Bros. Pictures
- Release date: 16 January 2009
- Running time: 156 minutes
- Country: India
- Language: Hindi
- Budget: ₹80 crore
- Box office: ₹53.44–56.22 crore

Chandni Chowk to China (shortened to CC2C) is a 2009 Indian Hindi-language martial arts action comedy film directed by Nikkhil Advani and produced by Rohan Sippy, Ramesh Sippy and Mukesh Talreja under the banners of Ramesh Sippy Entertainment and People Tree Films respectively. The film stars Akshay Kumar and Deepika Padukone alongside Mithun Chakraborty, Ranvir Shorey, Roger Yuan and Gordon Liu. The film revolves around a vegetable cutter from Chandni Chowk in Delhi who finds himself on an adventure in China after the residents of an oppressed village deem him to be the reincarnation of a slain Chinese revolutionary.

It is Warner Bros. Pictures' first Hindi film. The film was released on 16 January 2009, however it bombed at the box office. Indiagames had also released a mobile video game based on the film. Later, it gained significant popularity on television and has since become a cult film.

== Plot ==
The film begins with the story of the Great Wall of China and the brave warrior Liu Sheng. It then shows the evil smuggler Hojo's tyranny in the village of Zhange in the present.

Sidhesh Sharma, aka Sidhu, is a simple vegetable cutter at a roadside food stall in the Chandni Chowk section of Delhi. He consults astrologers, tarot card readers, and fake fakirs to turn around his destiny despite his foster father, Dada, pushing him to believe in himself instead. When two Zhange villagers from China claim him as a reincarnation of 'Liu Sheng,' Sidhu, encouraged by trickster Chopstick, believes he will be feted as a hero and travels to China with them, unaware of his recruitment to assassinate Hojo and free the village.

On the way to China, Sidhu meets Sakhi, an Indian-Chinese spokesmodel. Her twin sister Suzy, known as the femme fatale Meow Meow, works for Hojo, not knowing the truth: that Hojo tried to kill her father, Inspector Chiang, and stole her from him as a baby. Chiang is now an amnesiac vagrant living around the Great Wall tourist area. Sidhu realizes the truth about why he was brought to the village. Scared, he apologizes to Hojo, exposing himself as a loser to the village. Dada arrives and starts beating Hojo's men, yelling at Sidhu to stand and fight. Hojo kills Dada and dumps Sidhu over the Great Wall. Injured and disgraced, Sidhu is saved by the amnesiac Chiang from falling to his death and spends three months healing. Upon waking up, he is devastated at losing Dada and vows revenge. Meanwhile, Chopstick, similarly devastated at being responsible for what happened to Sidhu, has infiltrated Hojo's gang to help reunite Sakhi with Suzy.

During Sidhu's first attempt at attacking Hojo, Sakhi, and Chopstick see him and realize with joy that he is alive. Chiang recovers his memory after seeing Sidhu and Sakhi together and is reunited with his daughter. He trains Sidhu in kung fu so he can go up against Hojo. Hojo lies to Suzy that Chiang killed her real father; she stabs Chiang in retaliation but realizes that Hojo lied to her when she sees her twin, Sakhi. She then betrays Hojo and returns to her family. Sidhu fights Hojo in single combat, eventually using his own vegetable-cutting technique to overpower him and finally kill him.

In the aftermath, Sidhu opens a vegetable stand in China and is recruited to help African Pygmies. (Note: The end credits of the film teased a sequel titled Chandni Chowk to Africa, however it never got materialized due to poor box-office performance of first part.)

== Cast ==
- Akshay Kumar as Sidhesh "Sidhu" Sharma / Liu Sheng (dual role)
- Deepika Padukone as Sakhi / Miss TSM and Suzy / Meow Meow (dual Role)
- Ranvir Shorey as Chopstick
- Mithun Chakraborty as Dada / Mr. Sharma (extended appearance)
- Roger Yuan as Police Inspector Chiang Kohung Bhikari Baba (Beggar Baba ) (Old Beggar) (Old Beggar Baba)
- Gordon Liu as Hojo
- Kiran Juneja as Chiang's wife Mrs Kohung
- Conan Stevens as Joey

== Production ==
The film was earlier titled Mera Naam Chin Chin Choo alongside Made in China before the current title was finalised.

Filming began in January 2008 in China. It became the first Indian film to be shot at The Great Wall of China and Forbidden City. In addition to being shot in China, parts of the film were shot in Bangkok and Ratchaburi in Thailand. Although some of the sequences set in China were also filmed in sets at the Shanghai Film Studio. Filming also took place in Delhi's Chandni Chowk, Agrasen Ki Baoli and Paranthe Wali Gali.

== Music ==
Chandni Chowk to China

Soundtrack album by Shankar–Ehsaan–Loy, Bappi Lahiri, Bappa Lahiri, Kailasa, Kailash Kher, Paresh, Naresh and Bohemia
- Released: 4 December 2008
- Recorded: 2008
- Genre: Feature film soundtrack
- Length: 37:43
- Label: T-Series
- Producer: Shankar–Ehsaan–Loy

Shankar–Ehsaan–Loy chronology
Konchem Istam Konchem Kastam (2008)	Chandni Chowk to China (2008)	Luck by Chance (2008)

Bappi Lahiri chronology
Jaane Bhi Do Yaaron (2007)	Chandni Chowk to China (2008)	My Love (2009)

Kailasa chronology
Dasvidaniya (2008)	Chandni Chowk to China (2008)	Chaandan Mein (2009)

Bohemia chronology
Chandni Chowk to China (2008)

The music of Chandni Chowk to China was released on 4 December 2008. The album was composed by Shankar–Ehsaan–Loy, Kailash Kher, Paresh-Naresh, Bappi Lahiri, Bappa Lahiri and Bohemia.

Track-List
No.	Title	Lyrics	Music	Singer(s)	Length
1.	"S.I.D.H.U"	Kailash Kher	Kailasa	Kailash Kher	5:04
2.	"Chandni Chowk To China"	Rajat Arora	Shankar–Ehsaan–Loy	Neeraj Shridhar, Anushka Manchanda, Shankar Mahadevan	4:26
3.	"India Se Aaya Tera Dost (Aap Ki Khatir)"	Rajat Arora, Shaily Shailendra	Bappi Lahiri	Bappi Lahiri, Ravi K Tripathi	6:29
4.	"Tera Naina"	Rajat Arora	Shankar–Ehsaan–Loy	Shankar Mahadevan, Shreya Ghoshal	4:18
5.	"Chak Lein De"	Kailash Kher	Kailash Kher, Naresh, Paresh	Kailash Kher	4:25
6.	"Chandni Chowk To China (CC2C)"	Bohemia	Bohemia	Bohemia, Akshay Kumar, Aastha Gill	3:44
7.	"Chandni Chowk To China" (Remix)	Rajat Arora	Shankar–Ehsaan–Loy	Dj A-Myth	4:41
8.	"Chak Lein De" (Remix)	Kailash Kher	Kailash Kher, Naresh, Paresh	Dj A-Myth	4:36
Total length:					37:43

=== Reception ===
Joginder Tuteja of Bollywood Hungama gave 3.5/5 stars, claiming, "Chandni Chowk to China is clearly the next musical hit in the making."

== Release ==
=== Box office ===
Chandni Chowk to China earned ₹330 million (US$3.4 million) in its opening weekend. It went on to earn a total of ₹407 million (US$4.2 million) in India. The film's total North American box office in the four weeks of running was $921,738, and total worldwide gross was $13,439,480.

=== Critical reception ===
The film received negative reviews from critics. On the review aggregator website Rotten Tomatoes, 42% of 59 critics' reviews are positive, with an average rating of 5.2/10. The website's consensus reads: "A thin plot is disguised by high octane dancing and action in this Bollywood crossover comedy." Metacritic, which uses a weighted average, assigned the film a score of 44 out of 100, based on 22 critics, indicating "mixed or average" reviews. Claudia Puig of USA Today said, "This Indian/Chinese cinematic hybrid is likable and entertaining but overlong and occasionally hokey", and that Kumar's "physical humor brings to mind Jim Carrey". John Anderson of Variety wrote, "If Chandni Chowk to China were a person, it would need Valium", and found that "everything is fast and furious, hilarious, hysterical and frantic. Some of the sequences as are quite beautiful and, in the case of the dance numbers featuring Padukone, stunning. But it's the fight scenes as that truly take off". Frank Lovece of Newsday wrote, "Less a Bollywood bonbon than a pan-Asian fusion dish, this combination of Indian musical and Chinese chopsocky is, nonetheless, delicious fun".

Steven Rae of The Philadelphia Inquirer stated that, "Chandni Chowk is entertainingly goofy for about 30 minutes. And then, for the next two hours-plus, it's agony." Scott Tobias of The Onion described the film as "crass, schizophrenic, culturally insensitive, horribly paced, and shameless in its pandering to the lowest common denominator", while Owen Gleiberman of Entertainment Weekly said, "This galumphing elephant of a chopsocky revenge-of-the-nerd quasi-musical lacks the lyrical choreographic beauty that has marked such Stateside Bollywood releases as the gorgeous Lagaan". Michael Philips of the Chicago Tribune called the film "a massive and rather tiring showcase for Bollywood action hero Akshay Kumar". Indian critic Taran Adarsh gave the movie 1.5/5 stars, calling it "a big, big, big letdown". Rajeev Masand of IBN termed it a tiring watch, while praising Kumar's performance.

The film has received one award nomination, with Deepika Padukone being nominated for Best Actress at the 3rd Asian Film Awards held in March 2009.

== Controversy ==
In Nepal, there were protests against the film due to a passing claim that Buddha was born in India; Lumbini, which is the birthplace of Buddha, is located in Nepal.

Several shows were cancelled in Nepal due to the protests. Protestors threatened to burn cinemas that screened the film, and racial slurs like "Dhoti" were hurled against Indians online.

The protests continued for several days, despite the Nepali distributor deleting the piece of narration that mentioned Buddha in the copies of the film shown in Nepal. On 22 January, Nepali cinemas stopped and banned screening Chandni Chowk to China.

In the aftermath of the Nepal controversy, actor Shekhar Suman criticised the film with some derogatory and rude comments. He also stated the movie is an amateurish attempt by Nikhil Advani, terming it as a "worst" film. Mostly, supporters of Kumar, especially Nikhil Advani stated that it was a publicity stunt to bring Suman's son Adhyayan in limelight for release of his film Raaz: The Mystery Continues. Suman replied to the claim that it was not a publicity act and the latter apologized to Kumar for it.
