= Love Sex Aur Dhokha (soundtrack) =

Soundtrack album by Sneha Khanwalkar
- Released: 26 February 2010
- Recorded: 2009–2010
- Genre: Feature film soundtrack
- Length: 29:58
- Language: Hindi
- Label: Sony Music India
- Producer: Sneha Khanwalkar

Sneha Khanwalkar chronology
| Oye Lucky! Lucky Oye! (2008) | Love Sex Aur Dhokha (2010) | Bheja Fry 2 (2011) |

Love Sex Aur Dhokha is the soundtrack album composed by Sneha Khanwalkar to the 2010 Hindi-language anthology found footage drama film of the same name directed by Dibakar Banerjee. The film's soundtrack featured eight songs with lyrics written by Banerjee himself and released through Sony Music India label on 26 February 2010.

== Development ==
For the film's soundtrack and score, Banerjee chose musician Sneha Khanwalkar, whom he had previously worked with on Oye Lucky! Lucky Oye! (2008) as he wanted "a groovy yet rakish" sound. Before the script was ready, Banerjee gave Khanwalkar a lyric sheet with four lines "tasveer utaarunga, mele mein dikhaunga, jo dekhega usski ankhiyan nachwaunga" (transl. I will take a picture, I will show it at the fair, and whoever sees it will have their eyes dancing with delight.) which she felt that she have not heard anything like that which was "weird, violent yet somewhat interesting".

Khanwalker then worked on composing the tune based on the lyrics, and came up with the titular track which had a gibberish sounding and an unconventional tribute to yesteryear songs of R. D. Burman presented in corny Hinglish wordings, with her finding the appropriate sound for the mood. The film required a "dark psychopathic" music and Banerjee used lyrics sparsely in order to titilate the audience, finding that it was tricky, the way how songs had integrated into it. As a result, most of the songs are around in a 2–3 minute runtime. For the longer songs, Khanwalkar integrated it with screams and gunshots.

The song "I Can't Hold It" has a blend of Rajasthani folk music with dhoklas playing in the background. The soundtrack had accompanied a mix of Indian classical music, soft rock, folk, retro and every other genres, which was a culmination of the ideas that she and Banerjee shared back and forth. A variety of instrumentation has been employed in most of the tracks. The song "Mohabbat Bollywood Style" is a tribute to the Jatin–Lalit style of film music, when Khanwalkar had grown up listening, and had mandolin incorporated in particular music. As Banerjee wanted some mood music, she composed in a 1990s style, which audience would relate to. It was sung by reality show contenstants, Nihira Joshi and Amey Date. The track "Tu Gandi" featured controversial and ironic lyrics, in contrast to the serious tone of the film.

== Reception ==
Harmeet Singh of The Indian Express called the album a "pure delight" with a "rustic-club feel to it". Karthik Srinivasan of Milliblog called it an "attitude-loaded soundtrack with one standout song". Vipin Nair of Music Aloud wrote "LSD’s soundtrack is surely no Dev.D, and is definitely a notch lower that Sneha Khanwalkar’s score for OLLO, but is impressive nevertheless for its variety and originality." Joginder Tuteja of Bollywood Hungama wrote "Love Sex Aur Dhokha is no great shakes with the graph only sliding down with every passing song [... but], the title track rocks and that is the only (and a major) reason why one would want to pick this album up". Raja Sen of Rediff.com wrote "the film's music is married to the narrative with a casual grace, right from the DDLJ theme to the film's own deceptively simple theme tune, one that goes with anything".

== Track listing ==
All lyrics are written by Dibakar Banerjee.

| No. | Title | Singer(s) | Length |
|---|---|---|---|
| 1. | "I Can't Hold It" | Sneha Khanwalkar | 2:49 |
| 2. | "LSD Remix" | Kailash Kher, Mikey McCleary, Nagarjuna | 3:31 |
| 3. | "LSD Title Track" | Kailash Kher | 4:54 |
| 4. | "Mohabbat Bollywood Style" | Nihira Joshi, Amey Date | 3:50 |
| 5. | "Na Batati Tu" | Kailash Kher | 5:17 |
| 6. | "Tainu TV Per Wekhya" | Kailash Kher | 2:53 |
| 7. | "Tauba Tauba (Remix)" | Kailash Kher | 3:35 |
| 8. | "Tu Gandi" | Kailash Kher, Paresh Kamath, Naresh Kamath | 3:09 |
| Total length: | | | 29:58 |

== Awards and nominations ==
| Award | Date of ceremony (Note: Date is linked to the article about the awards held that year, wherever possible.) | Category | Recipients | Result | Ref. |
|---|---|---|---|---|---|
| Filmfare Awards | 29 January 2011 | R. D. Burman Music Award | Sneha Khanwalkar | Won | |
