= Chalo Koi Baat Nahi =

Indian 2021 web-comedy show

- Genre: Comedy
- Created by: Gursimran Khamba & Amit Tandon
- Written by: Amit Tandon; Rohan Desai; Manuj Chawla; Gurleen Pannu; Mohammad Anas; Gursimran Khamba
- Directed by: Sukriti Tyagi
- Starring: Vinay Pathak; Ranvir Shorey; Kavita Kaushik; Vibha Chibber
- Country of origin: India
- Original language: Hindi
- No. of seasons: 1
- No. of episodes: 6

Production
- Producer: Indranil Chakraborty

Original release
- Network: SonyLIV
- Release: 20 August 2021

Chalo Koi Baat Nahi is a 2021 Indian Hindi language sketch comedy show which has been released on SonyLIV. This show was directed by Sukriti Tyagi and produced by Indranil Chakraborty. It has been created by stand-up comedians, Gursimran Khamba and Amit Tandon with the writing team of Manuj Chawla, Md Anas, Rohan Desai and Gurleen Pannu. The duo of Vinay Pathak and Ranvir Shorey unite as the show's presenters.

The show was officially released on SonyLIV on 20 August 2021.

== Cast ==
- Vinay Pathak (host)
- Ranvir Shorey (host)
- Kavita Kaushik
- Karan Wahi
- Vibha Chibber
- Suresh Menon
- Atul Khatri
- Abish Mathew
- Amit Tandon
- Kriti Vij
- Ankush Bahuguna

== Episodes ==
Chalo Ko Baat Nahin is a 6 episode fictional sketch comedy show and all 6 episodes focus on a specific pillar of modern India like Media, Sports, Education, Hospitals, Environment, and Railways. Combining stand-up comedy and sketches in the show, it gives hilarious insight into why we all handle problems with the age-old saying, 'Chalo Koi Baat Nahi'.
