= Anuradha Menon =

Indian actress

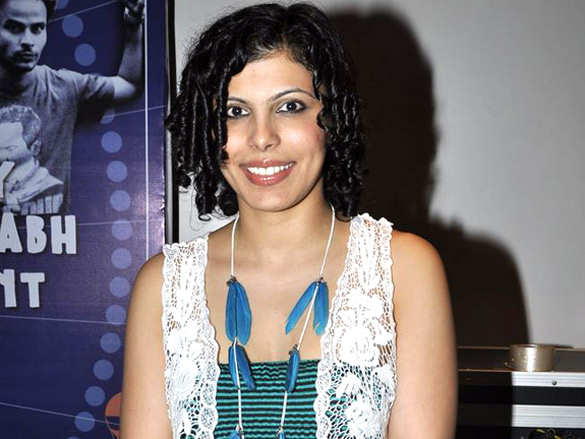
- Born: India, Pondicherry
- Occupations: Actress; Voice Actress
- Years active: 1987-present

Anuradha Menon, also known as Anu Menon, is an Indian actress and theatre artist. Lola Kutty, the popular Channel [V] VJ, is her alter ego.

== Acting career ==
Originally from Kerala, Anuradha Menon grew up in Chennai. Her parents Mini and Mohan Menon worked in the advertising industry. Anuradha Menon started taking part in theatre productions in school. She was associated with The Madras Players for some years. In 2000, she played Shubra in Madras Players' Lizard Waltz (written by Chetan Shah and directed by Bhagirathi Narayanan). She also studied theatre at a school in London for one year, East 15 Acting School. Then, she moved to Mumbai as it was the hub of English theatre in India.

It was in Mumbai that she got her break into Indian theatre. She acted as a governess in Divya Palat's "The Verdict." In this she was required to act with a heavy Malayali accent and this is what landed her the "Lola Kutty" role in Television. In 2004, while auditioning for a producer, she was spotted by VJ Gaurav of Channel [V]. Gaurav immediately recommended her to Channel [V], where she became popular as "Lola Kutty".

After she became famous as Lola Kutty, Anuradha Menon also got some film offers, but she considers theatre as her priority. She has performed in many notable plays including Zen Katha and Sammy! (both directed by Lillete Dubey). In the two-act award-winning play Sammy!, she played an ensemble of roles, including Sarojini Naidu. In Only Women (directed by Deesh Mariwala), she played a nurse called Jasmine. The play deals with Jasmine's impending engagement and how it affects her swings in moods, one of which leads to fatal error in the profession, and how things are sorted out.

Apart from film roles in Quick Gun Murugun and Happy New Year in the character of Lola Kutty, she has acted in films such as Raat Gayi, Baat Gayi? and Amit Sahni Ki List.

== Stand-Up ==
Anuradha Menon, otherwise known as Anu Menon, has donned the stand-up comedian's hat after Lola Kutty. She has popularly opened for Brad Sherwood and Colin Mochrie while they were on their India Tour. Her stand-up special Wonder Menon released in 2019 on Amazon Prime Video. She also featured in Vir Das's Amazon Prime Video series Jestination Unknown as herself.

== Lola Kutty ==
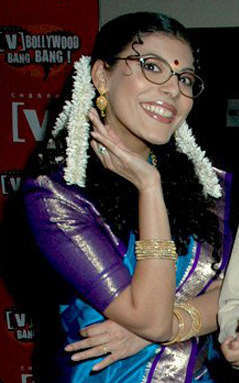
Anuradha Menon as Lola Kutty.

Lola Kutty is a VJ on Channel[V]. Described as "the Channel [V] resident beauty on duty", she is actually an alter ego of Anuradha Menon. Anuradha Menon appears in many of her public dealings as Lola Kutty. When invited for an interview with Pooja Bedi on zOOm with Mona Singh (Jassi of Jassi Jaissi Koi Nahin), she appeared as "Lola Kutty", unlike Mona Singh (who appeared as her off-screen self).

Lola Kutty is a bespectacled Keralite lady who speaks English with a heavy Malayali accent. Unlike other VJs, she has curly oily hair sporting a gajra and wears silk saris. Unlike Jassi of Jassi Jaissi Koi Nahin, Lola has no plans for a makeover. She is a huge fan of Abhishek Bachchan. Her assistant is Shiny Alex, who wears fluorescent shirts, matching slippers, and mundu folded up.

In her show Celebrity Forum/Lola TV, Lola Kutty plays interviewer to celebrities esp. Bollywood personalities. Lola's shows don't involve vulgar, corny or spicy humor; rather, they rely on witty asides and straight-faced questions for humor.

In 2006, a Limited Edition Deluxe Official 2006 Notebook Chronicle of Lola— the VJ, the Woman and the Wisecrack was released. The Notebook features various facets of Lola—modelling her "LolaWay products", giving gyaan (knowledge) and discussing movies. The first edition received a very good response. Lola Kutty has also worked as agony aunt for The Record Music Magazine.

Lola Kutty boosted Channel [V]'s TRP ratings considerably. Apart from India, she has a fan following among Indian diaspora in the Middle East and the UK.

In real life (i.e. aside from her Lola Kutty alter ego), she speaks English with a tinge of UK accent. She is fluent in her mother-tongue, Malayalam, as well.

=== Awards and nominations ===
Lola TV won three Golds and one Silver at the PROMAX & BDA India Awards

- Gold - Best comedy Promo (Lola TV)
- Gold - Funniest Spot (Lola TV)
- Gold - Best On-Air Branding (Lola - Matchbox ID/Lola TV/Lola Kutty)
- Silver - Best Entertainment Promo (Lola TV Promo)

At The Indian Telly Awards 2006, Lola Kutty was nominated for "Best Anchor Award - Talk Show" for Lola T[v].

Lola Kutty also appeared in the 2009 movie Quick Gun Murugun as the Locket Girl, and in the 2014 film Happy New Year as a television reporter.

=== Criticism ===
Lola's character was criticized by some for being offensive to Malayali people. However, in an interview, Anuradha Menon asserted that "Lola is funny as a person, not as a region".
