= Raat Gayi, Baat Gayi? =

Raat Gayi Baat Gayi?
- Theatrical release poster
- Directed by: Saurabh Shukla
- Written by: Rajat Kapoor; Saurabh Shukla (story)
- Produced by: Rajat Kapoor; Pritish Nandy; Rangita Pritish Nandy
- Starring: Rajat Kapoor; Neha Dhupia; Vinay Pathak; Iravati Harshe
- Cinematography: Fuwad Khan
- Edited by: Sankalp Meshram
- Music by: Ankur Tiwari
- Production company: Pritish Nandy Communications
- Distributed by: Percept Picture Company
- Release date: 31 December 2009
- Country: India
- Language: Hindi

Raat Gayi, Baat Gayi? is a 2009 Indian Hindi-language comedy drama film written and directed by Saurabh Shukla. The film features Rajat Kapoor, Vinay Pathak, Neha Dhupia, Iravati Harshe and Anu Menon in leading roles.

== Plot ==
Raat Gayi, Baat Gayi? is a film about three couples and a keen observation on modern day marriage. Rahul (Rajat Kapoor) wakes up with a bad hangover after a party the night before. There he had met a sexy young woman - Sophia (Neha Dhupia). They got drunk and there were sparks flying. But Rahul doesn't remember what happened after that. Did they go all the way? His wife, Mitali (Iravati Harshe), is in a particularly bad mood this morning, and Rahul suspects that she might know about his little escapade last night. Rahul starts chasing his night—trying to retrieve it—trying to find out what really happened. His friends Saxena (Dalip Tahil) and Amit (Vinay Pathak) are going through their own marital crises of sorts. Driven to his wit's end, he realizes he must seek Sophia out to restore his sanity

== Cast ==
- Rajat Kapoor as Rahul Kapoor
- Vinay Pathak as Amit
- Dalip Tahil as Jaswinder 'Jas' Saxena
- Iravati Harshe as Mitali R. Kapoor (credited as Irawati Harshe Mayadev)
- Anu Menon as Nandini 'Nandi'
- Navneet Nishan as Jolly J. Saxena (credited as Navniit Nisshan)
- Ranvir Shorey as Gagandeep 'Gags' Singh
- Aamir Bashir as Prasad
- Makrand Deshpande as Party Guest (credited as Makarand Deshpande)
- Sudhir Mishra as Archana's dad
- Neha Dhupia as Archana / Sophia
- Anil Chaudhary
- Masoom Gandhi as Komal 'Chutka' R. Kapoor
- Brijendra Kala (credited as Kala Briendra) as Vinod Nagpal, estate agent
- Shikha Markana
- Tarini Mishra
- Vivek Vaswani as Dr. Patkar

== Soundtrack ==
The music of the film is composed by Ankur Tiwari. It consisted of 7 songs and 3 remixes. The music was released on T-Series. Lyrics were penned by Ankur Tiwari.

=== Track listing ===
No.	Title	Performer(s)	Length
1.	"Bade Shehar Ke Bade Nakhre"	Anushka Manchanda	2:23
2.	"Bade Shehar Ke Bade Nakhre" (Jazz)	Anushka Manchanda	2:23
3.	"Don'T Flay Love"	Siddharath Coutto	3:13
4.	"Kyon"	Ankur Tiwari	5:36
5.	"Love In C Major"	Ankur Tiwari, Siddharath Coutto	3:06
6.	"Love In C Major" (Remix)	Ankur Tiwari, Siddharath Coutto	3:29
7.	"Mohabbat"	Ankur Tiwari	3:23
8.	"Raat Gayi Baat Gayi"	Ankur Tiwari, Anushka Manchanda	2:29
9.	"Raat Gayi Baat Gayi" (Remix)	Ankur Tiwari, Anushka Manchanda	3:03
10.	"Yaari"	Ankur Tiwari	4:40

== Reception ==
The movie opened to mixed to negative reviews from critics. Taran Adarsh of Bollywood Hungama rated the film with one and half stars out of five saying, "In a nutshell, RAAT GAYI, BAAT GAYI? offers a few laughs, not laughter unlimited!"

Rajeev Masand of CNN-IBN gave the film two stars out of five and stated, "Raat Gayi Baat Gayi has the ingredients for a movie one would probably enjoy very much, but somehow they never come together."

Anupama Chopra of NDTV gave two and a half stars and commented, "This could have been a fun take on urban marriage but the script, by Rajat Kapoor and Saurabh Shukla, is absolute lead."

Nikhat Kazmi of the Times of India awarded three stars saying, "the film does augur for interesting viewing, providing an opportunity for a roll call of the entire current art house ensemble cast."

== Awards and nominations ==
=== 2009 New York South Asian International Film Festival ===
Won

- Best Film - Saurabh Shukla and Rajat Kapoor

=== 2010 Star Screen Awards ===
Nominated

- Best Supporting Actress - Neha Dhupia
- Best Comedian - Vinay Pathak
