= Be-Reham =

- Directed by: Raghunath Jhalani
- Story by: K. D. Shorey
- Produced by: K. D. Shorey
- Starring: Sanjeev Kumar; Mala Sinha; Shatrughan Sinha; Reena Roy
- Music by: Laxmikant–Pyarelal
- Release date: 15 August 1980
- Country: India
- Language: Hindi

Be-Reham is a 1980 Indian Hindi-language film directed by Raghunath Jhalani and produced by K. D. Shorey. The film features Sanjeev Kumar, Mala Sinha, Shatrughan Sinha and Reena Roy in lead roles and music by Laxmikant-Pyarelal. This film was remade as Thiruppam in Tamil and Chattaniki Veyi Kallu in Telugu with Krishna in a double role.

== Premise ==
Kumar Anand, an honest police officer, gets into trouble after he accidentally kills a gangster at his ex-lover Maya's house.

== Cast ==
- Sanjeev Kumar as Police Commissioner Kumar Anand
- Mala Sinha as Maya / Devki Bai
- Shatrughan Sinha as Inspector Chandramohan Sharma "Chandar"
- Reena Roy as Journalist Kiran
- I. S. Johar as Inspector Malpani
- Kader Khan as P.K.
- Viju Khote as Tiger
- Keshto Mukherjee as Ram Prasad
- Manmohan as Ghanshyam
- Urmila Bhatt as Chandramohan's Mother
- Raj Mehra as Police Commissioner Kulkarni
- Dev Kumar as Police Commissioner Gupte
- Moushumi Chatterjee as Hameeda Banu Bhopali (Special Appearance)
- Helen as P. K.'s Client (Special Appearance)
- M. B. Shetty as Shetty
- Gurbachan Singh as Daku Vikram Singh

== Soundtrack ==
Lyrics: Verma Malik

Song	Singer
"Haseenon Ki Duniya"	Lata Mangeshkar
"Ek Lafz-E-Mohabbat Ka"	Asha Bhosle
"Milne Ko Aate Ho"	Asha Bhosle
"Hum Aaj Yeh Qissa Khatm Karen, Ya Husn Rahe, Ya Ishq Rahe"	Asha Bhosle, Mahendra Kapoor
"Taqdeer Ke Kalam Se"	Mohammed Rafi
"Yeh Saal Ki Aakhri Raat Hai, Zara Samajhnewali Baat Hai"	Shailendra Singh, Anuradha Paudwal, Chandrani Mukherjee

== Legacy ==
This film was remade as Thiruppam in Tamil and Chattaniki Veyi Kallu in Telugu with Krishna in a dual role.
