= Vinay Pathak =

Indian film actor (born 1968)

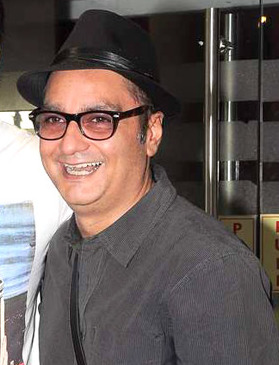
- Pathak at the audio release of Maximum in 2012
- Born: 27 July 1968 (age 58); Arrah, Bihar, India
- Education: Allahabad University (BA); Stony Brook University (BFA)
- Occupations: Actor; television presenter; film producer
- Years active: 1996–present
- Spouse: Sonika Sahay (m. 2006)
- Children: 2

Vinay Pathak (born 27 July 1968) is an Indian theater and film actor. He has starred in many films including Khosla Ka Ghosla, Bheja Fry, Island City and Johnny Gaddaar and had a supporting role in movies like Jism, Rab Ne Bana Di Jodi and My Name Is Khan.

== Early life ==
Pathak was born on 27 July 1968 in Bhojpur district, Bihar, India. He spent his early childhood in Dhanbad as his father was posted in the police department there. He attended the boarding school Vikas Vidyalaya, Ranchi until 1982. After graduating from Allahabad University, he moved to the United States for higher studies. Perhaps chief among his mentors in his BFA program Stony Brook University was Farley Richmond, who also urged him to return to India and Hindi theater and film in 1995.

== Career ==
While studying at State University of New York at Stony Brook Pathak had many acting roles(i.e. Silence the Court is in Session directed by Farley Richmond and starring Vinay Pathak, Vincent Daly, Gerry Cosgrove, Alison Steele, John Roque, Jacqueline Macario, Simon, and Dmitri). In 1999, he played the role of Vinny in the television series Hip Hip Hurray. He also produced the film Dasvidaniya, which told the story of a common man bidding farewell before dying.

Along with good friend Ranvir Shorey, he anchored the show OYE. Together they hosted the talk show Ranvir Vinay Aur Kaun?., as well as House Arrest, Duniya Goal Hain and Cricket Crazy. He also teamed up with his friends Ranvir, Suresh Menon, and Gaurav Gera to be a part of a gag-based show The Great Indian Comedy Show.

Pathak starred in a minor role as Inspector Gurpal Badash in a made-for-TV movie Murder Unveiled (2005), featuring the Sikh community in Canada.

Pathak acted in the movies Johnny Gaddaar, Aaja Nachle, Khoya Khoya Chand and Rab Ne Bana Di Jodi.

His next film produced by Pritish Nandy Communications Raat Gayi Baat Gayi, was released in India in December 2009.

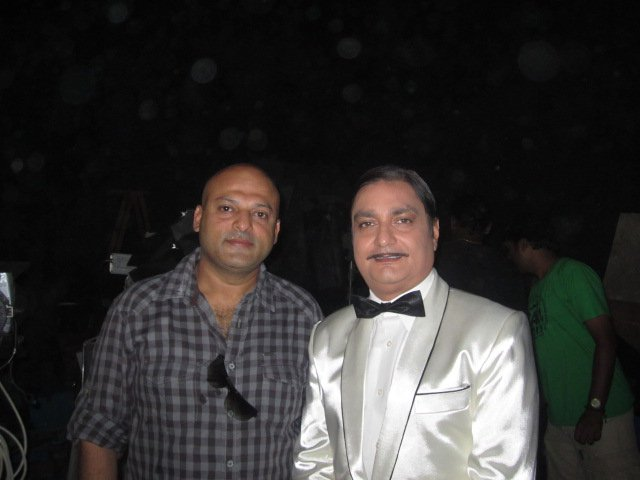
Vinay Pathak with Deepak Bhanushali on ONCE MORE STUDIOS location

He was in the film Antardwand.

== Personal life ==
Vinay Pathak is married to Sonika Sahay. The couple have two daughters Vasudha and Sharinee.

== Filmography ==
Key
†	Denotes films that have not yet been released

=== Television ===
Year	Title	Role	Language	Notes
1997	Margarita		Hindi	
1998	House Arrest	Host/presenter	English	
1998–2001	Hip Hip Hurray	Vincent "Vinnie" George	Hindi	
2001	Kahani Poori Filmi Hai	Host/presenter	Hindi	
2002	Kyun Hota Hai Pyarrr	Professor	Hindi	
2004–2007	The Great Indian Comedy Show	Various characters	Hindi	
2005	Murder Unveiled	Inspector Gurpal Badas	English	Canadian television film
2007	Ranvir Vinay Aur Kaun?	Host/presenter	Hindi	
2010	Kaam Ka Plot	Inspector	Hindi	Television film
2013	CID	Mintoo Hasan	Hindi	Bajatey Raho Special episode
2013–2014	Har Ghar Kuch Kehta Hai	Host/presenter	Hindi	
2019	Made in Heaven	Ramesh Gupta	Hindi	
2020	Special OPS	Abbas Sheikh	Hindi	
2020	A Suitable Boy	L.N. Agarwal	Hindi	
2021	Special Ops 1.5: The Himmat Story	Abbas Sheikh	Hindi	
2021	Chalo Koi Baat Nahi	Host/presenter	Hindi	
2022	Khakee: The Bihar Chapter	Sri Ujjiyaar Prasad	Hindi	
2023	Sultan of Delhi	Jagan Seth	Hindi	
2023	P I Meena	Dr.Basu	Hindi	
2024	Life Hill Gayi	Himaylay	Hindi	
2025	Gram Chikitsalay	Chetak Kumar	Hindi	
2025	Special OPS 2	Abbas Sheikh	Hindi	
2026	Operation Safed Sagar	Nawaz Sharif	Hindi	

=== Films ===
Year	Film	Role	Language	Notes
1996	Fire	Guide At Taj Mahal	Hindi/English	Indo-Canadian co-production
1998	Bombay Boys	Chaiwalla	English	
1999	Hum Dil De Chuke Sanam	Tarun	Hindi	
2000	Har Dil Jo Pyar Karega	Monty	Hindi	
2003	Jism	DCP Siddharth	Hindi	
2006	Khosla Ka Ghosla	Asif Iqbal	Hindi	
2006	Mixed Doubles	Vinay	Hindi	
2007	Johnny Gaddaar	Prakash	Hindi	
2007	Aaja Nachle	Mr. Chojar	Hindi	
2007	Bheja Fry	Bharat Bhushan	Hindi	Won - Producers Guild Film Award for Best Actor in a Comic Role Nominated - IIFA Award for Best Performance in a Comic Role
2007	Say Salaam India	Mr. Chopra	Hindi	
2008	Oh, My God	Rajendra Dubey	Hindi	
2008	Dasvidaniya	Amar Kaul	Hindi	Also Producer
2008	Rab Ne Bana Di Jodi	Balwinder "Bobby" Khosla	Hindi	Nominated - Filmfare Award for Best Supporting Actor Nominated - IIFA Award for Best Supporting Actor
2008	Via Darjeeling	Inspector Robin Dutt	Hindi	
2008	Mithya	Ram Bhai	Hindi	
2008	Manorama Six Feet Under	Sub-Inspector Brij Mohan	Hindi	
2009	Raat Gayi Baat Gayi	Amit	Hindi	
2009	Quick Gun Murugun	Chitragupta	English	
2009	Straight	Mr. Peenu Patel	Hindi	
2010	Antardwand	Madhukar Shahi	Hindi	
2010	The Film Emotional Atyachar	Joe	Hindi	
2010	My Name is Khan	Jitesh	English	
2011	Pappu Can't Dance Saala	Vidyadhar Acharya	Hindi	
2011	Tere Mere Phere	Jai Dhumal	Hindi	
2011	Bheja Fry 2	Bharat Bhushan	Hindi	
2011	Jo Dooba So Paar	Havaldar Tokan	Hindi	
2011	Utt Pataang	Ram Sharma / Lucky Sardana	Hindi	
2011	Chalo Dilli	Mannu Gupta	Hindi	
2011	Ek Tho Chance		Hindi	Special appearance
2012	Midnight's Children	Hardy	English	Canadian-British film
2012	Fatso!		Hindi	
2012	Maximum	Tiwari	Hindi	
2013	Bajatey Raho	Mintoo Hasan	Hindi	
2015	Gour Hari Dastaan	Gour Hari Das	Hindi	
2015	Kaagaz Ke Fools	Purshottam Tripathi	Hindi	
2015	Island City		Hindi	
2015	Chidiya	Bali	Hindi	
2015	Badlapur	Harman	Hindi	
2016	Motu Patlu: King Of Kings	Guddu Ghalib	Hindi	Voice role
2017	Dark Brew	Anil Vadera	Hindi	
2017	Hanuman Da' Damdaar	Popat Sharma	Hindi	Voice role Animated film
2018	Khajoor Pe Atke	Ravinder	Hindi	
2018	Toba Tek Singh	Saadat Hasan Manto	Hindi	Released on ZEE5
2018	Yours Truly		Hindi	Released on ZEE5.
2019	Chintu Ka Birthday	Madan Tiwary	Hindi	Released on ZEE5
2019	Ramprasad Ki Tehrvi	Pankaj Bhargava	Hindi	
2019	Chappad Phaad Ke	Sharad Atmaram Gupchup	Hindi	
2019	Axone	Landlord	Hindi	
2019	Mitin Mashi	BENGALI	Hindi	
2019	Dhuusar (Grey)	Supt. Avinash Gautam	Bengali, Hindi	
2019	The Tashkent Files	Mukhtar	Hindi	
2019	Luka Chuppi	Trivedi Ji	Hindi	
2023	Blind	Prithvi Khanna	Hindi	
2023	Bhagwan Bharose	Nanababu	Hindi	
2023	The Archies	H. Dawson	Hindi	Netflix film
2024	Merry Christmas	Inspector Paresh Kamdar	Hindi	
2024	Aliya Basu Gayab Hai	Vikram	Hindi	
2025	Phule	Govindrao Phule	Hindi	
2025	Mannu Kya Karegga	D.O.N	Hindi	
2026	Everybody Loves Sohrab Handa	Sohrab Handa	Hindi	ZEE5 stream

=== Producer ===
Year	Title	Director	Notes
2008	Dasvidaniya	Shashant Shah	
