= Bad Aur Badnam =

- LP Vinyl Records Cover
- Directed by: Feroze Chinoy
- Written by: K.D.Shorey
- Produced by: K.D.Shorey
- Starring: Sanjeev Kumar; Shatrughan Sinha; Parveen Babi; Anita Raj
- Music by: Laxmikant–Pyarelal
- Release date: 1 January 1984
- Running time: 135 minutes
- Country: India
- Language: Hindi

Bad Aur Badnam is a 1984 Indian Hindi-language film directed by Feroze Chinoy for producer K. D. Shorey who has also written the story, starring Sanjeev Kumar, Shatrughan Sinha, Parveen Babi, Anita Raj and the music was composed by Laxmikant-Pyarelal.

== Plot ==
The story commences with three wrongdoers acquiring a substantial sum of money and receiving new identities courtesy of the affluent individual Pedro, who, in return, meets his demise. Subsequently, we encounter two covert agents, James (portrayed by Sanjeev Kumar) representing Ringania and Ashwinikumar (played by Shatrughan Sinha) from the Indian Intelligence Bureau, both operating at the pinnacle of their skills. Due to a misunderstanding, they find themselves as sworn adversaries; nonetheless, their official responsibilities persist. Ashwinikumar delves into an enigmatic scheme to assassinate a prominent figure in New Delhi, while James embarks on a Ringanian mission within India. They engage in a confrontation, briefly reconcile, and the remainder of the movie follows their collaborative endeavors to decipher the mystery and thwart the malevolent conspiracy.

== Cast ==
- Sanjeev Kumar as James Carlo
- Shatrughan Sinha as Ashwini Kumar
- Parveen Babi as Pamela Singh
- Anita Raj as Dr. Anita Mathur
- I. S. Johar as Malpani
- Kader Khan as John / Marco
- Jagdeep as Mishra
- Raj Mehra as Mahendra Pratap "M. P."
- Shreeram Lagoo as R.C. Dutta
- Pinchoo Kapoor

== Music ==
All songs are written by Anand Bakshi.

Song	Singer
"Bemurabbat Bekadar Bewafa"	Lata Mangeshkar
"Hamen Tumse Mohabbat Hai"	Asha Bhosle
"Khalo Peelo Hanslo, Dilwalon Mauj Karlo"	Lata Mangeshkar, Shabbir Kumar
"Humse Muqabla Karoge To Tum Haar Jaoge, Hum Jeet Jayenge"	Lata Mangeshkar, Suresh Wadkar
"Yahi Hai Dosti To Dost Bhi Kya Jarurat Hai"	Anuradha Paudwal, Shabbir Kumar, Suresh Wadkar
"Is Zindagi Ka Talabgar Main Nahin, Ae Maut Thahar Ja"	Shailendra Singh, Suresh Wadkar
