= K.D. Shorey =

Indian film producer, actor, and director

- Born: February 3, 1930; Jalandhar
- Died: September 16, 2022 (aged 92); Mumbai, India
- Occupation(s): Film producer, actor, and director
- Spouse: Rajeshwari Shorey
- Children: 3 sons, including Ranvir Shorey

Krishan Dev Shorey (3 February 1930 – 16 September 2022), known professionally as K.D. Shorey, was an Indian film producer, actor, and director who was active in the Hindi film industry during the 1970s, 1980s, and 1990s. He was known for producing films such as Zinda Dil (1975), Be-Reham (1980), and Bad Aur Badnaam (1984), and for directing Maha-Yuddh (1998). Shorey also held significant roles in industry organisations, including general secretary of the Film Federation of India, the Film Makers' Combine and the president of the Indian Motion Picture Producers' Association (IMPPA). He was a key advocate in securing official industry status for the film business.

== Early life ==
K.D. Shorey was born on 3 February 1930 in Jalandhar, India and faced financial hardships, as noted by his son, actor Ranvir Shorey, who described him as having "survived poverty, Bollywood, and cancer."

== Career ==
Shorey began his film career as a producer with Umar Qaid (1975), a multi-starrer featuring Vinod Khanna and Jeetendra, followed by Zinda Dil (1975), which starred Rishi Kapoor and Neetu Singh.

His production company, KDS Films, backed several projects in the 1980s, including Be-Reham (1980), starring Sanjeev Kumar and Shatrughan Sinha, and Bad Aur Badnaam (1984).

In 1998, Shorey directed Maha-Yuddh, a film featuring Gulshan Grover, Kader Khan, Mukesh Khanna, and his elder son, Lokesh Shorey, in his acting debut. While the film included notable actors, it did not achieve significant commercial success.

Shorey also made uncredited cameo appearances in some of his films, often as a judge.

Beyond filmmaking, Shorey was actively involved in industry governance, serving as general secretary of the Film Makers' Combine and on the executive committee of IMPPA for several years.

He served as an active member of the Film Federation of India, notably holding the position of general secretary. He played a significant role in advocating for the recognition of the film business as an official industry, contributing to efforts that led to its formal acknowledgment as such.

== Personal life ==
Ranvir described him as his "greatest source of inspiration and protection," noting his resilience in overcoming personal and professional hardships. Shorey's later years were marked by health struggles, including a battle with cancer.

== Death ==
K.D. Shorey died on 16 September 2022, at the age of 92 in Mumbai, India, surrounded by his children and grandchildren.

His death was widely reported, with tributes from industry figures like Kubbra Sait, Gajraj Rao, and Kay Kay Menon, reflecting his lasting impact.

His chautha (memorial ceremony) was held on 19 September 2022, at Maheshwari Bhavan in Andheri West, Mumbai.

== Filmography ==
- Umar Qaid (1975) – Producer
- Zinda Dil (1975) – Producer, Actor (uncredited, as Judge)
- Be-Reham (1980) – Producer
- Bad Aur Badnaam (1984) – Producer
- Maha-Yuddh (1998) – Director, Producer
