= Ranvir Shorey =

Indian actor

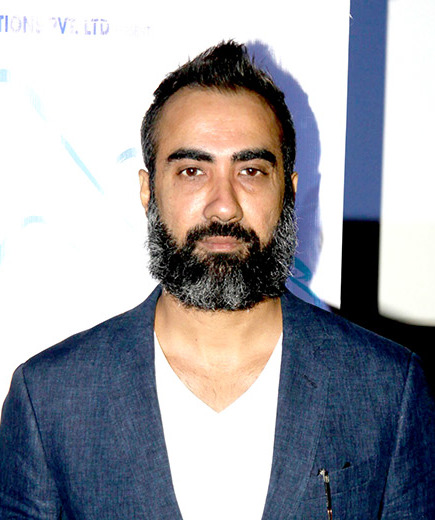
- Shorey in 2015
- Born: 18 August 1972 (age 54); Jalandhar, Punjab, India
- Occupations: actor; former video jockey
- Years active: 1998–present
- Spouse: Konkona Sen Sharma (m. 2010; div. 2020)
- Children: 1
- Father: K.D. Shorey

Ranvir Shorey (born 18 August 1972) is an Indian actor and former video jockey. Since making his debut in Ek Chhotisi Love Story (2002), he has worked in both mainstream and independent cinema. His commercially successful films include Jism (2003), Lakshya (2004), Honeymoon Travels Pvt. Ltd. (2007), Singh Is Kinng (2008), Ek Tha Tiger (2012), Angrezi Medium (2020), and Tiger 3 (2023). He has also starred in critically acclaimed films such as Khosla Ka Ghosla (2006), Traffic Signal and Bheja Fry (both 2007), Mithya (2008), Titli (2014), and A Death in the Gunj (2016). He was nominated for the Filmfare Award for Best Supporting Actor for Sonchiriya (2019).

Subsequently, he hosted Jhalak Dikhhla Jaa 7 (2015) and Chalo Koi Baat Nahi (2021). He has also appeared in digital series such as Rangbaaz (2018), Sacred Games (2018–2019), High and Hasmukh (both 2020), Metro Park and Tabbar (both 2021), and Sunflower (2021–present). In 2024, he participated in the reality show Bigg Boss OTT 3 and finished as the second runner-up.

== Early and personal life ==
He was born to Bollywood producer Krishan Dev Shorey on 18 August 1972 in Jalandhar, Punjab. He has a brother named Lokesh Shorey. Ranvir Shorey did his early schooling from Dayanand Model Sr. Secondary School, Jalandhar. Shorey is a close friend of actor and director Rajat Kapoor and actor Vinay Pathak.

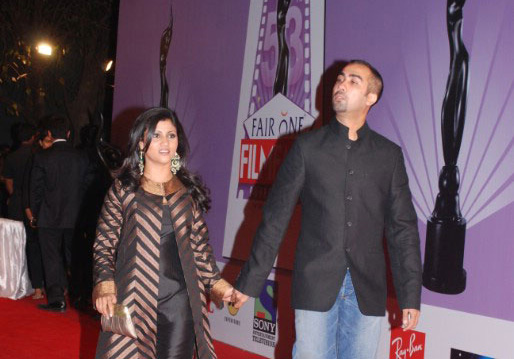
Shorey with his ex-wife Konkona Sen Sharma at the 53rd Annual Filmfare Awards.

Ranvir Shorey dated Pooja Bhatt. He married his longtime girlfriend actress Konkona Sen Sharma on 3 September 2010. The couple got engaged in 2008 in an intimate ceremony at their Goregaon residence. The couple had son Haroon Shorey on 15 March 2011 at a South Mumbai hospital. The couple later separated after five years of marriage. They still continue to remain friends and share the custody of their son.

== Career ==
He started his career along with his friend and co-actor Vinay Pathak. He was the host of the successful talk show Ranvir Vinay Aur Kaun? and The Great Indian Comedy Show which aired on STAR One.

He made his debut opposite Manisha Koirala in the film Ek Chhotisi Love Story (2002). His next film Jism (2003) was a hit but he had a minor role. It was not until 2006 that he got noticed in the comedy Khosla Ka Ghosla. The film was released to much acclaim and his comic role was praised. He played Nanoo in the comedy Pyaar Ke Side Effects alongside Rahul Bose as his funny friend. He appeared in the multi-starrer Honeymoon Travels Pvt. Ltd. (2007) which was moderately successful. He appeared in a Yash Raj Films, titled Aaja Nachle which was released in November 2007. Mithya, which was released in February 2008, has Ranvir Shorey as the lead actor and has been critically acclaimed. In 2008, Ranvir was seen in movies like Ugly Aur Pagli and box office hit Singh Is Kinng.

He hosted Jhalak Dikhhla Jaa season 7 in 2014, which aired on Colors (TV channel).

In 2018, he starred in the short film Shame alongside Swara Bhaskar. He also appeared in the 2019 film Sonchiriya alongside Sushant Singh Rajput, Ashutosh Rana and Manoj Bajpayee.

Ranvir Shorey starrer Kadakh is a dark comedy which caught attention of the audience.

Shorey was a contestant on the reality TV show, Bigg Boss OTT Season 3. The series streamed on JioCinema Premium. He entered the show on June 21, 2024.

== Filmography ==
=== Films ===
| Year | Title | Role | Notes |
|---|---|---|---|
| 1999 | Samne Yeh Kaun | | Short |
| 2002 | Ek Chotisi Love Story | Manisha's boyfriend | |
| 2003 | Jism | Vishal | |
| 2003 | Freaky Chakra | The Writer | English film |
| 2003 | Waisa Bhi Hota Hai Part II | Ranveer Shourie | |
| 2004 | Lakshya | Tarsem Singh | |
| 2005 | Hum Dum | Anthony | |
| 2005 | The Film | Director Kaushik | |
| 2006 | Shiva | Daksh | |
| 2006 | Mixed Doubles | Sunil Arora | |
| 2006 | Yun Hota Toh Kya Hota | Sports Bar Manager | |
| 2006 | Pyaar Ke Side Effects | Nanoo (Narayanan Balgopal Swami Iyer) | |
| 2006 | Khosla Ka Ghosla | Balwant K. 'Bunty' Khosla | |
| 2007 | Traffic Signal | Dominic D'Souza | |
| 2007 | Honeymoon Travels Pvt. Ltd. | Hitesh | |
| 2007 | Bheja Fry | Asif Merchant | |
| 2007 | No Smoking | Abbas Tyerwalla | |
| 2007 | Aaja Nachle | Mohan Sharma | |
| 2008 | Mithya | VK/Raje Bhai | |
| 2008 | Sirf | Akash | |
| 2008 | Ugly Aur Pagli | Kabir | |
| 2008 | Good Luck | A Jiglo | |
| 2008 | Singh Is Kinng | Puneet Sabarwal | |
| 2008 | 8 | Arif | Segment: "How can it be?" |
| 2008 | Dasvidaniya | Jagtap | |
| 2008 | Fashion | Himself | Cameo |
| 2009 | Chandni Chowk to China | Chop Stick | |
| 2009 | Quick Gun Murugan | Sansani Reporter | Cameo |
| 2009 | Thanks Maa | M. C. Motwani | |
| 2009 | Do Knot Disturb | A detective | |
| 2009 | Raat Gayi, Baat Gayi? | Gagandeep 'Gags' Singh | |
| 2010 | Aap Ke Liye Hum | | |
| 2010 | The Film Emotional Atyachar | Leslie | |
| 2010 | I M 24 | Gagandeep Singh | |
| 2010 | Iti Mrinalini | Mahinder | |
| 2012 | Life Ki Toh Lag Gayi | Amol Ganguly | |
| 2012 | Fatso! | Sudeep | |
| 2012 | Ek Tha Tiger | Gopi Arya | |
| 2012 | Heroine | Tapanda | |
| 2012 | Midnight's Children | Laurel | Canadian-British film |
| 2013 | Bombay Talkies | Vicky's father | |
| 2013 | Bajatey Raho | Ballu | |
| 2013 | Ankhon Dekhi | Tourist photographer | Uncredited cameo |
| 2014 | Happy Ending | Montu | |
| 2015 | Gour Hari Dastaan | Rajiv Singhal | |
| 2015 | Titli | Vikram | |
| 2016 | Moh Maya Money | Aman | |
| 2017 | Blue Mountains | Om Mehra | |
| 2017 | A Death In The Gunj | Vikram | |
| 2017 | Gali Guliyan | Ganeshi | |
| 2017 | Kadvi Hawa | Banker | |
| 2018 | Halkaa | Ramesh | |
| 2018 | Manto | Ishar Singh | |
| 2019 | Sonchiriya | Vakeel Singh | |
| 2019 | Tennis Buddies | Mr. Singh | |
| 2019 | Shame | Sumer Seth | Short |
| 2020 | Angrezi Medium | Balashankar Tripathi / Bablu | |
| 2020 | Kadakh | Sunil | |
| 2020 | Lootcase | Inspector Kolte | |
| 2021 | 420 IPC | Savak Jamshedji | |
| 2021 | Murder at Teesri Manzil 302 | Abhishek Deewan | |
| 2022 | RK/RKay | KN Singh / Ranvir | |
| 2023 | Mumbaikar | PKP (Prabal Kant Patil) | |
| 2023 | Tiger 3 | Gopi Arya | |
| 2023 | Everybody Loves Sohrab Handa | Madhvan | |
| 2024 | Accident or Conspiracy: Godhra | Mahmood Qureshi | |
| 2024 | The Signature | | |
| 2025 | Jassi Weds Jassi | Sehgal | |
| 2025 | Champion | Hashim | Telugu film |

=== Television ===
| Year | Title | Role | Notes |
|---|---|---|---|
| 1998 | Oye | Host | English language show |
| 1998 | House Arrest | Host | English language show |
| 1999 | Saba | Host | English language show |
| 2000 | Chat Room | Host | English language show |
| 2004–2007 | The Great Indian Comedy Show | Various Characters | |
| 2007 | Ranvir Vinay Aur Kaun? | Host | |
| 2010 | Kaam Ka Plot | Dashrath Srivastava | TV film |
| 2012 | Savdhaan India | Host | |
| 2014 | Fear Factor: Khatron Ke Khiladi 5 | Contestant | Reality show |
| 2014 | Jhalak Dikhhla Jaa 7 | Host | Reality show |
| 2018 | Rangbaaz | Siddharth Pandey | |
| 2019 | Sacred Games | Shahid Khan | |
| 2019–2021 | Metro Park | Kalpesh Patel | |
| 2019 | Bombers | Debu | |
| 2019 | The Office | Prem Chopra | |
| 2019 | Flip | Raghu | episode "Bully" |
| 2020 | High | Jackson Lakda | |
| 2020 | Hasmukh | Jimmy the Maker | |
| 2020 | PariWar | Shishupal Narayan | |
| 2020 | A Suitable Boy | Waris | |
| 2020 | Metro Park: Quarantine Edition | Kalpesh Patel | |
| 2021–2024 | Sunflower | Inspector S. Digendra | ZEE5 series |
| 2021 | Tabbar | Ajeet Sodhi | |
| 2021 | Chalo Koi Baat Nahi | Host | |
| 2024 | Bigg Boss OTT 3 | Contestant | Reality show |
| 2024 | Shekhar Home | Jayavrat Sahni | |
| 2025 | Kanneda | Ranjit bajwa | |
| 2025 | Bindiya Ke Bahubali | Chhota Davan | |
| 2026 | The Pyramid Scheme | Manoj Shrivastav | |

== Awards and nominations ==
| Year | Award | Category | Nominated work | Result | Ref. |
|---|---|---|---|---|---|
| 2016 | IBNLive Movie Awards | Best Supporting Actor | Titli | Nominated | |
| 2019 | FOI Online Awards | Best Supporting Actor | Sonchiriya | Won | |
| 2019 | IReel Awards | Best Actor (Comedy) | Metro Park | Nominated | |
| 2019 | Gold Awards | Best Performance by an Actor in a Comic Role | Metro Park | Won | |
| 2020 | Filmfare Awards | Best Supporting Actor | Sonchiriya | Nominated | |
| 2021 | Asian Television Awards | Best Supporting Actor | Sunflower | Won | |
