= Dhadkane Azad Hain =

- Cover of "Dhadkane Azad Hain" featuring Shreya Ghoshal

Single by Shreya Ghoshal

from the album Dhadkane Azad Hain
- Released: 10 July 2017
- Recorded: 4 April 2017
- Genre: Indian pop; Hindustani classical
- Length: 4:10
- Composer(s): Deepak Pandit
- Lyricist(s): Manoj Muntashir
- Producer(s): Shreya Ghoshal

Shreya Ghoshal singles chronology
"Tere Bina" (2018)	"Dhadkane Azad Hain" (2017)	""Nah Woh Main"" (2020)

Music video
- "Dhadkane Azad Hain" on YouTube

Dhadkane Azad Hain is the first ever Hindustani Classic independent single produced by Shreya Ghoshal. The Song is Composed by Deepak Pandit and Lyrics have been penned by Manoj Muntashir.

== Development ==
The singer always wanted to make independent music that does not have the boundaries or restrictions that a movie has so she geared up for the Single.

== Shooting ==
The music video features Shreya Ghoshal herself in the valley of Manali, Himachal Pradesh directed by Parasher Baruah.

== Release ==
The official teaser of the Single was released on 2 July 2017 on the official YouTube of Shreya Ghoshal. The full video song was released on 10 July 2017 on the same. It frequently gained the attention of public and counted 140k views on the second day.

== Personnel ==
As listed by the official YouTube channel of Shreya Ghoshal.

- Music Composer and Arranger - Deepak Pandit
- Lyrics - Manoj Muntashir
- Song Programming and Guitars - Sanjay Jaipurewale
- Tabla and Dholak - Heera Pandit
- Esraj- Arshad Khan
- Live Strings - Bombay String Section
- Song Recording and Mixing Engineer - K. Sethuraman at Keerthana Studio
- Vocals Recorder - Amey Londhe, Audio Garage Studio
- Mastering Engineer - Christian Wright at Abbey Road Studio, London
