= Kailasa Chaandan Mein =

Chaandan Mein

Studio album by Kailasa
- Released: June 2009
- Recorded: Kailasa Studios, Mumbai, India
- Genres: Fusion, Sufi
- Length: 58:15
- Label: Sony Music

Kailasa chronology
Chandni Chowk to China (2008)	Chaandan Mein (2009)	Rangeele (2011)

Kailasa Chaandan Mein is the third studio album by Indian fusion band Kailasa, released in June 2009 by Sony Music.

== Track listing ==
All songs written by Kailash Kher and music by Kailash Kher, Paresh Kamath & Naresh Kamath.

No.	Title	Length
1.	"Chaandan Mein"	5:56
2.	"Na Batati Hu (Na Dhin Dhin Dhin Na)"	5:17
3.	"Teri Yaad Mein"	6:33
4.	"Bheeg Gaya Mera Mann (Cherrapunjee)"	7:14
5.	"Ishq Ho Gaya"	5:41
6.	"Piya Ghar Aavenge"	5:42
7.	"Rang Rang Ma"	4:00
8.	"Kar Kar Main Haara"	6:35
9.	"Albela Saajan" (Bonus Track)	4:47
10.	"Tere Naina" (Bonus Track)	6:30

== Personnel ==
- Paresh Kamath – Guitars, Keyboards, Backing Vocals
- Naresh Kamath – Bass, Keyboards, Backing Vocals
- Kurt Peters – Drums, Percussions
- Sanket Athale – Percussions, Vocal Percussions, Backing Vocals
- Sankarshan Kini – Violin, Mandolin

=== Additional musicians ===
- Rinku Rajput – Keyboards
- Tapas Roy – Rabab, Saz, Mandolin, Oud, Santoor
- Sunil Das – Sitar
- Feroze Shah – Harmonium
- Kutle Khan – Mor Chang, Bagal Bacchha, Kartal
- Naveen Kumar – Flutes
- Ashwin Srinivasan – Flutes
- Kawa Brass Band – Brass section
