= Quick Gun Murugun =

2009 Indian English-language action western film

- Theatrical release poster
- Directed by: Shashanka Ghosh
- Written by: Rajesh Devraj
- Based on: Characters by: Shashanka Ghosh; Rajesh Devraj
- Produced by: Phat Phish Motion Pictures
- Starring: Rajendra Prasad; Nassar; Rambha; Anuradha Menon
- Cinematography: R. A. Krishna
- Edited by: Rabiranjan Maitra
- Music by: Songs: Sagar Desai; Raghu Dixit; Background Score: Daniel B. George
- Production companies: Fox Star Studios; Phat Phish Motion Pictures
- Release date: 28 August 2009
- Running time: 97 minutes
- Country: India
- Language: English
- Budget: ₹ 60 million
- Box office: ₹ 25.7 million

Quick Gun Murugun: Misadventures of an Indian Cowboy is a 2009 Indian English-language comedy Western film directed by Shashanka Ghosh and written by Rajesh Devraj. The film stars Rajendra Prasad as the title character alongside Nassar, Rambha and Anuradha Menon. It is a spoof on Indian western films, featuring songs, melodrama and action sequences including a duel in a traffic jam.

The character of Murugun was created in 1994 and was featured in India's Channel V promos. The film was released in 2009. Quick Gun Murugun has been exhibited at the London Film Festival, the Indian Film Festival of Los Angeles, the New York Asian Film Festival and in The Museum of Modern Art, New York City (MoMa). The film also has some Tamil dialogues and Hindi songs. The film was dubbed in several languages, including Hindi, Tamil, and Telugu.

== Plot ==
Quick Gun Murugun is an unlikely superhero, a Tamil cowboy whose duty is to protect the world against arch villain restaurant owner Rice Plate Reddy, who wants to create the ultimate non-vegetarian dosa. The film revolves around the adventures of Murugun along with his love-to-be Mango Dolly and Locket Lover. Murugun is a typical vegetarian cowboy who made himself into Quick Gun Murugan. He has to do something good for the world, so he believes that vegetarianism is the need of the hour. Murugun enters into a battle that spans time and space, from a small south Indian village to Heaven and then finally to cosmopolitan Mumbai across 25 years. He is torn between Mango Dolly, who loves him secretly, and his first love Locket Lover. His loyalty is put to the test. Mango Dolly gets hit by a bullet. While dying, she expresses her love to Murugun. Realizing that he too loves Mango Dolly, he tells her that he too loves her and that she can "stay with him". Finally, Murugun is able to succeed in his mission by defeating Rice Plate Reddy.

== Cast ==
- Rajendra Prasad as Quick Gun Murugun
  - The character of Murugun was created in 1994 and was featured in India's Channel V India promos. Around 1998, the film version was in the works. In the 2007 Hindi film Om Shanti Om, Shah Rukh Khan films a scene as Murugun, trying to trick his love interest into believing he is a star of Tamil cinema.
- Nassar as Rice Plate Reddy
- Rambha as Mango Dolly
- Anuradha Menon as Locket Lover
- Raju Sundaram as Rowdy MBA
- Shanmugarajan as Gun Powder
- Vinay Pathak as Chitragupta
- Ashwin Mushran as Dr. Django
- Balasubramanian as S. G. Murugan
- Kishori Ballal as Mrs. S. G. Murugan
- Sandhya Mridul as TV Host
- Ranvir Shorey in a guest appearance
- Gaurav Kapoor in a guest appearance
- Robin Gurung in a guest appearance as a cameraman

== Soundtrack ==
Quick Gun Murugun

Soundtrack album by Sagar Desai & Raghu Dixit
- Released: 3 July 2009
- Genre: Feature film soundtrack
- Label: Sony Music India
- Producer: Sagar Desai & Raghu Dixit, Deep & DJ Chandu

Professional ratings
Review scores
| Source | Rating |
|---|---|
| Rediff | 3/5 stars |

Track listing
| No. | Title | Lyrics | Music | Singers | Length |
|---|---|---|---|---|---|
| 1. | "Dialogue Mix" | Ankur Tewari | Sagar Desai | Film Artists | 4:14 |
| 2. | "Murugun Superstar" | Raghu Dixit | Raghu Dixit | Raghu Dixit, Bharat 'Barry' Krishna & Ranina Reddy | 2:52 |
| 3. | "Mind It" (Tamil Bhangra) | Ankur Tewari | Sagar Desai | Mika Singh | 4:07 |
| 4. | "Kyoon Keeda Hai Aapko?" | Ankur Tewari | Sagar Desai | Vijay Prakash | 4:10 |
| 5. | "Ek Tha Murugun" | Shellee | Sagar Desai | Vijay Prakash | 4:48 |
| 6. | "Chat Mangni Lover" | Ankur Tewari | Sagar Desai | Vijay Prakash | 3:48 |
| 7. | "Kuchi Kuchi Twist" | Ankur Tewari | Sagar Desai | Vijay Prakash & Hamsika Iyer | 3:22 |
| 8. | "Naam Mera Mango Dolly" | | Sagar Desai | Geeta John | 3:40 |
| 9. | "Space Goddess" (Chat Mangni Remix^{*}) | Ankur Tewari | Sagar Desai | Vijay Prakash & Pratichee Mohapatra | 4:01 |
| 10. | "Mind It" (Club Mix^{*}) | Ankur Tewari, MC Bobkat | Sagar Desai | Mika & Mc Bobkat | 3:34 |
| 11. | "Aunties On The Dance Floor" (Chat Mangni Remix^{*}) | Ankur Tewari | Sagar Desai | Vijay Prakash | 3:29 |
| 12. | "Ragamuffin Mix^{*}" | Ankur Tewari, MC BobKat, Rahul Sout Dandy Squad | Sagar Desai | Vijay Prakash, Hamsika Iyer, Mc Bobkat & Sout Dandy Squad | 3:26 |

^{*}remixed by Deep & DJ Chandu

== Reception ==
Chandrima Pal of Rediff.com gave 3.5 out of 5, saying, "From his two-minute life span on a music channel, Quick Gun Murugan has come a long way indeed and deserves this full-length feature dedicated to our very own Indian Cowboy with a buckle to die for (Stylists, may I please have a replica of the same?!). On the whole, QGM is as delicious as Mrs Murugan's dosais. As Rice Plate would have said, "A1, Tip Top!" Taran Adarsh of Bollywood Hungama gave this film 3/5 rating and described it as "Quick Gun Murugan is an innovative experience. The adventures should appeal to the youth mainly." Rajeev Masand gave it a 3 out of 5 and said:, "Good spoofs are hard to come by, but director Shashanka Ghosh's Quick Gun Murugun is a rare exception" Mayank Shekhar of Hindustan Times said, "This one is so much funnier as a whole. Go for it, I say!' and gave 3 out of 5 stars."

== Other media ==
A mobile video game based on the film was also released by Indiagames.
