= Kailasa (album) =

Studio album by Kailasa
- Released: 2006
- Recorded: Blue Studios
- Genre: Fusion, Sufi
- Length: 0:39:09
- Label: Sony BMG

Kailasa chronology
Kailasa (2006)	Jhoomo Re (2007)

Kailasa is the debut album of the Indian Sufi/Fusion band Kailasa, led by Kailash Kher. The album was released in the year 2006 in India.

== Songs ==
Kailasa consists of 9 songs. Track no. 8 is a remix of the song 'Tauba Tauba'. The last track 'Allah Ke Bande' is mentioned as live on the track list but it is actually a version recording of song of the same name from the movie 'Waisa Bhi Hota Hai Part II'. The opening track 'Teri Deewani' is a love song mixing themes of love and devotion. 'Jana Jogi De Naal', is a Sufi/folk song. Its lyrics are taken from separate works of Kabirdas and Bulle Shah. Similarly 'Naiharwa' is a traditional song written by Kabirdas.

== Album art ==
The album art is designed by 'Mangoblossom Design' and depicts Kailash Kher as a sage. The back of the CD and vinyl album artwork show all three members of the band.

== Track listing ==
No.	Title	Lyrics	Music	Length
1.	"Teri Deewani"	Kailash Kher	Kailash Kher; Paresh Kamath; Naresh Kamath	5:23
2.	"Tauba Tauba"	Kailash Kher	Kailash Kher; Paresh Kamath; Naresh Kamath	3:53
3.	"Dilruba"	Kailash Kher	Kailash Kher; Paresh Kamath; Naresh Kamath	4:00
4.	"Jana Jogi De Naal"	Bulle Shah; Kabirdas	Kailash Kher; Paresh Kamath; Naresh Kamath	4:18
5.	"Kaise Main Kahoon"	Kailash Kher	Kailash Kher; Paresh Kamath; Naresh Kamath	4:18
6.	"Naiharwa"	Kabirdas	Kailash Kher; Paresh Kamath; Naresh Kamath	4:36
7.	"Albela Sajan"	Kailash Kher	Kailash Kher; Paresh Kamath; Naresh Kamath	4:48
8.	"Tauba Tauba (Remix)"	Kailash Kher	Kailash Kher; Paresh Kamath; Naresh Kamath	3:37
9.	"Allah Ke Bande" (live)	Vishal Dadlani	Vishal Dadlani; Shekhar Ravjiani	4:34

== Personnel ==
Kailasa

- Kailash Kher – lead vocals
- Paresh Kamath – lead guitar
- Naresh Kamath – bass, backing vocals
- Kurt Peters – drums on track 9

=== Additional musicians ===
- Ashwin Srinivasan – flutes on tracks 4 & 6
- Ferozbhai – harmonium on track 3
- Yusuf Mohammed – tabla & dholak on tracks 5,7 & 8
- Jitendra Thakur – violin & viola on tracks 2,5 & 9
- Rakesh Pandit – alaap & backing vocals on track 3
- Pradeep Pandit – backing vocals on track 3
