= Rangeele =

Studio album by Kailasa
- Released: 10 January 2012 (India)
- Recorded: Kailasa Studios, Mumbai, India
- Genres: Fusion, Sufi
- Label: Kailasa Records

Kailasa chronology
| Chaandan Mein (2009) | Rangeele (2012) |

Rangeele is the fourth studio album by the Indian fusion/Sufi band Kailasa, released in 2012. The album was launched on 10 January 2012. The track "Dharti Pe Jannat" features Amitabh Bachchan who narrates two lines in the song.

== Track listing ==
All songs written by Kailash Kher and music by Kailash Kher, Paresh Kamath and Naresh Kamath.

| No. | Title | Length |
|---|---|---|
| 1. | "Rangeele" | 5:15 |
| 2. | "Tu Kya Jaane" | 5:09 |
| 3. | "Albeliye" | 4:46 |
| 4. | "Yadaan Teriyan" | 3:54 |
| 5. | "Daaro Na Rang" | 3:28 |
| 6. | "Kathagaan" | 3:55 |
| 7. | "Babbaji" | 5:01 |
| 8. | "Yadaan Teriyan (Acoustic)" | 3:40 |
| 9. | "Hudkan Maan Bitti" | 2:56 |
| 10. | "Dharti Pe Jannat" (featuring Amitabh Bacchan) | 2:07 |
| 11. | "Ujaale Baant Lo" | 5:06 |

== Personnel ==
- Kailash Kher – Vocals
- Kabir Kher – Vocals
- Paresh Kamath – Guitars, Keyboards, Backing Vocals
- Naresh Kamath – Bass, Keyboards, Backing Vocals
- Kurt Peters – Drums, Percussions
- Sanket Athale – Percussions, Vocal Percussions, Backing Vocals
- Sankarshan Kini – Violin, Mandolin

== Additional musicians ==
- Rinku Rajput – Keyboards
- Tapas Roy – Rabab, Saz, Mandolin, Oud, Santoor
- Sunil Das – Sitar
- Feroze Shah – Harmonium
- Kutle Khan – Mor Chang, Bagal Bacchha, Kartal
- Naveen Kumar – Flutes
- Ashwin Srinivasan – Flutes
- Kawa Brass Band – Brass section
