= Jhoomo Re =

Studio album by Kailasa
- Released: May 2007
- Recorded: Blue Studios, Sangeet Studios, Nirvana
- Genre: Fusion, Sufi
- Label: Sony BMG

Kailasa chronology
Kailasa (2006)	Jhoomo Re (2007)	Dasvidaniya (2008)

Jhoomo Re is the second studio album by the Indian Fusion/Sufi band Kailasa, released in 2007.

== Track listing ==
All songs written by Kailash Kher, except track 4 which is written by Amir Khusro. All music composed by Kailash Kher.

No.	Title	Length
1.	"Babam Bam"
2.	"Saiyyan"
3.	"Joban Chhalke"
4.	"Chhap Tilak"
5.	"Tere Naina"
6.	"Jhoomo Re"
7.	"Daulat Shohrat"
8.	"Yaar Sajan"
9.	"Tu Meri Jaan Hai"

== Personnel ==
- Kailash Kher — Vocals
- Paresh Kamath — Guitars, Keyboards, Backing Vocals
- Naresh Kamath — Bass, Keyboards, Backing Vocals
- Kurt Peters — Drums, Percussions
- Rinku Rajput - Keyboards
- Sanket Athale — Percussions, Vocal Percussions, Backing Vocals
- Sankarshan Kini - Violin, Mandolin
- Akhlak Hussain Varsi-[Harmonium]
