= Kailasa (band) =

Indian fusion band

- Origin: Mumbai, India
- Genres: Sufi rock, pop rock, Fusion
- Years active: 2005–present
- Labels: Sony BMG, Sony Music, Kailasa Records
- Members: Kailash Kher; Paresh Kamath; Naresh Kamath; Kurt Peters; Tapas Roy; Jose Neil Gomes; Sankalp Srivastava; Vikram Biswakarma; Manuj Dubey; Jovian Soans; Roosevelt Dsouza; Vinit Patil; Arif Hamid Shaikh; Satish Subramaniam Iyer; Rahul Thakur

Kailasa is an Indian rock band, founded by Kailash Kher. The name of the band is taken from an accented pronunciation of Kailash's own name as well as Mount Kailash, the abode of Hindu God Shiva. Along with guitars, drums and keyboards, the band incorporates classical Indian instruments and sometimes traditional lyrics into their songs to infuse folk and a Sufi hue.

== Band members ==
- Kailash Kher — lead vocals
- Paresh Kamath — lead guitar, keyboards, backing vocals
- Naresh Kamath — bass guitar, keyboards, backing vocals
- Kurt Peters — drums
- Manuj Dubey — Indian & Western percussions, backing vocals
- Jose Neil Gomes – saxophone, violin, acoustic guitar, flute
- Sankalp Srivastava – keyboard
- Tapas Roy / Vikram Biswakarma – mandolin, dulcimer
- Jovian Soans – Audio engineer
- Roosevelt Dsouza / Arif Hamid Shaikh – architectural lighting design, lighting engineer
- Vinit Patil – graphic designer or LED and graphics engineer
- Satish Subramaniam Iyer – manager
- Rahul Thakur - Assistant Band Manager

== Musical style ==
Kailasa's music is a blend of medieval Indian music, Sufi and Western music. Lyrical themes though vary but the most distinct style of Kailash Kher is where he sings as through a female devotee/lover trying to persuade her deity/loved one. Fusion of love, worship and persuasion is inspired by the works of medieval Rajasthani poet Meerabai. Such an influence can be observed in songs 'Teri Deewani' and 'Albela Saajan' from their eponymous debut album. Similar theme can be found in another of their song 'Babam Bam' from the album 'Jhoomo Re' where the singer is persuading Lord Shiva.

Due to the complex nature of musical arrangement in their songs, Kailasa involve artists other than band members in the recording process to play instruments like Harmonium, Dholak, Tabla Sarangi, Iranian Setar, Ravanahatta, Rabab, Saz, Oud, Mandolin, Santoor, Sitar, Mor Chang, Khartal etc. The artists are credited for their work in each of their album.

== Performances ==
The band started off as a trio of Paresh Kamath, Naresh Kamath and Kailash Kher.The Kailasa Band has taken the Indian music to multiple countries like United States of America, England, South Africa, Australia, Mauritius, to name a few, having performed in various venues and music festivals across the world, in a career spanning nearly 2 decades and over 1500 concerts. Some of the venues and festivals that the Kailasa Band have performed includes The Hollywood Bowl in Los Angeles, The Kennedy Center in Washington, the historical Fillmore Center in San Francisco, Royal Festival Hall in London, Symphony Hall in Birmingham, the Santa Monica Pier Music Festival, Stern Grove Music Festival, International Music Festival at Webster Hall, New York. The band has performed in more than 500 cities worldwide including Delhi, Mumbai, Ahmedabad, Singapore, Malaysia, Houston, San Francisco, London and New York.

== Discography ==
- Kailasa (2006)
- Jhoomo Re (2007)
- Chaandan Mein (2009)
- Rangeele (2012)
- Ishq Anokha (2016)

== See also ==
- Avial – Previous band of bass player Naresh Kamath
