= Kailash Kher =

Indian pop rock singer (born 1973)

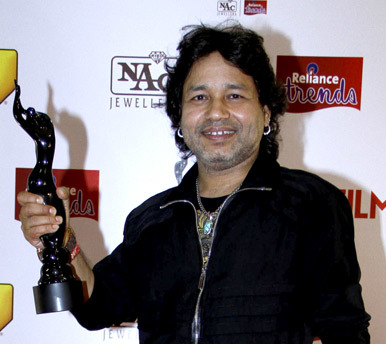
- Kher in 2014

Background information
- Born: 7 July 1973 (age 53); Delhi, India
- Genres: Indian folk; Sufi; Pop rock; Sufi rock; Spiritual
- Occupations: Singer; Composer
- Instruments: Vocals; Harmonium
- Years active: 2003–present
- Label: Soor Mandir
- Spouse: Sheetal Bhan (m. 2009)
- Website: www.kailashkher.com
- Awards: Padma Shri (2017)

Kailash Kher (born 7 July 1973) is an Indian playback singer, live performer, and composer. His music blends Indian folk and Sufi traditions with pop rock and spiritual influences.

== Early life ==
Kher was born into a Kashmiri family on 7 July 1973 in Vinod Nagar, a village in the Mayur Vihar area of East Delhi. His father, Mehar Singh Kher, was a traditional folk singer, and his mother is Chandrakanta Mehar Singh Kher. Kher spent a significant part of his childhood in Meerut, Uttar Pradesh.

Kher's interest in music began at a young age. At age 14, he left home to seek a guru (institution) for classical and folk music training, since he believed that pursuing his passion required isolation. To support his education and living expenses, Kher also taught music to other students. Unable to find a suitable option, Kher continued his learning by listening to music by renowned masters.

Kher worked in a family friend's Indian handicraft export business until it collapsed in 1999. After the setback, he struggled with depression and attempted suicide. He then spent six months in Singapore and Thailand. After returning to New Delhi with his family, he completed his studies at Delhi University via a correspondence program.

== Film career ==
In 2001, Kher moved to Mumbai to pursue singing, living in hostels and working in the music advertising industry to support himself. He was referred to Ram Sampath for a Nakshatra diamonds jingle, providing ₹5,000 (~$57). He recorded jingles for various television and radio commercials, gaining recognition for work with brands like Coca-Cola, Citibank, Pepsi, IPL and Honda Motorcycles.

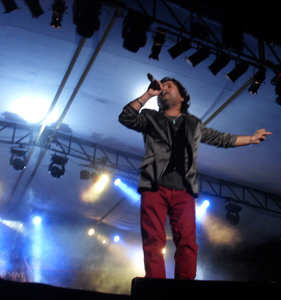
Kher performing in 2012

In 2003, Kher released the song Rabba Ishq Na Hove in the movie Andaaz (2003) after initial efforts in Bollywood. Allah Ke Bande from Waisa Bhi Hota Hai Part II (2003) significantly enhanced his popularity. He sang in Mangal Pandey: The Rising (2005), in which he also had a cameo appearance, and recorded "O Sikander" for Corporate (2006).

In 2006, Kailash Kher released Teri Deewani on his debut album Kailasa, performed by his Sufi fusion band Kailasa. The song was included on the album and has become one of his best‑known tracks.

In 2007, Ya Rabba from Salaam-e-Ishq: A Tribute to Love became widely popular.< In addition, he sang Kaun Hain Voh for Baahubali: The Beginning; and Jay Jaykara and Jal Rahi Hai Chita for Baahubali 2: The Conclusion.

Kher composed music for films including Chandni Chowk to China, Dasvidaniya, Sacred Evil, Sangini, and Desi Kattey. He also penned lyrics for films such as Kaal and Traffic Signal.

He ventured into Kannada cinema with songs such as "Hale Patre" from Junglee and "Ekka Raaja Raani" from Jackie.

He composed and sang the title track of Star Plus's series Diya Aur Baati Hum with Shubha Mudgal, the title track of Colors' series Udaan, as well as the anthem for Swachh Bharat Abhiyan.

== Non-film work ==
=== Kailasa ===
Kher formed the band Kailasa in Mumbai in 2004 with Mumbai-based brothers Paresh Kamath and Naresh Kamath.

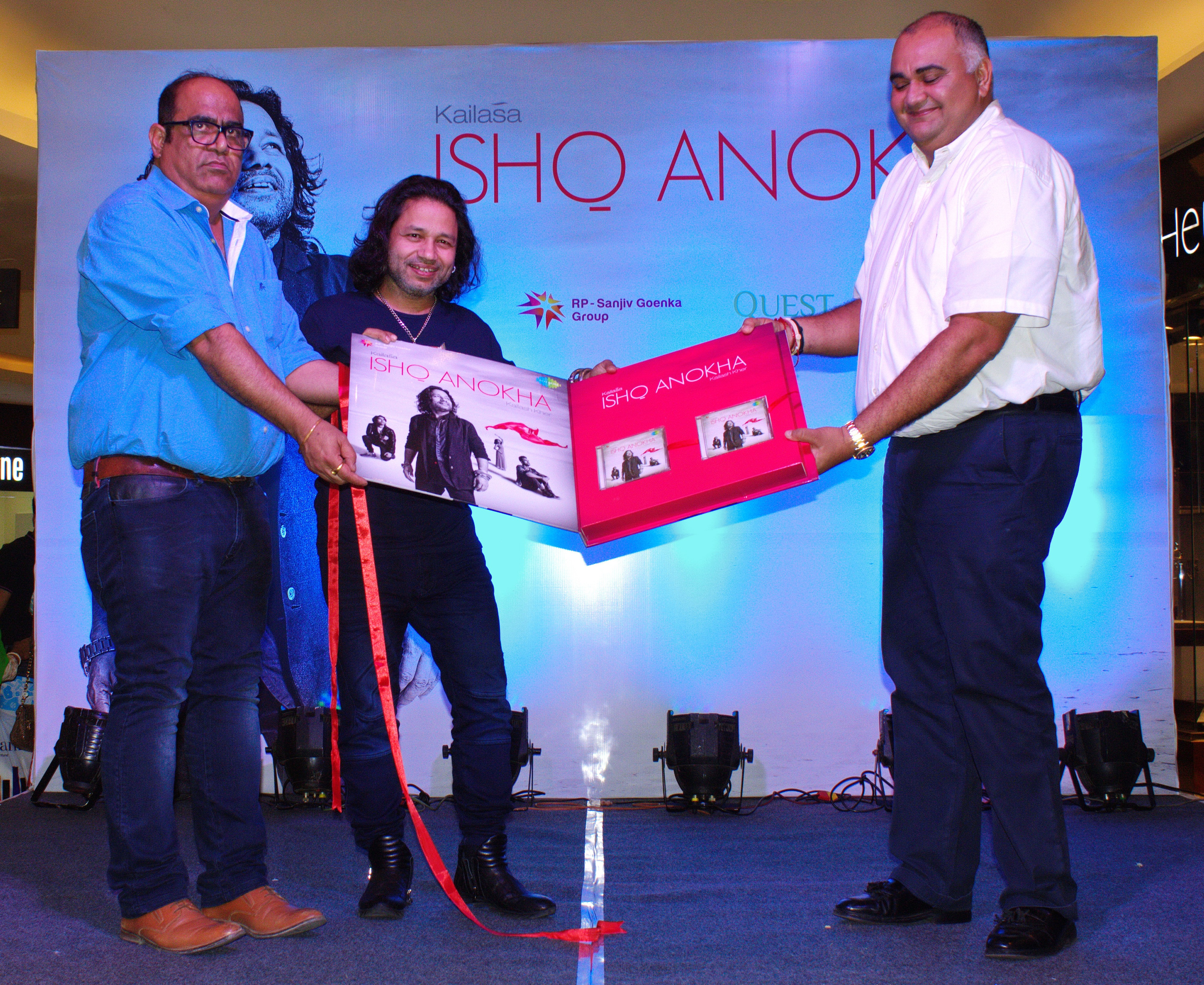
Kher launching his album "Ishq Anokha" in Kolkata, 2016

The band's first album, Kailasa, was released in March 2006. Their second album, Jhoomo Re, was released in May 2007. Kailasa's third album, Chaandan Mein, was released in June 2009. He made his first international album with the independent record label Cumbancha. He released his fourth album, Rangeele, through his company Kailasa Records in January 2012. In 2016, Kher returned with his new album Ishq Anokha.

As part of a recent output of Kailasa, a devotional single "Gajaananaa" was released in August 2025. The song was a musical prompt on the occasion of Ganesh Chaturthi.

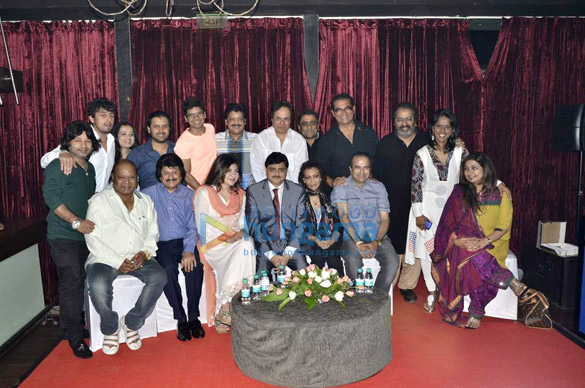
Kher with other Bollywood playback singers

He performed for the Southeast Asian diaspora and for international audiences at festivals and venues such as GlobalFest at New York's Webster Hall, the Kennedy Center (Washington, D.C.), Stern Grove Festival (San Francisco), Celebrate Brooklyn, the Santa Monica Pier Festival (Los Angeles), Fillmore Center (San Francisco), the Hollywood Bowl (Los Angeles), Hammersmith Apollo (London), Symphony Hall (Birmingham), and Massey Hall (Toronto).

In 2007, he joined a North American concert tour titled "The Incredibles," alongside Asha Bhosle, Sonu Nigam, and Kunal Ganjawala. In March 2011, Kailasa performed at the Kennedy Center in Washington, D.C., as part of the Maximum India festival. Kher also performed at the closing ceremony of the 2010 Commonwealth Games in Delhi.

In 2012, as part of Kailasa's third Nepal tour, Kher performed in Dhaka (Bangladesh), Nairobi (Kenya), Zimbabwe, Congo, Karachi (Pakistan), and Muscat (Oman).

In 2024, he sang for the stage production Humare Ram. It was produced by Rahul Bhuchar.

In 2026, he sang at the innings break of the 2026 Indian Premier League final.

=== Television and reality shows ===
Kher has appeared in various television shows, including Wind of Change (Bangladesh) (Gaan Bangla), Sa Re Ga Ma Pa Li'l Champs (Zee TV), Mission Ustaad (9X), Indian Idol 4 (Sony), IPL Rockstar (Colors), and Rock On (MTV). In 2009, he appeared as a judge on Indian Idol 4 alongside Javed Akhtar, Sonali Bendre, and Anu Malik.

In 2013, he collaborated with singer Shreya Ghoshal for the first time on a campaign titled "Project Resound: Upgrade Your Ears," for which he wrote and composed the song "Naina Chaar" and invited Ghoshal to sing. The online initiative by Sony Music India promoted listening awareness and also marketed Sony headphones.

On 15 March 2014, he appeared on the celebrity talk show Comedy Nights with Kapil during Holi celebrations.

Since 2014, he has promoted Indian folk culture through the Kailash Kher Academy (KKALA) and the reality series Bharat Ka Amrit Kalash, showcasing traditional music from across India.

== Artistry ==
Kher's voice has been described as raw, soulful, fresh, high-pitched, and sharp. He mainly sings Ghazal, Sufi, Qawwali, folk, and other devotional songs. His discography frequently features romantic tracks with a touch of classical music, traditional lyrics, and regional languages. By 2014, he had sung in more than 20 Indian languages, including Malayalam, Tamil, Telugu, Kannada, Oriya, Bengali, Sindhi, Bhojpuri, Gujarati, Marathi, Punjabi, Konkani, and Rajasthani, and had recorded over 500 songs for the Hindi film industry and more than 1,000 radio and television jingles.

His influences include musicians such as Gokulotsavji Maharaj, Hridaynath Mangeshkar, Kumar Gandharva, Bhimsen Joshi, Lata Mangeshkar and Nusrat Fateh Ali Khan.

== Media image ==
=== Music for social causes ===
In 2011, Kher composed a song called "Ambar Tak Yehi Naad Goonjega" for the anti-corruption movement led by Anna Hazare, popularly known as the "India Against Corruption Movement." Kher did not charge a professional fee for singing the song.

Kher was featured in the Clean India Mission theme song "Swachh Bharat ka Irada Kar Liya Hum Ne," written by Prasoon Joshi. To promote the Clean India Mission, he visited several places in the prime minister's parliamentary constituency.

Kher appeared in a viral video campaign titled #KyaKisikoPadiHai with Jose Covaco as part of the Swachh Bharat Mission. The campaign was directed by Harnish Ambaliya.

Kher was one of the performers at the community reception held at the SAP Center in San Jose, California, on 27 September 2015. The reception was part of the Prime Minister's initial US tour.

In 2019, Kher sang a song titled "Bol Re Dilli Bol," based on contemporary political events in Delhi; it forms part of the seven‑episode web series "Transparency: Pardarshita", directed by Dr. Munish Kumar Raizada.

=== Sexual harassment allegations ===
In 2018, Kher was accused of inappropriate behaviour and harassment by multiple women during the MeToo movement in India. Kher initially denied the claims, stating that allegations without formal complaints lack authenticity. However, he later issued a public apology for any unintentional behaviour that may have made the complainants uncomfortable.

== Personal life ==
Kher married Sheetal Bhan in February 2009, and they have a son.

== Awards and nominations ==
Kailash Kher awards and nominations
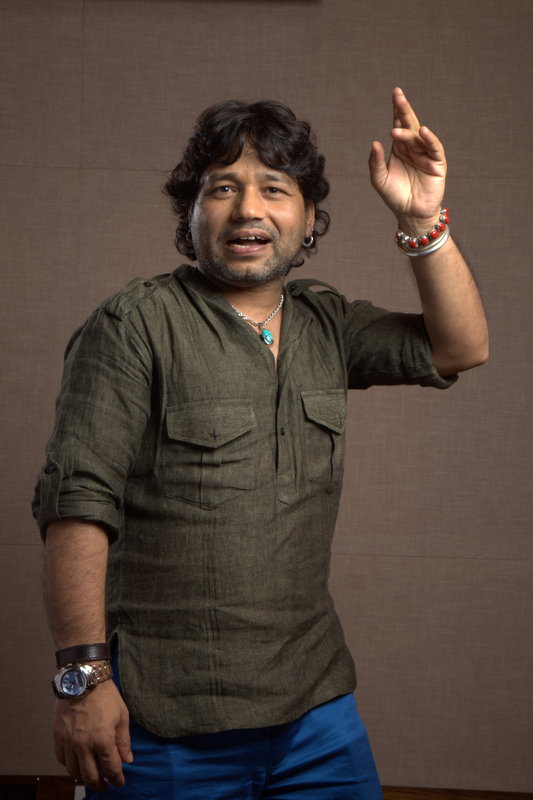
- Kailash Kher
Awards and nominations
Award	Wins	Nominations

Totals (Note: Certain award groups do not simply award one winner. They acknowledge several different recipients, have runners-up, and have third place. Since this is a specific recognition and is different from losing an award, runner-up mentions are considered wins in this award tally. For simplification and to avoid errors, each award in this list has been presumed to have had a prior nomination.)
- Wins: 10
- Nominations: 4

=== Film accolades and other honours ===
Year	Award(s)	Category	Title	Song(s)	Result
2004	Star Screen Awards	Best Male Playback	Waisa Bhi Hota Hai Part 2	"Allah Ke Bande"	Won
2004	Star Guild Awards	Best Male Playback Singer	Waisa Bhi Hota Hai Part 2	"Allah Ke Bande"	Nominated
2007	Filmfare Awards	Best Male Playback Singer	Fanaa	"Chand Sifarish"	Won
2009	Filmfare Awards South	Filmfare Award for Best Male Playback Singer - Telugu	Arundhati	"Kammukunna Cheekatlona"	Nominated
2010	GiMA Award	Gima Award for Best Popular Music Album	Chaandan Mein	Solo Album	Won
2010	Indian Television Academy Awards	Best Title Song	Tere Liye	"Tere Liye"	Won
2010	Indian Telly Awards	Best Title Song	Tere Liye	"Tere Liye"	Won
2011	Zee Rishtey Awards	Favourite Guru-Shisya	Sa Re Ga Ma Pa L'il Champs	—N/a	Nominated
2011	Filmfare Award for Best Male Playback Singer - Kannada	Best Male Playback Singer	Jackie	"Ekka Raja Rani"	Nominated
2012	Indian Telly Award	Best Title Singer for a TV Show	Diya Aur Baati Hum	Title Song	Won
2013	Nandi Awards	Nandi Award for Best Male Playback Singer	Mirchi	"Pandagala Digivachchavu"	Won
2014	Filmfare Award for Best Male Playback Singer - Telugu	Best Male Playback Singer	Mirchi	"Pandagala Digivacchavu"	Won
2015	Filmfare Award for Best Male Playback Singer - Kannada	Best Male Playback Singer	Un Samayal Arayil	"Ee Janumave Ahaa"	Nominated

Year	Award(s)	Category	Result
2011	Nepal Tourism Year Goodwill Ambassador 2011	Overall Contribution	Won
2010	Yash Bharti Award	Excellence in folk and classical music	Won
2017	Padma Shri – Fourth Highest Indian National Honour	Art-Music	Won
2019	SIIMA Award for Best Male Playback Singer – Telugu	Bharat Ane Nenu	Nominated
