= Indian television drama =

Soap operas written, produced, and filmed in India, with characters played by Indians

Indian television dramas, also known as Indian series or Indian serials, are scripted television programmes produced in India and featuring Indian actors. These dramas are broadcast on various Indian television networks.

India's first television drama, Hum Log (Hindi), aired from 1984 to 1985 and consisted of 154 episodes. Ekta Kapoor's Kyunki Saas Bhi Kabhi Bahu Thi (2000–2008) became the first Indian television drama to surpass 1,000 episodes, completing 1,833 episodes and earning a place in the Limca Book of Records. The Marathi series Char Divas Sasuche (2001–2013) reached 3,200 episodes, becoming the first Indian television series to exceed 3,000 episodes, also entering the Limca Book of Records. The Telugu serial Abhishekam (2008–2022) was the first Indian show to reach 4,000 episodes, concluding on 1 February 2022. The Hindi series Yeh Rishta Kya Kehlata Hai (2009–present), with over 5,000 episodes as of December, 2025, is India's longest-running Hindi television drama and soap opera, having aired for 16 years and is the first to reach that mark

Indian television dramas are produced in most major languages spoken across the country, often blending the regional language with English. These shows are also broadcast in several other regions, including South Asia, the Caribbean, Southeast Asia, Central Asia, Europe, the Middle East, North America, Latin America, and parts of Africa.

By the late 2010s, the popularity of daytime and afternoon dramas had declined, and mainstream channels ceased broadcasting such programmes. However, in 2017, television networks attempted to regain viewership by reintroducing shows in the afternoon and daytime slots. Currently, the major Indian television networks with nationwide prime-time dramas include JioStar, Zee, Sun TV, and ETV.

Hum Log was India's first television drama, airing from 1984 to 1985 with a total of 154 episodes. At the time, it was the longest-running serial in Indian television history. The show attracted approximately 60 million viewers, with each episode lasting about 25 minutes, except for the final episode, which was approximately 55 minutes long.

== Impact ==
Television dramas have had a significant impact on Indian society, influencing issues related to national integration, identity, globalisation, the status of women, ethics, and social issues in rural areas. The first Indian television drama series, Hum Log, was originally conceptualised as a family planning programme but soon evolved into an entertainment-oriented show. Despite this shift, it continued to promote pro-development messages, serving as a model for using television serials as a form of "edutainment"—a concept later adopted in several countries around the world.

A 2007 study examining the introduction of cable television in rural India found that it led to "significant decreases in the reported acceptability of domestic violence towards women and son preference, as well as increases in women's autonomy and decreases in fertility." The study also presented "suggestive evidence that exposure to cable television increases school enrolment among younger children, possibly due to the increased participation of women in household decision-making."

== Television rating point and rankings ==
Since the 2000s, Indian television serials have relied on television rating points (TRPs)—also referred to as target rating points—as key indicators and benchmarks of a programme's success, used to measure audience interest and viewership.

Storylines in many serials are frequently modified based on TRP performance. In some cases, declining TRP levels have resulted in shows being concluded prematurely or ending abruptly.

TRPs are calculated using the total number of people in the target audience as the denominator and the number of people from that audience who watched the programme as the numerator, multiplied by 100. The basic formula for TRP calculation is:

- TRP = (Number of viewers in the sample audience / Total target audience) × 100.

== International reception ==
=== Afghanistan ===
Indian soap operas gained immense popularity in Afghanistan during the 2000s, building upon the long-standing appeal of Bollywood cinema in the region. In 2006, a Reuters report highlighted the broadcast of Kyunki Saas Bhi Kabhi Bahu Thi, dubbed into Dari, which captivated a wide audience across the country.

Men, women, young, and old—anyone with access to a television—became enthralled by the family drama.

Reports suggested that, during the years of conflict in Afghanistan, armed militants occasionally paused fighting to watch Indian television dramas.

However, the growing popularity of Indian serials also drew criticism from conservative groups who regarded them as a threat to Afghanistan’s religious and national values. Responding to such concerns, the government of Hamid Karzai ordered television broadcasters to halt the airing of Indian dramas in April 2008. Several broadcasters refused to comply, arguing that the ban contravened the country's media law.

Afghanistan's first domestically produced television drama serial, Palwasha, was created by Aina Afghan Media and began airing on 25 November 2007. Although filmed in Kabul and in Dari, the series was directed by an Indian filmmaker and featured several Indian contributors. The lead role was portrayed by Indian actress Sonal Udeshi.

=== Brazil ===
Caminho das Índias (India: A Love Story), a popular Brazilian television soap opera, was centred on Indian culture and became widely popular in Brazil.

=== Dubai ===
Khwaish, which aired on Sony Entertainment Television and ARY Digital, became a popular show in Dubai in 2007. In 2016, responding to strong audience interest, A-Plus TV dubbed the Hindi romantic drama Jeevan Saathi – Humsafar Zindagi Ke from Colors TV into Urdu, further enhancing its appeal among viewers.

=== Indonesia ===
Indian television dramas such as Uttaran and Balika Vadhu achieved significant success in Indonesia, where they were dubbed in Indonesian and aired multiple times until their conclusions. Saath Nibhaana Saathiya was also highly popular and was broadcast under the title Gopi, named after the main character. It aired from 15 September 2016 to 19 April 2017 and was rebroadcast from 2021 to 2022, with the Indonesian version comprising around 600 episodes.

Other serials, including Yeh Hai Mohabbatein, Ishq Mein Marjawan, Kumkum Bhagya (aired in Indonesian as Lonceng Cinta), Anupamaa, Imlie, Naagin, and Silsila Badalte Rishton Ka, also received high TRP ratings in Indonesia. Additionally, serials such as Sapne Suhane Ladakpan Ke, Jabb Love Hua, Kumkum Bhagya, and Punar Vivaah were broadcast on Zee Hiburan, the 24-hour general entertainment channel of Zee TV in Indonesia, following the success of their original Hindi versions.

Dastaan-E-Mohabbat Salim Anarkali was also dubbed in Indonesian and telecast on ANTV.

=== United Kingdom ===
Rab Se Sohna Isshq, a love triangle drama from Zee TV, was set and filmed in London. It was the first cross-continental show in Indian television history. The series was later dubbed in English as Eternal Love and broadcast on Zee World and its sister channel Zee TV UK.

=== Ivory Coast and Senegal ===
Vaidehi – Ek Aur Agni Pareeksha gained notable popularity in Ivory Coast and Senegal. In 2010, responding to strong audience demand, the series was dubbed into Arabic to reach a wider audience.

=== Nepal ===
In the mid-2000s, Indian television dramas such as Kyunki Saas Bhi Kabhi Bahu Thi, Kahaani Ghar Ghar Kii, and Kasautii Zindagii Kay gained widespread popularity in Nepal, attracting large audiences. This surge in popularity encouraged the production of more Nepali serials, including Sindur, Maiti, and Ghat Pratighat, which were developed to cater to the increasing television audience.

=== Pakistan ===
Indian television dramas have been widely popular in Pakistan, with shows such as Kyunki Saas Bhi Kabhi Bahu Thi achieving higher viewership than local Pakistani serials. Their popularity is partly attributed to the mutual intelligibility between Urdu and Hindi.

However, the Supreme Court of Pakistan has prohibited the broadcast of Indian films and television shows. Despite this, the BBC reported that many cable television operators in Pakistan continue to air Indian serials in violation of the ban due to high demand. Indian TV shows constitute nearly 60% of all foreign programmes broadcast in the country.

In June 2006, Pakistani comedian Rauf Lala won the Indian comedy show The Great Indian Laughter Challenge, but Pakistani audiences were unable to watch it due to the broadcasting restrictions. An official commented that "Bollywood and Indian TV drama have invaded our homes".

Indian TV dramas have become so popular in Pakistan that mainstream newspapers, such as the Pakistan Tribune, frequently publish articles on these shows. Many viewers have resorted to satellite connections to access uninterrupted broadcasts of Indian programmes.

Despite historical anti-Indian sentiment and four wars over approximately 50 years, Indian television shows and Bollywood have contributed to a shift in perception, with many Pakistanis viewing India and its people more favourably. Indian tourists visiting Pakistan have noted that locals tend to be particularly friendly when they learn the visitor is from India.

On 27 October 2018, the Supreme Court of Pakistan reinstated the ban on Indian content on local television channels. Channels such as Filmazia and Urdu 1 temporarily suspended Indian programming following the ruling.

=== Russia ===
The Indian television serial Dishayen was dubbed in Russian and gained popularity in Russia in 2005.

=== Sri Lanka ===
The Hindi serials Kyunki Saas Bhi Kabhi Bahu Thi and Kasautii Zindagii Kay were dubbed in Sinhala and received a positive response in Sri Lanka. Another popular show, Kindurangana, a remake of the Hindi serial Kasamh Se, also garnered favourable reception among Sri Lankan viewers. Additionally, the serial Shanti, which was popular during the 1990s, was dubbed in Sinhala and broadcast in Sri Lanka.

=== Turkey ===
Iss Pyaar Ko Kya Naam Doon was dubbed in Turkish for broadcast in Turkey.

=== Africa ===
Tu Tevha Tashi, a Marathi daily soap, was dubbed in English as Never Too Late for Love for African audiences and broadcast on Zee Africa.

=== Other countries ===
The series The Iron Handed Phantom – Mayavi was dubbed in Mandarin and Korean and was also broadcast in Europe and Australia.

Additionally, several popular Colors TV dramas, including Madhubala – Ek Ishq Ek Junoon, Balika Vadhu, Chakravartin Ashoka Samrat, Chandrakanta, Udaan, Naagin, Shakti, Ishq Mein Marjawan, and Bepannah, were dubbed in Thai to cater to audiences in Thailand and other South Asian markets, including Vietnam.

== See also ==
- Tamil television drama
- List of longest-running Indian television series
