= Shibani Dandekar =

Indian-Australian singer, actress, anchor and model (born 1980)

Shibani Akhtar
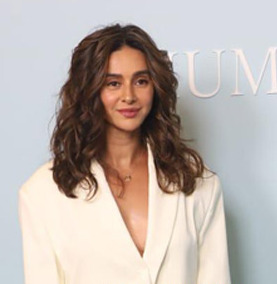
- Dandekar in 2024
- Born: Shibani Dandekar; 27 August 1980 (age 45); Pune, Maharashtra, India
- Citizenship: Australia
- Occupations: VJ; model; singer; anchor
- Years active: 2001–2023
- Spouse: Farhan Akhtar (m. 2022)
- Relatives: Anusha Dandekar (sister)

Shibani Akhtar (née Dandekar; born 27 August 1980) is an Indian-Australian singer, actress, host and model. She began her career working as a television host on American television. Following her return to India, she began hosting several shows and events on Hindi television, besides working as a model and singer. She was one of the co-hosts of the 2019 ICC Cricket World Cup. She was also a contestant on Jhalak Dikhhla Jaa 5 (2012) and Fear Factor: Khatron Ke Khiladi 8 (2017). She is married to actor and producer Farhan Akhtar.

== Early and personal life ==
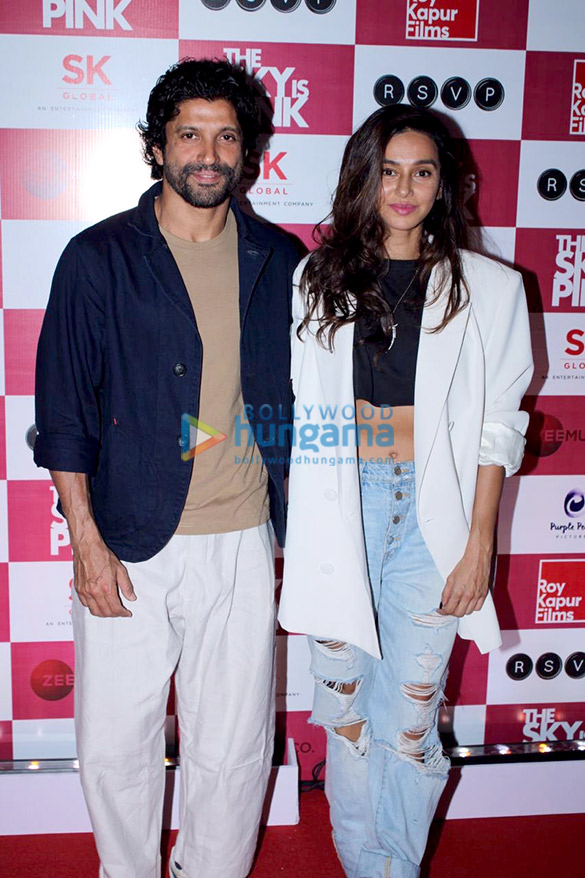
Dandekar with Farhan Akhtar in 2019

Dandekar was born in Pune as the eldest daughter into a Marathi family. Her father Shashidhar Dandekar is a theatre actor in Australia and her mother Sulabha Dandekar works in Qantas Airways, Australia. She has two sisters, Anusha Dandekar, an actress-singer working in Bollywood, and Apeksha Dandekar. Dandekar, along with her sisters, formed a music band named D-Major. Dandekar grew up in Australia and Africa for the majority of her childhood. She also holds an Overseas Citizenship of India card.

Dandekar started dating Bollywood filmmaker and actor Farhan Akhtar in 2018, just after his divorce from Adhuna Bhabani in 2017. On 19 February 2022, they got married in a non-religious ceremony at Farhan's father's farmhouse in Khandala. After marriage, she publicly adopted her husband's last name by dropping her maiden last name on social media.

== Career ==
In 2001, she was hit by a car then after the incident she moved to New York City and began working in American television. She hosted three nationally syndicated television shows, Namaste America, V Desi and the Asian Variety Show. In this role, she introduced Bollywood's biggest stars to American audiences and also hosted An Evening With Shah Rukh Khan in Atlantic City. She has been a contestant on Jhalak Dikhhla Jaa, the India-based Dancing With the Stars on the BBC network and hosted in India on Colors TV.

She returned to India and continued her work as a television host, while venturing into modelling as well.

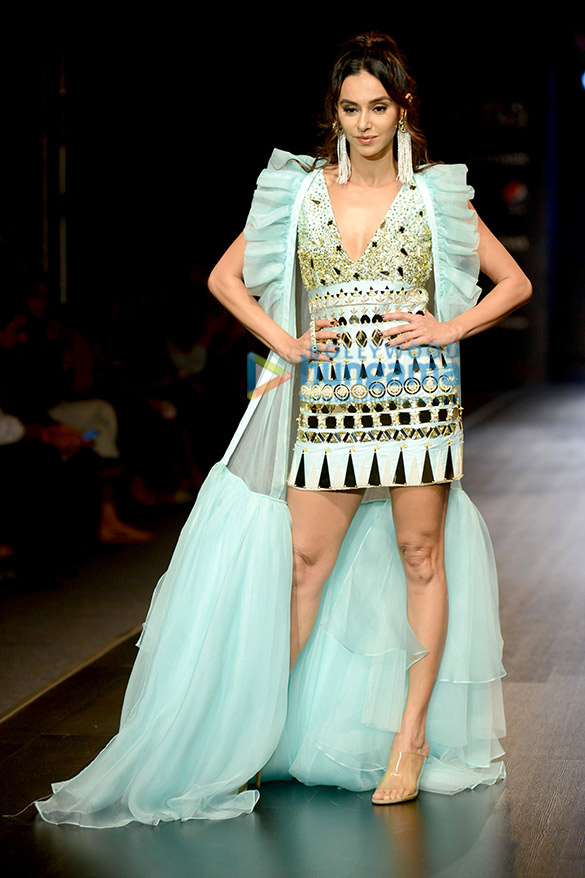
Dandekar walking the ramp in 2019

Apart from music and modeling, Dandekar's love for anchoring shows saw her as host for major events such as the Maxim Hot 100, Nike, Rolls-Royce, Puma, Mercedes, Toyota, Horlicks, HSBC, Spice Mobile, JBL, MTV Coke Studio, Nivea and the Sony Launch of the tribute to Michael Jackson's "This is It". Dandekar has anchored popular shows including the lifestyle shows After Hours on Zee Cafe, Men 2.0 on AXN, ZoOm's Let's Design, India's Sexiest Bachelor on Big CBS Prime, as well as its extension India's Glam Diva on Big CBS Love. Dandekar also anchored the Indian produced Grammy Nominees Special on VH1 as a lead-up to the 53rd Grammy Awards. Since 2011, she has been co-hosting the show Extraa Innings – T20 on Sony Max Television during the Indian Premier League matches; she won a nomination at the 11th Indian Television Academy Awards in the category Best Anchor Game/Quiz Show. She is hosting the Mission cover shot for National Geography channel. She did a dance number Hi Poli Saajuk for 2014's Marathi movie Timepass, followed by 36 Nakhrewali in Sangharsh. She played the role 'Zoya' in the movie Roy which was released on 13 February 2015. In 2017, Dandekar participated in Khatron Ke Khiladi 8 and eliminated in the first week at 12th place. In 2019, she hosted the opening ceremony of ICC Cricket World Cup 2019 along with Andrew Flintoff and Paddy McGuinness in which her husband Farhan Akhtar also appeared as a guest representing India.

== Filmography ==
=== Film ===
Key
†	Denotes films that have not yet been released

Year	Title	Role	Language	Notes
2014	Timepass		Marathi	
2014	Sangharsh	Chameli	Marathi	
2015	Roy	Zoya	Hindi	
2015	Shaandaar	Sonia	Hindi	
2016	Sultan	TV Host	Hindi	
2017	Naam Shabana		Hindi	Special appearance in a song
2017	Noor	Zara Patel	Hindi	
2018	Bhavesh Joshi	Item girl	Hindi	in the song "Chavanprash"
2021	Love in the Times of Corona		Hindi; English	Voot Select anthology film; segment "Dinner in Lockdown"

=== Television ===
Year	Shows	Role	Notes
2001	Namaste America	Host	
2001	V Desi	Host	
2001	Asian Variety Show	Host	
2009	After Hours	Host	
2010	Let's Design	Host	
2010	AXN's Men 2.0	Host	
2011	India's Sexiest Bachelor	Host	
2012	Jhalak Dikhhla Jaa 5	Contestant	8th place
2012	Mission Cover Shot	Host	
2013	Grammy Nominees	Host	
2013	Style and the City	Host	
2011-15	Indian Premier League	Host	
2015	I Can Do That	Contestant	
2017	Fear Factor: Khatron Ke Khiladi 8	Contestant	12th place
2018	Top Model India	Mentor	
2020	Four More Shots Please	Sushmita Sengupta	Season 2
2020	Hostages	Isha Andrews	Season 2
2020	What the Love! with Karan Johar	Herself	Guest
2023	Made in Heaven	Aditi	Season 2
