= Dipannita Sharma =

Indian actress and supermodel

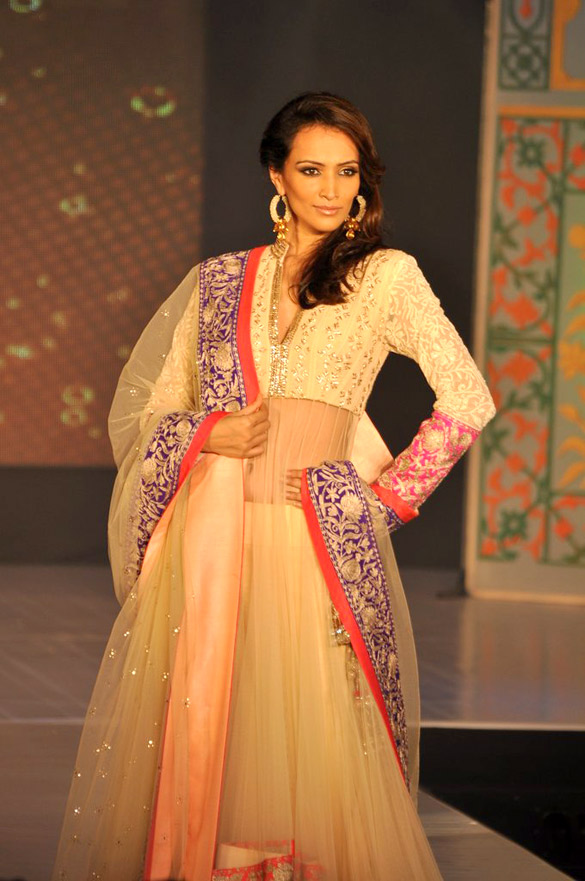
- Sharma from The Manish Malhotra - Lilavati Hospital's 'Save and Empower the Girl Child' show
- Born: Duliajan, Assam, India
- Education: Indraprastha College for Women
- Occupations: Actress, model
- Years active: 2002–present
- Spouse: Dilsher Singh Atwal (m. 2008)
- Relatives: Arunima Sharma (sister)

Dipannita Sharma is an Indian actress and model.

== Career ==
Sharma came into the limelight after making it to the final five of the Miss India 1998 contest. She also won 'Miss Photogenic' title in the same contest. She has walked the ramp for all major designers in the country and for international design houses such as Valentino & Fendi in India. She was the worldwide face of the press campaign for Breguet watches and jewellery for 5 years. She has endorsed and been the face of several skin care brands in India such as Garnier, Nivea and Dettol soap. She has also hosted television shows, been a judge on a fashion based show on MTV - MTV making the cut and acted in the lead role on a show called Life Nahi Hai Laddoo before making her film debut with the 2002 Bollywood film 16 December.

== Personal life ==
Dipannita was born in the Oil India Limited colony town of Duliajan in Assam. Her father was a doctor in the O.I.L. Hospital. She studied in the Holy Child School Guwahati till her ninth standard, and pursued the rest of her school academics from St. Mary's school, Naharkatia. She later graduated in History from Indraprastha College for Women, Delhi.

Dipannita is married to Delhi entrepreneur Dilsher Singh Atwal, a third generation businessman, and who is into his family business of mining, and lives in Mumbai, India. Her younger sister is a television actress Arunima Sharma who is best known for her role as Rano in the soap opera Kasamh Se.

== Filmography ==
=== Films ===
Year	Title	Role	Other notes
2002	16 December	Sheeba	Nominated - Zee Cine Awards and Star Screen Awards for Best Debut Female
2002	Dil Vil Pyar Vyar	Payal Singh	
2003	Jajantaram Mamantaram	Mermaid	
2004	Asambhav	Kinjal	
2005	My Brother…Nikhil	Leena Gomes	
2005	Koi Aap Sa	Preeti	
2005	99.9 FM	Sonali	
2011	Ladies vs Ricky Bahl	Raina Parulekar	Nominated — Zee Cine Awards 2012 Best Supporting Actor Female
2012	Jodi Breakers	Maggie	
2014	Pizza	Mrs. Ghost	
2015	Take It Easy	Rama	
2017	Coffee with D	Neha	
2017	Xhoixobote Dhemalite		First Assamese film
2019	War	Dr. Mallika Singhal	
2020	Pepper Chicken	RJ Vaidehi	
2021	Raat Baaki Hai	Vaani Chopra	ZEE5 film
2021	Love in the Times of Corona		Voot Select anthology film; segment "August: A Short Hello"
2023	Neeyat	Noor Suri	
2024	Kooki	S.P. Mandira Singh	

=== Shows/Short films/Web series ===
Serial	Channel
Har Dil Jo Love Karega	Zoom
Wills Lifestyle India Fashion Week	STAR World
Fear Factor: Khatron Ke Khiladi 1	Colors TV
Rishta.com	Sony Entertainment Television
MTV Making The Cut	MTV India
Piya Kay Ghar Jana Hai	Ary Digital
Untag	Voot
Bewafaa sii Wafaa	ALTBalaji
Pyaar Actually	Disney+ Hotstar
Six	Disney+ Hotstar
Saving Chintu	Disney+ Hotstar
Mismatched	Netflix

== Music videos ==
Title	Year	Performer(s)	Album
Dil Kare	2001	Artist -Sukhbir	Dil Kare (2001)
Hai Re Hai Mera Ghungta (Remix)	2004	Music- Lesle Lewis, Video Directed by Indrajit Nattoji	Colonial Cousins
Thoda Sa Thehro (Remix)	2008	Music- Kalyanji–Anandji, Remix by Dj Megha Kawale	

== See also ==
- List of Indian film actresses
