= Sugathapala =

Sugathapala is both a given name and a surname. Notable people with the name include:

- Sugathapala de Silva (1928–2002), Sri Lankan dramatist
- Sugathapala Senarath Yapa (born 1935), Sri Lankan director
- Edna Sugathapala (1946–2018), Sri Lankan actress
