= Akshita Kapoor =

Indian television actress

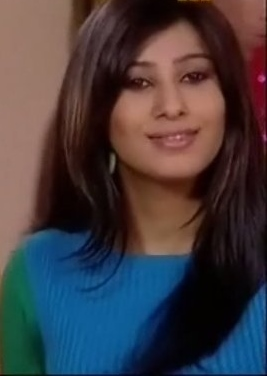
- Akshita Kapoor in Kitani Mohabbat Hai.
- Occupations: Actress; Model
- Years active: 2002–2009

Akshita Kapoor is an Indian television actress. She has appeared in a number of television serials but is perhaps mostly known for playing the role of, "Krishna Walia", after Diya Sonecha in Zee Tv's Kasamh Se and also has played the role of "Tanu" in Kahaani Ghar Ghar Kii. Akshita Kapoor also played the role of Antra who is Arohi's sister in Kitani Mohobbat Hai on NDTV Imagine.

== Career ==
Akshita started her career from Shaka Laka Boom Boom in 2002 and later played an important role in Star Plus' Aek Chabhi Hai Padoss Mein in 2006. Her biggest break came in 2006, when she played the role of Tanu in Ekta Kapoor's path-breaking Indian soap opera Kahaani Ghar Ghar Kii.

She then appeared in a number of Ekta Kapoor's television serials and is best remembered for her roles as "Krishna Walia", after in Kasamh Se on Zee TV and "Antra" who is Arohi's sister in Kitani Mohabbat Hai on Imagine TV.

== Television roles ==
- Shaka Laka Boom Boom (2002–2003)
- Aek Chabhi Hai Padoss Mein (2006)
- Kahaani Ghar Ghar Kii (2006–2008)
- Kya Dill Mein Hai (2007–2008)
- Kasamh Se (2008–2009)
- Kitani Mohabbat Hai (2009)
