= Arunima Sharma =

Indian actress (born 1981)

- Born: Duliajan, Assam
- Occupation: Actress
- Years active: 2006–2007
- Relatives: Dipannita Sharma (sister)

Arunima Sharma (born 23 August 1981) is an Indian actress, who is mostly known for playing Rano Bali in the soap opera on Zee TV, Kasamh Se. Rano Bali is one of the three female leads and the youngest sister of protagonist Bani Walia.

== Early life and career ==
Arunima was born in Duliajan, Assam and moved to Mumbai in 1997 for further studies. She has also been a part of TV show, Kaisa Ye Pyar Hai. While she was in the show, Arunima was known to play the brainy sister. Arunima left Kasamh Se due to back pain. In addition, she wanted to spend more time with her family. Arunima was replaced by Pallavi Subhash Chandran. Also, Arunima played Sonu Agarwal in the Star Plus series Kahani Ghar Ghar Ki from 2006 to 2007. She is the younger sister of supermodel and actress Dipannita Sharma.

== Television ==
Year	Title	Role	Notes
2006-2009	Kasamh Se	Rano (The Youngest of three sisters)	
2006-2007	Kahaani Ghar Ghar Kii	Sunaina Agarwal	
2006	Kkavyanjali		
2007	Kahaani Ghar Ghar Kii		
