= Aditi Vasudev =

Indian film actress

- Occupation: Actress
- Years active: 2010–present

Aditi Vasudev is an Indian actress, known for her roles in the comedy-drama film Do Dooni Chaar (2010) and the comedy film Sulemani Keeda (2014). She has made her TV debut in the serial Meri Aawaaz Hi Pehchaan Hain in February 2016, with her role as the young Ketaki, along with Amrita Rao, who also made her TV debut in the same serial playing Kalyani, the elder sister of Ketaki. The TV serial is telecast on &TV channel.

== Early life and education ==
Vasudev attended Welham Girls' School in Dehradun, and then moved to Mumbai to attend the Barry John School for three months.

== Career ==
She started her career with the small but successful film Do Dooni Chaar, directed by Habib Faisal. She was recommended by her co-star for her role in Sulemani Keeda. Though she was not convinced about the film in the conception stage, she got on board when she liked the final draft.

== Filmography ==
Year	Title	Role	Notes
2018	Heat	Zara	
2017	Coma Café	Kara	
2017	Tara Versus	Tara	
2017	Devi: Goddess	Tara	
2014	Sulemani Keeda	Ruma	
2014	Watchdogs	Meher	
2013	Skin Deep	Sushma	
2012	Talaash: The Answer Lies Within	Mallika	
2010	Do Dooni Chaar	Payal Duggal	
2022	Love Hostel	Nidhi Dahiya	

== Television ==
Year	Title	Role	Notes
2016	Meri Awaaz Hi Pehchaan Hai	Ketki Gaikwad	Debut Show
2017	Bewafaa sii Wafaa	Megna	ALTBalaji Original
2019	Flip	Esta	Eros Now
2020	Kehne Ko Humsafar Hain	Amaira	Web series released on ALTBalaji and ZEE5
2021	Cartel	Shweta	Web series released on ALTBalaji and MX Player

== See also ==
- List of Indian film actresses
- List of people from Mumbai
