= Govind Kumar Singh =

Indian fashion designer

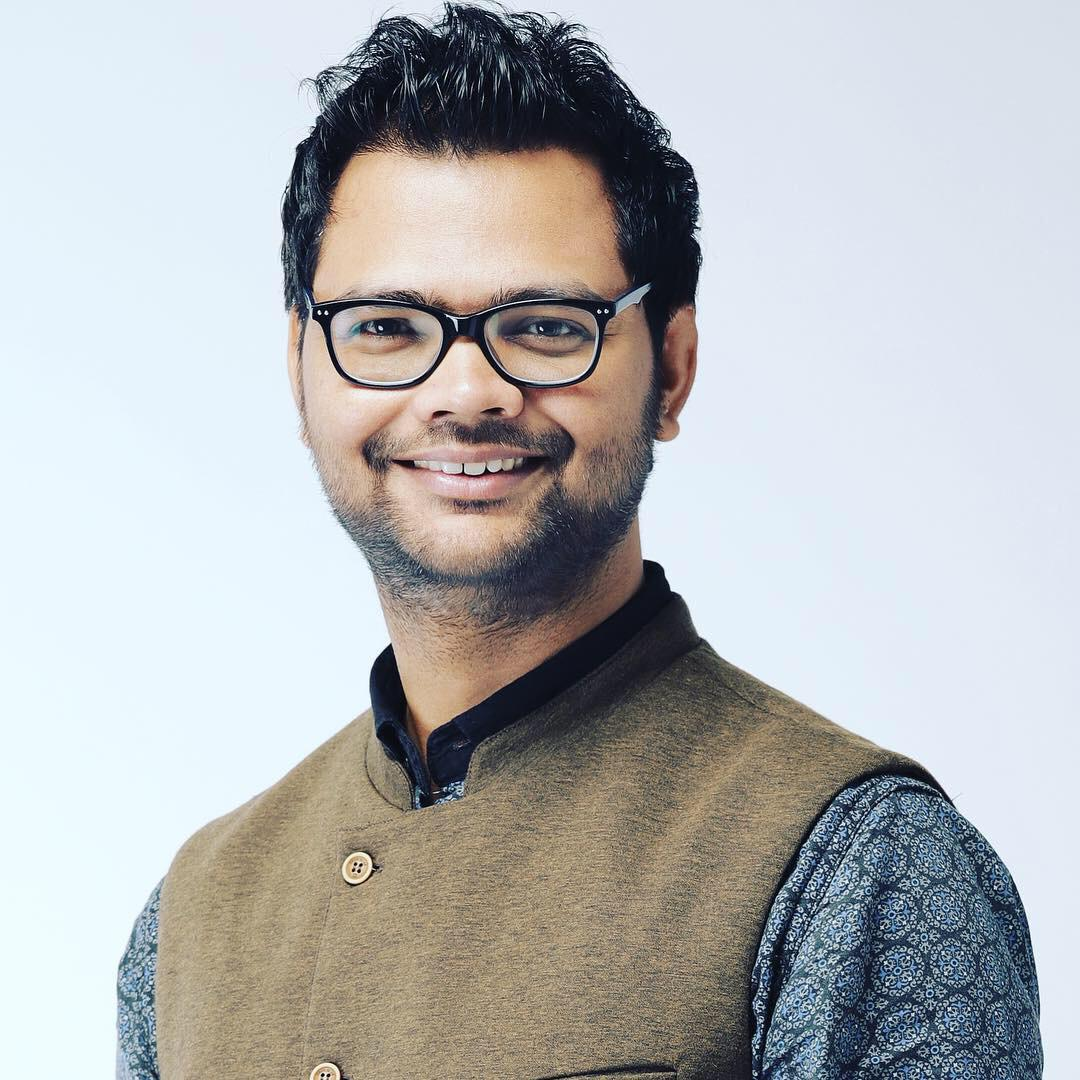
- Born: Supaul district, Bihar, India
- Education: National Institute of Fashion Technology (NIFT)
- Occupations: Fashion designer, assistant professor
- Website: govindkumarsingh.com

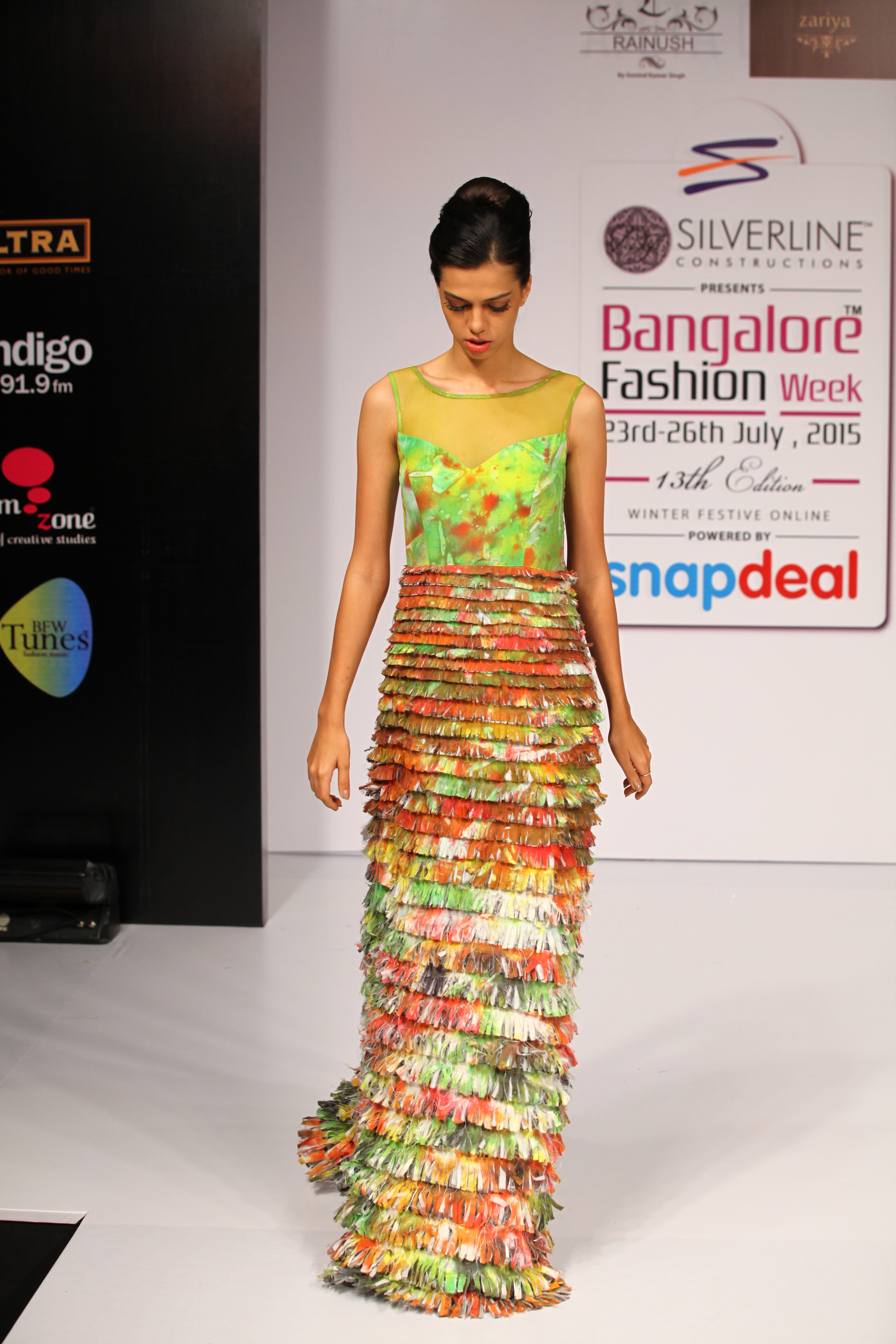
Model in a Govind Kumar Singh's design (Spring Summer 2013 collection) at Bangalore Fashion Week

Govind Kumar Singh is an Indian fashion designer. He has appeared in two series of Let's Design, a television reality show, on Zoom and won the 2011 series.

== Early life and career ==
Singh is from the Supaul district of Bihar. He graduated from the National Institute of Fashion Technology (NIFT) in Bangalore, India. As of 2015, he was appointed as assistant professor, fashion design, at the NIFT campus in Shillong. In 2012–13 he conducted skills development programmes related to fashion design for the rural women of Assam.

== Recognition ==
Singh's label, Rainush, was launched soon after he had success in a television competition. He won the reality-based competition Let's Design in 2011. As with all the other competitors in the series, he had to work with cotton to design an haute couture collection. In 2010 he won the Most Creative and Innovative Design Collection Award in the NIFT Graduation Fashion show. He also won an award for the best prêt-à-porter garment in the first season of Let's Design, 2009.
