= Natasha Rastogi =

Indian actress and director

- Born: Natasha Khanna; New Delhi, India
- Occupations: Actress, Director
- Years active: 2000–present
- Spouse: Puneet Rastogi (1981-present)
- Relatives: Sankalp Rastogi (brother-in-law)

Natasha Rastogi (born Natasha Khanna) is an Indian actress and director.

She started her acting career by debuting in Monsoon Wedding as Sona Verma, directed by Mira Nair, that won the Golden Lion award and received a Golden Globe Award nomination. She has played many roles on screen and on stage. She was awarded the Best Actress Award in Mahindra Excellence in Theatre Awards 2007 for Nati Binodini, directed by Amal Allana. She appeared in Do Dooni Chaar as Salma in 2010. She has acted in the TV series Gulaal as Panbaa.

== Early life ==
Natasha was born in a Hindu family to Rachna Khanna and Dr. Triloki Nath Khanna, a professor of Hindi in Zakir Husain College, Delhi. She graduated with a Bachelor's in Art from the College of Art, Delhi.

== Career ==
Natasha started her career as a drama teacher in Modern School (New Delhi) in 1992. As a part of her job, she was assigned the responsibility of directing and choreographing plays including the signature event, valedictory function. She choreographed musical ballets involving 280 students for 12 years. Some of these plays were namely Nav Prabhat, Spring –The Reawakening, Swarnim Vriksh, Amrit Manthan, Sunderland Mein Alice, Ek Aur Panchtantra, Ek Aur Ek Gyarah, Sunoh Kahani, Wings of Desire and Dhun ka Jadoogar. Working with everyone involved in the play, from costume designer to script writer, from makeup artist to music director, she honed her skills as an artist.

After 12 years of service, Natasha joined Amal Alana's theater group. Since then she has been a part of a theater group that has travelled across the globe doing plays in places like London, Mexico, Lahore and including every metropolitan city in India.

== Filmography ==
=== Films ===
Year	Title	Role	Notes
2001	Monsoon Wedding	Sona Verma	
2004	American Daylight		
2004	Chai Pani Etc		
2006	Khosla Ka Ghosla	Women Social Liberation head	
2010	Do Dooni Chaar	Salma	
2010	My Name Is Khan		
2012	Ishaqzaade	Parvati Chauhan	
2014	Kaanchi	Teji	
2014	Amit Sahni Ki List	Amit's Mother	
2014	Jigariyaa	Shaamu's mother	
2015	Talvar		
2017	Naam Shabana	Farida Begum Khan	
2017	Behen Hogi Teri	Gattu's mother	
2018	High Jack	Mrs. Taneja	
2020	Raat Akeli Hai	Mrs Raghuveer Singh	
2021	Pagglait	Alka Pandey	
2021	Love in the Times of Corona		Voot Select anthology film; segment "Tea and a Rose"
2023	Thank You for Coming	Dr. Bina Kapoor	
2024	Ulajh	Saroj Bhatia	
2025	Azaad	Nani	
2025	Gustaakh Ishq	Mother	
2025	The Great Shamsuddin Family	Nabeela	Released on JioHotstar

=== Television ===
Year	Title	Role
	Jasoos Vijay	
	Zindagi Kitni Khubsurat Hai	
	Ji Mantri Ji	
	Kunki Jeena Isi Ka Naam Hai	
	Powder	
	Gulaal	Panbaa
2015–2018	Sense8	Priya Dandekar
2016	Dahleez	Zubeida Jilani
2017	Love Ka Hai Intezaar	
2024	Heeramandi	Nasreen Bano
