= Love in the Times of Corona =

Indian Hindi-language anthology film

- Promotional poster
- Directed by: Indrani Ray
- Written by: Indrani Ray
- Produced by: Tanvi Gadhvi
- Starring: Dipannita Sharma; Shibani Dandekar; Shekhar Ravjiani; Adil Hussain; Natasha Rastogi
- Distributed by: Voot Select
- Release date: 26 July 2021
- Country: India
- Languages: Hindi; English

Love in the Times of Corona is a 2021 Indian Hindi-language anthology film written and directed by Indrani Ray starring Dipannita Sharma, Shibani Dandekar, Shekhar Ravjiani, Adil Hussain and Natasha Rastogi. The film was directly released on Voot Select on 26 July 2021.

== Cast ==
August: A Short Hello	Dinner in Lockdown	Tea and a Rose
Dipannita Sharma	Shibani Dandekar; Shekhar Ravjiani as Nirvik Singh	Adil Hussain as Sen; Natasha Rastogi

== Reception ==
Ronak Kotecha of The Times of India rated the film 3.5/5 stars and wrote, "all the stories are heartwarming and uncomplicated enough to find something to connect with, for everyone. The makers must be lauded for putting together a superior product with micro-crews working remotely, shaping it from script to screen, without compromising on the cinematic quality". Shreya Paul of Firstpost gave the same rating and wrote, "Love in the Times of Corona is yet another example of artful filmmaking that ought to be bolstered for it to pave the way for more. The film is further proof that women narrating women’s stories is cathartic (in its accuracy) and are artful retellings of what millions feel but cannot express". Shaheen of OTTplay gave the same rating and wrote, "From the feeling of happiness to experiencing the warmth of being with someone, Love In The Times of Corona is an out-and-out feel-good film that seldom doesn't but mostly gets its message right. While A Short Hello and Dinner In Lockdown are a one-time watch, Tea and a Rose merit multiple viewings".
