= Miss Sri Lanka Online =

Annual online beauty pageant

Miss Sri Lanka Online is an annual online beauty pageant. Miss Sri Lanka Online primarily used Facebook to run the contest. It is said to be the world's first major online beauty pageant. The contest debuted in 2012. In 2019 the event got a new look with new sponsors and a more interactive website in 2019. The first event was streamed online live to a global audience on 6 December 2012.

== Contest ==
The national level pageant takes entries locally and from Sri Lankans living overseas. Applicants log onto a website which then directs them to the Facebook page where they can upload a photograph of themselves which will be judged. The best 50 contestants are then selected and the public votes ('Like' on Facebook) for their preferred contestant.

The top 25 candidates then provide three more photographs and a short video clip, which again will be voted for by the public. The finalists are judged by a panel. The finale where the winner is unveiled is an event streamed live globally online.

== Judges ==
The panel of judges have included:

- Bollywood star Vivek Oberoi
- Bollywood, Tollywood and Kollywood actress Sameera Reddy
- Australia's Got Talent winner 2012 Andrew De Silva
- Actress and former Miss Sri Lanka for Miss World Yureni Noshika
- Brand Director for Seri Naturals Shayana Raat
- COO of Seri Naturals Malik Perera
- Director and Founder of Colombo Fashion Week Ajay Singh
- Celebrity hairstylist and founder of Chagall (Colombo-Sydney) Gerald Solomons
- Celebrity hairstylist and founder of Capello Salons Romesh Atapattu

== Winners ==
The winner of Miss Sri Lanka Online 2012 was Maria Alkasas. The 1st Runner up was Angela Richard. The 2nd Runner up was Karandza Fernando.
