= Bewafaa sii Wafaa =

2017 Indian Hindi web series

- Genre: Romance; Suspense; Drama
- Developed by: Ekta Kapoor
- Screenplay by: Vibha Singh; Dialogues; Eisha Chopra
- Story by: Vibha Singh
- Directed by: Sonam Nair; Ranjan Singh
- Creative director: Nimisha Pandey
- Starring: Samir Soni; Aditi Vasudev; Dipannita Sharma
- Theme music composer: Amit Trivedi
- Opening theme: "Bewafaa sii Wafaa, Ishq Ne Di Sazaa"
- Composers: Background Music; Aashish Rego
- Country of origin: India
- Original languages: Hindi; English
- No. of seasons: 1
- No. of episodes: 10

Production
- Producers: Fazila Allana; Kamna Nirula Menezes
- Editors: Vikas Sharma; Vishal Sharma; Sandeep Bhatti
- Camera setup: Multi-camera
- Running time: 18-28 minutes
- Production company: SOL Productions

Original release
- Network: ALT Balaji
- Release: 21 April 2017

Bewafaa sii Wafaa is a 2017 Hindi web series, created by Ekta Kapoor for her video on demand platform ALTBalaji. It stars Samir Soni, Aditi Vasudev and Dipannita Sharma as Protagonists. The web series is about two people who are madly in love but married to different people.

The series is available for streaming on the ALT Balaji App and its associated websites since its release date.

== Cast ==
- Samir Soni as Sumair Singh Bajaj
- Aditi Vasudev as Meghna Dixit
- Dipannita Sharma as Nishqa S. Bajaj.
- Yudhishtir Urs as Adi/ Aditya Dixit
