= Iskoleta Man Awa =

- promotional poster
- Sinhala: ඉස්කෝලෙට මං ආවා
- Directed by: Prasad Samarathunga
- Written by: Prasad Samarathunga
- Produced by: Sandun Dolamulla
- Starring: Kumara Wanduressa; Udith Abeyrathna; Edna Sugathapala
- Cinematography: Sumith Kumarage
- Edited by: Shan Alwis
- Music by: Udara Samaraweera
- Distributed by: MPI Theaters
- Release date: 5 April 2019
- Country: Sri Lanka
- Language: Sinhala

Iskoleta Man Awa (Sinhala: ඉස්කෝලෙට මං ආවා) is a 2019 Sri Lankan Sinhala children's drama film directed by Prasad Samarathunga and produced by Sandun Dolamulla. It stars Udith Abeyrathna, Kumara Wanduressa and Edna Sugathapala in lead roles along with Rajitha Hiran and Upul Weerasinghe. Child artist Viraj Madushan plays the main protagonist. Music composed by Udara Samaraweera. It is the 1328th Sri Lankan film in the Sinhala cinema.

The film is notable for starring veteran actress Edna Sugathapala, who returned to film after a decade-long hiatus/retirement. Sugathapala died in May 2018, prior to the film's premiere.

The film has only one song, sung by Kusal Weeramanthri with lyrics by Sankha Samarappuli.

== Plot ==
Sukiri is a helpless boy. He lives with his grandmother. At one point he sneaks into the school at a time when he can no longer control that desire. Eventually the school disciplinary teacher captures Sukiri and takes it to the principal.

When the principal hears Sukiri's details, he feels sorry for him. So the principal tells Sukiri to come with a guardian. Sukiri immediately comes looking for her grandmother. But the end has not yet stopped the search for Sukiri. All his hopes were dashed when he saw his grandmother die of a heart attack the same day. He begins to make a living by selling solitary candy books. Meanwhile, he accidentally meets the school principal on the road.

Sukira's fate changes at that moment. Recognizing him, the principal brings Sukiri to his house. The principal treats Sukiri like a child. That was due to the loss of children to his family. However, the principal's wife, Sukiri, is also abusive and blames the principal.

Someone in this house is special to Sukiri. She is the mother of the principal's wife. Her hands are paralyzed from a rare disease. Sukiri remembers his grandmother every time she sees him. The principal's wife's mother is worried about her hands becoming paralyzed. That's where Sukiri's hidden talents begin to emerge.

With the help of the principal, Sukiri develops his knowledge and begins to develop a device that can restore the hands of the principal's wife's mother. It's a joke to others in the house, but Sukiri does not stop. As a result, Sukiri is involved in an unforeseen event. Eventually he has to go to a place he never expected.

== Cast ==
- Viraj Madhushan Sukiri
  - Udith Abeyrathne as grown-up Sukiri
- Kumara Wanduressa as School Principal Dahanayake
- Edna Sugathapala as Principal's mother
- Rajitha Hiran as Banda
- Roshana Ondaatje as Principal's wife
- Upul Weerasinghe as Hapuwa
- Theja Nadeeshani as Teacher
- Samanthi Lanerole as Granny
- Rohan Paul as Doctor
- Jayatissa Athulasiri as Disciplinary teacher
- Jagath Apaladeniya as Book shop worker
- Aruna Dhammika
- Thiraj Dewmina
- Shayni Rochana as Announcer
- Kusal Weeramanthri
- Denura Weerasinghe
- Nimna Warshana
