= Kahaani Ghar Ghar Kii =

Indian Hindi television series

- Genre: Soap opera Family drama
- Created by: Ekta Kapoor
- Developed by: Anjna Sood
- Written by: Anil Nagpal; Nitin Goswami; Dialogue: Dheeraj Sarna; Sharad Tripathi; Amal Donwaar; Deepti Rawal; Shashi R.Singh
- Screenplay by: Sonali Jaffar; Anand Gandhi; Mahesh Pandey; Vincent Varghese; Rajesh Saksham
- Story by: Mushtaq Sheikh
- Directed by: Partho Mitra; Anil V. Kumar; Swapnil Mahaling
- Creative directors: Prashant Bhatt; Swapna Waghmare Joshi; Mitu Kumar; Nishchal Shome; Sandiip Sikcand; Nivedita Basu; Sanchi Bawa
- Starring: See below
- Opening theme: "Kahaani Ghar Ghar Kii" by Priya Bhattacharya
- Country of origin: India
- Original language: Hindi
- No. of episodes: 1,661

Production
- Producers: Ekta Kapoor; Shobha Kapoor
- Cinematography: Anil Mishra; Deepak Malwankar; Sukhvinder Singh; Sanjay Memane; Balu Dahifale
- Editors: Vikas Sharma; Nishit Shah; Mohd. Salim; Rochak Arora
- Running time: 24 minutes
- Production company: Balaji Telefilms

Original release
- Network: StarPlus
- Release: 16 October 2000 – 9 October 2008

Kahaani Ghar Ghar Kii (transl. The story of each household) is an Indian soap opera which ran on Star Plus from 16 October 2000 to 9 October 2008. One of the longest running Indian television soap opera, the series was created by Ekta Kapoor and produced by her company Balaji Telefilms, starring Sakshi Tanwar and Kiran Karmarkar in the lead roles.

The show explored the lives of Parvati and Om Agarwal, members of a Marwari joint family. Parvati is portrayed as the ideal daughter-in-law of the Agarwal family, while Om is depicted as the ideal son. The story revolves around Vishwanath Agarwal’s sons and their descendants.

The show also featured Ali Asgar as Kamal Agarwal, Anup Soni as Suyash Mehra, and Shweta Kawatra / Achint Kaur as Pallavi Agarwal in significant supporting roles. Kahaani Ghar Ghar Kii consistently ranked among the top three Indian television shows during its run.

== Plot ==
The show is based mostly on the lives and struggles within a joint family. The story, spread over three generations, focuses mainly on Parvati, who is married to Om, and her journey as the ideal wife, daughter-in-law, mother, and grandmother. It depicts how sometimes one must stand against their loved ones to do what is morally right. The story ends on the day of Dussehra with the family celebrating and highlighting the triumph of good over evil.

It all begins with the happy Agarwal family. Vishwanath Agarwal comments on how he has always treated the daughters and daughters-in-law of the house with the same love and respect. He gives his oldest daughter-in-law, Parvati, his "mala". She says that she doesn’t think she should receive it, but he insists, saying that he thinks of her as the cord that goes through the chain holding all the beads together.

These happy times are soon disrupted when Vishwanath’s third son, Ajay Agarwal, refuses to marry the daughter of reputed businessman Mr. Bhandari. Babuji tells Ajay that he can either marry Pallavi Bhandari or leave the Agarwal house for good. Ajay opts to leave and, in a time of turmoil, Kamal steps forward to save the family and Pallavi from humiliation by agreeing to marry her.

The day Pallavi enters the house, Parvati is busy shifting a glass structure from one place to another. Pallavi walks in, and both collide. The structure collapses, shattering into a million pieces. Pallavi smiles secretly, hoping that from this day forth, whatever goes wrong in the house will go wrong because of her.

Pallavi begins her venomous attack on the Agarwals and makes Parvati’s life a living hell. Soon, due to Pallavi’s conspiracies, Parvati, Om, and Shruti leave the house. Before long, however, Parvati and Chhaya run their own conspiracy against Pallavi, who is eventually caught red-handed. Chhaya reveals that she and Parvati planned everything so the family could see Pallavi’s true nature. Kamal later leaves Pallavi at her father’s house, saying that’s where she belongs. Parvati and Om return home and are finally happy again, but Parvati later brings Pallavi back, saying that family must always stay together.

Time goes on, and Om brings home his friend’s blind daughter, Khushi Kantilal Shah, after her father passes away. The family vows to take care of her. However, on the night of her celebration party, she is raped. Parvati discovers that Om’s cousins, Devin and Rohan Garg, are responsible. Unfortunately, the men of the family believe Devin and Rohan, and Ajay even fights the case for them.

During the court case, Parvati motivates Avantika to continue fighting for justice, reminding her that when one must choose between “Dharma” and “Karma,” one’s actions (Karma) define their true Dharma. Eventually, Anamika produces a letter from Devin confessing to the crime, and Devin and Rohan are sentenced.

Not long after, Pallavi takes her revenge and throws the family out. Living in poverty, Om suffers a nervous breakdown. In desperation, Parvati begs Pallavi for money, appearing to surrender to her. Pallavi, unaware of Parvati’s plan, accepts her back. Parvati secretly works with Chhaya to regain the family’s honor, but when exposed, no one believes her, and she leaves the house heartbroken. Eventually, Om brings her back, and the family reconciles.

Twenty years later, Kamal’s son Krishna returns from abroad, and Shruti falls in love with Aryan Doshi. On the day of Shruti’s wedding, Parvati discovers that Monalika is carrying Aryan’s child. After a series of events involving face transplants, mistaken identities, and family conflicts, Parvati’s identity is revealed, and the family briefly reunites.

Later, new characters such as Sasha, Machan, Neel, and Rob (the Gargs) enter the story, claiming inheritance rights. The Agarwals lose everything, and Krishna’s reckless decisions worsen their downfall. Om’s extramarital affair with Trishna, his tragic death, and Parvati’s revenge against Suyash Mehra further twist the narrative.

Eventually, it’s revealed that Trishna and Rajeshwari were behind Om and Krishna’s deaths. Parvati is framed and imprisoned. Before leaving, she advises her granddaughter Pragati to take care of the family.

After twenty years, Trishna controls the Agarwal household, tormenting everyone. A new woman, Jhanki Devi — identical to Parvati — arrives. Over time, it is revealed that Jhanki is Parvati herself, who survived and returned to restore justice. She exposes Trishna, reunites with Om (who had survived but lost his memory), and reclaims peace for the family.

In the end, good triumphs over evil — Trishna is arrested, Om and Parvati reunite, misunderstandings are cleared, and the Agarwal family returns to happiness, with Parvati watching over them once again.

== Cast ==
- Sakshi Tanwar as Parvati Om Agarwal / Parvati Suyash Mehra / Janki Devi / Swati Dixit / Ambika Sharma
- Kiran Karmarkar as Om Vishwanath Agarwal / Rishabh Rai Choudhary
- Mohnish Behl / Anup Soni as Suyash Mehra
- Shweta Kawatra / Achint Kaur as Pallavi Bhandari / Pammi Balraj Nanda
- Lily Patel as Rukmani Kedarnath Agarwal / Dadi
- Jyotsna Karyekar as Nani
- Deepak Qazir as Vishwanath Kedarnath Agarwal / Babuji
- Nayan Bhatt as Krishna Vishwanath Agarwal / Maaji
- Neelam Mehra as Vandana / Vandy Masi
- Aruna Irani as Narayani Devi
- Ali Asgar as Kamal Vishwanath Agarwal
- Tina Parekh as Shruti Sameer Kaul
  - Shweta Basu Prasad as young Shruti Om Agarwal
- Naveeda Mehdi as Khushi
- Sachin Sharma / Sameer Sharma as Krishna Kamal Agarwal
- Poorva Gokhale / Rujuta Deshmukh / Pallavi Subhash Chandran as Advocate Gunn Krishna Agarwal
- Malavika Shivpuri as Mansi Garg
- Aamir Ali / Mazher Sayed as Sameer Kaul
- Abhay Vakil / Bobby Bhonsale as Parth
- Mita Vashisht as Trishna Kamal Agarwal
- Deepak Bajaj as Nikhil Mehra
- Smita Bansal as Nivedita Kamal Agarwal (dead)
- Ananya Khare / Rajeshwari Sachdev / Tisca Chopra as Ambika Sharma / Mallika Sanjay Doshi
- Romanchak Arora / Sandeep Rajora as Neeraj Vishwanath Agarwal
- Aparna Jaywant as Mitali Vishwanath Agarwal
- Kapil Soni as Vishal Oberoi
- Sheetal Thakkar as Preeti Vishal Oberoi
- Kiran Dubey as Rajeshwari Suyash Mehra
- Jaya Seal as Swati Dixit
- Rinku Dhawan as Chhaya Vikram
- Abdul Shaibaz as young Suyash Mehra
- Manav Gohil / Prakash Ramchandani as Vikram
- Gautam Chaturvedi as Gaurav Vishwanath Agarwal
- Neelam Sagar / Surbhi Tiwari / Suchita Trivedi / Jaya Mathur as Shilpa Gaurav Agarwal
- Rajeev Paul as Deven Garg
- Karishma Randhawa / Addite Shirwaikar Malik / Arunima Sharma as Sonu / Sunaina Mehta
- Prabhat Bhattacharya as Advocate Ajay Vishwanath Agarwal
- Kusumit Sana / Sweta Keswani / Nivedita Bhattacharya as Avantika Ajay Agarwal
- Manish Goel as Tushar
- Smita Kalpavriksha as Sonali Tushar
- Priya Wal as Aditi Agarwal
- Aashish Kaul as Rohan Garg
- Alihassan Turabi as Aryan Sanjay Doshi
- Kavita Kaushik as Manya Doshi
- Samar Jai Singh as Harpreet Gill
- Amit Rampal as Sanjog Harpreet Gill
- Gargi Sharma as Gurbani Harpreet Gill
- Lucky Raajput as Manohar
- Shabbir Ahluwalia as Saumil Umesh Dixit
- Chetan Hansraj as Shashank (Sasha) Garg
- Reena Kapoor as Srishti
- Kanika Maheshwari as Neelima Garg
- Diwakar Pundir as Sambhav Khanna
- Rupali Ganguly as Gayatri Om Agarwal
- Tannaz Irani as Mita
- Shivangi Sharma as Gauri Ishaan Kaul
- Adita Wahi / Preeti Gupta as Mayuri Shikhar Mehra
- Rohit Bakshi as Shikhar Suyash Mehra
- Archana Bhatt Malkani as Pragati Agarwal / Pragati Akash Sharma
- Jeetu Malkani / Nivaan Sen as Pranay Kaul
- Shalini Chandran as Maithili Pranay Kaul
- Jatin Shah as Vikramaditya (Adi) Mehra
- Shraddha Musale / Praneeta Sahu as Malishka
- Akshita Kapoor as Tanu Kaul
- Urmila Tiwari as Sunaina Rai Chaudhary
- Parul Juneja as Neha Varun Mehta
- Varun Khandelwal as Varun Mehta
- Gaurav Gupta as Ronit Agarwal
- Ali Merchant as Bharat Agarwal
- Mandar Degvekar as Tiny Agarwal
- Barsha Chatterjee as Shivangi Ishaan Kaul
- Suhaas Ahuja as Sharath Raj Nanda / Sissy
- Panchi Bora as Prachi Mishra (guest appearance)
- Madhura Naik as Tanya Nanda / Sam
- Rocky Verma as Manager Waghale
- Sanjeet Bedi as Advocate Kothari
- Shraddha Nigam as Advocate Ambika
- Garima Bhatnagar as Garima Rai Chaudhary
- Mukul Dev as Vijay Agarwal
- Hrishikesh Pandey as Advocate Natkarni
- Anang Desai as Balraj Nanda
- Tarana Raja as Siri
- Sai Ballal as Avantika's father
- Salim Shah as Inspector Krishna Kanth (K.K.)
- Sushmita Mukherjee as Romilla Nanda
- Shubhavi Choksey as Advocate Rishika Rai Chaudhary
- Rajeev Bharadwaj / Karan Patel as Vigyaat Agarwal
- Puneet Vashisht as Viraj Agarwal
- Harsh Chhaya as Sandeep Sickand
- Poonam Joshi as Chhavi
- Surekha Sikri
- Jayati Bhatia as Dr. Shweta
- Kundan Waghmare
- Vivek Mushran as Bhushan Kaul
- Bharat Chawda as Ishaan / Chotu
  - Arnab Guha as young Ishaan / Chotu
- Manasi Varma as Monalika Agarwal
- Kwaljeet Singh as Machan Garg
- Raj Singh Arora as ACP Ashutosh Suyash Mehra / Ashutosh Parvati Mehra / Ashu
- Rituraj Singh as Sanjay Doshi
- Sikandar Kharbanda as Yash Garg
- Indira Krishnan as Anjana Harpreet Gill
- Bhuvnesh Mann as Ankit / Akash Sharma
- Sanjeev Tyagi as Mr. Malhotra

=== Cameo appearances ===
- Shweta Tiwari as Prerna
- Sara Khan as Sadhna
- Parul Chauhan as Ragini
- Sanaya Irani as Gunjan
- Arjun Bijlani as Mayank
- Aditi Bhagwat as Ashlesha

== Production ==
=== Development ===
Initially, Kahanii was offered to Zee TV. However, when they declined the offer, it was picked up by Star Plus.

Sakshi Tanwar was initially offered the role of a sister in law Parvati by Ekta Kapoor while playing the role of a sister in law in Karam which she rejected as she thought her role of a sister in law could not be the lead. Even when she was given narration of the story she rejected again as it required her to play the role of a mother to a teenager. Then, when Kapoor reduced the age of the characters in story by ten years, Tanwar rejected again as she was not willing to shift from Delhi to Mumbai for her daily soap shooting considering her routine would become affected. After discussions with Kapoor she decided to shoot for 15 days in Mumbai in a month for it so that the other days she could stay in Delhi.

When the ratings of the series slightly declined, Kapoor decided and on 15 November 2006, the story took a generation leap of 18 years.

=== Filming ===
Kahaani was initially shot at sets of Balaji House in Andheri. Then, in January 2003 it was shifted to Sankraman Studio, studio number eight A at Goregaon and later changed into killick nixion studio set number 6. In September 2007, due to the dipping viewership, considering the current set location unlucky and the previous set Sankraman lucky, Kapoor decided and shifted it back there. Some sequences of the series was also shot at foreign locations in Australia.

=== Crossover ===
On 19 June 2006, Kahaani had a crossover with Kkavyanjali. In 2007 and 2008, the series had a crossover with Kyunki Saas Bhi Kabhi Bahu Thi.

== Reception ==
=== Critical reception ===
The series was critically acclaimed during its premiere for showcasing the concept of an actual joint family and the challenges faced by the newer generations within such a system. The way in which the storyline was presented was widely appreciated.

When the series ended, The Telegraph highlighted both the positive and negative aspects of the show, stating: "A by and large credible storyline and identifiable characters. Unlike Tulsi, Parvati, played by Sakshi Tanwar, was human and vulnerable, and that endeared her to viewers. Repetitive plot points and too many characters towards the end — the Agarwal family plunged from one crisis to another; the viewer plunged from boredom to frustration."

=== Ratings ===
The series, which aired in the night slot of 10:00 pm (IST), is regarded as the second-highest-rated Indian soap opera after Kyunki Saas Bhi Kabhi Bahu Thi, which dominated the top positions in Hindi GECs for about seven years. Kahaani Ghar Ghar Kii started with a TRP of 1.1 in 2000. Following the early success of Kyunki Saas Bhi Kabhi Bahu Thi, Kahaani Ghar Ghar Kii rose in popularity, helping StarPlus and Balaji Telefilms achieve greater reach at that time.

Three weeks after its premiere, the show ranked among the top three on Indian television, alongside Kyunki Saas Bhi Kabhi Bahu Thi and Kaun Banega Crorepati.

The series became one of the most-watched shows during 2001 and 2002, averaging over 10 TVR. In week 24 of 2002, it was the second-most-watched Hindi GEC with 10.41 TVR, and the following week, it climbed to the top spot with 9.03 TVR, overtaking Kyunki.

In September 2003, the series took an 18-year leap in the storyline, and ratings spiked to over 10 TVR from around 9 TVR before the leap.

During 2002 and 2003, the series consistently trailed only Kyunki Saas Bhi Kabhi Bahu Thi, maintaining the number two spot on Indian television.

In 2004, following its first generational leap of 20 years, the show achieved TRPs as high as 18+, a feat matched only by Kyunki Saas Bhi Kabhi Bahu Thi, which once reached 22+. In the same year, the "rape hearing" sequence helped the series top the charts for several consecutive weeks.

On 15 November 2006, the series underwent another 18-year leap when ratings had begun to decline. The protagonist Parvati Agarwal, played by Sakshi Tanwar, returned from the dead as Janki Devi to avenge Trishna (Mita Vashisht), who had destroyed her family. The storyline was praised for its bold contemporary theme. An episode soon after the leap garnered 15.34 TVR — the show’s highest since its 12.55 TVR in January 2006. The first post-leap episode on 15 November 2006 achieved over 12 million viewers.

Sakshi Tanwar was applauded for her transformation into Janki Devi, marking a major shift after playing Parvati for six years. Vashisht was also praised for her portrayal of antagonist Trishna. The ratings again rose following Tanwar’s comeback.

By early 2008, the show maintained a TRP between 4 and 5 while staying among the top-rated programs. However, ratings soon declined to between 2 and 2.5, and by September 2008, Kahaani recorded just 0.8. On the week ending 4 October 2008, it garnered 2.41 TVR, ranking ninth. Due to the consistent decline in ratings, the series went off air on 9 October 2008.

At one point, when the TVR dropped by just one point, Kapoor became furious and reportedly considered shutting down the show. The cast and crew reshot upcoming sequences for 16 hours straight until she was satisfied.

The series concluded on 9 October 2008 after completing eight successful years. In the final episode, the protagonist Sakshi Tanwar was shown passing the baton to Puja Banerjee, the lead actress of Tujh Sang Preet Lagai Sajna, which replaced Kahaani Ghar Ghar Kii on StarPlus.

=== Impact ===
Protests were evoked by Jagori, a women's group, in May 2002 for the depiction of the rape of a blind girl Khushi, where the rapist justifies the crime as punishment for not respecting him, in the episode aired on 21 May 2002.

In February 2003, The Times of India reported that people had started recreating the grand sets of the series in their homes in Kolkata.

In June 2008, a sequence was reported to be inspired by the ongoing 2008 Noida double murder case, where the lead character Parvati's granddaughter Tanu, played by Akshita Kapoor, and her boyfriend Andy were to be murdered. The victim's mother, Nupur Talwar, requested the National Commission for Protection of Child Rights (NCPCR) to stop Balaji Telefilms from airing the sequence, saying that the production house was trying to earn TRPs by exploiting a tragedy.

However, the production house refused to change the script, stating that the sequence was not inspired by the case, although there were similarities reported between both. Mumbai Mirror reported the following similarities: “The body of Tanu's boyfriend is found inside the house just as the body of the servant was found on the terrace in Aarushi's case. In the show, as in reality, Tanu's ashes will be immersed in Haridwar, just like Aarushi's. Also, the drama will focus on a family member's involvement in the murder. Like Aarushi's mother, Parvati will be shown giving interviews to the media. The show has also incorporated the element of the MMS and the CBI probe into the case.”

When Balaji Telefilms refused to drop the track, NCPCR member Sandhya Bajaj, after Talwar's complaint, wrote to the Information & Broadcasting (I&B) Secretary Asha Swarup stating, “Balaji Telefilms’ move would glorify the concept of ‘honour killings’. They should not be allowed to make a serial on the Aarushi murder case till the investigations are over. Otherwise, it will amount to influencing the investigation and the outcome of the case.”

Following the complaint and a meeting between the I&B ministry and Star TV, they ordered Star to withhold the episode telecast. Star then instructed Balaji Telefilms, as per the I&B directive, to alter the track accordingly. Soon, the storyline was modified, regarding which Creative Head Nivedita Basu stated: "Well, Andy will not die; only Tanu will be bumped off. So there is no double murder like that of Aarushi and Hemraj. Moreover, we also removed the word 'honour killing' from the episode. Now the track will be of a 'who-dun-it', where every character in the Agarwal family will be a suspect."

=== Broadcast ===
Due to popular demand, the show had a re-run from August 2022 on the same network.

== Adaptations ==
Language	Title	Original release	Network(s)	Last aired	Notes
Marathi	Gharo Ghari Matichya Chuli घरोघरी मातीच्या चुली	18 March 2024	Star Pravah	Ongoing	Remake
Tamil	Veetuku Veedu Vaasapadi வீட்டுக்கு வீடு வாசப்படி	22 April 2024	Star Vijay	15 February 2025	Remake
Kannada	Janaki Samsara ಜಾನಕಿ ಸಂಸಾರ	6 May 2024	Star Suvarna	21 September 2024	Remake
Telugu	Intinti Ramayanam ఇంటింటి రామాయణం	10 June 2024	Star Maa	4 July 2026	Remake
Malayalam	Janakiyudeyum Abhiyudeyum Veedu ജാനകിയുടെയും അഭിയുടെയും വീട്	17 June 2024	Asianet	31 October 2025	Remake

== Awards ==
Year	Award	Category	Recipient	Role
2002	Indian Telly Awards	Best Actor in Lead Role	Kiran Karmarkar	Om Aggarwal
2002	Indian Telly Awards	Best Actress in Lead Role	Sakshi Tanwar	Parvati Aggarwal
2002	Indian Telly Awards	Best Actress in Negative Role	Shweta Kawatra	Pallavi Aggarwal
2002	Indian Telly Awards	Best Drama Series	Ekta Kapoor	
2006	Indian Television Academy Awards	Best Actor in Supporting Role	Ali Asgar	Kamal Aggarwal
2008	Indian Television Academy Awards	Best Actor in Supporting Role	Ali Asgar	Kamal Aggarwal
2010	Indian Television Academy Awards	ITA Milestone Award	Deepak Qazir Kejriwal; Kiran Karmarkar; Sakshi Tanwar; Ali Asgar; Chetan Hansraj	Vishwanath Aggarwal; Om Aggrawal; Parvati Aggrawal; Kamal Aggarwal; Sasha

== See also ==
- Janakiyudeyum Abhiyudeyum Veedu
