= Do Dooni Chaar =

2010 Indian film by Habib Faisal

- Theatrical release poster
- Directed by: Habib Faisal
- Screenplay by: Habib Faisal; Rahil Qazi
- Story by: Habib Faisal
- Produced by: Arindam Chaudhuri
- Starring: Rishi Kapoor; Neetu Kapoor
- Cinematography: Anshuman Mahaley
- Edited by: Aarti Bajaj
- Music by: Meet Bros Anjjan; Ankit Tiwari
- Production companies: Walt Disney Pictures; Planman Motion Pictures; Walt Disney Pictures India
- Distributed by: Walt Disney Studios Motion Pictures
- Release date: 8 October 2010
- Running time: 108 minutes
- Country: India
- Language: Hindi

Do Dooni Chaar (transl. Two twos are four) is a 2010 Indian Hindi-language family comedy-drama film produced by Arindam Chaudhuri (Planman Motion Pictures), written and directed by debutant director Habib Faisal, starring Rishi Kapoor, Neetu Kapoor, Aditi Vasudev and Archit Krishna in lead roles. The film is about a middle-class school teacher who tries to keep his wife and children happy in inflationary times and dreams of buying a car. The film also marks the return of the Kapoor pair as a lead couple on the silver screen. Although the duo had not acted in a film in over 30 years, they had previously acted in numerous hits during the 1970s. The directorial debut film was also the first live-action Hindi film to be distributed by Walt Disney Pictures. It went on to win the National Film Award for Best Feature Film in Hindi at the 58th National Film Awards.

== Plot ==
The Duggals are a middle-class Punjabi family living in a one-bedroom apartment in Lajpat Nagar, Delhi. The middle-aged patriarch, Santosh Duggal, is a modest high-school mathematics teacher; his wife Kusum is a stay-at-home housewife who quit her job at Santosh's insistence. They have two teenage children: a tomboyish college-going daughter, Payal, who narrates the film, and a high-schooler son, Sandeep, who is also known as Deepu or Sandy. They lead a hand-to-mouth existence, penny-pinching at every opportunity. Santosh commutes using a dilapidated old scooter, nicknamed "Duggal Express", from his home to the school and to a coaching centre, where he gains a supplementary income. Despite his best efforts to give his children a quality education, he always falls short of their expectations, who wish for a comfortable life despite their situation.

One evening, Santosh receives a phone call from his sister Urmi, who informs him that her youngest nanad (sister-in-law) is getting married at their home in Meerut that weekend. This throws the children's plans of buying gadgets out the window, as their meagre budget is now further strained with the burden of travelling to Meerut and buying gifts for the groom's family. The following night, Urmi turns up at the Duggals', and entreats the family to arrive at the marriage by car at any cost; if they show up on the scooter, she will have to face taunts from her family. Santosh immediately says that this is impossible, since he does not have the finances to borrow a car, let alone to buy one. However, Kusum promises a distraught Urmi that they will go to the marriage in a car, no matter what the expense.

After a fellow teacher at school proposes renting a car to Meerut, but at too high a price, Santosh turns to his jovial neighbour Farooqui, who offers the Duggals his old Maruti Esteem. Payal drives the family to Meerut without incident. The marriage is a success, and Urmi's family is pleased to see the Duggals. However, upon returning home, Payal reverses the car into a wall, damaging its rear bumper and tail-light. Farooqui is unperturbed by the damage expenses, but his wife Salma loses her temper and challenges the Duggals to buy a car. Despite himself, Santosh takes up the challenge, and vows to buy a new car within fifteen days.

Farooqui sympathises with Santosh and advises him to buy only a new car and not a secondhand car. Santosh visits a car dealership and is offered a Maruti Alto with an attractive offer, but he has to buy the car within five days to avail of the offer. Payal is displeased with the choice of car, as she wanted something more modern like her boyfriend's Hyundai i10. She refuses to accompany her family for the Alto's test drive, and eventually applies for a job at a call centre. Meanwhile, Deepu, who had been betting money on cricket matches, is shell-shocked when the betting ring is exposed and arrested; he destroys his mobile phone, to his girlfriend's consternation. That night, an exuberant Payal tells Santosh about her new job's offer letter, but he is unhappy with his daughter sacrificing her education for some extra money. In a fit of rage, Payal tears up her offer letter, but then the family learns of the betting ring through a TV news report. Payal and Kusum are enraged, but Santosh is calm. He takes Deepu to distribute the betting money among street children.

Having been refused a loan by both a schoolteacher and the coaching centre's owner, Santosh is at his wits' end to pay the car's down payment. In desperation, he buys a thousand packets of 555 Brand detergent, in the hope that he gets to win a car through a lucky coupon found in one of the packets. The family spends considerable time ripping open cartons, cutting through packets and fishing out coupons, but the grand prize eludes them. Santosh then chances upon an answer paper of one of his students', wherein the student requests him to award him at least passing marks; in return, for each mark awarded, Santosh will receive one thousand rupees. Santosh and Kusum had seen the paper earlier but had brushed it aside; now Kusum wonders whether they are doing the right thing, but Santosh reassures her that, in a fast-paced, burgeoning Delhi where his students get high-starting salaries, an aging teacher deserves at least a matchbox-sized car. Santosh and Payal proceed to a McDonald's restaurant, where the student's father has arranged to meet them along with him, his grandfather and his uncle. Meanwhile, Deepu is convinced, through another sting operation report on TV, that his father has fallen for a scam, and sets out alone for the restaurant.

The men sit across Santosh and Payal. The grandfather asks Santosh to show how many marks were awarded. Santosh is astounded to discover that the boy is his student Aryan. Just as Santosh is about to show the answer-sheet, Zafar Iqbal, an ex-student of his, arrives on the scene with his wife and small daughter, and thanks him for making him a successful person in life and a principled "good boy". Zafar tells Santosh that he and several other ex-students live in New York and recount memories of him. After he leaves, Santosh, clearly moved, refuses to take the money, telling Aryan that they will both have failed if he were to undeservedly pass him: Aryan for thinking that money can buy anything, and Santosh for being remembered for dishonesty. He is about to leave, when a furious Payal, on learning that Aryan had spray-painted lewd messages on Santosh's scooter, starts an uproarious fight between the Duggals (including Deepu, who has joined the scene) and Aryan's relatives. Both parties, splattered with sauce, flee the restaurant, with Aryan's SUV in hot pursuit of the "Duggal Express" as the latter speeds through the roads of Delhi.

The Duggals have only just reached home when their pursuers arrive at their street, asking for their address and creating a ruckus. Farooqui informs a nervous Santosh about their presence. The Duggals come down and start apologising to them; Deepu had even been convinced that they were running a sting operation. However, their fears are unfounded: the grandfather introduces himself as Popley, the proprietor of Popley Sweets, and offers the Duggals twelve months' advance tuition fees to supplement their glaringly inadequate teaching income, which they reluctantly accept. He requests Santosh to teach Aryan to be a morally good boy, unlike his two wastrel sons. Payal and Deepu are now more proud than ever that their father is a teacher. The film ends with the Duggals enjoying their new Maruti Alto; as Payal teaches Santosh to drive it, they lament that they are now stuck in traffic jams, whereas they would have simply squeezed through them with their scooter; of course, it is a small price for them to pay.

== Cast ==
- Rishi Kapoor as Santosh Duggal
- Neetu Kapoor as Kusum Duggal
- Aditi Vasudev as Payal Duggal, also the narrator of the film
- Archit Krishna as Sandeep Duggal (a.k.a. Deepu / Sandy)
- Rajesh Vivek as Anchor
- Akhilendra Mishra as Farooqui
- Supriya Shukla as Urmi (Fuppu)
- Natasha Rastogi as Salma Farooqui
- Mohit Chadda as Rahul
- Viccky Baidyanath as Policeman
- Manju Bahuguna as Teacher at school

== Production ==
=== Development ===
Even at the script development stage, Neetu Kapoor had been in the mind of the makers, for the female lead opposite Rishi Kapoor, initially Juhi Chawla was approached, she, however, refused the role. Although Neetu-Rishi pair had made a brief appearance in the Saif Ali Khan and Deepika Padukone starrer 2009 film Love Aaj Kal, Do Dooni Chaar was their first film as a lead pair, after a gap of 30 years as Neetu Kapoor had retired from film after her marriage to Rishi Kapoor in 1980. Later in an interview Neetu, revealed she had no intentions of signing on the film and agreed to listen to the script at the insistence of her husband, who has already been signed on. Upon hearing the script from the director Habib, she started imaging herself as "Kusum Duggal" and immediately agreed to the part.

=== Theme ===
The film deals with the issue of underpaid teachers, and their issue with their self-worth in the face of growing inflation and demands of their family. The middle-class school teacher who works overtime to support his income and to send his children to good schools ends up in a moral dilemma when it comes to fulfilling the needs of his ever unsatisfied teenage children. As per producer, Arindam Chaudhuri, "The common question the teacher asks when he looks at his student, who is just 25 and owns a car, is why at 55 he is still riding a scooter?" In the end, it is not just the teacher who redeems himself by not succumbing to taking bribes, but also his children who begin to see him in the true light and importance of being a teacher and an honest citizen.

=== Filming ===
Film was shot on locations across Delhi, in places like Kirori Mal College, Vinobapuri, Shalimar Bagh (Delhi), Khan Market, Chittaranjan Park, Mayur Vihar Phase - 3 and Noida. The wedding sequence in the film set in Meerut, was shot in a Chhattarpur farmhouse and later in Nizamuddin area, in early 2009. Coaching class shot in DICT Institute, Mayur vihar phase 3.

== Release ==
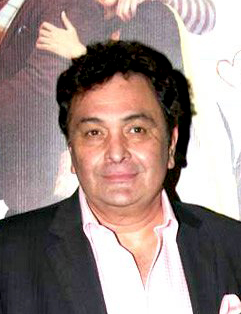
Lead actor Rishi Kapoor at the premiere of the film, in Mumbai

In August 2010, the film became the first live action Hindi feature film to be produced by Disney India and distributed by Walt Disney Studios Motion Pictures. The film premiered at a suburban theatre in Mumbai on 6 October, attended by the cast and Bollywood stars, followed by a nationwide release on 8 October 2010. The film had its North American premiere as the opening night film of the 2011 New York Indian Film Festival on 4 May 2011.

=== Home media ===
The film was released on Disney DVD, Movie Download, and On Demand on 26 July 2011. The release was produced in DVD widescreen and included a Hindi language track plus English subtitles.

== Reception ==
=== Critical reception ===
Anupama Chopra of NDTV called it, "a film with grace" and commended the film for its "inherent niceness and decency". Pratim D. Gupta of The Telegraph gave two thumbs up to the film calling it "an irresistible trip to the movies" that "makes you feel good about yourself". Mayank Shekhar of Hindustan Times giving 4/5 stars said, "Full on paisa vasool! Dig into the Duggals" while Sudhish Kamath of The Hindu called it "One of the most important films of our times. A celebration of the great Indian middle class. A landmark in indian film making!" Rajeev Masand of CNN-IBN also liked the movie saying "Do Dooni... is simple but lovable." Similarly veteran critic Taran Adarsh of Bollywood Hungama called it a "A little gem that should not be missed!" Vinayak Chakravorty of Mail Today gave it three stars, writing: "Debutant Habib Faisal's direction works for the way he underplays routine ironies of life." DNA also praised the film, saying, "Though the film carries underlying messages of honesty and respect for the noble profession of teaching, it does not sound preachy or demand sympathy for the protagonist family." Times Of India rated it 3 out of 5 and claimed it Sweet, simplistic and sensitive.

=== Box office ===
The film collected ₹45 million (US$470,000) in its theatrical run.

== Soundtrack ==
1. "Do Dooni Chaar" – Shankar Mahadevan, Vishal Dadlani
2. "Baaja Bajya" – Sunidhi Chauhan, Meet Bros Anjan Ankit
3. "Ek Haath De" – Meet Bros Anjan Ankit
4. "Maange Ki Ghodi" – Rakesh Pandit, Krishna
5. "Do Dooni Chaar" Jam – Shankar Mahadevan, Vishal Dadlani
6. "Do Dooni Chaar" Club Mix – Shankar Mahadevan, Vishal Dadlani, Meet Bros Anjjan, Ankit

== Awards ==
58th National Film Awards

- Best Hindi Feature film – Do Dooni Chaar

2011 Star Screen Awards

- Best Art Direction – Mukund Gupta

2011 Filmfare Awards

- Best Actor (Critics) – Rishi Kapoor
- Best Dialogue – Habib Faisal
- Best Costume Design – Varsha and Shilpa
- Best Production Design – Mukund Gupta
