= Pallavi Purohit =

Indian actress

- Born: Pallavi Subhash Chandran
- Occupation: Actress
- Years active: 2006–present
- Known for: Madhubala - Ek Ishq Ek Junoon

Pallavi Purohit is an Indian actress from Mumbai who has appeared in several TV shows since 2006, television commercials, Hindi, Malayalam and Kannada movies. Pallavi is best known for her key roles as Padmini in Madhubala – Ek Ishq Ek Junoon, Damini Verma in Malayalam movie Mr. Fraud opposite Mohanlal, Sangeetha in Malayalam movie Silence opposite Mammootty, Savita Pathare in Hindi movie Kaanchi opposite Mithun Chakraborty and, recently, as Smita in Kannada movie "Manasmita" opposite Atul Kulkarni.

== Early life ==
Her father is from Palakkad but she was brought up in Karnataka. Pallavi completed her Business Management and Hotel Management and began working with Oberoi Hotel in Bengaluru. She decided to give up the job and become an actress.

== Career ==
She has worked in several shows for Balaji Telefilms. She was selected for the role of Gayatri in the show Karam Apnaa Apnaa. Thereafter she played the role of Gunn on Kahaani Ghar Ghar Ki. She later replaced Arunima Sharma as one of the three female leads in the role of Rano in Zee TV's Kasamh Se. She played the role of Urvashi Sanghvi in Basera and has worked on other shows including Peehar (as Dr. Sara), Bajega Band Baaja (as Dilpreet), Paap Punya Ka Lekha Jokha, Sanskar, Raja Ki Aayegi Baraat and the TV series Sujata. She worked on Bairi Piya playing the part of Chiggy Bahu and later appeared in Jyoti in the role of Asha.

Pallavi played Rohini Patwardhan in Sapnon Se Bhare Naina and Padmini in Madhubala - Ek Ishq Ek Junoon. Pallavi quit the show after signing up for a lead role opposite Mammootty in V. K. Prakash directed Malayalam movie Silence. Simultaneously, she also worked in a Subhash Ghai directed movie Kaanchi. Thereafter, in 2014, she acted as one of the three lead heroines opposite Mohanlal in B. Unnikrishnan directed movie Mr. Fraud. She played Goddess Lakshmi in the Kannada show HaraHara Mahadev which was a remake of 'Devon ke dev: Mahadev'. She played the lead actress as "Smita", a classical dancer, in the Kannada movie "Manasmita" opposite Atul Kulkarni.

== Filmography ==
=== Film ===
Film	Year	Role	Paired With	Language	Notes
Silence	2013	Sangeetha	Mammootty	Malayalam	Debut Malayalam movie as female lead
Mr. Fraud	2014	Damini Verma	Mohanlal	Malayalam	As a female lead
Kaanchi	2014	Savita Pathare	Mithun Chakraborty	Hindi	Debut Bollywood movie
Manasmita	2022	Smita	Atul Kulkarni	Kannada	Debut Kannada movie as a female lead

=== Television ===
Show Name	Language	Role	Notes
Sati...Satya Ki Shakti	Hindi		TV Debut
Parrivaar	Hindi		
Sanskaar	Hindi		
Ssshhhh...Koi Hai	Hindi		
Paap Punya Ka Lekha Jokha	Hindi		
Santaan	Hindi		
Sujata	Hindi		
Man Mein Hai Visshwas	Hindi		
Karam Apnaa Apnaa	Hindi	Gayatri	
Kahaani Ghar Ghar Ki	Hindi	Gunn Krishna Agarwal	
Kasamh Se	Hindi	Rano	
Peehar	Hindi	Dr. Sara	
Raja Ki Aayegi Baraat	Hindi	Namki	
Bajega Band Baaja	Hindi	Dilpreet	
Basera	Hindi	Urvashi Sanghvi	
Bairi Piya	Hindi	Chiggy Bahu	
Jyoti	Hindi	Asha Sisodia	
Sapnon Se Bhare Naina	Hindi	Rohini Patwardhan	
Madhubala - Ek Ishq Ek Junoon	Hindi	Padmini Chaudhury	
HaraHara Mahadeva	Kannada	Lakshmi	
Do Duniya Ek Dil	Hindi	Pallavi Chauhan	

== Awards and nominations ==
Year	Award	Category	Show/Film	Role	Result
2012	Colors Golden Petal Awards 2012	Most Bhavuk Personality	Madhubala - Ek Ishq Ek Junoon	Padmini	Nominated
2013	Indian Telly Awards	Best Actor (Popular) in a Supporting Role 2012 - Female	Madhubala - Ek Ishq Ek Junoon	Padmini	Won
2013	6th Boroplus Gold Awards	Best Supporting Actor (Female)	Madhubala - Ek Ishq Ek Junoon	Padmini	Nominated
