= Silence (2013 film) =

2013 Indian Malayalam thriller film by V. K. Prakash

- Theatrical-release poster
- Directed by: V. K. Prakash
- Written by: Y. V. Rajesh
- Produced by: Afseena Saleem
- Starring: Mammootty; Anoop Menon; Pallavi Purohit; Joy Mathew; Jayaprakash Kuloor
- Cinematography: Manoj Kumar Khatoi
- Edited by: Mahesh Narayanan
- Music by: Ratheesh Vegha
- Production company: Aysha Films
- Distributed by: Aysha Films
- Release date: 7 December 2013
- Country: India
- Language: Malayalam

Silence, also known as The Power of Silence, is a 2013 Malayalam thriller film directed by V. K. Prakash and starring Mammootty, Anoop Menon, Pallavi Purohit, Joy Mathew and Jayaprakash Kuloor. The climax of the film is based on the 2011 South Korean courtroom thriller film The Client.

== Plot ==
Arvind Chandrasekhar, a very cunning lawyer is appointed judge in the Karnataka High Court. Happily living in Bangalore with his wife Sangeetha and their adorable children Arya and Aditya, the man has little to fret over. Before taking the oath, he visits his parents in Kerala. There he is harassed by threatening phone call from a veiled assailant who says he is not fit to be a judge. Arvind ignores the calls at first but things get serious when his wife and children face dangerous situations. The film narrates how he unveils the mystery with the help of his close friend Neil George, an IPS officer.

== Cast ==
- Mammootty as Advocate Arvind Chandrasekhar, later Judge
- Anoop Menon as DIG Neil George IPS, Bangalore City Police
- Pallavi Purohit as Sangeetha
- Joy Mathew as Markose
- Jayaprakash Kuloor as the priest
- Aparna Nair as Liji
- Sudheer Karamana as DYSP Sajan
- Romanch as Convict
- Basil Paulose as John
- Jinu Joy as Roy
- Ravi Vallathol
- Raghavan
- Prakash Bare as Commissioner
- Sreelatha Namboothiri
- Balachandran Chullikad
- Shankar Ramakrishnan
- P. Balachandran
- Sneha Nambiar

== Critical reception ==
Kiran Joseph JKV wrote in his review for Deccan Herald: "Started off well, never even half done, this Silence fades into oblivion, silently." Ajin Krishna of Oneindia.in rated the film 2/5 and said, "Silence fails to impress the viewers as a thriller flick, which is the basic purpose of such movies." Paresh C Palicha of Rediff.com rated the film 2.5/5 and said, "Silence is the first attempt at serious film making from the writer-director team of Y V Rajesh and V K Prakash after low-brow comedies such as Gulumaal and Three Kings. It is notches above the previous attempts and highly watchable." However the reviewer felt that the film "borrows heavily from the Richard Gere starrer, Primal Fear (1996)."
