= Yureni Noshika =

Sri Lankan actress and model

Yureni Noshika යුරේනි නොෂිකා
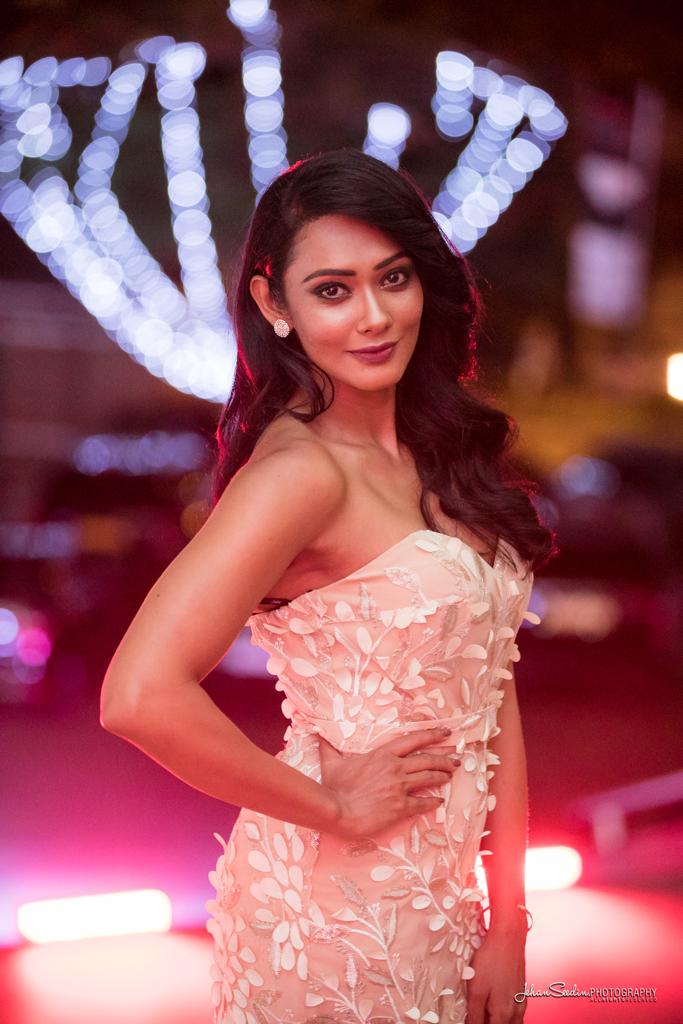
- Noshika at the 15th Raigam Tele'es Awards ceremony
- Born: Yureni Noshika Gunasekara; January 29, 1984 (age 42); Borella, Sri Lanka
- Education: Methodist College
- Occupations: Actress; model
- Years active: 2007–present
- Notable work: Koombiyo
- Website: www.yureninoshika.lk

Yureni Noshika Gunasekara (born 12 December 1984) is an actress in Sri Lankan cinema and television as well as a singer and media personality. Noshika began her career winning the Miss Sri Lanka for Miss World contest and went on to commercials before making it in the television and movie industries.

== Early life ==
Noshika was born in Borella Sri Lanka as the only child in the family. Raised Christian, she studied at Methodist College in Colombo. Noshika was gaining qualifications to follow a career in law but this is currently on hold due to her acting obligations.

== Career ==
Yureni Noshika worked as a call center operator at Dialog Axiata earlier in her career. Noshika won the "Models of the New Generation" pageant hosted by Derana TV in 2006, and went on to represent Sri Lanka at the Tourism World contest. Her potential for acting and musical talents were evident and she decided to follow a career in these fields, opting out of following a law career, which was her next preferred choice. After appearing in the TV commercials for Coca-Cola and Nestlé among many others, she was picked to appear in the teledrama Kindurangana, which was a remake for the Sri Lanka television market of the Hindi television serial Kasam Se. This was a joint venture between Balaji Telefilms of India and the Maharaja organisation of Sri Lanka.

Subsequently, she has appeared in many TV serials such as Kindurangana, Sanda Sakki, Arora, Sihina Sindrella, Ayal, and Pingaladanauwwa among others. Noshika entered the movie industry in 2009 and was immediately cast into one of the lead roles in the film Nino Live. The movie went on to gain both critical acclaim and commercial success. Moreover, she also won the best supporting actress award in Raigam Tele'es.

She entered the music industry in 2015 with Saree Pote and has released her second single Chewing Gum (Wage Kollo) in 2017. She also guest starred in the film Rush and played the lead role in Kasun Pathirana's debut film Knight Rider as her third cinema appearance.

== Other activities ==
Noshika has her own regular fitness column in the Daily News. Following her success and the experience gained thereafter, Noshika was selected to be a judge for the Miss Sri Lanka Online contest in 2012.

== Personal life ==
Noshika is part of the Japanese Mahikari new cult movement.

== Reality shows & competitions ==
Year	Title	Result
2008	Sirasa Dancing Stars	Top 10
2017	Hiru Mega Star	Grand Winner

== Television appearances ==
- Kindurangana (2009)
- Ayal (2009)
- Pingala Danawwa (2009)
- Sihina Cinderella (2010)
- Piyavi (2012)
- Koombiyo (2017)

== Filmography ==
Year	Title	Role	Notes	Ref.
2015	Pravegaya	Item song		
2017	Nino Live	Nunu1		
2019	Rush	Christina		
2022	Night Rider	Shani Sooriyabandara		
2023	Gajaman	Sweetie (voice)		
2023	Teddy	Vihara		

== Discography ==
Singles as lead artist

Title	Year
Saree Pote	2015
Chewing Gum Wage Kollo	2017

== Beauty pageants ==
Year	Event	Result
2006	Miss Sri Lanka for Miss Tourism World	Won
2006	Models of the New Generation	Won

== Awards and accolades ==
Year	Award	Category	Result
2015	Raigam Tele'es	Most Popular Actress	Nominated
2015	Sumathi Awards	Most Popular Actress	Nominated
2015	Derana Music Video Awards	Best Dance Video	Won
2016	Sumathi Awards	Most Popular Actress	Nominated
2018	Derana Sunsilk Film Awards	Most Popular Actress	Won
2018	Derana Sunsilk Film Awards	Social Media Personality of the Year	Won
2018	Sarasaviya Film Awards	Best Supporting Actress	Won
2019	Raigam Tele'es 2018	Best Supporting Actress	Nominated
2019	19th Presidential Cinema Awards	Best Upcoming Actress	Won
2019	Sumathi Tele Awards	Jury Special Award (for Koombio)	Won
2019	State Television Awards	Best Supporting Actress	Won
