= Kindurangana =

- කිඳුරංගනා
- Genre: Drama; Romance; Family
- Based on: Kasamh Se
- Starring: Chamalsha Dewmini; Yureni Noshika; Niranjala Jayasinghe; Ishan Gammudali; Akila Sandakalum; Rohani Weerasinghe
- Country of origin: Sri Lanka
- Original language: Sinhala
- No. of episodes: 481

Original release
- Network: Sirasa TV
- Release: 2007 – 2009

Kindurangana (English: Mermaids, සිංහල: කිඳුරංගනා) is a 2007 Sri Lankan drama television series telecast on Sirasa TV on 2007. This television series was inspired by Hindi soap opera "Kasamh Se".

== Plot ==
This story revolves around three girls who live in Nuwara Eliya with their father. After their father's death their lives become more complicated as their father requests them to meet Prathap Gajasinghe, a millionaire businessman in Colombo.

== Cast ==
=== Main ===
- Chamalsha Dewmini Rathnaweera as Nethra
- Yureni Noshika as Sanju
- Anjalee Thathsarani as Dinu

=== Supporting ===
- Ishan Gammudali as Prathap Gajasinghe
- Akila Sandakalum as Vihanga
- Rohani Weerasinghe as Rajini
- Thushitha Weerasinghe vs Randhir
- Cybil Dharmawardana
- Edna Sugathapala
- Ananda Athukorale
- Sanjeewa Illeperuma
- Nimal Yatiwella
- Ranil Suranga
- Antonio Punchihewa
- Poornima de Silva
- Chamini Nisansala Pereira

== Production ==
The drama was produced by Ekta Kapoor and Shobha Kapoor. This project is a co-production of Balaji Telefilms Ltd and Aquarians Entertainment Ltd. Executive producer of the drama is Frederick Dissanayake. The series was translated by Manjula Malkanthi.
