= Edna Sugathapala =

Sri Lankan actress, musician, and astrologer

Edna Sugathapala එඩ්නා සුගතපාල
- Born: Edna Kamala Yeromani; 3 January 1946; Gorakana, Panadura
- Died: 14 March 2018 (aged 72); Nawaloka Hospital
- Education: Good Shepherd Convent; Holy Family Convent
- Occupations: Actress, Singer, Astrologist
- Years active: 1966–2019

Edna Kamala Yeromani (born 3 January 1946 – died 14 March 2018 as එඩ්නා සුගතපාල) [Sinhala]), popularly known as Edna Sugathapala, was an actress in Sri Lankan cinema, theater and television. She is also a pianist, vocalist and astrologer. She is the only artiste in the Sri Lankan cinema who worked as a professional astrologer. She is best known for the roles in films Miringuwa, Senehasa and Tharanaya.

She died on 14 March 2018 while receiving treatments at Colombo Nawaloka Hospital. According to her wish, the body was handed over to a Medical College.

== Personal life ==
She was born on 3 January 1946 at Gorakana, Panadura. She completed her education from Good Shepherd Convent, Colombo and then from Holy Family Convent, Bambalapitiya. Her mother Swarna Mary Bernadeth was a film producer. Edna married on 28 February 1973. She has one daughter, Veena.

== Career ==
At very small age, Sugathapala acted with Late Rukmani Devi for the song Doy Doyya Putha in the film Daiwayogaya. She started her acting career through the play Gehenu Hatana produced by Dick Dias in 1966. Apart from acting, she played piano and accordion in the playback music for films Surayangeth Suraya and Me Desa Kumatada.

She started musical career at the age of 6. She graduated from Trinity College London examinations in piano. In 1978, Sugathapala released her first music album Veena. The songs were written by Karunaratne Abeysekera and music directed by Mohamed Sally. She also involved for duets sang with H.R. Jothipala. Sugathapala holds the record by being the only Sri Lankan actress to play as a professional musician in a musical orchestra in a film. Her maiden cinematic experience came through 1966 film Senasuma Kothanada directed by K.A.W. Perera with a dance in song Sulan Kurullo.

On 14 March 2015, she celebrated 50 years of artistic career by releasing CD with instrumental music titled Veena. The ceremony was held at Mahaweli Centre, Colombo. Sugathapala wrote a book Sugatha Chintha. In 2019, she returns to cinema after a break of a decade with the film Iskoleta Man Awa.

She also acted in few television serials such as Sakura Mal, Makara Vijithaya, Rankira Soya and Kindurangana.

== Filmography ==
Year	Film	Role	Ref.
1966	Senasuma Kothanada		
1969	Senehasa		
1969	Surayangeth Suraya		
1972	Miringuwa		
1972	Edath Suraya Adath Suraya		
1972	Veeduru Gewal		
1982	Newatha Hamu Wemu	Art show announcer	
1984	Hitha Honda Kollek		
1985	Rosy		
1985	Obata Divura Kiyannam	1st Doctor	
1988	Gedara Budun Amma		
1997	Tharanaya		
2000	Undaya	Beatrice aunty	
2019	Iskoleta Man Awa	Principal's mother	
