= Let's Design =

- Created by: Cotton Council International
- Country of origin: India

Production
- Running time: 60 minutes

Original release
- Network: Zoom TV

Let's Design is an annual Indian reality television series on Zoom TV which focuses on fashion design. The contestants compete with each other in each episode to create the best clothes and are usually restricted in time, materials and theme. Their designs are judged, and one or more designers are eliminated each week. The show is sponsored by Cotton Council International and dedicated to the promotion of cotton.

The show took place in Delhi for season 1 (2009) and Mumbai for seasons 2 and 3.

The 2011 winner was Govind Kumar Singh, and Dhruv Singh won in 2012.

The fifth series is due to begin on 19 November 2012.
