= Madhubala – Ek Ishq Ek Junoon =

2012 Indian television series

- Genre: Drama; Dark Romance
- Written by: Saurabh Tewari; Abhishek Kumar; Nishikant Roy; Janaki V; Sharad Tripathi; Gautam Hegde
- Directed by: Ravindra Gautam; Amit D Malik
- Creative director: Yoma Shreshth
- Starring: See below
- Country of origin: India
- Original language: Hindi
- No. of seasons: 2
- No. of episodes: 648

Production
- Producers: Saurabh Tewari; Abhinav Shukla
- Cinematography: Ganesh Sankla
- Editor: Rochak Ahuja
- Production companies: Nautanki Films

Original release
- Network: Colors TV
- Release: 28 May 2012 – 9 August 2014

Madhubala – Ek Ishq Ek Junoon (transl. Madhubala — A Love, A Passion) is an Indian Hindi-language television series that aired on Colors TV from 28 May 2012 to 9 August 2014. Produced to celebrate 100 years of Indian cinema by Shaurabh Tewari and Abhinav Shukla under the banner Nautanki Films, it stars Vivian Dsena and Drashti Dhami in lead roles, with Dhami essaying the titular character. It is currently digitally available on JioHotstar.

== Plot ==
=== Season 1 ===
==== 1991 ====
In Motihari, Padmini Chaudhary endures an abusive marriage to the wealthy Balraj Chaudhary, a man with a deep-seated prejudice against daughters. When a fortune teller prophesies that his unborn child will cause his destruction, a heavily pregnant Padmini resolves to flee to Mumbai with her step-daughter, Trishna. They encounter Shamsher and Roma Malik, a stuntman and junior artist in the Mumbai film industry. With Balraj's men in hot pursuit, Padmini and Shamsher stage her death to secure her freedom. Padmini joins the film industry as a background artist and unexpectedly gives birth to her daughter, Madhubala on set. To avoid raising questions, Shamsher becomes the foster father of Madhubala and Trishna, and they form a makeshift family living together in a chawl.

==== 20 years later ====
Madhubala "Madhu" Shamsher Malik grows into a beautiful young woman with no particular ambition, working as a beautician in a parlour following her mother's retirement from the industry. Trishna, meanwhile, aspires to become a major actress and star opposite Rishabh "RK" Kundra, India's biggest superstar, with Roma's support.

Madhu's life takes a dramatic turn when she witnesses an accident involving her acquaintance Mukund Dixit and files a hit-and-run case against the perpetrator who, unbeknownst to her, is RK. Although initially reluctant to pursue legal action, Mukund falls for Madhu and decides to defy his family, who wish to settle the matter out of court by accepting ₹25 lakhs in compensation from RK. The case causes RK extreme public defamation and leads to his arrest; he spends four days and nights in jail, deeply bruising his ego. Notoriously arrogant, wicked, and narcissistic, RK feigns a change of heart and apologizes to Madhu, claiming that facing consequences of his actions has led him to reflect on his life. Under the guise of goodwill, he gives Trishna an important role in his film, prompting the Malik sisters to reconcile after their relationship fractured from Madhu's decision to prioritize Mukund's case over Trishna's career.

Madhu and Mukund get engaged, an event orchestrated, unbeknownst to them, by RK and Mukund's mother, Savita Dixit. RK attends the engagement and deliberately places himself and Madhu in compromising positions, spreading news of their alleged affair through manipulated images in the news. He publicly sullies Madhu's character, labelling her his "laila" in a derogatory fashion. The Malik family, believing RK to be innocently implicated, request that he publicly clarify the situation. Instead, RK uses a press conference to slander Madhu further, questioning the relationship between Padmini and Shamsher, who were never married. He alleges that they are in an illegitimate relationship, which explains why Madhu has been behaving illicitly with him despite her engagement and using him to advance her sister's career. The Malik and Dixit families are deeply traumatized as RK continues to circulate more compromised images of himself and Madhu via MMS texts. Mukund, conflicted and pressured by his mother, breaks up with Madhu.

Enraged by the humiliation of his daughter and Padmini, Shamsher confronts RK on set, where RK's bodyguards beat him to the verge of death. Upon seeing her foster father's condition and her traumatized mother, Madhu publicly slaps RK four times, further igniting his hatred and obsession for her.

Seeking revenge, RK offers to pay for Shamsher's exorbitant medical bills in exchange for Madhu's hand in marriage. Left with no choice, Madhu privately marries RK in a humiliating ceremony consisting of only four circumambulations and no vermillion, with the nuptial chain thrown at her. RK, his ego wounded, tries his utmost to break her spirit.

Eventually, RK's behavior pushes Madhu into leaving his house during a storm in a frenzy, leading his mother Radha to reprimand him on his vile behavior towards his wife. RK saves Madhu's life, and they are forced to spend a night on his film set, where he cares for her. In a vulnerable moment, RK opens up about his traumatizing childhood, his father's suicide at a young age and his mother's immediate remarriage to a toxic man, which sabotaged his life. Upon learning this, Madhu softens towards him and feels guilty for having once used his private family photographs in retaliation to his abuse; these were later published in the media by his stepbrother Sikandar Bhatia. Despite the humiliation, Madhu slowly begins to unravel him through her stubbornness, pride, and domesticity, even guiding him to reconnect with his faith and religion.

Meanwhile, Shamsher, harboring immense hatred against RK for keeping his daughter as a "slave wife", shoots RK to save her. But ironically, Madhu has fallen in love with RK and donates her blood to him, desperately praying to God for his life. RK miraculously survives the fatal shot and eventually discovers the true perpetrator, but chooses to forgive Shamsher out of admiration for the foster father-daughter relationship Shamsher shares with Madhu and as karma for his own past actions. But Madhu painfully cuts ties with her father.

No longer rude to Madhu, RK begins to love her as she tries to restore his relationship with his mother, while RK helps Padmini and Shamsher get officially married. Simultaneously, Balraj discovers the truth about Padmini and Madhu and attempts to murder them all, but is ultimately shot dead by Padmini in self-defence.

RK then decides he needs a break from films and wishes to remarry Madhu by elopement. Madly in love, Madhu agrees to leave everyone behind for RK. But at the altar, in a brutal twist, RK reveals that it was all a lie, an elaborate "prem-game" he had orchestrated from the outset by assuming the role of her lover, boasting it as his finest acting performance to date. His sole intent was to manipulate her into falling in love with him so deeply and profoundly that his betrayal would hollow her out and annihilate her spirit, condemning her to live out her entire life as a dead woman in retribution for the four slaps. In shock, Madhu is in complete denial as she begs him to reconsider. RK's cruelty does not waver, even as everyone around him admonishes him for his betrayal and curses him to an eternity of misery upon learning the truth.

Madhu becomes numb and hollow as she returns to her maternal family, feigning to move on in her devastation. To regain her independence, as advised by RK's mother, she takes a job as a hairstylist on RK's film, where he continues to harass her and is adamant about making her leave. In pride and pain, Madhu refuses and continues to work, eventually encountering the notorious gangster Sultan while protecting his son Aryan from goons. Aryan and Madhu become emotionally attached as Madhu feels motherly instincts for the child, whom Sultan, a single father, treats poorly.

RK is unable to reconcile himself to Madhu's indifference toward him and regards her with a sense of proprietorship, even misunderstanding Madhu and Sultan's proximity as an affair. Driven by obsession, he stalks her before kidnapping and handcuffing her, threatening suicide if she leaves. Emotionally drained from being forced to confess her love for him repeatedly, Madhu is unable to escape in fear of RK self-harming after he mutilates his hand in front of her.

Sultan tries to protect her after overhearing Padmini and Trishna's petrified conversation about the kidnapping; however, Madhu berates him for pointing a gun at RK and not minding his own business. Sultan realizes he has fallen in love with Madhu and tries to make her understand how abusive RK is.

Madhu, deeply hurt by RK's behavior and his lack of remorse for breaking her heart, turns vengeful and uses RK's manipulative tactics to make him trust her so she can break his heart in return. Surprising her, however, RK publicly proposes to her. Madhu, despite her broken trust and bitterness, genuinely falls deeper in love and gives their relationship another chance, unbeknownst to her family and Sultan, who still believe she is taking revenge. Afraid of her mother sabotaging her plan to reunite with RK, Madhu decides to marry him and inform her family afterward. But Padmini, terrified of what RK might do to Madhu if she broke his heart and humiliated him, sends Sultan to talk sense into Madhu on her wedding day. RK overhears the conversation and feels that Madhu betrayed him. Terrified of losing RK, Madhu tries to relentlessly explain that she had changed her mind, yelling at Sultan for his interreference in her personal life and ruining everything.

Ultimately, RK realizes the extent to which he had hurt Madhu, leading a righteous and soft-hearted person like her to become like him. He publicly apologizes for hurting her, and they both decide to let bygones be bygones and get married.

Sultan, heartbroken and feeling betrayed, discovers that he and RK share the same father, Mohan Kundra, and that his biological mother was pushed to insanity after Mohan abandoned her to marry Radha. Sultan demands that RK publicly acknowledge his mother as a Kundra, which RK refuses to do, and Sultan calls RK the bastard son. Unable to see RK, who is severely attached to his deceased father, hurt and angered by Sultan's audacity, Madhu confronts him and learns of his love for her. Madhu brutally rejects him, stating that she has always loved RK no matter what has happened. Unable to bear the constant rejection, Sultan turns vengeful and fakes his death, framing RK for his murder before blackmailing Madhu into giving RK a divorce. To save RK from prison, Madhu helplessly agrees. But RK refuses, harasses and admonishes Madhu before uncovering the truth and actually murdering Sultan for real this time, proving it as self-defence.

But in this tussle, RK neglects his career and becomes embroiled in a dispute with a producer who bans him from the industry. Seeing no way around it, RK chooses to produce his own film after Madhu convinces the veteran director Mehul Chopra to come on board. Mehul chooses Madhu as the heroine, which she initially refuses. Thinking his career is over after the alternative choice for heroine faces conspiracy, RK is about to commit suicide when his assistant, Bittu, informs him that Madhu has stepped in as his leading lady, taking her first step into Indian cinema as she was always destined to do so.

Excited and thankful, RK and Madhu work on their first film together. But midway through shooting, RK gets severely injured and suffers partial paralysis, rendering him immobile and unable to shoot. Madhu decides to complete the film and turn it into a heroine-centric project, which makes RK deeply temperamental, insecure and bitter, even as she becomes pregnant. RK pushes for an abortion, reasoning that a pregnant heroine would not appeal to the mass audience. Madhu, however, refuses and completes the film, and eventually RK is cured of his handicap well saving her in the climax.

The film Ishq Ek Junoon becomes a superhit, pulling RK out of his personal and financial troubles, and Madhu becomes an overnight sensation. But RK cannot stand Madhu's rising fame and being sidelined. Madhu, uncaring for her own fame, only wants to be a mother. RK, essentially projecting his own feelings, constantly blames her for being fame-hungry, causing her to miscarry their child under stress. Manipulated by his aunt Pabo and still insecure, RK accuses her of intentionally aborting the child so she can become an actress. Madhu is disgusted and leaves home, but quickly returns after RK comes to see her.

Still in self-destructive mode, RK befriends Riya, a stunt girl, in one of his new films and begins a "friendship" with her. Recognizing this for what it is, Madhu pushes for an end to the relationship. RK refuses, justifying them as just friends, and continues to see her, putting Riya above Madhu when Riya accuses Madhu of calling her RK's mistress and self-harms. Eventually, RK sees through Riya when she accuses him of sexual assault after he refuses to physically cheat on Madhu, prompting him to fully return to Madhu and put an end to his bitterness. To make up for his mistakes, RK pushes Madhu to take on films. But knowing that her career is what drove RK away, Madhu refuses to return to the industry and chooses instead to live simply as RK's wife.

Eventually, RK's look-alike, KRK is introduced by RK's step-father, Kulbhushan Bhatia, who wants to destroy RK and take his money. KRK begins living as RK with Madhu well the real RK is sent to jail as KRK. The truth is revealed when KRK feels guilty for deceiving Madhu, who genuinely loves RK. RK is freed from jail, gives KRK prize money for his honesty, and sends his step-father to jail.

As the season nears its final climax, Madhu, pregnant again, gives birth to a daughter, who RK names Madhubala. Harshvardhan Kapoor, a new producer, approaches RK to help launch his son, Abhay Kapoor into the film industry. RK refuses and in a rage, Harshvardhan threatens to "burn him alive" after severe losses and his son's ruined career. But Harshvardhan's family members actually carry out the threat, due to personal greed and kill the Kundra family, including RK and Madhu, in a bomb blast. Radha, along with little Madhubala, manage to escape, paving the way for a new story and a new Madhubala.

=== Season 2 ===
RK and Madhu's family's death is planned by Pammi Harshvardhan Kapoor and Nikhil Lamba to avenge their insult from Harshvardhan, and RK and also to trap and put Harshavardhan Kapoor in jail for killing RK and Madhu as well as for snatching Harshvardhan's property, RK's property and RK's Mansion. Radha escapes with Madhu II and raises her away from the film industry and Mumbai, but Madhu II is interested in films, dance, music and dramas just like her parents.

Madhu II is now all grown up and looks just like her mother, the late Madhu. She lives with Radha and falls in love, with Abhay Kapoor. In RK mansion now Abhay and Kapoor family are residing after the death of RK, Madhu, Kundra's and Bhatia's. They announce their marriage, but he gets her married to Raja, RK's mentally challenged second look alike, who is in fact KRK's son.

Abhay reveals that, he had wanted to avenge death of his father, Harsh Vardhan, who had committed suicide after being incriminated for killing RK and Madhu. Actually KRK's son, Raja finally becomes a normal person and also kills Abhay Kapoor for torturing Madhu and him. Due to his life of a gangster, Madhu II hates and insults him. Angry, Raja rapes her. She files a case and gets him jailed, but withdraws it later.

Baiji dies. Due to being jailed, Raja thinks Madhu II is the reason for it and begins hating and torturing her. Pregnant with his child, she later requests him to forgive her, which Raja does. They remarry. One night, a producer assumes Raja as RK and proposes to do a film with him that the producer had wanted to do with RK and Madhu.

Madhu II reads Madhu's diary, learning that her last wish was to make a film on her and RK's life. She convinces Raja to sign the film; they start their career and appear as Madhu and RK, giving the first shot of their film. Raja states it is not the end, but the beginning of a new life as they were always destined to live and be superstars together.

== Cast ==
=== Main ===
- Vivian Dsena as
  - Rishabh "RK" Kundra: Mohan and Radha's son; Sultan's half-brother; Sikandar's younger step-brother; Madhubala Kundra's husband; Madhubala Kushwaha's father (2012–2014)
  - Keval Ram "KRK" Kushwaha: RK's look alike; Jugnu's brother; Kulbhushan's accomplice; Raja's father (2013–2014)
  - Raja "Raju" Kushwaha: KRK's son; Jugnu's nephew; Madhubala Kushwaha's husband (2014)
- Drashti Dhami as
  - Madhubala "Madhu" Rishabh Kundra: Balraj and Padmini's daughter; Shamsher's adopted daughter; Trishna's half-sister; RK's wife; Madhubala Kushwaha's mother (2012–2014)
  - Madhubala "Madhu" Kundra Kushwaha: RK and Madhubala Kundra's daughter; Aryan's cousin; Raja's wife (2014)
    - Spandan Chaturvedi as Child Madhubala Kundra (2014)

=== Recurring ===
==== Maliks ====
- Pallavi Purohit as Padmini Malik: Balraj's ex-wife; Shamsher's wife; Madhubala Kundra's mother; Trishna's adoptive mother; Madhubala Kushwaha's grandmother (2012–2013)
- Bhupinder Singh as Shamsher Malik: Roma's brother; Padmini's second husband; Madhubala Kundra and Trishna's adoptive father; Madhubala Kushwaha's adoptive grandfather (2012–2013)
- Aarti Puri as Trishna Malik: Balraj's daughter; Padmini and Shamsher's adopted daughter; Madhubala Kundra's half-sister (2012–2013)
- Rakhee Tandon as Roma Malik: Former actress; Shamsher's sister (2012–2013)

==== Chaudharys ====
- Raj Zutshi as Balraj Choudhary: Shobha's son; Padmini's ex-husband; Trishna and Madhubala Kundra's father; Madhubala's Kushwaha's grandfather (2012–2013)
- Shagufta Ali as Shobha Choudhary: Balraj's mother; Trishna and Madhubala Kundra's grandmother; Madhubala Kushwaha's great-grandmother (2012)

==== Bhatias ====
- Shama Deshpande as Radha Bhatia: Mohan's widow; Kulbhushan's wife; RK's mother and Sikandar's step mother; Madhubala Kundra's grandmother (2012–2014)
- Raza Murad as Kulbhushan Bhatia: Radha's second husband; RK's step-father; Sikandar's father; Madhubala Kundra's step-grandfather (2012–2014)
- Sikandar Kharbanda as Sikandar Bhatia: Kulbhushan's son and Radha's step son; RK's elder step brother; Deepali's husband
- Seema Mishra as Deepali Bhatia: RK's ex girlfriend; Sikandar's wife

==== Kundras ====
- Zarina Wahab as Meera Kundra: Mohan's second wife; Sultan's mother; Aryan's grandmother
- Navneet Nishan/Seema Kapoor as Parmeet "Paabo" Kundra: Mohan's sister
- Avinesh Rekhi as Sultan Kundra: Mohan and Meera's son; RK's half-brother; Asmita's widower; Aryan's father (2012–2013)
- Rishi Sonecha as Aryan Kundra: Sultan and Asmita's son; Madhubala Kushwaha's cousin (2013)

==== Sharmas ====
- Indresh Malik as Barun "Bittu" Sharma: RK's ex-personal secretary, Raja's personal secretary; Madhubala Kushwaha's adopted uncle; Leela's husband; Sweety and Sunny's father (2012–2014)
- Swati Anand as Leelavati "Leela" Sharma: Bittu's wife; Sweety and Sunny's mother (2013–2014)
- Prashant Chawla as Sunil "Sunny" Sharma: Bittu and Leela's son; Sweety's brother; Madhubala Kushwaha's adopted brother and friend (2014)

==== Dixits ====
- Usha Nadkarni as Sonali Dixit: Mukund and Swati's mother (2012)
- Manish Naggdev as Mukund Dixit: Sonali's son; Swati's brother; Madhubala Kundra's ex-fiancé (2012)
- Ahsaas Channa as Swati Dixit: Sonali's daughter; Mukund's sister (2012)

==== Kapoors ====
- Neelu Kohli as Harjeet Kapoor: Harsh and Umesh's mother (2014)
- Arbaaz Ali Khan as Harsh Vardhan Kapoor: Film Director; Harjeet's son; Umesh's brother; Pammi's husband; Abhay and Ananya's father (2013–2014)
- Deepshikha Nagpal as Pammi "Pam" Kapoor: Harsh's second wife; Ananya's mother; Abhay's step-mother; RK and Madhubala Kundra's murderer (2014)
- Gunjan Utreja as Abhay Kapoor: Harsh's son; Pammi's step-son; Ananya's half-brother; Madhubala Kushwaha's ex-fiancé; Sweety's fake-husband (2014)
- Shweta Vyas/Tanvi Thakkar as Sweety Sharma Kapoor: Leela and Bittu's daughter; Sunny's sister; Abhay's fake-wife (2013)
- Rajesh Balwani as Umesh Kapoor: Harjeet's son; Harsh's brother; Dolly's husband; Aisha's father (2014)
- Utkarsha Naik as Daljeet "Dolly" Umesh Kapoor: Umesh's wife; Aisha's mother (2014)
- Fenil Umrigar as Ayesha Kapoor: Umesh and Dolly's daughter; Abhay and Ananya's cousin (2014)

==== Lambas ====
- Puneet Sachdev as Nikhil Lamba: Ananya's husband; RK and Madhubala Kundra's co-murderer (2014)
- Kishwer Merchant as Ananya Kapoor Lamba: Harsh and Pammi's daughter; Abhay's half-sister; Nikhil's wife (2014)

==== Kushwahas ====
- Ravi Khanvilkar as Jignesh "Jugnu" Kushwaha: KRK's brother; Baiji's husband; Agni's father (2014)
- Shraddha Jaiswal as Agni Kushwaha: Jugnu and Baiji's daughter; Raja's cousin (2014)
- Shalini Arora/Jaya Bhattacharya as Namita "Baiji" Kushwaha: Jugnu's wife; Agni's mother (2014)

=== Others ===
- Kannan Arunachalam as Rashid Baig: Mohan's driver
- Lalit Parimoo as Hansmukh Ram Naigatre (Guruji) (2012)
- Sushmita Mukherjee as Dai Maa (2012)
- Vaishnavi Dhanraj as Riya Mehrotra
- Manini Mishra as Journalist Ilana "Ila" Ramani
- Anita Hassanandani as Sanya Nair
- Vinay Apte as Shivdutt Marathe
- Sheetal Thakkar as Tara
- Jaswant Menaria as Bhanu Pratap Singh
- Pooja Sahu as Faguni Kushwaha
- Shivam Sain
- Sameer Rajda as Rishi Uncle
- Jitendra Pathak as Doctor
- Manisha Kumari
- Neha Pendse as Ria
- Rajshri Rani as Deepika
- Kabbir as Rohan
- Garima Jain as Garima
- Amar Maurya as Manager

== Guest ==
- Sara Khan
- Shahrukh Khan as Rahul from Chennai Express
- Deepika Padukone as Meenamma "Meena" from Chennai Express
- Kunal Karan Kapoor as Mohan from Na Bole Tum Na Maine Kuch Kaha
- Aakanksha Singh as Megha from Na Bole Tum Na Maine Kuch Kaha
- Tejasswi Prakash as Dhara from Sanskaar – Dharohar Apnon Ki
- Toral Rasputra as Anandi from Balika Vadhu
- Sanaya Irani as Parvati "Paro" from Rang Rasiya
- Ashish Sharma as Rudra from Rang Rasiya
- Dipika Kakkar as Simar from Sasural Simar Ka
- Dheeraj Dhoopar as Prem from Sasural Simar Ka
- Avika Gor as Roli from Sasural Simar Ka
- Manish Raisinghan as Siddhant from Sasural Simar Ka
- Shakti Arora as Ranveer from Meri Aashiqui Tum Se Hi
- Radhika Madan as Ishani from Meri Aashiqui Tum Se Hi
- Raqesh Bapat as Asad from Qubool Hai
- Surbhi Jyoti as Zoya from Qubool Hai
- Shabir Ahluwalia as Abhi from Kumkum Bhagya
- Sriti Jha as Pragya from Kumkum Bhagya
- Karan Veer Mehra as Naren from Pavitra Rishta
- Ankita Lokhande as Ankita from Pavitra Rishta
- Karanvir Bohra as Aahil from Qubool Hai
- Surbhi Jyoti as Sanam from Qubool Hai
- Piyush Sahdev as Kabir "KT" from Sapne Suhane Ladakpan Ke
- Mahima Makwana as Rachna from Sapne Suhane Ladakpan Ke
- Ankit Gera as Mayank from Sapne Suhane Ladakpan Ke
- Roopal Tyagi as Gunjan from Sapne Suhane Ladakpan Ke
- Karan Patel as Raman from Yeh Hai Mohabbatein
- Divyanka Tripathi as Ishita from Yeh Hai Mohabbatein
- Avinash Sachdev as Shlok from Iss Pyaar Ko Kya Naam Doon? Ek Baar Phir
- Shrenu Parikh as Astha from Iss Pyaar Ko Kya Naam Doon? Ek Baar Phir
- Rithvik Dhanjani as Arjun from Pavitra Rishta
- Asha Negi as Purvi from Pavitra Rishta
- Karan Singh Grover as Asad from Qubool Hai
- Surbhi Jyoti as Zoya from Qubool Hai
- Gurmeet Choudhary as Yash from Punar Vivaah – Zindagi Milegi Dobara
- Kratika Sengar as Aarti from Punar Vivaah – Zindagi Milegi Dobara
- Harshad Arora as Zain from Beintehaa
- Preetika Rao as Aaliya from Beintehaa
- Mrunal Jain as Akash from Uttaran
- Tina Datta as Meethi from Uttaran
- Sidharth Shukla as Shiv from Balika Vadhu

== Awards and nominations ==
Year	Award	Category	Recipient	Result
2012	People's Choice Awards India	Favourite New TV Drama	Madhubala – Ek Ishq Ek Junoon	Won
2012	Indian Television Academy Awards	Gr8 Performer of the Year	Vivian Dsena	Won
2013
2013	Indian Telly Awards	Actress in a Lead Role	Drashti Dhami	Nominated
2013	Indian Telly Awards	Actor in a Lead Role	Vivian Dsena	Nominated
2013	Indian Telly Awards	Actor in a Negative Role	Raj Zutshi	Nominated
2013	Indian Telly Awards	Actress in a Negative Role	Seema Mishra	Nominated
2013	Indian Telly Awards	Daily Serial	Madhubala – Ek Ishq Ek Junoon	Nominated
2013	Indian Telly Awards	Drama Series	Madhubala – Ek Ishq Ek Junoon	Nominated
2013	Indian Telly Awards	Best Jodi	Vivian Dsena and Drashti Dhami	Won
2013	Indian Telly Awards	Actress in a Supporting Role	Pallavi Purohit	Won
2013	Indian Telly Awards	Show Packaging(Fiction)	Madhubala – Ek Ishq Ek Junoon	Won
2013	Zee Gold Awards	Best Actor(Jury)	Vivian Dsena	Won

== Adaptations ==
Madhubala – Ek Ishq Ek Junoon was syndicated extensively both within India and internationally, alongside producing local television adaptations. For domestic regional markets, the series was dubbed into Telugu as Madhubala – Oo Prema Oo Paga on Gemini TV, Malayalam as Madhubala – Oru Pranayam Oru Abhinivesham on Surya TV, and in Tamil as Madhubala – Konjam Ishtam Konjam Kashtam on Polimer TV. Beyond dubbing, the show was remade into other languages; a Kannada adaptation titled Ashwini Nakshatra premiered on Colors Kannada on 6 October 2013, followed by an official Marathi remake titled Mohini - Premachi Filmy Kahaani, which began airing on Colors Marathi on 22 March 2026.

Internationally, the series achieved widespread global distribution, airing across more than 20 countries and being translated or dubbed into numerous languages, including English, Spanish, Arabic, Persian, Turkish, and Indonesian (Bahasa Indonesia). In Iraq and Kurdistan, the series was broadcast in Kurdish on Kurdmax TV, while in the Balkan region, a Serbian-dubbed version aired on Pink 2. The series found notable success in Turkey under the title Yalancı Bahar on Kanal 7, where it gained a significant following, mirroring a broader trend of Indian television dramas capturing substantial viewing shares in Central Asia, North Africa, and Eastern Europe.
