= Kasamh Se =

Hindi-language Indian television series

- Genre: Soap opera
- Created by: Ekta Kapoor
- Developed by: Ekta Kapoor
- Written by: Mahesh Pandey
- Directed by: Anil V. Kumar
- Creative directors: Nivedita Basu; Sandiip Sikcand; Vikas Gupta; Suraj Rao; Mitu Saxena; Sukriti Saxena
- Starring: Prachi Desai; Roshni Chopra; Arunima Sharma; Ram Kapoor; Sudha Shivpuri; Jaya Bhattacharya; Gurdeep Kohli; Manasi Varma; Pallavi Purohit; Ashwini Kalsekar; Vivian Dsena
- Opening theme: "Kasamh Se" by Nihira Joshi
- Country of origin: India
- Original language: Hindi
- No. of seasons: 4
- No. of episodes: 742

Production
- Producers: Ekta Kapoor; Shobha Kapoor
- Editor: Vikas Sharma
- Running time: 24 minutes
- Production company: Balaji Telefilms

Original release
- Network: Zee TV
- Release: 16 January 2006 – 12 March 2009

Related
- Kindurangana

Kasamh Se (English title: The Promise) is an Indian soap opera produced by Ekta Kapoor for Balaji Telefilms. The show aired on Zee TV from 16 January 2006 to 12 March 2009, when the series ended due to cost issues. The story is about three sisters: Bani, Piya and Rano.

== Plot ==
Three Dixit sisters; Bani, Pia, and Rano are different but are close to each other. They live in Mount Abu. After their father's death, the three sisters go to Mumbai to live with Jai Udai Walia, a ruthless business tycoon who knew their parents. Jai falls for Pia, but she loves Jai's employee Pushkar Shukla and is more interested in Jai's wealth. Their marriage is arranged but on the wedding day, Pia elopes with Pushkar. To save the Dixit family's honor and mostly persuaded by Jai's cunning sister Jigyasa, Bani takes Pia's place at the altar and marries Jai. Jai is initially furious, but falls for Bani as time passes. They kiss after a family function arranged by Jai's friend Roshni. Meanwhile, Jai's nephew (Jigyasa's younger son) Sahil falls for Rano and they get married.

Though Pia is married to Pushkar, after an argument with Pushkar she becomes interested in Jai's wealth and tries to steal him from Bani. Once Jai goes on a business trip, Pia follows him, spikes his drink, and sexually assaults him. This leaves Jai shaken.

On Bani and Jai's one-year anniversary, it is revealed that Pia is pregnant with Jai's child. Bani goes into trauma but later forgives them. Pia gives birth to a son, Veer, while Rano gives birth a son, Varun. Sahil is killed and Pia frames Bani for his death and blackmails Jai: he can either let Bani spend life in jail or testify that she is mentally ill and she can spend only five years in a mental hospital. Jai, who is left with no option, rules that Bani is mentally ill and she is sent to a mental hospital.

At the hospital, Bani gives birth to twins Krishna and Atharva but they are taken away by Jai. Bani escapes from the hospital and is rescued by a man named Aparajit Deb, who takes her under his wing. He takes an interest in Bani and offers her to come with him abroad so she can get away from her past. Bani agrees but promises that she will return for her children.

=== 5 years later ===
Krishna and Atharva are now five years old. Pia does not take care of them or Veer. Bani, who has adopted the name Durga Dasgupta, returns to take her children, expose Pia for what she has done, and take revenge against Jai. Later, she learns that Jai had done nothing and he testified against her only to save her. Pia is thrown out of the house and tries to get Veer back. Pia meets with an accident and is left in a wheelchair. Bani and Rano forgive and help her.

It is revealed that Bani had a twin sister, Anamika, who was given away as a newborn and is dead. Her husband, Daksh Randheria, became mentally unstable after that. He only acts normal when he is with Bani. Krishna and Atharva are kidnapped and murdered in front of Bani and Jai. Struck by the loss of his children and instigation by Jigyasa, Jai kicks Bani out of the house. Jai's aunt supports Bani and leaves the house with her. Bani, feeling like she has nothing left, tries to kill herself but is saved. She is revealed to be pregnant and finds hope in her life again. Daksh is cured.

=== 5 years later ===
Bani lives by the name of Maithili with Jai's aunt and her 5-year-old daughter Ganga in Meerut. Daksh is helping Bani. Jai has moved on and made his business flourish. He has remarried, this time to a new character, Meera Khandelwal. Jai meets Ganga and has a good connection with her, not knowing that she is his daughter. Later, he learns that Ganga is his daughter. Ganga is revealed to have blood cancer and the only way she can survive is by attempting a bone marrow transplant that can only be donated by family. This makes Jai and Bani come together to save Ganga. Jai learns the truth that Bani was never having an affair with Daksh and apologizes to her. Jigyasa is revealed to have gotten the Walia twins kidnapped. Jai sends Jigyasa to jail but Bani does not believe that she killed them. Jigyasa is taking the blame for the murder because the actual killer has blackmailed her that they would kill Jigyasa's elder son Ranbir if she didn't.

Bani gives birth to another set of twins, who are named after Krishna and Atharva. Ganga undergoes surgery and is cured. Daksh finds out who killed the twins but before he can reveal it, he is murdered. The family takes a trip to Bani's maternal home in Mount Abu. Pia is revealed to have been pretending to be handicapped to save Bani because the real killer is one of their family members. Pushkar takes Pia and Veer with him to London. It is revealed that Krishna and Atharva's killer is Meera. Meera confesses her crimes to Bani, beats her, and sets her on fire. Bani falls off a cliff, burning, into the lake. She is declared dead, which leaves Jai and the family devastated.

Bani is revealed to be alive. She is saved by a man named Partho Mitra. She loses her memory and her face is severely damaged. She gets a new face with plastic surgery. Partho adopts her and moves to Kolkata with her.

=== 16 years later ===
Bani and Jai's children, Krishna and Ganga are grown up. Bani lives as Pronita Mitra and has hazy nightmares of the night Meera tried to kill her. Soon, she meets Jai in Mount Abu, but Jai does not recognize her because of her new face. She also completes Ganga's painting in a painting exhibition. Bani is invited to a party at the Walia mansion, where she sees Meera and regains her memory. She vows to take down Meera and seek revenge for the years she has lost without her family. She learns that Meera has spoilt Bani's children and her and Jai's own son, Vicky. She exposes Meera in front of Jai. Meera accepts all the allegations and tells Jai the truth that she spoilt his children because Ganga and Krishna are Bani's daughters and if he divorced her, she could claim her share in the property. Jai and Bani decide to teach her a lesson. Jai pretends to apologize to Meera and asks for their second marriage. Jai and Bani trick Meera into signing divorce papers and Bani sits in the mandap and they marry. They also teach their children a lesson. Vicky also learns about Meera's truth and disowns her. It is revealed that Partho had been working with Jigyasa and Jigyasa was the one who saved Bani when Meera tried to kill her 16 years ago.

Meera tries to ruin Ganga's life by having her marry Pratyush Mittal. Mittals are bankrupt and Pratyush is only pretending to be in love with Ganga. Bani learns about it and with the help of Ganga's friend, Rishi Tyagi, and her hired actress, Sonali, expose Pratyush and Mittal family on the day of marriage. The Mittal family is arrested and Rishi, who had fallen in love with Ganga, makes a proposal in front of Walia family of marrying her. Ganga initially refuses but later agrees. They then marry. Bani tries to scare Meera pretending to be Bani's ghost/spirit/soul. Meera learns that Pronita is Bani and she is still alive and tries to kill her. Bani is saved by Jigyasa. Jai stops Meera from attacking Jigyasa. He is so furious that he tries to kill Meera but he is stopped by the Walia family. Meera is arrested and sent to jail. Jigyasa reunites with her family.

Jigyasa lies to Walia family that she had hired Pronita to expose Meera as she still wants Bani out of Jai's life and only used her to remove Meera. However, Rano and Pia come to know that Pronita is actually Bani and with help of Pushkar, prove her identity. Ganga falls in love with Rishi and they start to live happily. Jai and Pia's son Veer comes back to Mumbai. He is unaware of Jai, Bani, Pia's past because he was raised by Pia and Pushkar in London. He thinks Pushkar is his father. When he learns about Jai, Bani, and Pia's past, he, at Jigyasa's instigation, starts planning and plotting against Bani. Veer kills Pushkar and Pia blames Bani for Pushkar's death. She later forgives her. Jigyasa then creates a rift between Vicky and Ganga, and due to this stress, Jai has a heart attack and is paralyzed. The Walia family then make peace and Jigyasa reforms and apologizes to Bani for everything.

=== 1 year later ===
The family has relocated to Mount Abu. Bani and Jai come to their family during the festival of Holi and they celebrate with the whole family. Jai is completely recovered. The three sisters talk about how they started their journey here in Mount Abu. They are happy together with their family and all ends well.

== Cast ==
=== Main ===
- Prachi Desai as
  - Bani Dixit Walia (before plastic surgery) – Nishikant and Kiran's eldest daughter; Anamika, Piya and Rano's sister; Jai's wife; Krishna, Atharva, Ganga, Jr. Krishna and Jr. Atharva's mother (2006–2008)
    - Gurdeep Kohli as Bani Walia (after plastic surgery) (2008–2009)
  - Anamika Dixit Randheria – Nishikant and Kiran's second daughter; Bani, Piya and Rano's sister; Daksh's wife (2007) (Dead)
- Ram Kapoor as
  - Walia - Udai's father and Jai, Jigyasa and Nachiket's grand father (Photo) (2006)
  - Udai Walia - Walia's son and Jai, Jigyasa and Nachiket's father (Cameo) (2006)
  - Jai Walia – Udai's son; Walia's grandson; Jigyasa's brother; Nachiket's half-brother; Bani's husband; Meera's ex-husband; Veer, Krishna, Atharva, Ganga, Jr. Krishna, Jr. Atharva and Vicky's father (2006–2009)
- Roshni Chopra / Manasi Varma as Piya Dixit Shukla – Nishikant and Kiran's third daughter; Bani, Anamika and Rano's sister; Pushkar's widow; Veer's mother (2006–2008) / (2008–2009)
- Arunima Sharma / Pallavi Purohit as Rano Dixit Bali – Nishikant and Kiran's youngest daughter; Bani, Anamika and Piya's sister; Sahil's widow; Varun's mother (2006–2008) / (2008–2009)
- Ashwini Kalsekar / Jaya Bhattacharya as Jigyasa Walia Bali – Udai's daughter; Walia's grand daughter; Jai's sister; Nachiket's half-sister; Aditya's wife; Ranveer, Sahil and Anu's mother; Varun, Vidya and Nihita's grandmother (2006; 2007–2009) / (2006–2007)
- Ronit Roy as Aparajit Deb – A vengeful business tycoon; Bani's helper (2006–2008)

=== Recurring ===
- Siddharth Vasudev as Ranveer Bali – Jigyasa and Aditya's elder son; Sahil and Anu's brother; Rashi's husband; Vidya's father (2006–2008)
- Prashant Ranyal as Sahil Bali – Jigyasa and Aditya's younger son; Ranbir and Anu's brother; Rano's husband; Varun's father (2006–2007)
- Naman Shaw as Pushkar Shukla – Jai's employee; Mahesh's brother; Piya's husband; Veer's adoptive father (2006–2008) (Dead)
- Swati Anand as Rashi Chopra Bali – Ranvijay's daughter; Rohit's sister; Ranveer's wife; Vidya's mother (2006–2009)
- Manoj Joshi as Nishikant Dixit – Kiran's widower; Bani, Anamika, Piya and Rano's father; Veer, Krishna, Atharva, Varun, Ganga, Jr. Krishna and Jr. Atharva's grandfather (2006)
- Anuradha Rajyadhyaksha as Kiran Dixit – Nishikant's wife; Bani, Anamika, Piya and Rano's mother; Veer, Krishna, Atharva, Varun, Ganga, Jr. Krishna and Jr. Atharva's grandmother (2006)
- Nigaar Khan as Barnali Walia – Udai's second wife; Nachiket's mother; Jai and Jigyasa's step-mother (2006)
- Mayank Gandhi as Veer Pushkar Shukla – Piya's son and Pushkar's adoptive son (2008-2009)
- Mayank Sharma as Nachiket "Natwar" Walia – Walia's grand son; Udai and Barnali's son; Jai and Jigyasa's half-brother (2006–2008)
- Pawan Shankar as Tarun Sablok – Jai's friend; Bani's lawyer (2006-2007)
- Jatin Sial / Bakul Thakkar as Aditya Bali – Jai's best friend; Jigyasa's husband; Ranbir, Sahil and Anu's father; Varun, Vidya and Nihita's grandfather (2006–2007) / (2007–2009)
- Dilkhush Reporter as Anu Bali Chopra – Jigyasa and Aditya's daughter; Ranbir and Sahil's sister; Rohit's wife; Nihita's mother (2006–2008)
- Karan Patel / Saurabh Raj Jain as Rohit Chopra – Ranvijay's son; Rashi's brother; Anu's husband; Nihita's father (2006) / (2007–2008)
- Sudha Shivpuri as Mrs. Bali – Aditya's mother; Ranveer, Sahil and Anu's grandmother; Varun, Vidya and Nihita's great-grandmother (2006–2009)
- Pallavi Subhash as Meera Khandelwal Walia – Mohan's sister; Jai's ex-wife; Vicky's mother; Krishna and Atharva's murderer (2007–2008)
- Kamal Sadanah as Mohan Khandelwal – A Businessman; Jai's friend; Meera's brother (2006)
- Seema Bhargav as Billo – Karuna's mother; Jai and Jigyasa's aunt; Laxmi's grandmother (2006–2009)
- Rakshanda Khan as Roshni Chopra – Jai's ex-girlfriend; Ranvijay's sister; Rohit and Rashi's aunt (2006)
- Shabbir Ahluwalia as Sandeep Sikand aka Rock Star Sandy (2006)
- Kushal Punjabi as Lawyer
- Eijaz Khan as Anupam Kapadia
- Suvarna Jha / Priya Arya as Karuna Makhija – Billo's daughter; Laxmi's mother (2007–2008)
- Preeti Amin as Laxmi Makhija – Karuna's daughter (2008)
- Sumona Chakravarti as Nivedita Deb – Aparajit's sister (2007)
- Sumeet Vyas / Karan Hukku as Daksh Randheria – Anamika's widower (2007) / (2007–2008) (Dead)
- Atharva Dhanorkar as Atharva Walia – Bani and Jai's elder son; Krishna, Ganga, Jr. Krishna and Jr. Atharva's brother; Veer and Vicky's half-brother (2007)
- Diya Sonecha as Krishna Walia – Bani and Jai's eldest daughter; Atharva, Ganga, Jr. Krishna and Jr. Atharva's sister; Veer and Vicky's half-sister (2007)
- Priya Bathija as Ganga Walia Tyagi – Bani and Jai's second daughter; Krishna, Atharva, Jr. Krishna and Jr. Atharva's sister; Veer and Vicky's half-sister; Rishi's wife (2008–2009)
  - Ahsaas Channa as Child Ganga Walia (2007–2008)
- Vishal Singh as Rishi Tyagi – Ganga's husband (2008-2009)
- Akshita Kapoor as Jr. Krishna Walia – Bani and Jai's youngest daughter; Krishna, Atharva, Ganga and Jr. Atharva's sister; Veer and Vicky's half-sister (2008–2009)
- Unknown as Jr. Atharva Walia – Bani and Jai's younger son; Krishna, Atharva, Ganga and Jr. Krishna's brother; Veer and Vicky's half-brother (2008) (missing)
- Priya Marathe as Vidya Bali – Ranbir and Rashi's daughter (2008–2009)
  - Navika Kotia as Child Vidya Bali (2007–2008)
- Gautam Gulati as Varun Bali – Rano and Sahil's son (2008–2009)
- Vivian Dsena as Vicky Walia – Jai and Meera's son; Veer, Krishna, Atharva, Ganga, Jr. Krishna and Jr. Atharva's half-brother (2008–2009)
- Himanshu Tiwari as Veer Walia – Piya and Jai's son; Pushkar's adoptive son; Krishna, Atharva, Ganga, Jr. Krishna, Jr. Atharva and Vicky's half-brother (2007)
- Shailendra Singh as Partho Mitra – Jigyasa's partner; Pronita's father; Bani's father-figure (2008–2009)
- Utkarsha Naik as Sarla Shukla
- Kishwer Merchant as Seema Shukla – Mahesh's wife (2006)
- Amita Chandekar as Sonali – Jai's ex-girlfriend (2006)
- Anita Hassanandani as Mrs. Anupam Kapadia
- Neha Bam as Mrs. Mittal – Pratyush's mother (2008)
- Ajay Trehan as Mr. Mittal – Pratyush's father (2008)
- Lily Patel as Dadi's friend
- Ranvijay Razdan as Ranvijay Chopra: Roshni's brother; Rohit and Rashi's father (2006)
- Anjali Mukhi as Mrs. Chopra – Ranvijay's wife; Rohit and Rashi's mother (2006)
- Roopal Tyagi as Rhea
- Sanaya Irani as Geet
- Karan Wahi as Pradeep

=== Special appearances ===
- Rajshree Thakur as Saloni Nahar Singh – Invited to Rano's and Sahil's wedding
- Sharad Malhotra as Sagar Pratap Singh (Integration episode with Banoo Main Teri Dulhann)
- Divyanka Tripathi as Vidya Sagar Singh (Integration episode with Banoo Main Teri Dulhann)
- Hiten Tejwani as Anupam Kapadia
- Gauri Pradhan Tejwani as Mrs. Anupam Kapadia
- Sanjay Dutt as ACP Shamsher S. Khan: To promote his film Shootout at Lokhandwala
- Suniel Shetty as Inspector Kavi Raj Patil:To promote his film Shootout at Lokhandwala

== PewDiePie's parody and criticism (2018) ==
In May 2018, Swedish YouTuber PewDiePie (Felix Kjellberg) attracted attention after mocking Kasamh Se on social media. On 9 May, he shared a screenshot from the show's title sequence on Twitter, sarcastically captioning it "good quality" in reference to its visibly poor video resolution. He subsequently uploaded a parody video featuring scenes from the serial, poking fun at its dramatic camera zooms, exaggerated character reactions, editing and sound effects.

The incident gained attention among Indian social media users, particularly after the show's producer, Ekta Kapoor, responded to his tweet on 11 May. Kapoor questioned his identity and compared him to a foreign junior artist hired for her television productions. She later shared another response after PewDiePie uploaded a video addressing her reaction. The exchange received coverage from several Indian news publications and brought international online attention to the show's production style.

== Awards ==
| Year | Award | Category | Recipient | Role |
|---|---|---|---|---|
| 2006 | Kalakar Awards | Best Actress (Television) | Prachi Desai | Bani Jai Walia |
| 2006 | Kalakar Awards | Best Serial | Ekta Kapoor | Producer |
| 2006 | 6th Indian Telly Awards | Best Daily Serial | Ekta Kapoor | Producer |
| 2006 | 6th Indian Telly Awards | Best Actress in Negative Role | Ashwini Kalsekar | Jigyasa Bali |
| 2006 | 6th Indian Telly Awards | Best Fresh New Face (Female) | Prachi Desai | Bani Jai Walia |
| 2006 | 6th Indian Telly Awards | Best Onscreen Couple | Ram Kapoor and Prachi Desai | Jai Udai Walia and Bani Jai Walia |
| 2006 | 6th Indian Telly Awards | Best Actor (Popular) | Ram Kapoor | Jai Udai Walia |
| 2006 | 6th Indian Television Academy Awards | Best Actor (Jury) | Ram Kapoor | Jai Udai Walia |
| 2006 | 6th Indian Television Academy Awards | Best Serial (Jury) | Ekta Kapoor | Producer |
| 2007 | 7th Indian Telly Awards | Best Actor in Negative Role | Ronit Roy | Aparijit Deb |
| 2007 | 7th Indian Telly Awards | Best Actress (Popular) | Prachi Desai | Bani Jai Walia |
| 2007 | 7th Indian Telly Awards | Best Actor (Popular) | Ram Kapoor | Jai Udai Walia |
| 2007 | 7th Indian Television Academy Awards | Best Actress in Negative Role | Ashwini Kalsekar | Jigyasa Bali |
| 2008 | 8th Indian Telly Awards | Best Continuing TV Programme | Ekta Kapoor | Producer |
| 2008 | 8th Indian Telly Awards | Special Recommendation | Prachi Desai | Bani Jai Walia |

== Adaption ==
It was remade in Sinhala as Kindurangana in Sri Lanka.
