= List of programs broadcast by DD National =

This is a list of original television programming currently and formerly broadcast by DD National.

== Current broadcasts ==
=== Original series ===
Premiere date	Show	Ref.
1 July 2024	Hum To Middle Class Hai Ji	
4 August 2024	Cyber Crime Ki Duniya, Bach Ke Rehna	
1 September 2024	Suron Ka Eklavya Season 2	
18 November 2024	Fauji 2	
18 November 2024	Kakbhushundi Ramayan	
4 August 2025	Himachal se Olympic Tak Ka Safar	
21 September 2026	Suraag 2.0	

=== Reruns ===
- Anudamini
- Chitrahaar
- Galli Galli Sim Sim
- Rangoli Vividh Bharti Ke Sath
- Sanskar

=== Acquired series ===
- Baal Krishna
- Porus
- Shree Ganesh

=== Animated Series ===
- Krishna Balaram
- Super Bheem
- Mighty Raju
- Chorr Police

== Former broadcasts ==
=== Animated series ===
- Bongo
- Chhota Bheem
- Ghayab Aya
- Vartmaan
- Little Singham
- Kisna
- Sheikh Chilli and Friendz

=== Hindi dubbed shows ===
- 101 Dalmatians: The Series
- Aladdin
- Arabian Nights: Sinbad's Adventures
- Alice In Wonderland
- Chamatkari Telephone
- Codename: Kids Next Door
- Denver, the Last Dinosaur (Danu Danasur)
- DuckTales
- The Flintstones
- Guchche (Stories from My Childhood)
- The Jungle Book
- The Legend of Tarzan
- Lok Gatha
- Meena
- Mickey Mouse and Friends
- Nandu Apna (Kattile Kannan)
- Spider-Man
- TaleSpin
- Timon & Pumbaa
- Tom and Jerry

=== Children's/teen series ===
- Chutti chutti
- Hari Bhari phulwari
- khoj khajana khoj
- Babu
- The great experiments
- Natkhat Rani
- CIET TARANG
- Taram Too
- Baingan Raja
- Aadha Full
- Aryamaan – Brahmaand Ka Yodha
- Brahmand
- Chaat Pani
- Chand Sitare
- Chandamama
- Ek Do Teen Char
- Faster Fene
- Haddi Raja
- Galli Galli Sim Sim
- Junior G
- DD National Kidz Island
- M.A.D.
- Neev
- Potli Baba Ki
- Shaka Laka Boom Boom
- Shaktimaan
- School Days
- The Stone Boy
- Tarang
- Yahan Ke Hum Sikandar

==== Hindi dubbed shows ====
- Bananas in Pyjamas
- Giggle and Hoot

=== Comedy series ===
- Aashiq Biwi Ka
- Aisa Bhi Hota Hai
- Appu Aur Pappu
- Bajega Band Baaja
- Bunty Bubbly Ki Mummy
- Colgate Top 10
- Daane Anaar Ke
- Daftarnama
- Dekh Bhai Dekh
- Flop Show
- Full Tension
- Hari Mirchi Lal Mirchi
- Hum Hain Naa
- Idhar Udhar
- Kabhi Saas Kabhi Bahu
- Kana Phoosi
- Phatichar
- Mr. Funtoosh
- Mr Ya Mrs
- Oh Darling Yeh Hai India
- Phir Bhi Dil Hai Hindustani
- Padosan
- Shrimaan Shrimati
- Sohni Mahiwal
- Truck Dhina Dhin
- Tu Tota Main Maina
- Ulta Pulta
- Wagle Ki Duniya
- Yeh Jo Hai Zindagi
- Zabaan Sambhalke

==== Hindi dubbed shows ====
- Didi's Comedy Show
- Diff'rent Strokes
- Here's Lucy
- Yes Minister

=== Drama series ===
- 1857 Kranti
- Aa Bael Mujhe Maar
- Aahuti
- Aaina
- Aakhri Daao
- Aankhen
- Aap Beeti
- Aarohan
- Abhimaan
- Ados Pados
- Agneepath - Hai Yehi Zindagi
- Air Hostess
- Akbar The Great
- Akhand Saubhagyawati Bhava
- Albeli Kahaani Pyaar Ki
- Alif Laila
- Amrapali
- Amravati Ki Kathayein
- Amir Khusro
- Anudamini
- Anveshan
- Aparajita
- Apradhi Kaun
- Apne Aap
- Ardhangini
- Aur Bhi Gham Hain Zamane Mein
- Aurat, starring Mandira Bedi; the series, that aired in the late 1990s, focuses on challenges faced by women in society
- Bahadur Shah Zafar
- Bano Begum
- Barrister Roy
- Bas Thode Se Anjane
- Bharat Ek Khoj
- Betaal Pachisi
- Bharatiya Natya Sastra
- Bhootnath
- Bible Ki Kahaniya
- Buddha
- Buniyaad
- Bul Bul Bagh
- Byomkesh Bakshi
- Captain Vyom
- Chanakya
- Chandrakanta
- Chandramukhi
- Chapte Chapte
- Charitraheen
- Chekhov Ki Duniya
- Chhatrapati Shivaji
- Chhoti Badi Baatein
- Chhote Babu
- Chunauti
- Chunni
- Chupaun Kaise Laga Chunri Mein Daag
- Circus
- Corporate Sarpanch – Beti Desh Ki
- Dada Dadi Ki Kahaniyan
- Darpan
- Dastaan-e-Hatimtai
- Dastoor
- Dayasagar
- Deewar
- Dil Dariya
- Dil Apna Preet Parayee
- Dard Ka Rishta
- Dishayen
- Doosra Keval
- Ehsaas
- Ek Din Achanak
- Ek Kahaani
- Ek Kahani Aur Mili
- Ek Prem Katha
- Ek Se Badkar Ek
- Ek Tha Rusty
- Farmaan
- Fauji
- Faujji...The Iron Man
- Ganadevta
- Gayatri Mantra
- Geetanjali
- Geeta Rahasya
- Ghutan
- The Great Experiment
- The Great Maratha
- Grihdaah
- Gora
- Guldasta
- Gul Gulshan Gulfaam
- Gul Sanobar
- Habba Khatoon
- Hamare Gaurav
- Hello Bombay
- Hello Inspector
- Humsafar:The Train
- Hello Zindagi
- Himalaya Darshan
- Honee Anhonee
- Hum Hindustani
- Hum Log
- Hum Honge Kamyab
- Humrahi
- Idiot
- Imtihaan
- Indradhanush
- Intezaar
- Intezaar Aur Sahi
- IPS Diaries
- Isi Bahane
- Itihaas
- Jaan-e-Alam
- Jap Tap Vrat
- Jai Hanuman
- Jai Mata Ki
- Jai Ganga Maiya
- Jai Mahalaxmi
- Jannat
- Jantar Mantar
- Janki Jasoos
- Jasoos Vijay
- Jeevan Ek Rang Anek
- Jeevan ke Rang
- Jhansi Ki Rani
- Jo Kahunga Sach Kahunga
- Junoon
- Kaanch Ke Rishte
- Kab Tak Pukaru
- Kab Tak Pukaroon
- Kabeer
- Kabhi Door Kabhi Paas
- Kacchi Dhoop
- Kahan Gaye Woh Log
- Kahani Saat Pheron Ki
- Kahani Shahjahanabad Ki
- Kahkashan
- Kakaji Kahin
- Kal Hamara Hai
- Kalpana
- Kamrup Ki Kahani
- Kanoon
- Karamchand
- Karam Yudh
- Kasak
- Kashish
- Kashmakash Zindagi Ki
- Katha Sagar
- Katha Sarita
- Kati Patang Hai Life Yaaron
- Kayaamat
- Khandaan
- Khwabon Ke Darmiyan
- Khushiyan
- Kirdaar
- Kissa Kathmandu Ka
- Kisi Ki Nazarr Na Lage
- Koi To Ho Ardhnarishwar
- Kile Ka Rahasya
- Krantijyoti Savitribai Phule
- Kshitij Ye Nahi
- Kuch Reh Jeewiyal Pall
- Kuntee
- Lekin Wah Sach Tha
- Ladoo Singh Taxiwala
- Lady Inspector: Thrills and spills
- Lal Kothi Alvida
- Lifeline
- Lohit Kinare
- London Ki Ek Raat
- Luv Kush
- Maan
- Mahabharat
- Mahabharat Katha
- Maharaja Ranjit Singh
- Maharana Pratap
- Maharathi Karna
- Maila Aanchal
- Main Dilli Hoon
- Malgudi Days
- Mashaal
- Maulana Abul Kalam Azad
- Mirch Masala
- Meera
- Meher
- Milestone Stories
- Mirza Ghalib
- Miss India
- Mitti Ke Rang
- Munshi Premchand's Guldasta
- Munshi Premchand ki Kahani
- Miya Khoji Ke Karnamey
- A Mouthful of Sky
- Mr. Yogi
- Mrignayani
- Mrinal Sen's Stories
- Mrityunjay
- Morarji
- Mujrim Hazir
- Mulla Nasiruddin
- Mumkin
- Mungerilal Ke Haseen Sapne
- Muskurahat
- Nanhi Si Kali Meri Ladli
- Nargis
- Natkhad Narad
- Neem Ka Ped
- Nirmala
- Noopur
- Noorjahan
- Nukkad
- Om Namah Shivay
- Pachpan Khambein Lal Deewarein
- Paltan
- Palash Ke Phool
- Panaah
- Panchtantra
- Param Vir Chakra
- Parsai Kahte Hai
- Pariksha Guru
- Pavitra Bandhan
- Paying Guest
- Peehar
- Pehchaan
- Phir Subah Hogi
- Phir Wahi Talash
- Phool Khile Hain Gulshan Gulshan
- Phoolwanti
- Piya Ka Aangan
- Police File Se
- Poornima
- Prahari
- Prasad Ki Charchit Kahaniyan
- Pratham Pratishruti
- Puraskar
- Raag Darbari
- Raashi Villa
- Raghukul Reet Sada Chali Aayi
- Raja Aur Rancho
- Raju Aur Udantashtari
- Raja Ka Baja
- Rajani
- Ramayan
- Ranbheri
- Rani Ketki Ki Kahani
- Reporter
- Stree Teri Kahani
- Saat Vachan Saat Phere
- Sabka Malik Ek Hai
- Sabse Bade Ladaiya
- Samandar
- Sammaan Ek Adhikar
- Sangursh
- Sankat Mochan Hanumaan
- Saraswatichandra
- Satyajit Ray Presents
- Sauda
- Sea Hawks
- Shakti
- Shalini
- Shanti
- Shershah Suri
- Shiv Mahapuran
- Shikwah
- Shree Brahma Vishnu Mahesh
- Shri Krishna
- Shrikant
- Sindhugatha
- Singhasan Battisi
- Space City Sigma
- Subah
- Sunehre Din
- Suno Kahani
- Suraag - The Clue
- Surabhi
- Shama
- Surdas
- Super Six
- Swabhimaan
- Swaraj
- Swaraj – Bharat Ke Swatantrata Sangram Ki Samagra Gatha
- Swaraj Nama
- Tales of Panchtantra
- The Sword of Tipu Sultan
- Talaash
- Thhoda Sa Aasmaan
- Jataka Tales
- Tamas
- Tane Bane
- Tehkikaat
- Tehreer Munshi Premchand Ki
- Terah Panne
- Tenali Rama
- Thumri Ek Parampara
- Trayodashi
- Tumhare Liye
- Tum Dena Saath Mera
- Trishna
- Udaan
- Ujale Ki Or
- Uppanyas
- Upanishad Ganga
- Upasana
- Uttar Katha
- Uttar Ramayan
- Ved Vyas Ke Pote
- Vidroh
- Vikram Aur Betaal
- Vishnu Puran
- Vishwamitra
- Vividha
- Wah Janaab
- Woh Hue Na Hamare
- Women of India
- Yatra
- Yeh Dil Mannge More
- Yeh Duniyan Gazab Ki
- Ye Hawayein
- Yeh Zindagi Hai Gulshan
- Your Honour
- Yug
- Yugantar
- Zameen Aasman
- Zindagi
- Sardar: The Game Changer (2024)

==== Hindi dubbed shows ====
- The Adventures of Sherlock Holmes
- Alfred Hitchcock Presents
- Bodyline
- All My Children
- Days of Our Lives
- Faerie Tale Theatre
- Guiding Light
- Oshin
- Star Trek: The Original Series
- Wild Rose
- Los ricos también lloran

=== Reality/non-scripted programming ===
- Aap Aur Hum
- Anmol Ratan
- A Tryst with the People of India
- Baaje Payal
- Bharat ki Chhap
- Bharat Ki Shaan: Singing Star
- Business Batein
- Coke Studio
- Ghoomta Aaina
- Krishi Darshan
- Krazzy Kiya Re
- Kalakarz
- Laajawab Talent Show
- Living on the Edge
- Mashoor Mahal
- Mirza Ghalib: The Playful Muse
- Money Matters
- Porus
- Phool Khile Hai Gulshan Gulshan
- Quiz Time
- Rag Rag Mein Ganga
- Rangarang
- Satyamev Jayate
- Sports Ka Superstar
- Superhit Muqabla
- Stree Shakti
- Sur Sagar
- Taana Baana
- Turning Point
- What's The Good Word?
- Wheel Smart Shrimati
- Zubaan-e-Ishq

==== Hindi dubbed shows ====
- Telematch

=== Films ===
- A Monk/Bodhidharma
- Aadmi Aur Aurat
- Atmajaa
- Bhagat Singh
- Chatrapati Sivaji
- Chhote Bade
- Dakini
- Damyanti
- Ek Pal Ka Sukh
- Hindola
- Daddy
- In Which Annie Gives It Those Ones
- Janam
- Mitro Marjani
- Sadgati
- Sookha
- Panch Parmeshwar
- Pathrai Aankhon Ke Sapne
- Picnic
- Prem Daan
- Seva Sadan
- Somebody Else's Kids
- Thoda Sa Roomani Ho Jayen
- Titli
- Tulsi
- Vilvamangal Ki Pratigya
