= Gham =

Gham may refer to:

- Apni Khushian Apne Gham, Hindi serial airs on TV Asia
- Aur Bhi Gham Hain Zamane Mein, Indian TV serial broadcast fortnightly on Doordarshan in the early 1980s
- Haji Gham, the second highest valley of the Skardu District of Gilgit-Baltistan in Pakistan
- Kabhi Khushi Kabhie Gham, Bollywood film directed by Karan Johar
- Thodi Khushi Thode Gham (some happiness some sadness), an Indian Soap opera on Sony Entertainment Television India
- Yaum e gham (Persian for "Day of Sorrow"), a day commemorated by Shia Muslims
