= Sakhya Re =

- Genre: Family drama
- Written by: Chinmay Mandlekar
- Directed by: Raju Sawant
- Starring: See below
- Country of origin: India
- Original language: Marathi
- No. of episodes: 128

Production
- Producers: Sanjyot Vaidya, Omkar Vaidya, Chinmay Mandlekar
- Running time: 22 minutes
- Production company: Blue Whale Media Production

Original release
- Network: Colors Marathi
- Release: 9 January – 3 June 2017

Sakhya Re is an Indian Marathi language television series aired on Colors Marathi. It is directed by Raju Sawant and produced by Sanjyot Vaidya, Omkar Vaidya, Chinmay Mandlekar under the banner of Blue Whale Media Production. It premiered from 9 January 2017 and ended on 3 June 2017 completing 128 episodes.

== Synopsis ==
Vaidehi and Sameer are deeply in love with each other and are all set to get married. However, their relationship takes a shocking turn when they meet Priyamvada, whose fiance Ranvijay is a complete look-alike of Sameer. Priyamvada requests Sameer to help her find Ranvijay.

== Cast ==
- Rohini Hattangadi as Maasaheb
- Suyash Tilak as Sameer and Ranvijay
- Ruchi Savarn as Priyamvada
- Dnyanada Ramtirthkar as Vaidehi
- Ajay Purkar as Arvind Mirajkar
- Ashwini Kulkarni as Manasi Mirajkar
- Abhishek Bhalerao as Javkar

== Production ==
=== Casting ===
Rohini Hattangadi is coming back on Marathi TV with Sakhya Re. She plays the character of Masasaheb. Actor Suyash Tilak who was last seen Ka Re Durava is also in lead role in 'Sakhya Re'. Ruchi Savarn is also in key role in Sakhya Re. Dnyanada Ramtirthkar is making her debut with this show.
