= Akhilendra Mishra =

Indian film and television actor

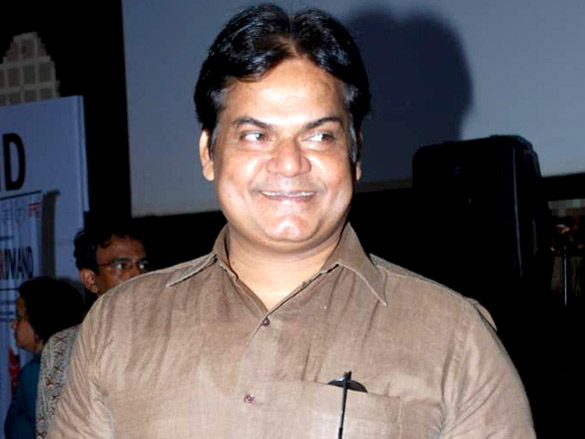
- Born: Siwan, Bihar, India
- Occupation: Actor
- Years active: 1990–present

Akhilendra Mishra is an Indian film and television character actor best known for his role as Kroor Singh in the 1990s Doordarshan fantasy television series Chandrakanta. His other notable works include the character of Mirchi Seth in the 1999 critically acclaimed film Sarfarosh. He also played the character of Arjan in the Academy Award nominated film Lagaan. He played the demon king Ravana in the 2008 television adaptation of the Hindu epic Ramayana.

Mishra played the antagonist opposite Salman Khan in Veergati released in 1995.

== Early life and career ==
Mishra was born in Siwan, Bihar. He did his schooling from Chhapra Zila School and attended Chapra's Rajendra College where he pursued Bachelor of Science in Physics (Honours). Although he wanted to become an engineer, Mishra started doing theatre at a young age with his first role in a Bhojpuri drama based on a story about child marriage titled Gauna Ki Rat. He later joined Indian People's Theatre Association (IPTA) and Ekjut theatre group to learn acting.

Mishra was first seen in Udaan, written and directed by Kavita Chaudhary, in which he did a small role. In 1994, Mishra played Kroor Singh, a character for which he is best known, in the 1990s fantasy television series Chandrakanta.

Mishra's first film was Dharavi in 1993, written-directed by Sudhir Mishra, which won the 1993 National Film Award for Best Feature Film in Hindi, Best Music Direction and Best Editing. He also played Arjan in the Academy Award nominated film Lagaan.

== Filmography ==
- Dharavi (1992)
- Bedardi (1993) – Akhil Mishra
- Veergati (1995) – Ikka
- Do Ankhen Barah Hath (1997) – Ikka
- Sarfarosh (1999) – Mirchi Seth
- Tarkieb (2000) – Bishen Nanda / Killer her hand leg
- Lagaan (2001) – Arjan
- Lal Salaam (2002) – Rathod (Forest Ranger)
- The Legend of Bhagat Singh (2002) – Chandra Shekhar Azad
- Gangaajal (2003) – DSP Bhurelal
- Aanch (2003) – Kalu Pandit
- Parwana (2003) – Police Commissioner Tyagi
- Mumbai Se Aaya Mera Dost (2003) – Priest
- Yeh Dil (2003) – Raghuraj Pratap Singh
- Hulchul (2004) – Surajbhan 'Surya'
- Fida (2004) – Babu Anna
- Deewaar: Let's Bring Our Heroes Home (2004)
- Jaago (2004) – Secy to Home Ministry (IAS officer)
- Veer-Zaara (2004) – Jailor Majid Khan
- Siddu (2005; Kannada film) – Rangegowda
- Apaharan (2005) – CM Brijnath Mishra
- Shikhar (2005) – Irfan bhai
- Ek Ajnabee (2005) – ACP Harvinder 'Harry' Singh
- Ramji Londonwaley (2005) – Mr. Mishra
- Nigehbaan: The Third Eye (2005)
- Utthaan (2006)
- Bhoot Unkle (2006) – Makhan Lal Akela (MLA)
- Shootout at Lokhandwala (2007) – DCP Tripathi
- Aaja Nachle (2007) – Chaudhary Om Singh
- Chamku (2008) – Thakur Mahendra Pratap Singh
- Drona (2008)
- Delhi-6 (2009) – Baba Bandarmaar
- Do Dooni Chaar (2010) – Farooqi
- Musaa (2010)
- Atithi Tum Kab Jaoge? (2010) – Suleman bhai
- Kedi (2010) – Shailendra
- Ready (2011) – Amar Chaudhry
- Married 2 America (2012)
- Once Upon Ay Time In Mumbai Dobaara! (2013) - Bad Guy #2
- Ya Rab (2014) – Maulana Jilani
- Roll No. 56 (Gujarati Film) – Panwala
- Global Baba (2016) – Dallu Yadav
- Kaabil (2017) – Wasim's father
- Anjani Putra (Kannada Movie) (2017) – Raj Thakur
- Billu Ustaad (2018) – (unknown)
- Kaashi in Search of Ganga (2018)
- Jhalki (2019)
- Surya (2023)
- Indian 2 (Tamil film) (2024) – Madanlal Mehta
- The Taj Story (2025) – Vibhooti
- Kis Kisko Pyaar Karoon 2 (2025)
- Raat Akeli Hai: The Bansal Murders (2025) – SP Chauhan
- Indian 3 (Tamil film) (2025) – Madanlal Mehta (Post–production)

== Television ==
- Udaan (TV series) (1990) - Hardayal Singh
- Chandrakanta (TV series) (1995) - Kroor Singh
- Suraag – The Clue (TV series) (1999) - Vivek Malhotra
- Ramayan (TV series) (2008) - Ravana
- Jeet Jayenge Hum (TV series) (2009)
- Devon Ke Dev...Mahadev (TV series) (2012) - Maharaj Bali
- Mann Kee Awaaz Pratigya (TV series) (2012) - Krishna’s Mamaji
- Diya Aur Baati Hum (TV series) (2014)
- Mahabharat (TV series) (2013) - Kamsa
- Tu Mera Hero (TV series) (2014) - Govindnarayan Agarwal
- Khatmal E Ishq (TV series) (2016–2017)
