= Praveen Nischol =

Indian producer, director and writer

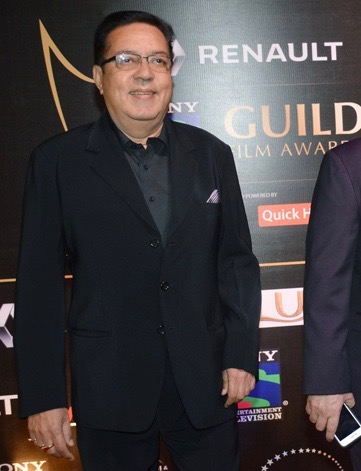
- Nischol in 2016
- Born: November 7, 1948 (age 78); Delhi, India
- Education: St. Stephens
- Occupations: Producer, director and writer
- Years active: 1972–present
- Children: Krishna Jadhav Nischol (son)
- Parent(s): C.L Nischol; Kamla Nischol
- Relatives: Naveen Nischol (brother)

Praveen Nischol (born 7 November 1948) is a producer, director and writer. He has made feature films, TV serials and TV commercials. He is the younger brother of actor Navin Nischol.

== Early life and education ==
Praveen Nischol was born in Delhi and had his early education in Park English School in Calcutta. He shifted to Delhi and finished his schooling at Delhi Public School, where he won many awards in debates and was also given the best actor award at the school's annual day function, by then-President of India Dr. Zakir Hussain.

Nischol did his graduation in BSc from St. Stephen's College in Delhi University. He then joined M.A. in philosophy in Hindu College (Delhi University), but left it halfway and went to Mumbai to work in films and join his brother Navin Nischol, who was then playing the lead man in his first Bollywood movie, Sawan Bhadon.

== Career ==
Nischol started his career as a director with the film Jaan Se Pyara starring Navin, Rekha, Reena Roy, Amjad Khan, and Prem Chopra, with music by R. D. Burman. The movie started with the recording of two songs sung by Asha Bhosle. The special effects of this movie were done by John Dykstra of Apogee Studios, Los Angeles, who had made the epic film Star Wars in partnership with George Lucas. Nischol shot seven reels of the film but then the movie was abandoned by the producer as he ran into financial difficulties which did not allow the film to be taken over by any other production house.

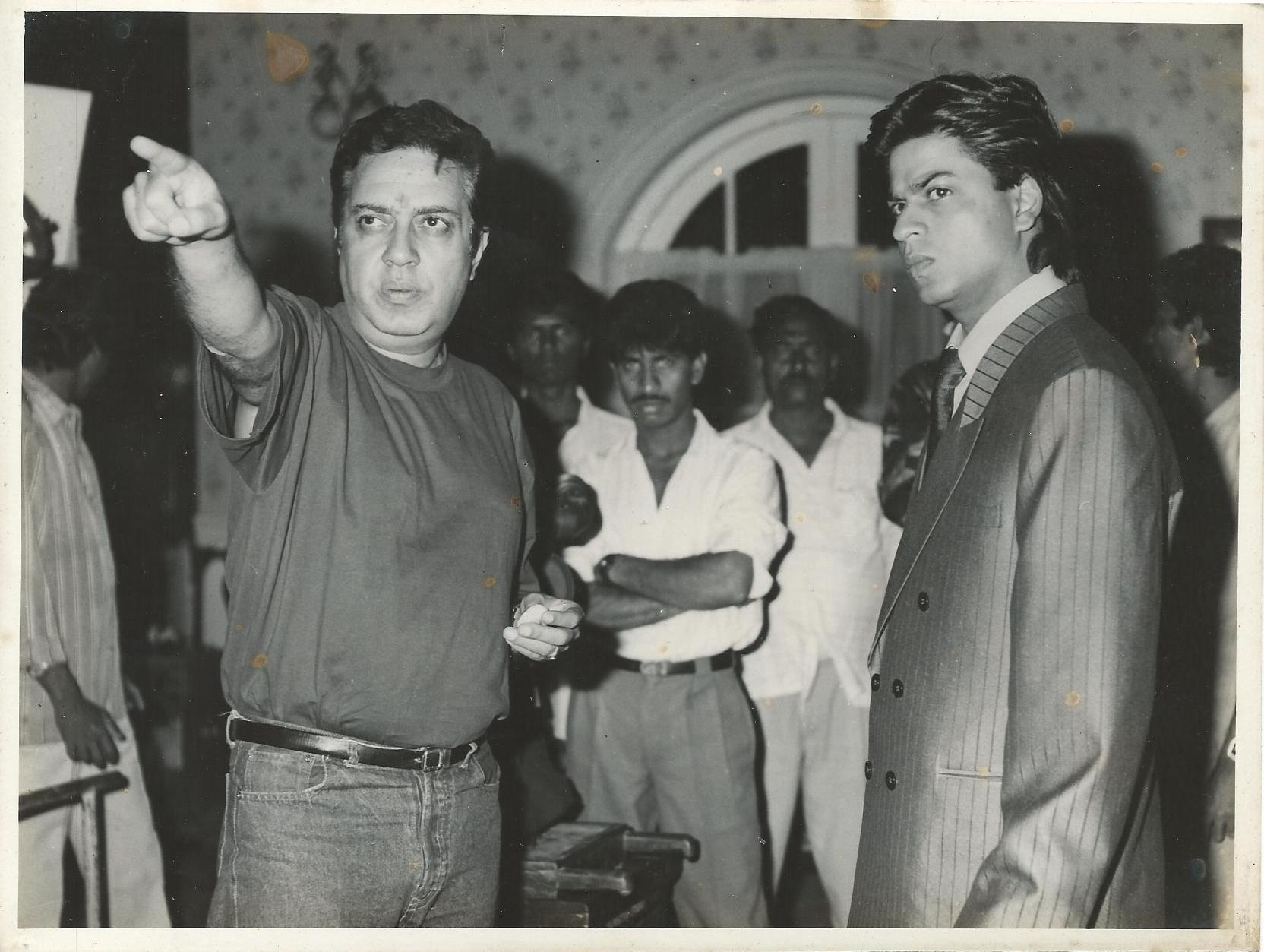
Nischol directing Shah Rukh Khan on the set of English Babu Desi Mem

After this initial setback, Nischol took the rights of the four volumes of the Bengali literary classic Shrikant, by Sarat Chandra Chatterjee. He made the first two volumes into a sponsored TV serial for Doordarshan, called Shrikant, starring Farooque Shaikh, Sujata Mehta, Priyadarshani, and Bharat Bhushan. It was written by Ali Raza, had music by Jaidev, and was produced jointly with Manmohan Shetty and Pradeep Uppoor. The serial consisted of 18 half-hour episodes, and was the first serial to be shot entirely on film. It was a big success and got huge critical acclaim. This was the first Asian serial to feature on Channels 1 and 2 of the BBC.

Nischol made the feature film Rajlaxmi. This was sold to F.C. Mehra, mainly for foreign markets.

Doordarshan then invited Nischol to do the third volume of the classic novel, and commissioned him to make Shrikant II in 24 half-hour episodes. Farooq Sheikh again played the role of Shrikant. Joining him in the cast were Irfan Khan, Mrinal Kulkarni, Ravinder Mankani, and A. K. Hangal.

Nischol then produced and directed the feature film English Babu Desi Mem, starring Shah Rukh Khan, Sonali Bendre, and Saeed Jaffrey.

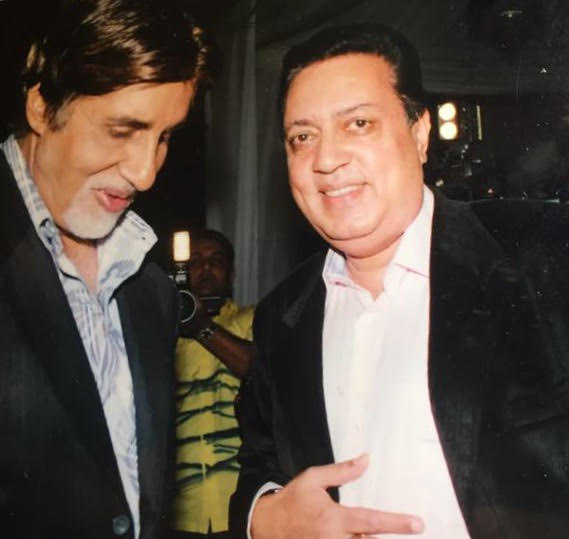
Nischol sharing a lighthearted moment with Amitabh Bachchan at Sarkar Raj music launch

He produced, wrote and directed the TV film Jahan Pyar Miley for the programme Director's Cut on Channel 9.

In 2002 he joined Manmohan Shetty's Company, Adlabs, and started a film production division named Entertainment One. The company funded and co-produced about 20 feature films. The first film it released Gangaajal in 2003, for which Nischol shared the producer's National Award with Prakash Jha.

In 2007 Nischol left Adlabs (which had become Reliance Adlabs), and partnered with Ram Gopal Varma. Together they produced three films. The first was Sarkar Raj, starring Amitabh Bachchan, Abhishek Bachchan and Aishwarya Rai, followed by Contract and Phoonk. They separated in 2009, after which Nischol started the ad film company White Onion Films with two partners, E. Niwas and Ryan Suares, and produced many TV commercials.

Nischol is also writing and producing a feature film.

He also has a line production company which does cost reporting and accounting for films, commercials, and photo shoots.

== Filmography ==
=== Feature Films ===
Name	Role
English Babu Desi Mem	Producer and Director
Contract	Producer
Phoonk	Producer
Sarkar Raj	Producer partner
Rajlakshmi	Director
Singh Is Kinng	Co-producer as CEO of E.O. Adlabs
Love Story 2050	Co-producer as CEO of E.O. Adlabs
Namaste London	Co-producer as CEO of E.O. Adlabs
Khoya Khoya Chand	Co-producer as CEO of E.O. Adlabs
Ram Gopal Varma Ki aag	Co-producer as CEO of E.O. Adlabs
Nishabd	Co-producer as CEO of E.O. Adlabs
Dil Dosti Etc	Co-producer as CEO of E.O. Adlabs
Marigold	Co-producer as CEO of E.O. Adlabs
Mitti Wajaan Maardi	Co-producer as CEO of E.O. Adlabs
Darwaaza Bandh Rakho	Co-producer as CEO of E.O. Adlabs
Shiva	Co-producer as CEO of E.O. Adlabs
Taxi No. 9211	Co-producer as CEO of E.O. Adlabs
Apaharan	Co-producer as CEO of E.O. Adlabs
Waqt	Co-producer as CEO of E.O. Adlabs
Bluffmaster!	Co-producer as CEO of E.O. Adlabs
Dil Jo Bhi Kahey...	Co-producer as CEO of E.O. Adlabs
Dev	Co-producer as CEO of E.O. Adlabs
Main Madhuri Dixit Banna Chahti Hoon	Co-producer as CEO of E.O. Adlabs
Gangaajal	Co-producer as CEO of E.O. Adlabs

=== TV serials ===
Name	Role
Shrikant	Director
Shrikant II	Director
Jahan Pyar Miley	Producer, writer, director
