= Kanchan Chaudhary Bhattacharya =

Indian politician (c.1947–2019)

- Born: c. 1947; Shimla, Himachal Pradesh, India
- Died: 26 August 2019; Mumbai, Maharashtra, India
- Education: Delhi University
- Occupation: IPS Officer (1973–2007)
- Spouse: Dev Bhattacharya
- Children: 2

Kanchan Chaudhary Bhattacharya (c. 1947 - 26 August 2019) was the second woman officer in Indian Police Service (IPS) in India, the first being Kiran Bedi. A 1973 batch IPS officer, she was the first woman to become Director General of Police (Head of Police Force) of a state and retired on 31 October 2007 after 33 years of service. She then turned to politics and ran as a candidate of Aam Aadmi Party from Haridwar, Uttarakhand in the 2014 Indian general election.

== Early life and education ==
Chaudhary was born in Himachal and lived in Amritsar and Delhi. She was the first child of Madan Mohan Chaudhary. Chaudhary attended the Government College for Women, Amritsar. Later, Kanchan completed her Master of Arts (MA) in English Literature from Indraprastha College, Delhi University, followed by a Master of Business Administration (MBA) degree from the University of Wollongong, New South Wales, Australia in 1993.

In an interview in 2014, Kanchan explains that she was inspired to become a police officer after her father was caught up in a property matter and was attacked; at that time police officers were not ready to register a case against the attackers. So when she cleared the Civil Services exams, it was clear to her that she would join the Indian Police Services as a path to serving justice.

== Career ==
Chaudhary's career in the Indian Police Services spanned 33 years. She was the second woman (after Kiran Bedi) to become an IPS officer. In her batch she was the only female trainee. She was the first woman to be an IPS officer in Uttar Pradesh and was the first woman appointed Deputy Inspector General of Police in Bareilly, Uttar Pradesh. She was then promoted to be the first woman Inspector General of the Uttar Pradesh Police. She was the first woman to serve as the Additional Director General of Police in Uttaranchal and then was the first woman promoted to be the Director General of Police in the state.

Cases that Chaudhary handled in her career included the murder of seven-time national badminton champion Syed Modi in 1987 and the Reliance-Bombay Dyeing case in 1989. During her time as Assistant Superintendent of Police, Malihabad, Uttar Pradesh, she tracked down 13 dacoits in a single year. She also investigated several white collar crimes in banks and public sectors.

Chaudhary was selected to represent India at the 2004 Interpol meeting in Cancún, Mexico. She hosted the 2nd Women in Police Conference on 27 July 2005 in Mussoorie, where the President of India, APJ Abdul Kalam, was the chief guest. Chaudhary presented on the issues relating to the recruitment, training and continuing of women in police in India at the DGP's Annual Conference and to the Training Heads from across the country on behalf of the Bureau of Police Research and Development.

Chaudhary's other interests included writing poetry and participating in dramatics. She also made a guest appearance on the TV series Udaan, which was inspired by her life story. The series was written and directed by her sister Kavita Chaudhary.

== Death ==
On 26 August 2019, Bhattacharya died at a hospital in Mumbai where she had been receiving care during the previous five to six months. Her body was cremated at the Worli crematorium in Mumbai. She was survived by her husband and two daughters. Uttarakhand Police Director General Law and Order Ashok Kumar paid tribute to Bhattacharya stating, "She was a simple and sweet-natured person who gave us a free hand while we worked under her when she was the DGP." An official tribute event was held at the department's headquarters on August 27.

== Awards ==
- President's Medal for Long and Meritorious Services in 1989.
- President's Medal for Distinguished Services in 1997.
- Rajiv Gandhi Award for Excellent All Round Performance and as an Outstanding Woman Achiever, 2004.
