= Star One Horror Nights =

Indian television horror series

- Genre: Horror, Thriller
- Screenplay by: Sameer Modi
- Story by: Aditya Narain Singh
- Directed by: Pavan Kaul/Avdhesh Yadav
- Country of origin: India
- Original language: Hindi
- No. of seasons: 1
- No. of episodes: 52

Production
- Editors: K. Rajgopal; Chandan Singh
- Running time: 40 min
- Production companies: Reliance Big Productions; Shri Jagannath Entertainment

Original release
- Network: Star One
- Release: 22 May – 14 November 2010

Star One Horror Nights is an Indian horror drama television series that aired on Star One. It used to air at 9.30 p.m. every Saturday and Sunday on Star One.

== Cast ==
- Rashmi Singh
- Sreejita De
- Mamik Singh
- Chandana Sharma
- Riddhi Dogra
- Alihassan Turabi
- Himanshu Malhotra

== Episode list ==
- Episode 1 Manhoos Aatma
- Episode 2 Manhoos Aatma 2
- Episode 3 Khandar
- Episode 4 Khandar 2
- Episode 5 Saat peedhi Purane Pendant ka Raaz part 1
- Episode 6 Saat peedhi Purane Pendant ka Raaz part 2
- Episode 7 Friendship Band
- Episode 8 Friendship Band 2
- Episode 9 Aaina
- Episode 10 aaina
- Episode 11 Haunted Hospital
- Episode 12 Haunted Hospital 2
- Episode 13 Aashiq Aatma
- Episode 14 Aashiq Aatma 2
- Episode 15 Story Writer
- Episode 16 Story Writer 2
- Episode 17 Bhatakati Aatmayen
- Episode 18 Bhatakati Aatmayen 2
- Episode 19 Qismat
- Episode 20 Qismat 2
- Episode 21 Tara
- Episode 22 Tara 2
- Episode 23 Daksha Sur 666 part 1
- Episode 24 Daksha Sur 666 Part 2
- Episode 25 Shruti Revenge
- Episode 26 Shruti Revenge 2
- Episode 27 Didi
- Episode 28 Didi 2
- Episode 29 Karmik Ghost
- Episode 30 Karmik Ghost 2
- Episode 31 Nandita Revenge
- Episode 32 Nandita Revenge 2
- Episode 33 Tantrik Ka Vardan
- Episode 34 Tantrik Ka Vardan 2
- Episode 35 Khoon Ka Badla Khoon
- Episode 36 Khoon Ka Badla Khoon 2
- Episode 37 Tujko Aana Hi Hoga
- Episode 38 Tujko Aana Hi Hoga 2
- Episode 39 Tujko Aana Hi Hoga 3
- Episode 40 Tujko Aana Hi Hoga 4
- Episode 41 Tujko Aana Hi Hoga 5
- Episode 42 Tujko Aana Hi Hoga 6
- Episode 43 Tujko Aana Hi Hoga 7
- Episode 44 Tujko Aana Hi Hoga 8
- Episode 45 Tujko Aana Hi Hoga 9
- Episode 46 Tujko Aana Hi Hoga 10
- Episode 47 Tujko Aana Hi Hoga 11
- Episode 48 Tujko Aana Hi Hoga 12
- Episode 49 Tujko Aana Hi Hoga 13
- Episode 50 Tujko Aana Hi Hoga 14
- Episode 51 Tujko Aana Hi Hoga 15
- Episode 52 Tujko Aana Hi Hoga 16
