= English Babu Desi Mem =

- Poster
- Directed by: Praveen Nischol
- Written by: G.M. Ayaz; Ali Raza
- Produced by: Praveen Nischol
- Starring: Shah Rukh Khan; Sonali Bendre; Mushtaq Khan
- Cinematography: Ravikant Reddy
- Edited by: V.N. Mayekar
- Music by: Nikhil–Vinay
- Production company: Daasa Movies
- Distributed by: Daasa Movies
- Release date: 26 January 1996
- Running time: 156 minutes
- Country: India
- Language: Hindi
- Budget: ₹3.5 crore
- Box office: ₹6.89 crore

English Babu Desi Mem (transl. English sir, Indian madam) is a 1996 Indian Hindi-language romantic comedy film directed by Praveen Nischol (in his directorial debut). The film stars Shah Rukh Khan in a triple role as father and twin sons, alongside Sonali Bendre. It is loosely based on the American romantic comedy It Started in Naples (1960). The rights to this film are now owned by Shah Rukh Khan's Red Chillies Entertainment.

== Plot ==
Gopal Mayur is a billionaire businessman. He is the head of the Mayur family, a rich NRI business family, living in London for five generations. He has two sons. The elder son, Hari, is a registered pilot with a deep affection for his ancestral India, spending much of his time at Mini India, on the outskirt of London. Gopal, who is seemingly not a fan of India, and is not impressed by the fact that his son is so fond of their ancestral country, has promised his English business partner that Hari will marry the latter's daughter, who holds an affection for Hari. However, Hari does not want to marry an Englishwoman and pleads with his family to call off the wedding, but nobody listens to him. On his wedding day, he runs away from his home and boards a plane, in order to escape to India. His plane crashes in Indian Ocean, and he is presumed dead by everyone.

Hari, however, washes ashore in Mumbai, still alive, and is found by a little girl named Bijuriya and her elder sister Katariya. Katariya restores him to health, by nursing him and taking care of him affectionately. After his recovery, Hari learns that he has been officially declared dead by the British Government, after a rescue mission failed to find his body. He takes this opportunity to start a new life in his beloved India, marrying Katariya, whom he has fallen in love with.

Katariya soon becomes pregnant with Hari's child. The happiness does not last for long, as a fire breaks out at their house during a Diwali celebration, mortally wounding Hari and Katariya, who both die shortly after the delivery of their son, Nandlal Mayur aka Nandu. Bijuriya sacrifices her own education to raise Nandu, performing multiple activities in order to earn money to feed him, before settling down with a job as a bar dancer.

Eight years later, Vikram Mayur, Gopal's younger son, who also holds a negative view on India, has succeeded his father as the president, chairman and owner of his family industries (while it is not revealed what happened to Gopal, who is never shown in the movie again). He soon becomes a successful and wealthy industrialist. Lawyer Madadgar, a family friend of Bijuriya and Katariya, watches an interview of Vikram on television, and realizes that he is Hari's younger brother and Nandu's uncle. He plots to bring him to India, in order to take away both Bijuriya and Nandu with him. He files a case against Hari, forcing Vikram to come to Mumbai, out of confusion.

Vikram learns that his brother survived the plane crash and lived in India for two years, during which he was married and had a son, before his actual death with his wife. Vikram believes that his brother's son is the next generation of their family industry, and so he should be taken back to London. Bijuriya, who dearly loves Nandu and does not want to part with him, objects to this. Bijuriya realizes that if Vikram goes to court, she will lose Nandu forever, and so she pretends to be Queen Rani Devi, who was Nandu's guardian. Vikram falls for her charade and slowly falls in love with her. But one day, her truth is exposed to him. Vikram decides to take his nephew back with him immediately. The nephew, who detests his newfound uncle and adores his aunt like a mother figure, protests this, but Vikram remains adamant.

Bijuriya forces Nandu to go with Vikram after getting to know that Nandu misses school and does petty jobs to earn money to marry off Bijuriya. She is forcibly taken to sleep with a goon Bheema Khalasi, who had his eyes on her. When Vikram learns about this, he comes to the hideout just before Bheema Khalasi is about to rape Bijuriya. Vikram overpowers the goon and saves Bijuriya. He is convinced that Bijuriya will be the best parent for his nephew. Vikram marries Bijuriya and takes her and his nephew back with him.

== Cast ==
- Shah Rukh Khan in a triple role as
  - Gopal Mayur, Vikram and Hari's father.
  - Hari Mayur, Gopal's elder son.
  - Vikram Mayur, Gopal's younger son.
- Sonali Bendre as Bijuriya
- Mushtaq Khan as Hitman, the antagonist
- Kiran Kumar as Bheema Khalasi
- Saeed Jaffrey as Lawyer Madadgar
- Vivek Vaswani as Waiter
- Sudhir Dalvi as Doctor
- Rajeshwari Sachdev as Katariya Mayur, Hari's wife and Bijuriya's sister
- Anju Mahendru as TV Interviewer
- Arhhan Singh as Nandlal Mayur "Nandu" / Master Mayur, Hari and Katariya's son

== Soundtrack ==
The soundtrack was composed by Nikhil–Vinay. The album features 7 songs sung by Kumar Sanu, Asha Bhosle, Udit Narayan, Kavita Krishnamurthy, Poornima, Alka Yagnik, Vinod Rathod, Jolly Mukherjee etc.

#	Song	Singer
1.	"Deewana Main Tera"	Kumar Sanu, Alka Yagnik
2.	"Kaise Mukhde Se"	Asha Bhosle
3.	"O Bijuria Sun"	Udit Narayan, Alka Yagnik, Jolly Mukherjee
4.	"Dhol Baje Khuddam"	Vinod Rathod, Alka Yagnik
5.	"Bharatpur Loot Gaya"	Poornima
6.	"Na Tere Bina"	Kavita Krishnamurthy
7.	"Love Me Honey"	Udit Narayan, Poornima

== Box office ==
English Babu Desi Mem grossed ₹6.40 crore (US$660,000) in India and $135,000 (₹49.61 lakh) in other countries, for a worldwide total of ₹6.89 crore (US$720,000), against its ₹3.50 crore (US$360,000) budget. It had a worldwide opening weekend of ₹1.69 crore (US$180,000), and grossed ₹50.32 crore (US$5.2 million) in its first week. It is the third highest-grossing film of 1996 worldwide.

=== India ===
The film opened on Friday, 26 January 1996, across 145 screens, and earned ₹31 lakh (US$32,000) nett on its opening day. It grossed ₹1 crore (US$100,000) nett in its opening weekend, and had a first week of ₹1.64 crore (US$170,000) nett. The film earned a total of ₹3.78 crore (US$390,000) nett, and was declared a "Flop" by Box Office India.

=== Overseas ===
It earned $135,000 (₹49.61 lakh) outside India. Overseas, it was the 3rd-highest-grossing film of 1996.

English Babu Desi Mem worldwide collections breakdown
Territory	Territory wise collections break-up
India	Net gross: ₹3.78 crore (US$390,000)
India	Distributor share: ₹1.82 crore (US$190,000)
India	Total gross: ₹84.2 crore (US$8.7 million)
International (outside India)	$5,650,532 (₹6,000,000lakh)
Worldwide	₹92.3 crore (US$9.6 million)
