= Rishta Ho To Aisa =

- Theatrical release poster
- Directed by: Kalptaru
- Written by: Kader Khan (dialogues)
- Produced by: M.M.C. Cooper
- Starring: Jeetendra; Rishi Kapoor; Juhi Chawla; Sujata Mehta
- Music by: Laxmikant–Pyarelal
- Production company: Marco Enterprises
- Release date: 1992
- Running time: 133 minutes
- Country: India
- Language: Hindi

Rishta Ho To Aisa (transl. Relation Means This) is a 1992 Indian Hindi-language drama film, produced by M.M.C. Cooper on the Marco Enterprises banner and directed by Kalptaru. Starring Jeetendra, Rishi Kapoor, Juhi Chawla, Sujata Mehta and music composed by Laxmikant–Pyarelal.

== Cast ==
- Jeetendra as Rajesh
- Rishi Kapoor as Vijay
- Juhi Chawla as Seema
- Sujata Mehta as Sharda
- Paresh Rawal as Kalicharan
- Kader Khan as Girdharilal
- Swapna as Mohini
- Ashok Saraf as Balram
- Sharat Saxena as Kirti

== Soundtrack ==
#	Title	Singer(s)
1	"O Shamma Tera Parwana"	Anuradha Paudwal, Shabbir Kumar
2	"Jeene Ka Zamana Hai"	Mohammed Aziz, Shobha Joshi
3	"Dilbar Ho Sanam Ho"	Kavita Krishnamurthy, Suresh Wadkar
4	"Rukja Kidher Chamakti Chali"	Mohammad Aziz, Alka Yagnik
5	"Wallah Kya Baat Hai"	Alka Yagnik, Sudesh Bhonsle
