= Baapmanus =

Indian regional TV soap

- Genre: Drama
- Written by: Swapnil Gangurde; Charudutt Bhagwat
- Directed by: Harshad Paranjpe
- Starring: Ravindra Mankani; Suyash Tilak; Shruti Atre; Pallavi Patil; Sangram Samel
- Voices of: Divya Kumar
- Music by: Rahul Suhas; Vaibhav Deshmukh (Lyrics)
- Opening theme: Baapmanus by Rahul Suhas
- Country of origin: India
- Original language: Marathi
- No. of episodes: 291

Production
- Producers: Sanjay Bhagwat Zankar; Gaurav Avinash Ponkshe
- Cinematography: Kumar Gauda
- Camera setup: Multi-camera
- Running time: 22 minutes
- Production company: Film Positives

Original release
- Network: Zee Yuva
- Release: 18 December 2017 – 17 November 2018

Baapmanus is an Indian Marathi television daily soap opera that is aired on Zee Yuva. The show stars Ravindra Mankani, Suyash Tilak in lead roles. The show premiered on Zee Yuva on 18 December 2017.

== Cast ==
- Ravindra Mankani as Dadasaheb Zujarrao
- Suyash Tilak as Surya, Dadasaheb's younger son
- Pooja Pawar-Salunkhe as Aaisaheb, Dadasaheb's wife, Chandra, Surya and Radha's mother
- Pallavi Patil as Nisha, Ramakantrao's elder daughter
- Sangram Samel as Harshawardhan Rajwardhan Sabnis
- Shruti Atre as Geeta, Shabbir's daughter, Surya's love interest
- Abhijeet Shwetachandra as Chandra, Dadasaheb's elder son, Shilpa's husband, Ira's father
- Sanjay Kulkarni as Ramakantrao
- Anand Prabhu as Raghuveer
- Namrata Awate as Sujata
- Amol Deshmukh as Shabir
- Jyoti Patil as Shilpa
- Maithili Patwardhan as Ira
- Ajay Purkar
- Abhilasha Patil

== Development ==
Suyash Tilak who portrays the character of Surya in the show had tagged #baapmanus on his Twitter account and had set a trend to tell about the Baapmanus i.e. to post about the great person in each one's life who guides them on right path and later on 24 November 2017 he revealed that Baapmanus was an upcoming serial on Zee Yuva.
