= Suyash Tilak =

Indian film and television actor

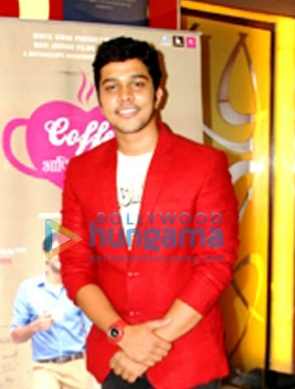
- At launch of Coffee Ani Barach Kahi
- Born: 10 January 1989 (age 37); Pune, Maharashtra, India
- Occupation: Actor
- Years active: 2010–present
- Known for: Durva; Ka Re Durava; Sakhya Re; Baapmanus; Shubhmangal Online
- Spouse: Aayushi Bhave (m. 2021; div. 2025)

Suyash Tilak (born 10 January 1989) is an Indian film and television actor. He is known for playing Jayram Khanolkar in Ka Re Durava and also in Baapmanus, Sakhya Re, Durva and Shubhmangal Online.

== Early life and career ==
Suyash was born on 10 January 1989 in Pune, Maharashtra. He completed his education as an Environmentalist from Fergusson University in Pune. His television debut was on the Zee Marathi serial Amarprem. In 2011, He did a small role in Pudhcha Paaul. In 2013, He played the lead role in Durva. In 2014, he took on a lead role as Jayram in Ka Re Durava. In 2017, He has appeared in Sakhya Re. In the same year he appeared in Baapmanus a serial on Zee Yuva. In 2020, he featured in Khaali Peeli and in Shubhmangal Online a TV series on Colors Marathi.

== Personal life ==
Tilak is married to Aayushi Bhave.

== Media image ==
Most Desirable Men of Maharashtra
Sponsor	Year	Rank			
Sponsor	Year	TV	Ref.	Film	Ref.
The Times of India, Maharashtra Times	2017	–	–	13	
The Times of India, Maharashtra Times	2018	10		18	
The Times of India, Maharashtra Times	2019	–	–	27	
The Times of India, Maharashtra Times	2020	10		–	–

== Filmography ==
=== Films ===
Year	Title	Language	Role
2014	Bhakarkhadi 7 km	Marathi	
2015	Classmates	Marathi	Amit
2015	Coffee Ani Barach Kahi	Marathi	Nikhil
2016	Ticha Umbartha	Marathi	
2017	Langar Ek Paash	Marathi	
2017	Divas Ha Majha	Marathi	
2020	Khaali Peeli	Hindi	Mangesh
2021	Hashtag Prem	Marathi	Malhar Kulkarni

=== Television ===
Year	Title	Role	Channel	Ref.
2009–2010	Amarprem	Sameer Inamdar	Zee Marathi	
2011–2012	Bandh Reshmache	Aditya Brahmapurikar	Star Pravah	
2011–2013	Pudhcha Paaul	Rohit Sardeshmukh	Star Pravah	
2013–2014	Durva	Bhupati Patil	Star Pravah	
2014–2016	Ka Re Durava	Jayram Khanolkar	Zee Marathi	
2017	Sakhya Re	Sameer & Ranvijay	Colors Marathi	
2017–2018	Baapmanus	Surya Zunjarrao	Zee Yuva	
2018	Chhoti Malkin	Sam	Star Pravah	
2019	Ek Ghar Mantarlela	Kshitij Nimbalkar	Zee Yuva	
2020–2021	Shubhmangal Online	Shantanu Sadavarte	Colors Marathi	
2023	Lokmanya	Vasudev Balwant Phadke	Zee Marathi	
2023	Jivachi Hotiya Kahili	Kartik Devraj	Sony Marathi	
2023	Jau Nako Dur... Baba	Dr. Nachiket	Sun Marathi	
2023–2024	Aboli	Sachit Raje	Star Pravah	

== Theatre ==
- Strawberry – 2016
- Mi, Swara Aani Te Dogha — 2021

== Webseries ==
- Shock Katha (2017)
- Twist Eat (2018)
- Boomerang (2019)
