= Dnyanada Ramtirthkar =

Indian actress (born 1996)

- Born: 26 June 1996 (age 30); Sangli, Maharashtra, India
- Occupation: Actress
- Years active: 2016-present
- Known for: Thipkyanchi Rangoli
- Spouse: Harshad Gaikwad (m. 2026)

Dnyanada Ramtirthkar (born 26 June 1996) is an Indian television and film actress. She made her television debut with Sakhya Re (2017), and her debut in film with Dhurala (2020). In 2021, she portrayed a role of "Apoorva" in Star Pravah's Thipkyanchi Rangoli.

== Early life ==
Ramtirthkar was born in Vita, Sangli. However, she currently lives in Pune and Mumbai. She completed her secondary education in Pune from P.E.S. Modern Girls High School. For higher studies, she attended Marathwada Mitramandal College of Commerce, where she studied Commerce.

== Filmography ==
=== Television ===
| Year | Show | Role | Channel | Ref. |
|---|---|---|---|---|
| 2017 | Sakhya Re | Vaidehi | Colors Marathi | |
| 2017 | Zindagi Not Out | Sneha | Zee Yuva | |
| 2018 | Shatada Prem Karave | Sayali | Star Pravah | |
| 2019 | Year Down | Sanyukta | Sony Marathi | |
| 2021 | Shaadi Mubarak | Purti | StarPlus | |
| 2021-2023 | Thipkyanchi Rangoli | Apoorva Shashank Kanitkar | Star Pravah | |
| 2022 | Aata Hou De Dhingana | Contestant | Star Pravah | |
| 2024-present | Lagnanantar Hoilach Prem | Kavya Parth Deshmukh | Star Pravah | |

=== Feature films ===
| Year | Title | Language | Role | Ref(s) |
|---|---|---|---|---|
| 2020 | Dhurala | Marathi | Divya Babar | |
| 2021 | Dil Dosti Duniyadari | Marathi | Anjana | |
| 2021 | D3: Dosti Dil Dhokha | Telugu language | Anjana | |
