= Gunaah (1993 film) =

- Theatrical release poster
- Directed by: Mahesh Bhatt
- Screenplay by: Akash Khurana
- Dialogues by: B. R. Ishara
- Story by: Akash Khurana
- Produced by: Paresh Bagbahara
- Starring: Sunny Deol; Dimple Kapadia; Sujata Mehta; Soni Razdan; Raza Murad
- Cinematography: Nadeem Khan
- Edited by: Dimpy Bahl
- Music by: Rajesh Roshan
- Production company: Chitralaya Movietone
- Release date: 8 October 1993
- Running time: 126 minutes
- Country: India
- Language: Hindi

Gunaah (transl. Sin) is a 1993 Indian Hindi-language crime drama film directed by Mahesh Bhatt. It stars Sunny Deol, Dimple Kapadia, Sujata Mehta, Soni Razdan and Raza Murad.

== Plot ==
Ravi Soni, a tenacious journalist, is found badly injured and unconscious by fishermen off the coast of Goa. A kind doctor, Dr. Joe D'Costa, saves his life, but Ravi has suffered a complete loss of memory. For five years, he lives with the fishermen, a man without a past, haunted by fragmented dreams and a vague sense of unease.

His memory is finally jolted back to life when he has a chance encounter with someone who knows him. Ravi's past rushes back to him, revealing that he was a successful journalist tasked with exposing the corruption of a powerful politician, Mahendra Singh. Ravi's reporting, based on information provided by his sources, led to Mahendra Singh's public disgrace and eventual death.

However, the complete picture of his past is far more complex and sinister. Ravi soon realizes that he was a pawn in a larger game. He discovers that Mahendra Singh was, in fact, an honest and principled man who had been framed by his rivals. Ravi's work, which he believed was an act of public service, was actually a major gunaah (sin) that ruined an innocent man's and led to his death.

Overwhelmed with guilt, Ravi decides to right the wrong he committed unintentionally. He also learns that the woman he loved, Kavita, is Mahendra Singh's daughter. He tracks her down, only to find that she is now married to Dr. Ashok Khanna and harbors a deep hatred for Ravi who she believes is responsible for her father's downfall. To make matters worse, Dr. Khanna has been falsely framed for murder and is facing the death penalty.

The rest of the film follows Ravi's relentless pursuit of the truth. He must navigate a dangerous web of deceit and political corruption to find the real perpetrators who framed Mahendra Singh and are now targeting his family. Ravi's mission is not only to clear his own name and seek justice but also to regain the affection and trust of Kavita, who sees him as the cause of her family's misery. He is helped in his mission by Rita, whose elder sister, Gloria, had also got murdered in this sinister web. The story's climax involves Ravi confronting the true villains, bringing them to justice, and finally earning his redemption.

== Cast ==
- Sunny Deol as Ravi Soni
- Dimple Kapadia as Kavita Singh – Ravi’s girlfriend, eventually Ashok’s wife
- Sujata Mehta as Rita Pinto – Gloria’s younger sister, Ravi’s friend
- Soni Razdan as Gloriya Pinto – Rita’s elder sister
- Raza Murad as Rama Patil
- Sumeet Saigal as Dr. Ashok Khanna – Kavita’s eventual husband
- Anang Desai as Rai
- Avtar Gill as Rama's Assistant
- Manohar Singh as Dr. Joe D'Costa
- Akash Khurana as Mahendra Singh – Kavita’s father
- Mushtaq Khan as Hotel Manager
- Anjana Mumtaz as Mrs. Khanna

== Music and soundtrack ==
The film’s music was composed by Rajesh Roshan. The lyrics of the songs were penned by Neeraj and Payam Sayeedi.

Song	Singer
"Yeh Raat, Yeh Tanhaiyan"	Sadhana Sargam, Amit Kumar
"Ek Musafir Hoon Main, Ek Musafir Hai Tu"	Sadhana Sargam, Manhar Udhas
"Ek Bhalu Ki Suno" (version 1)	Mohammed Aziz
"Ek Bhalu Ki Suno" (version 2)	Mohammed Aziz
"Jani Jani Jani Jani"	Kavita Krishnamurthy
