= Babul Ki Duwayen Leti Jaa =

- Created by: Shobhana Desai
- Written by: Jayesh Patil; Radheshyam Rai; Sushma Bakshi
- Directed by: Aziz Khan; Satish Rajavade; Kamal Monga
- Starring: Kishwer Merchant see below
- Country of origin: India
- Original language: Hindi
- No. of episodes: 220

Production
- Producer: Shobhana Desai
- Running time: approx. 24 minutes

Original release
- Network: Zee TV
- Release: 2000 – 2001

Babul Ki Duwayen Leti Jaa is an Indian soap opera produced by Shobhana Desai, and aired on Zee TV channel from 2000 to 2001. The story is based on the lives' of 5 girls and their dreams to accomplish something big in their lives'.

== Cast ==
- Moonmoon Banerjee as Sheetal
- Kishwer Merchant as Malvika
- Tasneem Sheikh as Naina
- Narayani Shastri as Jenny
- Shweta Agarwal as Preeti
  - Chandni Toor replaced Agarwal as Preeti
- Kainaaz Pervez as Renu
- Ami Trivedi as Mona: Sheetal's sister
- Ravi Khanvilkar as Sheetal Father
- Arun Bali as Malvika's father
- Nandita Thakur as Malvika Mother
- Ajit Vachani as Naina's father
- Charusheela Sable as Naina's mother
- Vandana Gupte as Naina's step-mother
- Sudhir Dalvi as Preeti's maternal uncle
- Sulabha Deshpande as Preeti's maternal Aunty
- Mohan Bhandari as Renu's father
- Zarina Wahab as Professor Nafisa Siddiqui: Mona's professor
- Firoz Ali as Dr. Aditya Sheetal's fiancé
