= Family Full House with Rohit Sharma =

Indian television show

- Genre: Talk show; Game show
- Based on: Family Feud by Mark Goodson
- Directed by: Arun Seshkumar
- Starring: Rohit Sharma
- Country of origin: India
- Original language: Hindi
- No. of seasons: 1
- No. of episodes: 18

Production
- Camera setup: Multi-camera
- Running time: 60–70 minutes
- Production company: Fremantle India Television Productions

Original release
- Network: Sony Entertainment Television
- Release: 19 September 2026 – present

Family Full House with Rohit Sharma is an Indian Hindi language talk and game show that airs on Sony Entertainment Television. Hosted by cricketer Rohit Sharma, the programme premiered on 19 September 2026.

== Cast ==
Rohit Sharma at an event.

- Rohit Sharma as Host.

== Background ==
It is a weekly, family-oriented show. It features various celebrities and sportpersons to compete in interactive, survey-based trivia games and humorous challenges. The former India national cricket team captain, Rohit Sharma, made his television debut as the host of this show.

The show is an Indian adaptation of American television game show Family Feud, produced by Fremantle India Television Productions, and directed by Arun Seshkumar.

== Overview ==
The official trailer for the show was released on 31 August 2026, featuring some signature humorous lines from Rohit Sharma. The show began airing on Sony Entertainment Television (SET) and SonyLIV on 19 September 2026.

== Episodes ==
No.	Guest(s)	Date of broadcast	Note	Ref
1	Kunal Kemmu, Vanshika Dhir, Sparsh Srivastava, Dinesh Lal Yadav	19 September 2026	Cast of Vibe	
1	Shreyas Iyer, Abhishek Nayar, Shardul Thakur	19 September 2026	Players of India national cricket team	
2	Siddharth Malhotra, Tamanna Bhatia, Sulabha Arya, Arunabh Kumar, Bosco Martis, Deepak Kumar Mishra, Anup Soni, Shweta Tiwari	20 September 2026	Cast of The Vvaan: Force of the Forrest	
3	Shikhar Dhawan, Maniesh Paul, Sanyukta Paul, Anantika Sahir, Sudeep Sahir, Sophie Shine, Mahendra Pal Dhawan	26 September 2026		
4	Suniel Shetty, Neha Dhupia, Angad Bedi	27 September 2026		
5	Rakesh Bedi, Archana Puran Singh	3 October 2026		
6	Bharti Singh, Haarsh Limbachiyaa	4 October 2026	Hosts of Indian Game Show	
6	Jannat Zubair Rahmani, Chandan Prabhakar, Abhishek Kumar, Anita Hassanandani Reddy, Manisha Rani, Pinky Singh	4 October 2026		
7	Krushna Abhishek, Ankita Lokhande	10 October 2026		
8	Neena Gupta, Arjun Bijlani, Helly Shah, Delnaaz Irani, Deven Bhojani, Jamnadas Majethia, Anant Joshi, Aatish Kapadia	11 October 2026	Cast of Chumbak	
9	Mika Singh, Shehnaaz Gill	17 October 2026		
9	Surabhi Mehra, Samriddhi Mehra	17 October 2026	Twin sister Chinki-Minki	
10	Neha Kakkar, Abhijeet Sawant, Amit Sana	18 October 2026		
11	Karishma Kapoor, Aadar Jain, Armaan Jain, Anissa Malhotra, Chunky Panday, Neelam Kothari, Samir Soni, Sandiip Sikcand	24 October 2026		
12	Udit Narayan, Aditya Narayan, Shweta Agarwal, Deepa Gahatraj, Remo D'Souza, Geeta Kapur, Mukesh Chhabra	25 October 2026		
13	Aasif Sheikh, Ali Asgar, Kishwer Merchant, Nyuaan Asgar, Karan Wahi, Sharad Kelkar, Rahul Lohani, Prachin Chauhan	31 October 2026		
14	Rajpal Yadav, Kiku Sharda, Paritosh Tripathi, Hemant Pandey, Gaurav Gera	1 November 2026		
