= Jung (1996 film) =

1996 Indian film by T. Rama Rao

- Poster
- Directed by: T. Rama Rao
- Screenplay by: Santosh Suraj
- Produced by: Rajiv Babbar
- Starring: Mithun Chakraborty; Aditya Pancholi; Ajay Devgn; Vani Viswanath; Rambha; Sadashiv Amrapurkar; Tinnu Anand; Sujata Mehta
- Cinematography: Jayanan Vincent
- Edited by: Gautham Raju
- Music by: Nadeem-Shravan
- Production company: A. Saptarishi Films
- Release date: 19 April 1996
- Running time: 156 minutes
- Language: Hindi

Jung (transl. Battle) is a 1996 Indian Hindi-language action drama film, starring Mithun Chakraborty and Aditya Pancholi (in double role) Ajay Devgn, Rambha, Sadashiv Amrapurkar, Tinnu Anand and Sujata Mehta. The film was a hit and last major successful film of Director T.Rama Rao.

== Plot ==
Jung has Mithun and Ajay Devgn playing brothers, but due to circumstances, police officer Mithun had to cross swords with his brother to protect justice. The third angle of the film is the double role portrayed by Aditya Pancholi, one negative and the positive.

== Cast ==
- Mithun Chakraborty as ACP Arjun Saxena
- Aditya Pancholi as Engine Driver Ram / Billa (dual role)
- Ajay Devgan as Ajay Bahadur Saxena
- Rambha as Madhu
- Vani Viswanath as Laxmi Saxena, ACP Arjun's wife.
- Sujata Mehta as Sita
- Sadashiv Amrapurkar as Chakradhari Chaudhary
- Tinnu Anand as Sita's father

== Production ==
The role of Arjun Saxena was first offered to Sanjay Dutt but he refused to play that role, then makers approached Anil Kapoor but he also declined after reading the script of his character, the role of Ajay Saxena was first offered to Chunky Pandey then Akshay Kumar but both actor refused to play that role and Akshay Kumar says in an interview that he left the movie because he thinks that his role has nothing to do in the film, then the makers cast Ajay Devgn to play that role. But the role of Arjun Saxena was still empty, after a lot of declines the makers persuade Amitabh Bachchan but he withdrew himself due to poor Script, then they approached Sunil Shetty but he also left the project due to busy schedule and he was also not interested for this role, then makers approached Mithun Chakraborty and he accepted this role by saying that he is always ready for these types of characters

== Soundtrack ==
The music was composed by Nadeem Shravan with lyrics written by Anand Bakshi. The song Deewana Deewana was lifted from A. R. Rahman's Tamil song Thillana Thillana from the film Muthu (1995).

#	Title	Singer(s)
1	"Deewana Deewana Yeh Dil"	Abhijeet, Kavita Krishnamurthy
2	"Jabse Tumko Dekha Hai"	Kavita Krishnamurthy
3	"Kya Dekh Raha Hai Yaar"	Babul Supriyo, Vinod Rathod, Priya Bhattacharya
4	"Aadhi Raat Ko"	Vinod Rathod, Kavita Krishnamurthy
5	"Ooi Amma Ooi Amma"	Kavita Krishnamurthy
6	"Dil Ne Kaha Dil Ne Suna"	Nadeem Saifi
