= Shubhmangal Online =

2020 Indian Marathi language TV series

- Genre: Romance; Drama
- Written by: Manish Dalvi; Jitendra Gupta; Vaibhav Chinchalkar
- Directed by: Vaibhav Chinchalkar; Nishant Surve; Milind Pednekar
- Starring: See below
- Opening theme: "Shubhmangal Online" by Aniruddha Joshi and Sharayu Date
- Country of origin: India
- Original language: Marathi
- No. of episodes: 298

Production
- Producer: Manjiri Bhave
- Camera setup: Multi-camera
- Running time: 22 minutes
- Production company: Kanha's Magic

Original release
- Network: Colors Marathi
- Release: 28 September 2020 – 18 September 2021

Shubhmangal Online (transl. Online marriage) is an Indian Marathi language television series which aired on Colors Marathi. It starred Sayali Sanjeev and Suyash Tilak in lead roles. It premiered from 28 September 2020 and ended on 18 September 2021. It is produced by Manjiri Bhave under the banner of Kanha's Magic.

== Plot ==
A marriage fixed during lockdown, where Sharvari and Shantanu have never meet personally, a few video calls is the reason of their life bond. Shantanu is shy guy who says that their parents have forced him for marriage whereas Sharvari seems like confident and fun loving girl.

== Cast ==
=== Main ===
- Sayali Sanjeev as Sharvari Gawaskar
- Suyash Tilak as Shantanu Sadavarte

=== Recurring ===
- Sukanya Kulkarni as Anupama Sadavarte
- Samidha Guru as Aishwarya Randive
- Amita Khopkar as Padma
- Smital Haldankar as Vidya Kanvinde
- Archana Nipankar as Rucha Gawaskar
- Rushikesh Wamburkar as Chinmay Kamat
- Guru Divekar as Harshad Gawaskar
- Ankita Panvelkar as Madhuri Gawaskar
- Shraddha Pokhrankar as Minakshi Palekar
- Asmita Khatkhate as Ratna
- Yogesh Kelkar as Jagdish Gawaskar
- Anand Ingale as Harinivas Guruji
- Milind Phatak as Shrikant Sadavarte
- Sachin Deshpande as Advocate Kirti Kumar Agnihotri

== Awards ==
Colors Marathi Awards 2020
Category	Recipient	Role	Ref.
Best Negative Female	Samidha Guru	Aishwarya	
Best Mother	Sukanya Kulkarni	Anupama	
Best Daughter-in-law	Sayali Sanjeev	Sharvari	
