= Dhartiputra =

1993 film by Iqbal Durrani

- Directed by: Iqbal Durrani
- Written by: Iqbal Durrani
- Produced by: Dinesh Patel
- Starring: Mammootty; Rishi Kapoor; Jaya Prada
- Edited by: Prashanth Khedekar, Vinod Nayak
- Music by: Nadeem-Shravan
- Production company: Sonu Film International
- Release date: 1993
- Country: India
- Language: Hindi

Dhartiputra (transl. Son of Earth) is a 1993 Hindi-language action film written and directed by Iqbal Durrani. The film stars Mammootty, Rishi Kapoor and Jaya Prada in lead roles with Sujata Mehta, Farah and Nagma in other key roles. It was produced by Dinesh Patel, who earlier produced Phool Aur Kaante and Divya Shakti, and the music was written by Nadeem-Shravan.

== Plot ==
The movie revolves around the fight between the dashing police officer Kapil Dev Singh and corrupted bureaucrats and politicians.

== Cast ==
- Mammootty as Kapil Dev Singh, Jailor
- Rishi Kapoor as Shiva
- Jaya Prada as Jeeva
- Sujata Mehta as Gulab bai
- Farah as Karma
- Nagma as Lisa
- Danny Denzongpa as Kripal Singh
- Raza Murad as Yashpal Singh (guest appearance)
- Suresh Oberoi as Governor Pratap (guest appearance)
- Shoma Anand as Meena Bai
- Shahbaz Khan as Anwar Khan
- Shehzad Khan as Mahipal
- Mac Mohan as Rafiq , Kripal Singh's Henchman.
- Amrit Pal as Judge Gulshanchandra
- Vikas Anand as Dr Mohan Sharma

== Soundtrack ==
Dhartiputra

Soundtrack album by Nadeem-Shravan
- Released: 1993
- Recorded: 1993
- Venue: Mumbai
- Studio: Sunny Super Sound
- Genre: Feature film soundtrack
- Length: 44:05 minutes
- Language: Hindi
- Label: Venus Records & Tapes
- Producer: Dinesh B. Patel

Nadeem-Shravan chronology
Hum Hain Rahi Pyar Ke (1993)	Dhartiputra (1993)	Aadmi Khilona Hai (1993)

The music of the film was composed Nadeem-Shravan, and the lyrics were penned by Sameer Anjaan. The album includes 7 songs, sung by Kumar Sanu, Alka Yagnik & Alisha Chinoy. The songs "Khamoshi Hai Ek Baja Hai" & "Saare Rangon Se Hai" are very popular till date.

#	Title	Singer(s)
1	"Saare Rango Se Hai"	Kumar Sanu & Alka Yagnik
2	"Khamoshi Hai Ek Baja Hai" (Duet)	Kumar Sanu & Alka Yagnik
3	"Bulbul Bole Angna Mere"	Alka Yagnik
4	"Mera Tohfa Too Kar Le Kabool"	Kumar Sanu & Alka Yagnik
5	"Ye Hai Sanamkhana"	Alka Yagnik
6	"Mausam Rangila Hai"	Kumar Sanu & Alisha Chinoy
7	"Khamoshi Hai Ek Baja Hai" (Female)	Alka Yagnik
