= Ravindra Mankani =

Indian actor

- Born: 21 May 1956 (age 70)

Ravindra Laxman Mankani (Marathi: रवींद्र लक्ष्मण मंकणी; born 21 May 1956) is an Indian actor who is noted for his work in soap operas, plays and films. He first became a civil engineer and then shifted to acting. He is a recipient of a Maharashtra State Film Award for best acting for his work in Limited Manuski.

He has worked directors such as Jayoo Patwardhan & Nachiket Patwardhan, Gajanan Jagirdar, Vijaya Mehta, Mahesh Manjrekar, Rajkumar Santoshi, Shahab Shamsi, Gajendra Ahire and Mohan Gokhale. Some of his noted serial roles are Shrimant Madhavrao Peshwe in Swami, Thakur Harisingh in Trikaal, Siddharth Singhania in Shanti, and Shrirang Deshmukh in Jhale Mokale Akash.

Some of his Marathi TV serials are Swami, Ashwamedha, Soudamini, Zale Mokale Aakash, Athiti, Kamala Pimpalpaan, Avantika, Sonpavale, Pankhanchi Savali and Hindi serials are Terah Panne, Shrikant, Tiger, Trikaal, Shanti, CID: Special Bureau and Khaki. Some of his notable dramas are Aakrosh, Aparsh Amrutacha, Reshim Dhage, Buland, Mahant, Hee Shrinchi Ichha and films are Nagin, Smruti Chitre, Nivdung, Varsa Laxmicha, Limited Manuski, Band Zarokhe, Not only Mrs. Raut and Khandobachya Navane. His awards include 22 June 1897 and Limited Manuski (Marathi – Limited humanity) directed by Nachiket and Jayoo Patwardhan and Varsa Lakshmicha.

== Early life and career ==
Ravindra Mankani was born on 21 May 1956. He studied civil engineering at the College of Engineering, Pune, where he became involved in theatre during his student years. Mankani was in his final year at the college when filmmakers Jayoo and Nachiket Patwardhan noticed him performing on stage and offered him a role in their film 22 June 1897.

Mankani made his screen debut in 22 June 1897 (1979), in which he portrayed Balkrishna Chapekar. The film was directed by Jayoo and Nachiket Patwardhan and was commissioned by the NFDC. Reflecting on the film years later, Mankani recalled that his first shot was a continuous nine-minute-and-57-second take without a retake, and described the experience as one that launched his acting career. After his film debut, Mankani continued to work in Marathi theatre, films and television. His early film work included Smruti Chitre (1982) and Nivdung (1989). He subsequently appeared in films including Varsa Laxmicha (1994), Limited Manuski (1995), Manus (1999), Astitva (2000), Vastupurush (2002), Not Only Mrs. Raut (2003), Shevri (2006), Gho Mala Asla Hava (2009) and Sumbaran (2009).

Mankani also became well known on Marathi television. Among his notable television roles was Madhavrao Peshwa in the series Swami. He subsequently appeared in series including Trikaal, Shanti, Zale Mokale Akash and Baapmanus. He also worked in Hindi television and appeared in series including Shrikant, Trikaal, Shanti and CID: Special Bureau.

Alongside acting, Mankani has been associated with advertising and media production in Pune. The website of Raviraj Publicity identifies him as its CEO and describes his work in advertising, media, acting, directing and production.
