= Kishwer Merchant =

Indian television actress

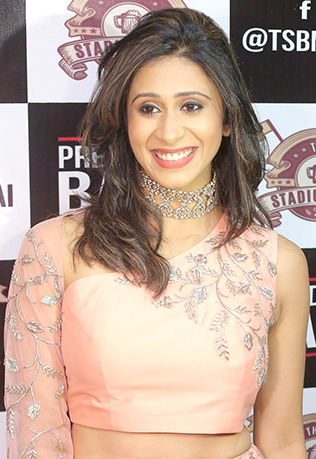
- Merchant in 2017
- Born: 3 February 1981 (age 45); Bombay, Maharashtra, India
- Occupations: Actress; model
- Years active: 1997–2023
- Spouse: Suyyash Rai (m. 2016)
- Children: 1

Kishwer Merchant Rai (née Merchant; born 3 February 1981) is an Indian actress and model who works in Hindi television. Merchant is well known for her work in several television productions such as Hip Hip Hurray, Ek Hasina Thi, Itna Karo Na Mujhe Pyaar, Har Mushkil Ka Hal Akbar Birbal, Pyaar Kii Ye Ek Kahaani and Kaisi Yeh Yaariyan. She also participated as contestant in the reality show Bigg Boss 9 in 2015.

== Life and career ==
=== Early life and debut show (1981–2009) ===
Merchant was born into a Muslim family in Mumbai to Siraj Merchant and Rizwana Merchant. She started her career in 1997 with the TV show Shaktimaan, in which she played Julia, an assistant. She then played Nonie in the popular show Hip Hip Hurray from 1998 to 2000. Kishwar then appeared in many successful popular shows like Babul Ki Duwayen Leti Jaa, Des Mein Niklla Hoga Chand, Kutumb, Kasautii Zindagii Kay, Kayaamat – Jabb Bhi Waqt Aata Hai, Hatim and Khichdi.

Kishwar appeared in many Balaji shows like Kkavyanjali and Kasamh Se. In 2007, she played the positive role of Tamanna in Sanaya Irani and Arjun Bijlani's popular youth show Miley Jab Hum Tum in 2008. She is very popular for playing Haseena in the popular Sukirti Kandpal and Vivian Dsena series Pyaar Kii Ye Ek Kahaani. She also played a role of Sonia in the second season of the hit show – Chhoti Bahu.

=== Breakthrough and success (2012–2015) ===
In 2012, Merchant was seen in three shows Amrit Manthan, Teri Meri Love Stories and Arjun. Then came many shows like Hongey Judaa Na Hum and Parvarrish – Kuchh Khattee Kuchh Meethi. She appeared in the popular shows Ek Hasina Thi as Raima, Madhubala – Ek Ishq Ek Junoon as Ananya, Kaisi Yeh Yaariyan as Nyonika and Itna Karo Na Mujhe Pyaar as Dimpy, sharing the screen with many popular actresses like Drashti Dhami and Sanjeeda Sheikh.

=== Bigg Boss and further success (2015–2023) ===
Merchant was a participant in the reality TV show Bigg Boss 9 along with her boyfriend Suyyash Rai in 2015. She was paired with Aman Verma. Merchant, was forced to quit the Ticket to Finale task in its last leg and walked out of the house involuntarily with Rs 15 lakhs.

In 2016, Kishwar made her comeback with Balaji's popular show Brahmarakshas, playing the main antagonist, Aparajita.

In April 2017, Kishwar was seen in yet another Ekta Kapoor's show, Dhhai Kilo Prem, which airs on Star Plus. She played a cameo appearance as Shilpa. In May 2017, she was seen in Rashmi Sharma's Savitri Devi College & Hospital on Colors, but later she quit the show. Kishwar was also playing Asha in And TV's show Gangaa, which stars Aditi Sharma. The show went off air on 2 June 2017.

== Personal life ==
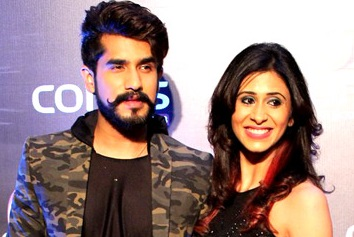
With her husband Suyyash at an event, 2016

In 2010, Kishwer Merchant started dating actor Suyyash Rai. They got married on 16 December 2016. On 2 March 2021 the couple announced that they were expecting their first child.

On 27 August 2021, the couple became parents to a boy and named him 'Nirvair'.

== Filmography ==
=== Films ===
Year	Film	Role	Ref
2011	Bheja Fry 2	Spanta Patel	
2019	Marne Bhi Do Yaaron	Sunny	

=== Television ===
Year	Name	Role	Notes	Ref(s)
1997	Shaktimaan	Julia		
1998–2001	Hip Hip Hurray	Nonie		
1999	X Zone		Episodic role	
1999	Hello Friends		Episodic role	
2000–2001	Babul Ki Duwayen Leti Jaa	Malavika		
2001–2004	Ssshhhh...Koi Hai	Various characters		
2001–2003	Sarhadein	Pranati		
2001–2003	Shikwah	Mehwish		
2001–2002	Des Mein Niklla Hoga Chand	Sonam		
2001–2002	Kutumb	Swati		
2002	Kasautii Zindagii Kay	Mitali Sharma		
2002	Dhadkan	Dr. Aditi		
2002–2003	Kammal	Nisha Jajoo		
2002–2004	Kya Hadsaa Kya Haqeeqat	Nikki Chauhan		
2002–2006	Piya Ka Ghar	Malini		
2003–2005	Kayaamat – Jabb Bhi Waqt Aata Hai	Pooja		
2004	Hatim	Rubina		
2004	Khichdi	Rambha		
2004	Sarabhai vs Sarabhai	Dr. Kiran		
2005–2006	Reth	Dr. Dakshi		
2005	Rihaee	Tanvi		
2005	Instant Khichdi	Rambha		
2005–2006	Kkavyanjali	Vanshita Nanda		
2006	Kasamh Se	Seema Shukla		
2006–2007	Kaajjal	Amisha Veer Pratapsingh		
2006–2009	Kashmakash Zindagi Ki	Mandira		
2007–2008	Meri Awaz Ko Mil Gayi Roshni	Rama Chopra		
2008	Arslaan	Mikawi		
2008–2009	Miley Jab Hum Tum	Tamanna "Tam Mam"		
2009	C.I.D	Pari	Episode "Khooni Khel"	
2010	C.I.D	Roshini	Episode "Kissa Gumnaam Bacche Ka"	
2009–2010	Namak Haraam	Priya Sehgal		
2010–2011	Pyaar Kii Ye Ek Kahaani	Haseena Raichand		
2011	Geet – Hui Sabse Parayi	Guest		
2012	Chhoti Bahu 2 - Sawar Ke Rang Rachi	Sonia Bhardwaj		
2012	Har Yug Mein Aayega Ek – Arjun	Senior Forensic expert		
2012	Teri Meri Love Stories	Meera's friend		
2012	Amrit Manthan	Mrs. Adhiraj SIngh		
2012	Savdhaan India	Sharmila	"Episode 528"	
2012	Savdhaan India	Roshni	Episode "580"	
2012	Fear Files: Darr Ki Sacchi Tasvirein	Malini	Episodic role	
2012–2013	Best Friends Forever?	Mandira Singh		
2013	Hongey Judaa Na Hum	Rama		
2013	Parvarrish – Kuchh Khattee Kuchh Meethi	Parminder		
2013	SuperCops vs Supervillains	Tarot Card Reader		
2013	Crazy Stupid Ishq	Jasmin Atwal		
2013	Yeh Hai Aashiqui	Herself	Guest	
2013–2014	The Adventures of Hatim	Zelna		
2014	Madhubala – Ek Ishq Ek Junoon	Ananya Kapoor		
2014	Ek Hasina Thi	Raima Maheshwari		
2014–2015	Box Cricket League 1	Contestant	Winner	
2014–2015	Akbar Birbal	Urvashi		
2014–2018	Kaisi Yeh Yaariyan	Nyonika Malhotra		
2014–2015	Itna Karo Na Mujhe Pyaar	Dimpy Karan Kapoor		
2015–2016	Bigg Boss 9	Contestant	Walked on Day 89 (7th place)	
2016	Box Cricket League 2	Contestant	Winner	
2016	Box Cricket League Punjab	Contestant	Player in Ambarsariye Hawks	
2016	Desi Explorers	Herself		
2016	Adaalat 2	Devika		
2016	Brahmarakshas – Jaag Utha Shaitaan	Aparajita	Cameo	
2017	BIG Memsaab	Contestant		
2017	Dhhai Kilo Prem	Shilpa	Cameo	
2017	Savitri Devi College & Hospital	Neeta Malhotra		
2017	Gangaa	Asha	Cameo Role	
2017	Chidiya Ghar	Sheela Kejwani	Cameo	
2017–2018	Partners Trouble Ho Gayi Double	Aisha Nadkarni		
2018	Rishta Likhenge Hum Naya	Arpita Singh Rathore		
2018	Box Cricket League 3	Contestant	Player in Delhi Dragons	
2018	Laal Ishq	Daisy	Episodic role	
2019	Box Cricket League 4	Contestant	Player in Kolkata Babu	
2019–2020	Kahaan Hum Kahaan Tum	Dr. Nishi Sippy		
2022	Fanaa: Ishq Mein Marjawan	Meera Raichand		
2026	Family Full House with Rohit Sharma	Guest	Episode 13	

=== Web series ===
Year	Name	Role	Notes	Ref(s)
2023	Dear Ishq	Maya Costa		

== Theatre ==
Kishwar Merchant has also been associated with theatre productions. In 2019, she appeared in the stage plays Patte Khul Gaye and Hello Zindagi, both of which were produced by Rahul Bhuchar under the banner of Felicity Theatre.
