= Alihassan Turabi =

Indian television actor

Alihasan Turabi
- Born: Alihasan Turabi; Indore, Madhya Pradesh, India
- Occupation: Actor
- Years active: 2000–present
- Known for: Kahaani Ghar Ghar Kii; Kayaamat – Jabb Bhi Waqt Aata Hai; Bas Thode Se Anjane; Yeh Rishta Kya Kehlata Hai; "Border 2"; "Amarvishwas"
- Spouse: Sabahat Alihasan (m. 2007)
- Children: 1

Alihasan Turabi better known as Ali Hasan, is an Indian actor best known for playing Aryan in the Star Plus show, Kahaani Ghar Ghar Kii. Apart from this, he has done many roles in various Indian television shows like Raja Ki Aayegi Baraat, Naaginn, Star One Horror Nights, Veer Shivaji, Mahabharat, C.I.D., SuperCops Vs SuperVillains, Savdhaan India, Sinhasan Battisi, Sapne Suhane Ladakpan Ke. He played Akhilesh Goenka in Star Plus's Yeh Rishta Kya Kehlata Hai from November 2016 to December 2022 opposite Shilpa Raizada.

== Filmography ==
=== Films ===
| Year | Film | Role |
|---|---|---|
| 2000 | Gaja Gamini | Bhola |
| 2004 | Krishna Cottage | Kabir |
| 2024 | Forbidden Love | Rajeev Singh |
| 2026 | Border 2 | Lt Col Zaheer Hussain Khan |

=== Television ===
| Year | Serial | Role |
|---|---|---|
| 2003 | Kya Hadsaa Kya Haqeeqat | Kushal; Amar Mehra |
| 2003–2005 | Kahaani Ghar Ghar Kii | Aryan Doshi |
| 2003–2005 | Kayaamat – Jabb Bhi Waqt Aata Hai | Uday Ahuja |
| 2004 | Karma – Koi Aa Rahaa Hai Waqt Badalney | |
| 2005 | C.I.D. Special Bureau – Hand In The Fish: Part 1 to Part 4 | |
| 2005 | Kaisa Ye Pyar Hai | Advocate Manik Bhasin |
| 2006 | C.I.D. Special Bureau – Saazish: Part 1 to Part 4 | Karan |
| 2006 | C.I.D. | Sandeep / Kremen / Karan Kumar |
| 2006 | Akela | Vikram |
| 2007 | Babul Ki Bitiya Chali Doli Saja Ke | Mohit Verma |
| 2008 | Babul Ki Bitiya Chali Doli Saja Ke | Advocate Aditya Gujral |
| 2007–2008 | Naaginn – Waadon Ki Agniparikshaa | Rudra Singh |
| 2008 | Jai Maa Durga | |
| 2008 | Raavan | Mahiravan |
| 2008 | Raja Ki Aayegi Baraat | Bhushan |
| | Mahima Shani Dev Ki | |
| 2009 | Ninja Pandav | |
| 2010 | C.I.D. – Khatra Chemical Bomb Ka | Raman |
| 2010 | Star One Horror Nights | |
| 2010 | Do Hanson Ka Jodaa | Dwarka Thakur |
| 2011 | Chandragupta Maurya | Virajas |
| 2011–2012 | Veer Shivaji | Sultan Muhammad Adil Shah |
| 2013 | Jai Jag Janani Maa Durga | Mahishasur |
| 2013 | C.I.D. – C.I.D. Bureau Mein Khoon | Dragon |
| 2013 | Arjun | Raghu |
| 2013 | Crazy Stupid Ishq | Neelazeem Khan |
| 2013 | C.I.D. – Singh Saab Ki Jung | Kartik |
| 2014 | Mahabharat | Takshak |
| 2014 | Mahabharat | Jaydrath |
| 2014 | The Adventures of Hatim | Khabees |
| 2014 | Encounter | Vijay |
| 2014 | Sinhasan Battisi | Rahu |
| 2014 | Sapne Suhane Ladakpan Ke | Omkar |
| 2014 | Maharakshak Aryan | Haksa |
| 2014–2015 | Anudamini | Manoj |
| 2015 | Aahat – Maa | |
| 2015 | C.I.D. – Jungle Ka Khooni Khel | Survival Reality Game Show Organizer |
| 2015 | SuperCops Vs SuperVillains | Amar |
| 2015–2016 | Draupadi | Duryodhan |
| 2016 | Sasural Simar Ka | Shaitaan |
| 2016 | C.I.D. – Rahasyamayi Box | Pinzola |
| 2016 | Bas Thode Se Anjane | Sankalp |
| 2016 | Savdhaan India | Shreera |
| 2016–2022 | Yeh Rishta Kya Kehlata Hai | Akhilesh "Akhil" Goenka |
| 2019 | Shrimad Bhagwat Mahapuran | Ravan |
| 2019 | Laal Ishq – Shaitaani Ghadiyaal | Ayush |
| 2023 | Punyashlok Ahilyabai | Saubhag Singh Chandravat |
| 2024 | Main Hoon Saath Tere | Brijbhushan Bundela |
| 2024 | Shiv Shakti – Tap Tyaag Tandav | Pururava |

=== Web Series ===
| Year | Show | Role | Platform |
|---|---|---|---|
| 2026 | Dil Dosti Aur Dhokha | Pratap | Shemaroo Me |
| 2026 | Amarvishwas | Jesu Momin | Amazon |
