= Thipkyanchi Rangoli =

2021 Indian Marathi-language TV series

- Genre: Family drama
- Story by: Manaswini Lata Ravindra; Smita Prakashkar
- Directed by: Girish Vasaikar
- Starring: See below
- Composer: Nilesh Moharir
- Country of origin: India
- Original language: Marathi
- No. of episodes: 679

Production
- Producers: Rupali Guha; Kalyan Guha
- Camera setup: Multi-camera
- Running time: 22 minutes
- Production company: Film Farm India

Original release
- Network: Star Pravah
- Release: 4 October 2021 – 18 November 2023

Related
- Khorkuto

Thipkyanchi Rangoli (transl. Dotted Rangoli) is an Indian Marathi language TV series which aired on Star Pravah. It is directed by Girish Vasaikar and produced by Rupali and Kalyan Guha under the banner of Film Farm India. It is an official remake of Bengali TV series Khorkuto. It premiered from 4 October 2021 replacing Sang Tu Aahes Ka?. It stars Dnyanada Ramtirthkar and Chetan Vadnere in lead roles.

== Plot ==
Apoorva "Appu", a sophisticated upper-class girl, crosses paths with Shashank, a scholar who belongs to a middle-class joint family, and everything changes. Apart from a beautiful love story, It narrates the tale of a joint family, its roots and beliefs. After a few meetings with Shashank, Dr. Kaushik, Apoorva's father, decides to marry Apoorva off with Shashank to teach her morals and ethics. Although Apoorva is a little ill-mannered, she is very good at heart and gets deserved love from Shashank's family. She becomes a part of the family and stands by them through all their difficulties.

== Cast ==
=== Main ===
- Dnyanada Ramtirthkar as Apoorva "Appu" Vartak Kanitkar – Kaushik and Anjali's daughter; Netra's cousin; Shashank's wife
- Chetan Vadnere as Shashank "Khadoos" Kanitkar – Vitthal and Suvarna's son; Suman's brother; Amey, Avantika and Prachi's cousin; Apoorva's husband

=== Recurring ===
Shashank's family

- Sharad Ponkshe / Uday Tikekar as Vinayak "Dada" Kanitkar – Patriarchy of Kanitkars'; Vitthal, Vidya and Vikas's brother; Madhavi's husband; Amey and Avantika's father
- Supriya Pathare as Madhavi "Mai" Kanitkar – Vinayak's wife; Amey and Avantika's mother
- Mangesh Kadam as Vitthal "Vithu" Kanitkar – Vinayak, Vidya and Vikas's brother; Suvarna's husband, Shashank and Suman's father
- Leena Bhagwat as Suvarna "Suva" Kanitkar – Vitthal's wife, Shashank and Suman's mother
- Atul Todankar as Vikas "Cookie" Kanitkar – Vinayak, Vitthal and Vidya's brother; Aparna's husband; Prachi's father
- Sheetal Kulkarni as Aparna "Panna" Kanitkar – Vikas's wife; Prachi's mother
- Sarika Nawathe as Vidya "Babi" Kanitkar Vaidya – A Teacher; Vinayak, Vitthal and Vikas's sister; Bhaskar's wife
- Swapnil Kale as Amey Kanitkar – Vinayak and Madhavi's son; Avantika's brother; Shashank, Suman and Prachi's cousin; Manasi's husband
- Amruta Phadke / Sai Kalyankar as Manasi Kanitkar – Amey's wife
- Veena Jagtap as Avantika Kanitkar Chaudhari – Vinayak and Madhavi's daughter; Amey's sister; Shashank, Suman and Prachi's cousin
- Namrata Pradhan as Suman "Sumi" Kanitkar Darekar – Vitthal and Suvarna's daughter; Shashank's sister; Amey, Avantika and Prachi's cousin; Nikhil's wife
- Tanvi Barve as Prachi "Prachu" Kanitkar – Vikas and Aparna's daughter; Amey, Avantika, Shashank and Suman's cousin

Appu's family

- Rajan Tamhane as Kaushik Vartak – A cardiologist, Sarika's brother; Anjali's estranged husband; Apoorva's father
- Mugdha Godbole-Ranade as Anjali Vartak – A cardiologist, Kaushik's estranged wife; Apoorva's estranged mother
- Radhika Vidyasagar as Sarika Vartak Desai – Kaushik's sister; Netra's mother; Apoorva's mother-figure
- Snehlata Maghade / Pranjal Ambavane as Netra Desai – Sarika's daughter; Apoorva's cousin

=== Others ===
- Shrikant Bhide / Guru Divekar as Nikhil Darekar – Suman's husband
- Rasika Dhamankar / unknown as darekar kaku - Nikhil's mother
- Kashyap Parulekar as Bhaskar Vaidya – Vidya's husband
- Maithili Patwardhan as Ovi – Deepali's daughter
- Ashutosh Kulkarni as Abhay – Apoorva's friend
- Shubha Khote as Durga – Vinayak, Vitthal and Vikas's aunt
- Mangesh Desai as Dhananjay Karmarkar
- Shalaka Pawar as Snehlata Paranjape
- Vishakha Subhedar as Damayanti
- Ujjwala Jog as Shakuntala
- Bipin Surve as Krish
- Ashwini Apte as Deepali
- Roshan Vichare as Ronit
- Akshay Waghmare as Ninad
- Ashwin Bornare as Chandu Bhatwadekar

== Production ==
=== Development ===
Rupali Guha and Kalyan Guha, the producer of Film Farm India announces the Marathi remake of Khorkuto a Bengali series aired on Star Jalsha. The title song was composed by Nilesh Moharir and lyrics by Rohini Ninawe and sung by Sai Tembhekar.

=== Casting ===
Dnyanada Ramtirthkar was selected for the role of Apoorva and Chetan Vadnere selected for the role of Shashank. Mugdha Godbole plays the role of Apoorva's mother and Sharad Ponkshe the role of Vinayak Kanitkar.

== Awards ==
Star Pravah Parivaar Awards
Year	Category	Recipient	Role
2022	Best Family		Kanitkar family
2022	Best Face - Female	Dnyanada Ramtirthkar	Apoorva
2023	Best Daughter-in-law	Dnyanada Ramtirthkar	Apoorva
2023	Best Siblings	Sharad Ponkshe, Mangesh Kadam, Atul Todankar, Sarika Nawathe	Vinayak, Vithhal, Vikas, Vidya

== Adaptations ==
Language	Title	Original release	Network(s)	Last aired	Notes
Bengali	Khorkuto খড়কুটো	17 August 2020	Star Jalsha	21 August 2022	Original
Tamil	Namma Veetu Ponnu நம்ம வீட்டு பொண்ணு	16 August 2021	Star Vijay	25 March 2023	Remake
Marathi	Thipkyanchi Rangoli ठिपक्यांची रांगोळी	4 October 2021	Star Pravah	18 November 2023	Remake
Malayalam	Palunku പളുങ്ക്	22 November 2021	Asianet	30 December 2022	Remake
Hindi	Kabhi Kabhie Ittefaq Sey कभी कभी इत्तेफाक से	3 January 2022	StarPlus	20 August 2022	Remake
Kannada	Jenugudu ಜೇನುಗೂಡು	21 February 2022	Star Suvarna	30 September 2023	Remake
Telugu	Pallakilo Pelli Kuthuru పల్లకిలో పెళ్ళి కూతురు	26 September 2022	Star Maa	13 May 2023	Remake
