= Chotya Bayochi Mothi Swapna =

Indian Marathi-language drama TV series

- Genre: Drama
- Starring: See below
- Country of origin: India
- Original language: Marathi
- No. of episodes: 736

Production
- Production locations: Devgad, Maharashtra, India
- Camera setup: Multi-camera
- Running time: 22 minutes

Original release
- Network: Sony Marathi
- Release: 12 September 2022 – 4 January 2025

Chotya Bayochi Mothi Swapna (transl. Big Dreams of a Small Bayo) is an Indian Marathi language television series airing on Sony Marathi. It stars Suhani Naik, Veena Jamkar and Vikram Gaikwad in lead roles. It premiered from 12 September 2022 by replacing Boss Majhi Ladachi.

== Plot ==
Bayo, a 12-year-old intelligent girl from Katal Gav in Devgad (in Sindhudurg), she loves reading and saves money she collects by helping others in a piggy bank. Bayo has just one dream, to become the first doctor in her village, and she will do anything to realise it.

== Cast ==
=== Main ===
- Vijaya Babar as Bayo
  - Ruchi Nerurkar as younger Bayo
- Veena Jamkar as Bharati
- Vikram Gaikwad as Shubhankar

=== Recurring ===
- Rucha Gaikwad as Ira
  - Anushka Pokale as younger Ira
- Swapnali Patil / Bageshree Deshpande as Gautami
- Suruchi Adarkar as Anu Desai
- Yogesh Sohoni as Vishal Patil
- Ojas Marathe as Abhiram
- Sudarshan Khot as Aarav
  - Shaurin Desai as younger Aarav
- Shashank Dharane as Ramakant
- Sayali Jathar as Vaibhavi Patil
- Shantanu Moghe as Dushyant Waghmare
- Suhani Naik as Guddi
- Deepjyoti Naik as Goda
- Leena Patkar / Deepa Malkar as Suman
- Shraddha Satam as aunt
- Nikunj Shivalkar as Shailu
- Kalpana Sarang as Indu
