= Business Batein =

Indian Television Series

Business Batein is a TV programme on Doordarshan produced by the Observer India Ltd and Fiscal Fitness, a finance and business programme by the Pritish Nandy and Anuradha Prasad's production for Zee TV in the year 1992.
