= Suruchi Adarkar =

Indian Marathi actress

- Born: 25 April 1988 (age 38); Thane, Maharashtra, India
- Occupation: Actress
- Years active: 2007–present
- Spouse: Piyush Ranade (m. 2023)

Suruchi Adarkar (born 25 April 1988) is an Indian Marathi actress who has featured in Marathi television serials. She started her career with an ad play Avagha Rang Ekachi Zala. She known for her portrayal in Zee Marathi's Ka Re Durava as Aditi Khanolkar.

== Career ==
Adarkar appeared as Aditi in Ka Re Durava. She also acted a small role in the Hindi film Tathastu, wherein Sanjay Dutt was the hero. Apart from this, she supports women empowerment, an initiative by Zee Marathi Jagruti.

== Personal life ==
In December 2023, She married Marathi actor Piyush Ranade.

== Filmography ==
=== Television ===
Year	Title	Role	Channel	Ref.
2005 2006	Apne mere apne Pehchaan	Kirti Vidya	DD1 Channel	
2007-2008	Avaghachi Sansar	Harsh's receptionist	Zee Marathi	
2010-2011	Olakh	Anusha Inamdar	Star Pravah	
2011	Ek Taas Bhutacha	Episodic role	Mi Marathi	
2012	Unch Majha Zoka	Muktabai Sathe	Zee Marathi	
2013	Aapla Buva Asa Aahe	Resident member	ETV Marathi	
2014	Swapnanchya Palikadle	Veena	Star pravah	
2014-2016	Ka Re Durava	Aditi Khanolkar	Zee Marathi	
2017-2018	Anjali - Jhep Swapnanchi	Dr. Anjali	Zee Yuva	
2019	Ek Ghar Mantarlela	Gargee	Zee Yuva	
2020-2021	Chala Hawa Yeu Dya - Ladies Jindabad	Contestant	Zee Marathi	
2022–2023	Woh Toh Hai Albelaa	Kusum Chaudhary / Kusum Yash Jindal	Star Bharat	
2023	Chotya Bayochi Mothi Swapna	Anu Desai	Sony Marathi	
2024	Satvya Mulichi Satavi Mulgi	Astika Jathar	Zee Marathi	

=== Films ===
- Tathastu (2006)
- Maat (2013)
- Narbachi Wadi
- Ata Batli Futli
- Gaath
- Baipan Bhaari Deva

=== Play ===
- Avagha Rang Ek Zala
