= Kavita Chaudhary =

Indian actress (1957–2024)

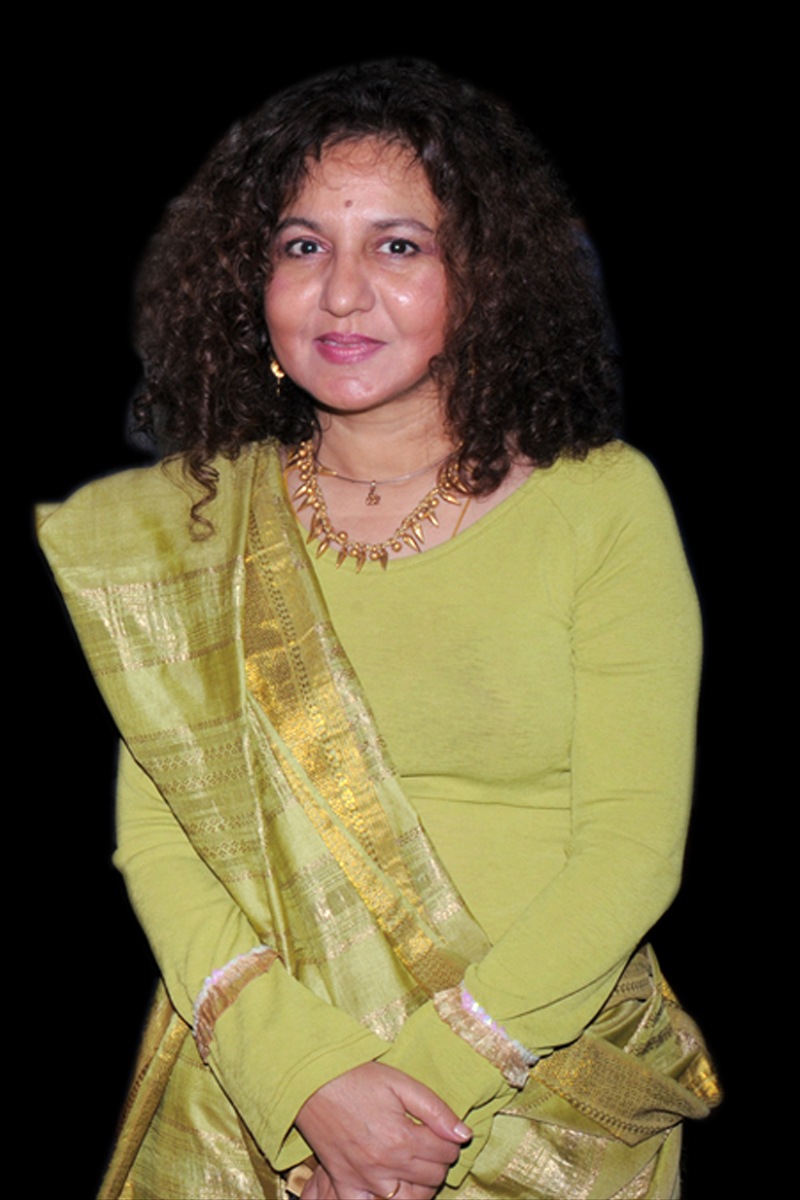
- Chaudhry in 2011
- Born: 1956/1957
- Died: 15 February 2024 (aged 67); Amritsar, Punjab, India
- Occupations: Actress, television director, producer, writer
- Years active: 1981–2024
- Relatives: Kanchan Chaudhary Bhattacharya (sister)

Kavita Chaudhary (1956/1957 – 15 February 2024) was an Indian television actress, director, producer and writer, well known for her portrayal of IPS officer Kalyani Singh in the Doordarshan series Udaan. She was the younger sister of police officer Kanchan Chaudhary Bhattacharya.

Kavita also made two more television shows – Your Honour and IPS Diaries.

Chaudhary was also the famous face of HUL's Surf detergent commercials in India, playing the character of housewife Lalita ji in the advertisement in the late 1980s.

Kavita Chaudhary died from a heart attack at a hospital in Amritsar, on 15 February 2024, at the age of 67.

== Filmography ==
=== Television ===
Year	Serial	Role	Channel	Notes
1981–1982	Apradhi Kaun!			
1989–1991	Udaan	IPS Officer Kalyani Singh	DD National	
2000	Your Honour		DD National	
2015	IPS Diaries	Anchor	DD National	
