= Ka Re Durava =

Indian Marathi language soap opera

- Genre: Romance; Soap opera
- Written by: Kiran Kulkarni; Pallavi Karkera
- Directed by: Jalindar Kumbhar
- Starring: See below
- Country of origin: India
- Original language: Marathi
- No. of episodes: 508

Production
- Producers: Kalyani Guha; Rupali Guha; Harsha Dave
- Camera setup: Multi-camera
- Running time: 22 minutes
- Production company: Film Farm India

Original release
- Network: Zee Marathi
- Release: 18 August 2014 – 27 March 2016

Ka Re Durava (transl. Why the distance?) is an Indian Marathi language TV series which aired on Zee Marathi. It starred Suruchi Adarkar and Suyash Tilak in lead roles. It premiered from 18 August 2014 by replacing Eka Lagnachi Tisri Goshta.

== Synopsis ==
Ka Re Durava is the story of a young married couple, Jay (Suyash Tilak) and Aditi (Suruchi Adarkar) who live in Mumbai and carry big dreams. Jay Khanolkar comes from a middle-class family and is married to Aditi, who is the daughter of a highly influential and wealthy businessman, Anil Dabholkar (Rajan Bhise). Anil Dabholkar has disowned Aditi as he believes she has brought him shame by marrying below their status. Due to financial hardships, Jay and Aditi decide to take up a job. Coincidentally, both end up getting an offer from Dev Tours and Travels, owned by the ambitious Avinash Dev (Subodh Bhave). However, as per the company's policy, married people are not allowed to work in the company. Succumbing to their financial needs and hardships, both decide to take up the job, for which they have to hide their marital status from their colleagues. However,things take a turn when Jay's colleagues, Rajni (Neha Joshi) and Jui (Archana Nipankar) take an interest in him. Elsewhere Aditi is also pursued by her colleagues and in later episodes, Avinash himself. The story progresses as they struggle to keep their relationship hidden, while also trying to mend the broken relations in their life.

== Plot ==
Jairam "Jay" Khanolkar is a young man from an impoverished background who desires to start his own business. He is married to his college friend Aditi Dabholkar, the only child of the wealthy Anil Dabholkar. Jay and Aditi struggle to make ends meet. Anil blames Jay for causing hardship to his daughter; however, he refuses to acknowledge that Aditi married Jay of her own free will. Desperate for money, Aditi joins Dev Tours, run by Avinash Dev, despite its policy of not recruiting married employees. Few days later, due to an unfortunate circumstance, one of Jay's business deals goes awry. Jay is compelled to accept a loan of ₹5 lakh from Avinash and join his company. Due to dire financial straits, Jay and Aditi reluctantly conceal their married status and pretend to be ordinary colleagues.

Thus the couple spend their days weaving a web of lies to overcome situations. Jay and Aditi take up residence in Bandra and become close to their landlord, Dinanath Ketkar, and his wife. On one hand, due to the poor decisions of Jay's elder brother, the responsibility of the Khanolkar family gradually falls entirely on Jay's shoulders. On the other hand, a love triangle ensues in the office with Rajni and Jui falling for Jay. Avinash develops feelings for Aditi and is jealous of her closeness with Jay. During his work, Jay crosses paths with his father-in-law. Although Anil is livid upon learning the entire situation, he doesn't expose Jay, and instead, exploits it to harass him by demanding unreasonable standards at work. Jay tolerates this initially, but gradually, he becomes infuriated with Anil's behaviour. He deftly manipulates situations and becomes so successful at work that Anil can do nothing about it. Worse, Anil is eventually forced to share his cabin with Jay. However, Anil comes up with another ploy and deceives Aditi by pretending to have accepted Jay as his son-in-law. Jay does not disclose the ruse for Aditi's happiness.

Eventually, Anil discovers that Avinash's mother wishes Aditi to be her daughter-in-law. He proposes a collaboration with Avinash on a grand project, and Jay is appointed as its leader. Anil also creates opportunities for Avinash and Aditi to be together and uses that to torment Jay. On the other hand, irritated by Rajni's antagonism towards Aditi, Jay emphatically rejects her. Few days later, Jay learns of Avinash's decision to make him a business partner along with Anil Dabholkar. Later, Anil threatens Jay that if Aditi leaves Dev Tours, he will withdraw his entire investment from Avinash's dream project and pin the blame on Jay. Aditi is horrified when Avinash unexpectedly proposes to her. Later, in a desperate bid to persuade Aditi to accept Avinash's proposal, Anil reveals his threat to Jay, which upsets Aditi. Eventually the couple reveal their marital status to everyone and are forgiven because of their immense contribution. The story ends with Anil accepting Jay and Aditi's marriage.

== Cast ==
=== Main ===
- Suyash Tilak as Jairam Parshuram Khanolkar (Jay)
- Suruchi Adarkar as Aditi Jairam Khanolkar / Aditi Anil Dabholkar

=== Recurring ===
- Arun Nalawade as Dinanath Ketkar
- Manasi Magikar as Mrs. Ketkar
- Rajan Bhise as Anil Dabholkar, Aditi's father
- Prajakta Dighe as Anita Anil Dabholkar, Aditi's mother
- Prafulla Samant as Parshuram Khanolkar (Anna), Jay's father
- Vandana Marathe as Jay's mother
- Sheetal Kshirsagar as Shobha Abhiram Khanolkar, Jay's sister-in-law
- Mahesh Joshi as Abhiram Parshuram Khanolkar, Jay's brother
- Sheetal Shukla as Shobha's mother
- Ila Bhate as Avinash's mother (Aau)
- Rajshri Nikam as Shakuntala
- Amit Khedekar as Suhas

Office staff

- Subodh Bhave as Avinash Deo
- Neha Joshi as Rajani
- Neha Shitole as Naina
- Vishakha Subhedar as Nandini
- Aashish Pathode as Amit
- Sunil Tawde as Arvind Kadam
- Archana Nipankar as Jui Gadgil
- Omprakash Shinde as Saiprasad
- Sunil Godbole as Mr. Navare
- Umesh Jagtap as Mr. Tangade
- Shalaka Pawar as Tilottama
- Kalpana Sarang as Devyani

== Awards ==
Zee Marathi Utsav Natyancha Awards 2015
Category	Recipient	Role
Best Series		
Best Couple	Suyash Tilak-Suruchi Adarkar	Jay-Aditi
Best Character Male	Arun Nalawade	Ketkar Kaka
Best Father	Arun Nalawade	Ketkar Kaka
Best Mother	Manasi Magikar	Ketkar Kaku
Best Father-in-law	Prafulla Samant	Anna
Best Supporting Female	Ila Bhate	Aau
Best Supporting Male	Sunil Tawde	Arvind Kadam

=== Special episode (1 hour) ===
1. 12 October 2014
2. 19 July 2015
3. 27 September 2015
4. 27 March 2016
