= Shrikant (TV series) =

- Based on: Srikanta by Sarat Chandra Chattopadhyay
- Directed by: Praveen Nischol
- Starring: Farooque Shaikh Rita Bhaduri Sujata Mehta Mrinal Kulkarni Irrfan Khan Ravindra Mankani Satish Pulekar Asha Sharma
- Original language: Hindi

Production
- Running time: 25 minutes

Original release
- Network: DD National
- Release: 1987

Shrikant is a TV show based on Sarat Chandra Chattopadhyaya's 1917-1933 four volume novel Srikanta. The show aired on Doordarshan in 1987.

The show was again telecast on DD National from 30 April 2020 during the lockdown due to coronavirus

== Synopsis ==
The show tells the story of protagonist Shrikant (Farooque Shaikh). Sujata Mehta plays Raj Lakshmi. She nurses him to health when he is infected by plague. Later during a sea voyage to Burma, he meets Abhaya (Mrinal Kulkarni), a woman abandoned by her husband (Irrfan Khan). In Burma, he receives the devotion of a lodge caretaker played by Sukanya Kulkarni. His love ideal remains Rajlakshmi.

== Cast ==
- Farooque Shaikh as Shrikant
- Mrinal Kulkarni as Abhaya
- Ravindra Mankani as Rohini
- Irrfan Khan as Abhaya's husband.; Rudra Sen Gupta
- Sujata Mehta as Raj Lakshmi
- Ashvini Bhave as Jamuna
- Sukanya Kulkarni
- Tiku Talsania as Dada Thakur
- Asha Sharma
- Urvashi Dholakia as younger Raj Lakshmi
