= Terah Panne =

Indian Television Series (1985)

- Directed by: Vikas Desai
- Theme music composer: Sunil Kaushik

Production
- Producers: Vikas Desai and Kiran Shantaram
- Running time: 30 Minutes

Original release
- Network: Doordarshan

Terah Panne is an Indian TV series directed by Vikas Desai in 1985. It was produced by Vikas Desai and Kiran Shantaram. The main cast of the program are Hema Malini and Tarun Dhanrajgir. Hema Malini played the role of queen "Padmavati".

== Cast ==
- Hema Malini
- Tarun Dhanrajgir
- Ravindra Mankani
