= DD National Kidz Island =

Indian Television Series

- Also known as: Kidz Island : Nanha Dweep
- Presented by: Richa Tiwari
- Country of origin: India
- Original language: Hindi
- No. of seasons: 1

Production
- Production locations: Delhi, India
- Running time: 30 minutes

Original release
- Network: DD National

Kidz Island (or Kids Island) is an Indian educational program for kids which airs on DD National in India, featuring Indian actress Richa Tiwari and former child actor Karan Bhyana on a regular basis to host the show.

== Overview ==
The main theme of the show is to educate kids with fun on their island. In the show, Richa talks about issues like dental care, ayurveda, etc. with special guests. Different quizzes are played with kids invited onto the show.

Some Clips of the show:

- https://www.youtube.com/watch?v=irp409bgoLA (2010)
- https://www.youtube.com/watch?v=0WEwNZ1Cbwc (2012)
- https://www.youtube.com/watch?v=Qg0JQWv-Dro (2011)
