= Kaanch Ke Rishte =

Indian television drama series

- Genre: Drama
- Created by: Salvia International Productions
- Directed by: Arshad Khan
- Starring: see below
- Country of origin: India
- Original language: Hindi
- No. of seasons: 1

Production
- Producers: Tarun Burman; Lalit Arora
- Camera setup: Multi-camera
- Running time: 30 minutes

Original release
- Network: DD National
- Release: 29 March 2009 – present

Kaanch Ke Rishte is a television drama series that aired on DD National. It is based on the story of a retired journalist and his wife. The series premiered on 29 March 2009. It was directed by Arshad Khan, and written by Nawaab Arzoo. The supervising producer and creative director of this show was Tariq Mohammad (Tariq Mohd.).

== Plot ==
The story follows a retired newspaper editor and his wife, who reside alone in a large mansion by the sea, distanced from their sons and extended family. When builders express interest in purchasing the property, they approach the couple's sons with an offer of a substantial sum of money, contingent on convincing their parents to vacate the mansion. The sons initially conspire to persuade their parents to leave and sell the property, but eventually come to regret their actions upon recognizing the emotional harm inflicted on their parents.

== Cast ==
- Rajiv Verma
- Rupa Devatia
- Surendra Pal
- Anant Jog
- Neeraj Bhardwaj
- Feroj Khan
- Raj Gopal
- Digvijay Purohit
- Shravani Goswami
- Asha Vyas
