= Fiscal Fitness =

Business show

Fiscal Fitness was The Pritish Nandy Business Show, India's first weekly business show, on Zee TV telecasted in the year 1991.
