= Kayaamat =

Indian drama television series

- Promotional image
- Also known as: Kayaamat
- Created by: Balaji Telefilms
- Starring: Kishwer Merchant see below
- Opening theme: "Kayaamat" by Sapna Mukherjee
- Country of origin: India
- Original language: Hindi
- No. of episodes: 156

Production
- Producers: Ekta Kapoor; Shobha Kapoor
- Running time: approx. 25 minutes

Original release
- Network: DD National
- Release: 26 September 2003 – 19 March 2005

Kayaamat – Jabb Bhi Waqt Aata Hai is a Hindi-language thriller television series that aired on DD National. It used to run on Fridays and Saturdays at 9 P.M. from 26 September 2003 to 19 March 2005. Kayamath is one of the most popular line up of Doordarshan National Network in 2003 . Kayamath become the highest rated drama series in the channel in a short time .

== Plot ==
Kayaamat revolves around the love and revenge of the Ahuja family. The story takes off when the celebrations in the Ahuja family are in full swing, with the engagement of Naren and Naina’s son Uday (Alihassan Turabi) with Pooja (Kishwer Merchant). Pooja loves Uday to the point of obsession; she wants to own him completely. Her insecurities about Uday get aggravated and go completely out of control with the presence of Anamika (Amita Chandekar), the CEO of a company that does huge business with the Ahuja's. Pooja, at her engagement, sees subtle chemistry developing between Uday and Anamika. Pooja now goes on a rampage as she wants to wreck Anamika. Her love life with Uday can meet its happy end; however, Pooja realizes that Anamika is not easy to defeat. In due course of time, Anamika becomes a favourite of Pooja's family and the Ahuja's. At this point, Pooja decides to go for the final kill. But the question remains that who is Anamika? Is she what she portrays to be, or does she have her own story and reasons for coming to the Ahuja family? Is she as innocent as she portrays, or is this all a plan to achieve her goal and objective? What follows is an ensuing battle to safeguard the honour and prestige of the Ahuja family.

== Cast ==
- Amita Chandekar as Anamika Uday Ahuja
- Alihassan Turabi as Uday Ahuja
- Kishwer Merchant as Pooja Devan Ahuja
- Aashish Kaul as Devan Ahuja
- Anand Suryavanshi as Rohan
- Anand Goradia as Yashwant "Babu"
- Dimple Hirji as Diya Devan Ahuja (Dead)
- Faizan Kidwai as Sanju Ahuja
- Neelam Mehra as Naina Naren Ahuja
- Tushar Joshi as Naren Ahuja
- Shilpa Mehta as Himani Ahuja
- Mithilesh Chaturvedi as Preet
- Chandni Bhagwanani as Child Anisha Ahuja
- Ishaan Bhatia as Child Anish Ahuja
- Sanjay Gandhi as Advocate Prashant
- Shravani Goswami as Ranjana
- Balwant Bansal as Mr. Ahuja
- Lily Patel as Gayatri Ahuja
- Varun Khandelwal as Samar
- Malavika Shivpuri as Ananya Uday Ahuja (Dead)
- Vishal Saini as Raja
- Jarnail Singh as Balbir
- Anil Nagrath as Anamika and Ananya's father
- Nikhil Khera as Dev (son in law of Ahuja family)
- Geetanjali Roy as Netra
- Firoz Ali as Samrat
