= Your Honour (Indian TV series) =

- Created by: Kavita Chaudhary
- Starring: See below
- Original language: Hindi

Original release
- Network: DD National
- Release: 2000 – 2001

Your Honour is an Indian television series that aired on DD National in 2000. The series created by Kavita Chaudhary and was about aspiring lawyers, Kaushalya (Kavita Chaudhary) and Vikas (Aliraza Namdar), as well as police inspector Sooraj (Sachin Khedekar).

== Cast ==
- Kavita Chaudhary as Kaushalya
- Sachin Khedekar as Sooraj
- Aliraza Namdar as Vikas
- Govind Namdev as Adv Kashinath
- Manoj Joshi as Insp Laxman Pawar
- Ashok Lokhande as Shinde
