= Udaan (1989 TV series) =

- Genre: Drama
- Written by: Kavita Chaudhary
- Directed by: Kavita Chaudhary
- Starring: Kavita Chaudhary, Vikram Gokhale, Shekhar Kapur
- Country of origin: India
- Original language: Hindi
- No. of seasons: 1
- No. of episodes: 30

Production
- Editor: Sunil Salgia
- Running time: 25 minutes

Original release
- Network: DD National
- Release: 1989 – 1991

Udaan (meaning Flight) is an Indian television series that aired on Doordarshan from 1989 to 1991 The serial was written and directed by Kavita Chaudhary who was also the main lead of the serial

The show was based on the struggle of a woman aspiring to be an IPS officer. The serial is inspired by true story of IPS Kanchan Choudhary Bhattacharya (Former Director General of Police) Incidentally, Kavita Chaudhary is Kanchan Chaudhary's younger sister in real life.

== Plot ==
It was a story of a girl named Kalyani Singh who joined the police force and with her hard work and sheer determination. Kalyani's father played by Vikram Gokhale loses all his land after it is forcibly taken away from him. Also Kalyani feels neglected when all attention is showered on a boy born in their family who is considered to be the male heir of the family. Kalyani's father tells her she is no less than anybody and should make it her mission to take the flight (Udaan) to a respectable position in the society. She vows to become a police officer and bring back respect to her family.

The story shows how she battles gender discrimination and various problems before successfully becoming a Police Officer. Shekhar Kapur plays the love interest of Kalyani in the serial. It brings out through Kalyani Singh's advice to her officers and constables a way to talk politely and in a helpful manner to every law-abiding citizen since they are public servants.

Kalyani Singh's ideals are so high that even as an IAS (Indian Administrative Service) officer played by Shekhar Kapur is trying to impress and marry her, she carefully evaluates his ideals to see if they are compatible with her own, before making a decision. The episode where a citizen is amazed that his request is approved by the IAS officer DM (district magistrate, an IAS officer, played by Shekhar Kapur) in such short time that the citizen questions if the request has indeed been approved already, and when the district magistrate assures him that it has, touches his feet with gratitude is very touching. In the same episode, when the PA (personal assistant) to the DM tries to present various bureaucratic hurdles to prevent quick approval of the citizen's case, the director is sending a subtle message when she has the DM respond, "rules are made to make us work in an orderly manner, but should not be used to put hurdles to make the public frustrated".

The serial ends with the director showing us that when the public have the strength to stand up against injustice in society, then justice can prevail and the public themselves can benefit from such initiatives. The last scene shows Kalyani Singh and her family driving off towards her place of posting after attending a public meeting, while a voice in the background explains and justifies the "udaan" that Kalyani Singh IPS has been through.

== Cast ==
- Kavita Chaudhary as Kalyani Singh
- Shekhar Kapur as Harish Menon
- Uttara Baokar as Janki
- Anil Rastogi
- Vikram Gokhale as Brij Mohan
- Ranvijay Thakur
- Kanchan Choudhary Bhattacharya
- Akhilendra Mishra as Hardayal Singh
- Satish Kaushik
