= Chatrapati Sivaji (film) =

1974 film directed by S. A. Kannan

- Genre: Historical drama
- Screenplay by: Thanjaivannan
- Story by: Sivaji Ganesan
- Directed by: S. A. Kannan
- Starring: Sivaji Ganesan
- Country of origin: India
- Original language: Tamil

Production
- Producer: T. S. Narayana Swamy
- Running time: 30 minutes

Original release
- Network: Doordarshan
- Release: 21 July 1974

Chatrapati Sivaji (transl. Sivaji, the protector of people) is a 1974 Indian Tamil-language historical drama television film directed by S. A. Kannan and written by Thanjaivannan. Based on the life of the Maratha warrior Shivaji, it stars Sivaji Ganesan in the title role. The film premiered on Doordarshan on 21 July 1974.

== Production ==
July 1974 was when the tri-centenary of the Maratha warrior Shivaji's ascent to the throne was celebrated. To commemorate this, the Bombay branch of Doordarshan wanted to make a television film later titled Chatrapati Sivaji. T. S. Narayana Swamy, a Doordarshan producer, approached Sivaji Ganesan, who had previously portrayed Shivaji in the play Sivaji Kanda Hindu Rajyam and the film Bhakta Tukaram (1973). Ganesan accepted to play Shivaji, and even offered to finance the whole project. A. V. Meiyappan of AVM Productions lent his studio along with the necessary props for shooting. Thanjaivannan wrote the screenplay based on Ganesan's story. Ganesan's colleague S. A. Kannan was the director, and various technicians from Sivaji Films worked on the project.

== Broadcast ==
Chatrapati Sivaji premiered on Doordarshan on 21 July 1974, before airing on other television channels. Babasaheb Purandare gave an introductory speech in Marathi, after which the film was telecast in Tamil. In 1975, it became the first programme to be telecast on the Madras branch of Doordarshan. As of 2017, the film is preserved in their archives.

== Bibliography ==
- Ganesan, Sivaji; Narayana Swamy, T. S. (2007) [2002]. Autobiography of an Actor: Sivaji Ganesan, October 1928 – July 2001. Sivaji Prabhu Charities Trust. OCLC 297212002.
