= Bas Thode Se Anjane =

Indian Television Series

- Genre: Drama
- Written by: Dhananjay Singh Masoom
- Directed by: Bharat Bhatia
- Starring: Alihassan Turabi; Suhasi Goradia Dhami; Aniruddh Dave; Neetu Singh; Shyam Mashalkar; Natasha Sinha
- Country of origin: India
- No. of seasons: 1

Production
- Producer: Raujesh Kumar Jain
- Running time: 22 minutes

Original release
- Network: DD National
- Release: 12 July – 24 October 2016

Bas Thode Se Anjane is a Hindi drama that premiered on DD National on 12 July 2016. The show is produced by Raujesh Kumar Jain under the banner of Krish Movies and stars Alihassan Turabi, Suhasi Goradia Dhami, Aniruddh Dave, Natasha Sinha, and Shyam Mashalkar.

== Cast ==
- Alihassan Turabi as Sankalp
- Suhasi Goradia Dhami as Sambhavi Agarwal
- Aniruddh Dave as Manav
- Natasha Sinha as Prabha Abhi Awasthi
- Neetu Singh as Shyamli Awasthi
- Vandana Singh as Rozy
- Deepali Sahay as Timli Awasthi
- Tripti Singh as Vimli Awasthi
- Shyam Mashalkar as Bhushan Agarwal
- Sagar Saini as Abhi Awasthi
- Rishikesh Ingley as Harry
- Sagarika Neha as Vibha Awasthi
- Unknown as Advocate Malini Abhi Awasthi
- Unknown as Nisha Awasthi
- Unknown as Netritwa
- Unknown as Martha
