= Kisi Ki Nazarr Na Lage =

- Genre: Drama
- Created by: JR Entertainers Limited
- Written by: Amitabh Singh
- Starring: see below
- Opening theme: "Kisi Ki Nazarr Na Lage"
- Country of origin: India
- Original language: Hindi
- No. of seasons: 1

Production
- Producer: Raja Mukherjee
- Camera setup: Multi-camera
- Running time: 30 minutes

Original release
- Network: DD National
- Release: 7 May 2008 – 3 July 2009

Kisi Ki Nazarr Na Lage is a Hindi language Indian drama television series that airs on DD National channel. The series is produced by Raja Mukherjee, brother of the Bollywood actress Rani Mukherjee. The story is of a joint Bengali family and spans three generations of characters. The series airs every Monday – Friday at 1pm IST.
