= IPS Diaries =

- Genre: Crime
- Starring: Kavita Chaudhary
- Original language: Hindi

Original release
- Network: DD National
- Release: 19 October 2015

IPS Diaries is a crime based show airing on Doordarshan since October 2015. It is anchored by actress Kavita Chaudhary, shown as a retired cop in the series. It features true crime stories, which are televised for the audience.
