= Sujata Mehta =

Indian actress of Gujarati origin

Sujata Mehta (born 11 March 1959) is an Indian actress of Gujarati origin who has acted in plays and Hindi films, mostly known for her lead role in Pratighaat (1987) and supporting roles in Yateem (1988) and Gunaah (1993). She also played the lead role in the critically acclaimed and National Award-winning Malayalam movie Purushartham (1987).

== Early career ==
Sujata was born on 11 March 1959 in Navsari in Shrimali family to Rekha and Prahlad Rai, an Indian independence activist. She is a graduate in Psychology.

== Theatre career ==
Her uncle Hasu Mehta and aunt Devyani Mehta were theatre actors in Bombay (now Mumbai). Under their influence, she was attracted to the theatre. She started her career as a child actor at the age of 13 as a lead actress in a role of blind girl in English play Wait Until Dark. She acted in children's play and Hindi video film Siyahi produced by INT.

She learned from her experience and became a leading actress despite not having any formal training in the theatre. She played a young lady with cancer in Kanti Madia's play Ame Barafna Pankhi. She had a leading role in Paralysis opposite Upendra Trivedi. She acted in several TV plays broadcast by Doordarshan. She also acted in Pravin Joshi's Thank You Mister Glad. Her acclaimed performance as a woman suffering from mental illness in the Gujarati play Chitkar had over 600 shows across the world.

== Film career ==
Her first big break came with N. Chandra's social film Pratighaat (1987) with Nana Patekar where she played a college teacher who is humiliated in public by gangsters. The role was originally played by Vijayashanti in the Telugu film Pratighatna (1986). Sujata was appreciated for her stellar performance in the film.

In Yateem (1988), directed by J. P. Dutta, she played the role of step-mother who tries to seduce her step-son (Sunny Deol). Her performance won her accolades and critical acclaim and a Filmfare Best Supporting Actress nomination. She played the role of a lawyer in Kanwarlal (1988) and was seen in a prominent role in Mahesh Bhatt’s Gunaah opposite Sunny Deol. She did not confine herself to a certain image and played a wide variety of roles in movies like Gunahon Ka Devta (1990), Gunehgar Kaun (1991), Pratigyabadh (1991), Tyaagi (1992), Aaj ki Aurat (1993), Dhartiputra (1993), Hulchul (1995), Judge Mujrim (1997), Meri Mohabbat Mera Nasiba (1995) and Jung (1996).

== TV career ==
Mehta played the role of a proud daughter-in-law in the dynastic drama Khandaan (1985) and the emotional role of Raj Lakshmi in Shrikant (1987); both broadcast on Doordarshan. She play a college girl in Yes Sir (1987). She played Draupadi in Shyam Benegal's Bharat Ek Khoj (1988). She has also acted Andaz (1995) and played Gunsundari in Saraswatichandra (2013). She was a part of several Indian TV soap operas, playing the roles of a mother in Ye Meri Life Hai (2004) and Kyaa Hoga Nimmo Kaa (2006). She had also modeled in many commercials.

== Filmography ==
=== Film ===
Year	Title	Language	Role	Note
1987	Pratighaat	Hindi	Laxmi Joshi	
1987	Rajlakshmi	Hindi	Rajlakshmi	
1988	Yateem	Hindi	Chanchal Yadav	
1988	Kanwarlal	Hindi	Advocate Sandhya	
1990	Gunahon Ka Devta	Hindi	Inspector Shilpa Verma	
1991	Gunehgar Kaun	Hindi	Madhu Saxena	
1991	Pratigyabadh	Hindi	Phoolrani	
1992	Tyagi	Hindi	Sujata Dayal	
1992	Rishta To Ho Aisa	Hindi	Sharda	
1993	Sadhna	Hindi		
1993	Anmol	Hindi		
1993	Aaj Kie Aurat	Hindi	Sunita Menon	
1993	Gunaah	Hindi	Rita	
1993	Dhartiputra	Hindi	Gulab bai	
1993	Krishan Avtaar	Hindi	Suman	
1994	Udhaar Ki Zindagi	Hindi	Gauri	
1994	Maha Shaktishaali	Hindi		
1995	Hum Sab Chor Hain	Hindi	Rashmi	
1995	Hulchul	Hindi	Lekha	
1995	Meri Mohabbat Mera Naseeba	Hindi		
1996	Jung	Hindi	Sita	
1997	Judge Mujrim	Hindi	Sujata Sinha	
2000	Aaj Ka Nanha Farishta	Hindi		
2018	Dhaad	Gujarati, Hindi		
2018	Chitkar	Gujarati		
2019	Dhara 370	Hindi		

=== Television ===
Year	Serial	Role	Channel
1985	Khandaan		DD National
1987	Shrikant	Raj Lakshmi	DD National
1988	Yes Sir		DD National
1988	Bharat Ek Khoj	Draupadi	DD National
1995	Andaz		
2004	Ye Meri Life Hai	Ronit's mother	Sony TV
2006	Kyaa Hoga Nimmo Kaa		STAR One
2013	Saraswatichandra	Gunsundari	
