= Aur Bhi Gham Hain Zamane Mein =

Indian Television Series

- Original language: Hindi
- No. of seasons: 1
- No. of episodes: 32

Original release
- Network: DD National

Aur Bhi Gham Hain Zamane Mein was an Indian television serial broadcast fortnightly on Doordarshan in the early 1980s. It spanned 32 episodes and combined entertainment with education, as each episode highlighted a social problem. The name of the serial was an allusion to Faiz Ahmed Faiz's famous Urdu poem with a slightly different title, "Aur Bhi Dukh Hain Zamane Mein," in which a man explains to his beloved that he is distracted from being focused on her completely by the social injustice and pain he sees around him.
