= Chapekar Brothers (film) =

- Theatrical release poster
- Directed by: Devender Kumar Pandey
- Screenplay by: Dhiraj Mishra
- Produced by: Ghanshyam Patel
- Starring: Abhijit Bhagat; Sanjeet Dhuri; Manoj Bhatt; Govind Namdeo; Megha Joshi; kanchan Awasthi; Raj Sharnagat; Mayank Pandey; Akhilesh jain; Kumkum Das
- Cinematography: Eugene D'souza
- Edited by: Dharmesh Patel
- Music by: Dushyant Dubey
- Production company: Giriva Productions
- Release date: 23 September 2016
- Country: India
- Language: Hindi

Chapekar Brothers is a Hindi-language film directed by Devendar Kumar Pandey. The film features Abhijit Bhagat, Sanjeet Dhuri and Manoj Bhatt as the Chapekar brothers, Indian revolutionaries involved in the 1896 assassination of the British Plague Commissioner of Pune, W C Rand. The film is produced by Ghanshyam Patel of Giriva Productions. The screenplay and dialogue was written by Dhiraj Mishra. Vikas Dixit is the line producer of the movie.

== Cast ==
- Abhijeet Bhagat as Damodar Chapekar
- Sanjeet Dhuri as Balkrishna Chapekar
- Manoj Bhatt as Vashudev Chapekar
- Govind Namdeo as Bal Gangadhar Tilak
- Akhilesh Jain as Haripant Chapekar
- Raj Sharnagat as Sathe
- Megha Joshi as Damodar Chapekar's wife
- Kanchan Awasthi as Balkrishna Chapekar's wife
- Kumkum Das as Laxmibai
- Hemant Jha as Walter Charles Rand

== Production ==
Principal photography of the movie was in progress in Baroda. Film completed in July 2016 and slated to release on 23 September 2016.

== Controversy ==
Chapekar Brothers received a diktat from the Censor Board over a film scene. The Censor Board had raised issues during the screening of the film over a scene in which one of the Chapekar Brothers had killed a Christian Missionary forcing Hindus to convert into Christianity during the British Raj. The filmmakers objected to this diktat by showing references of a Marathi film ’22 June 1897’ released in the year 1979 depicting the same scene. Post that incident, MNS President Raj Thackeray has pledged his full support to the movie and slammed the Censor Board.
