= Chandra Shekhar Azad (disambiguation) =

Chandra Shekhar Azad was an Indian revolutionary.

Chandra Shekhar Azad may also refer to:

- Chandrashekhar Azad (politician)

== See also ==
- Hero of Nation Chandra Shekhar Azad, 2022 film
- Chandra Shekhar Azad University of Agriculture and Technology
- Chandra Shekhar Azad Park
