= Jai Jawaan Jai Kisaan (film) =

- Theatrical release poster
- Directed by: Milan Ajmera
- Screenplay by: Dhiraj Mishra
- Story by: Rohit Rao
- Produced by: Madan Lal Khurana; Seema Chakerverty; Pankaj Dua
- Starring: Om Puri; Prem Chopra; Rati Agnihotri; Jatin Khurana; Akhilesh Jain; Aakarshan Agrawal
- Cinematography: Bimal Dave
- Music by: Rupesh; Girish
- Release date: 6 February 2015
- Country: India
- Language: Hindi

Jai Jawaan Jai Kisaan (transl. Hail the soldier, hail the farmer) is a 2015 Indian Hindi-language biographical drama film directed by Milan Ajmera. It is based on the life of former Indian Prime Minister Lal Bahadur Shastri and is titled after his popular slogan of the same name.

== Cast ==
- Jatin Khurana as Chandrashekhar Azad
- Avinash Kumar as Sukhdev
- Om Puri as Dr. Rajendra Prasad.
- Prem Chopra as Pt. Govind Ballabh Pant
- Rati Agnihotri as Rajalakshmi Pandit
- Rishi Bhutani as Pt. Jawaharlal Nehru
- Rati Agnihotri as Vijaya Lakshmi Pandit
- Akhilesh Jain as Lal Bahadur Shastri
  - Ajit Khare as younger Lal Bahadur Shastri
  - Manoj Bhatt as youngest Lal Bahadur Shastri
- Jaiwant Patekar as Mahatma Gandhi
- Imran Hasnee as Nishkameshwar Prasad Mishra
- Mandeep Kohli as Indira Gandhi
- Neha Sharma as Lalita Shastri
- Kanchan Awasthi as Lalita Shastri's sister-in-law
- Shalini Arora as Ram Dulari Sinha
- Aarti Tyagi as Lal Bahadur Shastri's aunt

== Production ==
Theatre actor from Bhopal Akhilesh Jain was selected to essay the role of Lal Bahadur Shastri.

=== Filming ===
The shoot of Jai Jawaan Jai Kisaan began in April 2013, and it was filmed at various locations in Allahabad, Mumbai and Delhi.

== Release ==
The film was released on February 6, 2015.

== Soundtrack ==
Jai Jawaan Jai Kisaan

Soundtrack album by Rupesh, Girish
- Released: 16 January 2015
- Recorded: 2013
- Genre: Feature film soundtrack
- Length: 20:04
- Label: Zee Music
- Producer: Rupesh, Girish

This soundtrack album has both patriotic and fun songs. The biggest highlight of the album is "Saj Ke Chali Hai Bharat Maan", sung by Javed Ali. Aman Trikha has sung "Mere Desh Ka Javaab Nahi". Rupesh and Girish are the composers of all the songs and Kishan Paliwal is the lyricist.

No.	Title	Lyrics	Singer(s)	Length
1.	"Saj Ke Chali Hai Bharat"	Kishan Paliwal	Javed Ali	6:32
2.	"Mere Desh Ka Javaab Nahi"	Kishan Paliwal	Aman Trikha	3:54
3.	"Aahun Aahun"	Kishan Paliwal	Vinod Rathore	4:00
4.	"Jai Jawaaj Jai Kisaan" (Title))	Kishan Paliwal	Suresh Anand Omprakash Mishra	4:45
5.	"Ganga Maiya"	Kishan Paliwal	Saaveri Verma	1:33
Total length:				20:04

== See also ==
- List of artistic depictions of Mahatma Gandhi
