= Tauba Tera Jalwa =

- Directed by: Akashaditya Lama
- Written by: Akashaditya Lama
- Produced by: Naresh Bansal; Madanlal Khurana
- Starring: Jatin Khurana; Ameesha Patel; Angela Krislinzki
- Cinematography: Shakil Khan
- Edited by: Sanjay Sankla
- Music by: Vikram Montrose
- Production companies: Shreeram Productions; Victorious Enterprises
- Release date: 5 January 2024
- Running time: 130 minutes
- Country: India
- Language: Hindi

Tauba Tera Jalwa is a 2024 Hindi-language romantic comedy film written and directed by Akashaditya Lama and produced by Naresh Bansal and Madanlal Khurana under Shreeram Productions and Victorious Enterprises. It stars Jatin Khurana, Ameesha Patel and Angela Krislinzki.

Tauba Tera Jalwa was theatrically released in India on 5 January 2024.

== Cast ==
- Jatin Khurana as Romy Tyagi
- Ameesha Patel as Laila
- Angela Krislinzki as Rinku
- Anil Rastogi as Bharat Singh
- Rajesh Sharma as Professor

== Soundtrack ==
The film's music was composed by Vikram Montrose. Lyrics were written by Kunwar Juneja.

== Release ==
=== Theatrical ===
Tauba Tera Jalwa was theatrically released on 5 January 2024.
