= Ye Stupid Pyar =

2011 film by Rakesh Jain

- Film poster
- Directed by: Rakesh Jain
- Written by: Rakesh Jain
- Produced by: M.L. Khurana; Rakesh Jain
- Starring: Jatin Khurana; Noopur Patwardhan; Akansha Shivhare; Sahil Vaid; Pummy
- Edited by: Rajesh Khanchi
- Music by: Vipin Patwa; Reeky Dev
- Release date: 9 December 2011
- Running time: 107 minutes
- Country: India
- Language: Hindi

Ye Stupid Pyar is a 2011 Bollywood romantic film directed by Rakesh Jain, starring debutants Jatin Khurana in lead role. It was produced by M.L. Khurana and Rakesh Jain under the banner of JRD Films.

== Synopsis ==
Abhishek Khurana (Jatin Khurana) is an NRI based in the US with a high-profile MNC job. He comes to India for a short trip of two weeks and meets a salsa instructor cum gym trainer at a gym. He falls in love with her and joins salsa classes to get closer to her. Soon the two get married. On the wedding night itself, Neha emotionally blackmails him into moving to Bangkok instead of the US. She tells that she doesn't want to go far off from her parents and Abhishek transfers his job from the US office to Bangkok. The newlywed couple then flew to Bangkok.

In Bangkok, when Abhishek returns from his office the very first day, he finds Neha missing. He starts searching for her with the help of his college best friend Simran (Akansha Shivhare). Simran had feelings for Abhishek right from the college days, but he is unaware of it. Simran seeks help from her friend Multiplex (Sahil Vaid) to locate Neha. It turns out that Neha left Abhishek because she loves another guy Rajveer who lives in Bangkok.

== Cast ==
- Jatin Khurana as Abhishek Khurana
- Akansha Shivhare as Rajveer
- Sahil Vaid as Simran
- Pummy as Abhishek's mother
- Stephanie MacDonald as the Item girl

== Soundtrack ==
The music for Ye Stupid Pyar is composed by Vipin Patwa and Reeky Dev.

Track listing
No.	Title	Lyrics	Music	Singer(s)	Length
1.	"Lamha Lamha"	Sanjay Mishra	Vipin Patwa	Nikhil D'Souza	04:42
2.	"Tere Naam Se"	Yusuf Ali Khan	Vipin Patwa	KK (singer)	04:35
3.	"Aana Meri Zindagi Mein"	Sanjay Mishra	Reeky Dev	Reeky Dev	02:51
4.	"Ishq Da Mausam"	Sanjay Mishra	Vipin Patwa	Master Saleem, Ritu Pathak	03:29
5.	"Mehroom Hoon Main"	Yusuf Ali Khan	Vipin Patwa	Shaan, Manjeera Ganguli	03:33
6.	"Stupid Pyar"	Arafat Mahmood	Vipin Patwa	Shreya Ghoshal, Vipin Patwa	03:37
7.	"Maskara Sexy"	Arafat Mahmood	Reeky Dev	Arun Daga, Sasha	03:46
Total length:					26:33

== Critical reception ==
Komal Nahta from Koimoi gave the film only 0.5 stars out of 5. He mentioned the story as childish, screenplay immature and dialogues commonplace. According to him, the histrionics of the lead pair was dull and ordinary. He only applauded Akansha Shivhare's performance. He wrote that it was a poor film and lacked entertainment.

Zinnia Ray Chaudhuri from Daily News and Analysis also gave only 0.5/5 stars. She wrote that the movie is bad throughout and leaves the audience emotionally scarred. According to her, Jatin has no acting skills. Only Akansha was able to leave an impact. She wrote,"The dialogues and the dialogue delivery, both, are laughable and can be best described as cheesy". She also criticized cinematography and dubbing.

Prateeksha Khot from BOLLYSPICE gave only 0.5/5 stars. She wrote,"The acting is amateurish, cinematography by M.A. Shaikh is grainy and sloppy, Rajesh Kanchi’s editing is so-so and choreography by Tejas Dattani, Reshma Khan, Sagar-Bape and Rajiv are strictly average." According to her, the script is silly, music decent and dialogues are just ordinary. She praised Akansha in her minuscule role and mentioned Pummy's portrayal of a loving mother outstanding.

Mansha Rastogi from Nowrunning.com gave only 0.5/5 stars. She wrote,"Having a half-cooked plot replete with non-actors and no graph whatsoever, Rakesh turns YSP from a bad to a worse and intolerable product." She heavily criticized the performance of the lead actor and other side actors. According to her, even in the shooting style and the narrative, there appears no aesthetics. She also condemned the music and background score.

Rohit Vats from ibnlive also had apprehensions and he was not impressed with the basic plot line and acting performances. Even the album seemed to be a half-hearted effort.
