= Mangala Devi Temple, Kagpur, Vidisha =

Coordinates: 23.74°N 77.80°E

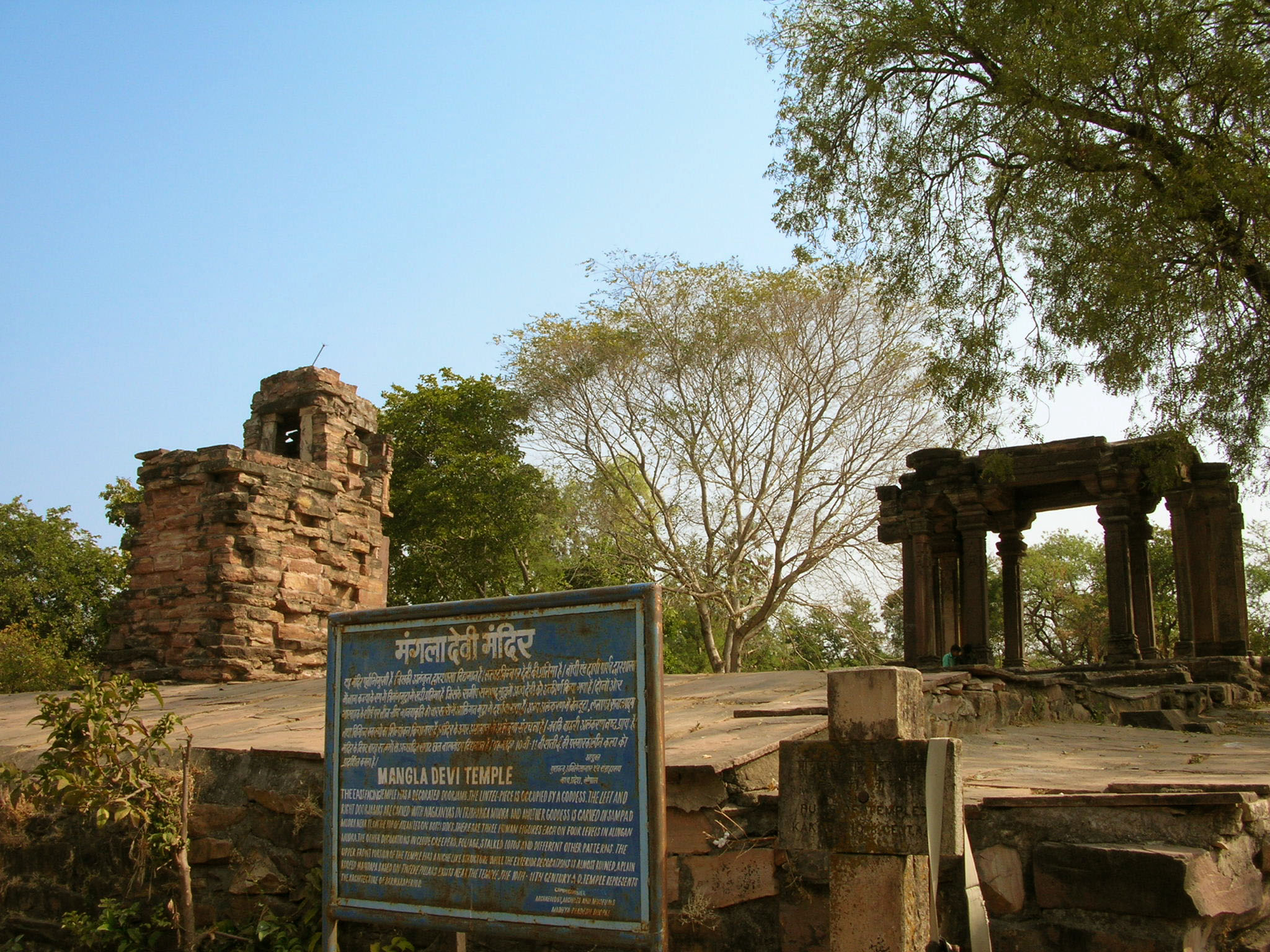
The ruins of the temple

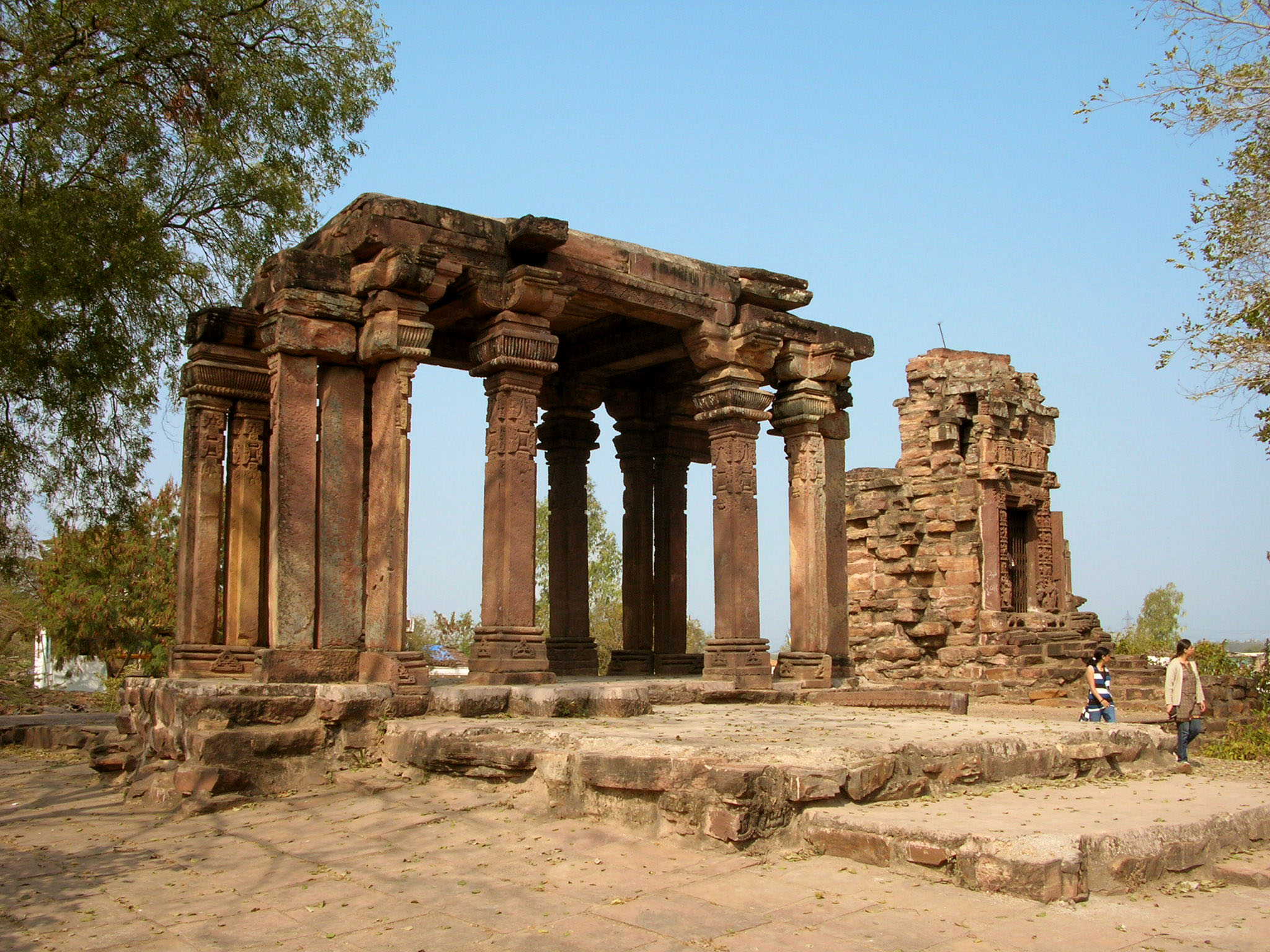
The mandapa

Mangla Devi Temple is a ruined Hindu temple in the Kagpur village of Vidisha District, Madhya Pradesh, India. It is located on the State Highway 19, 33 km from Vidisha.

== Architecture ==
The temple was constructed in the Paramara period during the 10-11th century CE. The installation of the image of Mangala Devi dates back to 1306.

The temple also features images of a Nagakanya (a Nāga girl) in tribhanga mudra, another goddess in sthanak sampad mudra and three human figures in alingan. The other decorations include vines, leaf, stalked lotus and other patterns.

The temple premises have a mandapa with flat roof, supported by twelve pillars.
