= Shalini Arora =

Indian television actress

- Born: Lucknow, Uttar Pradesh, India
- Occupation: Actress

Shalini Arora is an Indian actress. She is best known for her roles Paap Shakti Rakshindra in Aryamaan – Brahmaand Ka Yodha and as Ramdulari Devi, the mother of Lal Bahadur Shastri in Jai Jawaan Jai Kisaan (2015) a biopic about the former Prime Minister of India.

== Television ==
- 2002 Aryamaan – Brahmaand Ka Yodha as Paap Shakti Rakshindra
- 2007-08 Kashmakash Zindagi Ki
- 2009–11 Pavitra Rishta
- 2010–11 Geeta as Manorama Bhagat
- 2011–12 Phulwa as Thakurian
- 2013 Pavitra Bandhan as Pishimaa
- 2014 Madhubala – Ek Ishq Ek Junoon as Baiji Kushwaha
- 2014–15 Balika Vadhu as Suman Kabra
- 2015 Bhagyalaxmi as Janki
- 2015 Diya Aur Baati Hum as Yashoda
- 2016–17 Ek Shringaar-Swabhiman as Asha Rathod
- 2017 Woh Apna Sa as Sharda Khurana Jindal
- 2018 Ishq Subhan Allah as Salma Baig Siddiqui
- 2019 Nazar as Jaya Rathod Khanna
- 2023-2024 Tose Naina Milai Ke as Prabha

== Movies ==
- Zameen (2003)
- Muskkaan (2004)
- Jai Jawaan Jai Kisaan (2015) as Ramdulari Devi
- Fuddu (2016)
