= Lafzon Mein Pyaar =

- Official release poster
- Directed by: Dhiraj Mishra; Raja Randeep Giri
- Story by: Dhiraj Mishra; Yashomati Devi
- Produced by: Ashok Sawhny
- Starring: Anita Raj; Zarina Wahab; Amir Ali Shaik; Vivek Aanand Mishra; Kanchan Rajput; Parshant Rai; Lalit Parmoo; Sarwar Mir; Vaani Dogra; Megha Joshi
- Cinematography: Birchandan Singh
- Edited by: Parkash Jha
- Music by: Ranjeet Rajwada
- Release date: 4 August 2023
- Country: India
- Language: Hindi

Lafzon Mein Pyaar is a 2023 Indian Hindi-language film directed by Dhiraj Mishra and Raja Randeep Giri and produced by Ashok Sawhny starring Zarina Wahab and Anita Raj. It was released on 4 August 2023.

== Synopsis ==
The film Lafzon Mein Pyaar revolves around a love story. The protagonist, Raj, leaves his studies midway, much to the disappointment of his family, except his supportive sister-in-law, Geeta Bhabhi. She encourages him to explore new paths through music. Raj's life takes a new turn when Priya enters his life, bringing excitement to his otherwise calm existence. Raj becomes a famous poet, he falls in love with Priya. However, his family wants him to marry Shivani, which puts Raj's life at a crossroads.

== Cast ==
- Anita Raj as Durga Bhabhi
- Zarina Wahab as Devki
- Amir Ali Shaik as Friend
- Vivek Anand Mishra as Raj
- Kanchan Rajput as Priya
- Prashant Rai as Mayank
- Lalit Parimoo as Kishan lal
- Mir Sarwar as Narendra

== Production ==
The film Lafzon Mein Pyaar is directed by Dhiraj Mishra and Raja Randeep Giri and produced by Ashok Sawhny. Lyrics by Ashok Sawhny Sahil, singer and composer by Ranjeet Rajwada, background score for the film is composed by Pankaj V Saini and Shyam Sarthi. The screenplay and dialogue are by Dhiraj Mishra and Yashomati Devi, Cinematographer by Birchandan Singh, Choreography by Sarika Shirodkar and editing by Parkash Jha. The shooting for Lafzon Mein Pyaar has been completed. The film was shot in various locations, including Bhaderwah and Jammu and Kashmir, Jai Ghati, Gul Danda, and Mumbai.
