= Desabhaktan =

Tamil daily newspaper (1917–1920s)

- Type: Daily newspaper
- Founder: M. Subbaroya Kamath
- Founded: September 1917
- Language: Tamil
- Headquarters: Madras, British India

Desabhaktan was a Tamil-language daily newspaper published in Madras from 1917 until the late 1920s. It was an evening paper, founded as a Tamil version of Annie Besant's New India. It was the propaganda organ of the Madras Presidency Association for Home Rule propaganda.

It started in September 1917, from its own press in Royapettah. Its first editor was Tiru V. Kalyanasundaram Mudaliar, who brought pure Tamil to the paper and made it first with the news. It carried the Jallianwala Bagh story first, and got into trouble with the authorities.

The government demanded extra security from the paper, issued memos against its writings, and later forfeited its security for articles published in 1918. That action added to its financial strain.

Kalyanasundaram quit in July 1920. He was succeeded by V. V. S. Aiyar, under whom the writing became more fiery and the paper overtook Swadesamitran in circulation. Kamath then sold the paper to S. Nageswara Sastri. Aiyar quit in August 1921, and the paper folded in the late 1920s.
