= S. S. Setlur =

Indian lawyer, judge, journalist, and freedom fighter

Justice S. S. Setlur
- Setlur Śrinivāsiyengar
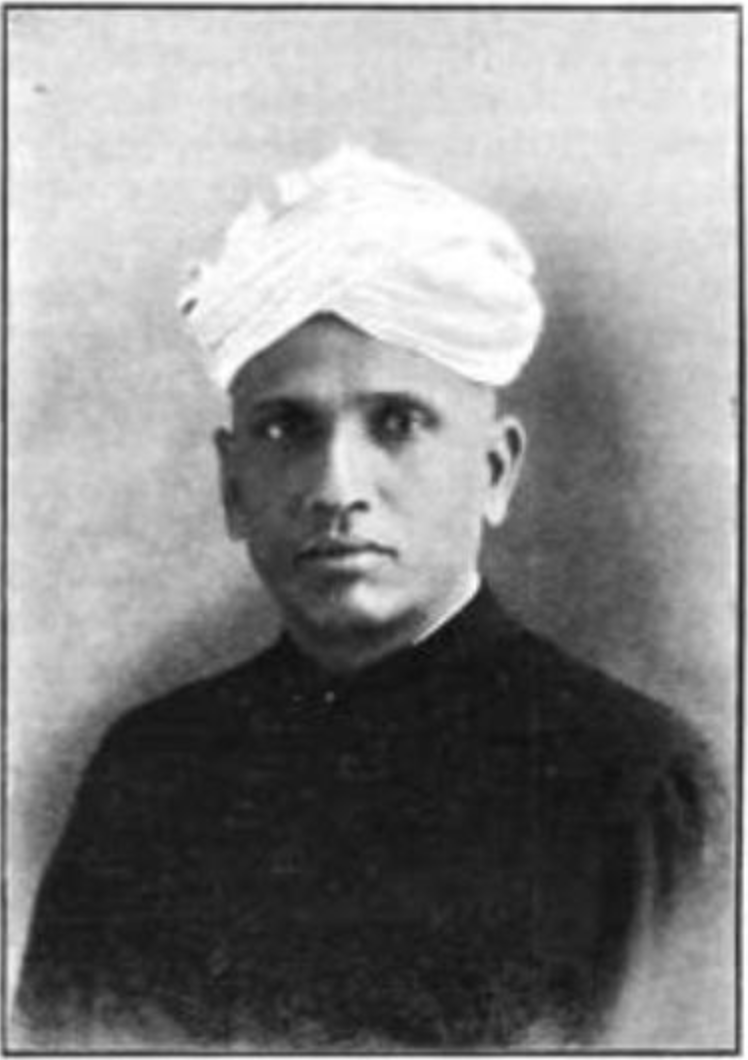
- Born: 21 July 1862
- Died: 10 January 1930 (aged 67); Bangalore
- Education: B.A. (1887), LL.B. (1891)
- Alma mater: Presidency College, Madras; Bombay University
- Occupations: Lawyer and judge
- Known for: First president of Congress party in Mysore state (1921); association with Bal Gangadhar Tilak; works on Hindu inheritance law
- Works: A Full and Authentic Report of the Trial of The Hon'ble Mr. Bal Gangadhar Tilak (1897); A Complete Collection of Hindu Law Books on Inheritance (1911); The Mitākshara, with Visvarūpa and Commentaries of Subodhini and Bālambhatti (1912)
- Movement: Indian independence movement
- Father: Setlur Singiengar (Shingaiengar)
- Relatives: Sargur Srihari (great grandson)

S. Srinivasiyengar Setlur (21 July 1862 – 10 January 1930), widely known as S. S. Setlur, was an Indian lawyer, judge, journalist, and freedom fighter. As a lawyer in Bombay (now Mumbai), Setlur was a close associate of Bal Gangadhar Tilak and served as the Bombay correspondent for The Hindu. He was later a justice of the Chief Court of Mysore (now the Karnataka High Court) and became the first president of the Mysore state chapter of the Indian National Congress.

Setlur was also an expert on Hindu inheritance laws, preparing both a landmark compilation of ancient texts and a translation of the Mitākshara, an important text on inheritance, that are still in use today.

== Background and education ==
Setlur was a member of the Sri Vaishnava Brahmin community. His family came to princely Mysore and settled at Seringapatam (modern Srirangapatna) in the 18th century. His father was Setlur Singiengar, who provided "highly approved services" to the British administration in various parts of the Madras Presidency before joining the Mysore government as the Marhamat (or Maramuth) Bakshi (Chief Engineer) of the state. Singiengar retired as Anche Bukshi or Postmaster-General in 1867, and his "extensive cosmpolitan charities" in Tirupati, North Arcot, and several parts of Mysore State had "rendered his name a household word in Mysore."

Setlur studied at the Presidency College in Madras (now Chennai), graduating with a degree in arts (B.A.) in January 1887. After taking a course in the B.Sc. class in the Science College, Poona, he eventually obtained his law degree (LL.B.) from Bombay University in 1890. While studying law, in December 1889 he won Judge Spencer's prize and the Arnould Scholarship by placing first in the Presidency and first in Hindu law.

== Career in Bombay ==
Setlur spent a good portion of his life in Bombay (now Mumbai) and was a leading lawyer there. In 1892, he was enrolled as an advocate in the Bombay and Madras High Courts. He was a law professor for four years (1903-07) at the Government Law School where he lectured on Hindu law, an examiner for High Court examinations, and an examiner in Kanarese (Kannada) for Bombay University where he was a fellow. He was also active in local civic life, being a member of the Royal Asiatic Society, serving as an honorary secretary of the local chess tournament, judging an elocution contest (in Marathi), and even signing a letter of protest against the resumption of animal sacrifices for the Dasara festival in Porbandar. His friends and associates included N. C. Kelkar and Pherozeshah Mehta.

Setlur was also an active journalist and writer. He was the Bombay correspondent for The Hindu (based in Madras) and edited English language columns for the Indu Prakash, an Anglo-Marathi journal published in Bombay. He also sent letters to other publications. He was a delegate to the seventh Bombay Provincial Conference held in November 1894, and was later a delegate to the eleventh conference in 1901.

=== Trial of Bal Gangadhar Tilak ===
In September 1897, Bal Gangadhar Tilak was tried for sedition in the Bombay High Court. Setlur took an active interest in Tilak's defense, and later published a complete report of the trial with a lengthy introduction that included some of his personal observations. In Setlur's view, the prosecution of Tilak resulted from "panic among the European community" caused by the recent killings of two British officers in Poona by the Chapekar brothers; Setlur himself would later defend Balkrishna Hari Chapekar in his murder trial two years later. The Tilak trial report was priced at 10 annas, a low price intended to make it widely available to the Indian public, with profits designated for Tilak's defense fund.

A London newspaper, the St. James's Gazette, was critical of Setlur's report, calling it "mischief which is allowed to run riot under the name of freedom of the Press." The Gazette added that "while purporting to be a 'report' of the trial, it is mainly a glorification of Tilak, and holds up the judgment of the court which tried him to native ridicule and contempt." The Pioneer of Allahabad was also critical of Setlur, finding that he had committed "a great many popular errors" and concluding that the trial result was the product of "independent mature deliberation" about which "no one has any right to complain."

While Setlur noted that he "did not know Mr. Tilak personally before the trial," he would ultimately become a staunch follower of Tilak. After the trial, Setlur served as one of his legal advisors and when Tilak quickly lost weight in prison, Setlur wrote to the Howard Association in London, eventually leading to some improvement in Tilak's conditions. In 1915, a dying Gopal Krishna Gokhale, who had his differences with Tilak, would ask Setlur to seek a compromise with Tilak to achieve Congress party unity.

== Hindu inheritance law ==
Setlur was a leading scholar of Hindu law relating to inheritances and contributed to the law journal of the Bombay Presidency. In 1907, a response by Setlur to an article on the origin of the Bengal School of Hindu law was published by the Law Quarterly Review, one of London's leading law journals. Setlur argued that the reason Bengal's inheritance laws differed from the Mitākshara school of the other Indian provinces was due to different historical circumstances, rather than different interpretations of the same original ancient Hindu texts.

In 1911, Setlur's A Complete Collection of Hindu Law Books on Inheritance was published. The treatise includes a nearly 30-page introduction by Setlur followed by English translations and analysis of all important texts recognized as authorities in different schools of Hindu law. A review in the Madras Weekly Notes observed that this was the first volume to present most of the seventeen included texts in accurate English translations, and that it would enable lawyers to compare what different writers had to say on a given point. Setlur's treatise was widely influential and was cited by the Supreme Court of India as recently as 1980.

Setlur had a "keen interest in the advancement of Sanskrit knowledge" and was himself "a Sanskrit scholar of ability." In 1912, he edited a comprehensive edition of the Mitākshara and related texts and commentaries in both Sanskrit and English. Setlur's edition of the Mitākshara has had significant influence in the field to the present day.

== Chief Court justice and freedom fighter ==
Setlur eventually left Bombay for Bangalore. He became an acquaintance of Swami Vivekananda and shared his reflections in a letter to the Madras Mail upon the latter's passing in 1902.

In 1908, the Dewan of Mysore, Sir V. P. Madhava Rao, appointed Setlur as one of three justices of the Mysore Chief Court, and the appointment was "met with general satisfaction in the Province." Upon taking his seat on 24 July 1908, Setlur expressed appreciation to the Mysore Bar, observing that "[m]ost of your members have been well known to me from my boyhood, and I am glad I have come back to my people...." While the appointment was temporary to relieve a justice who had gone on leave, he was reappointed for one year in November as the fourth judge. Later, the British Resident in Mysore, Sir Stuart Fraser, objected to the appointment due to Setlur's links with Tilak, eventually leading Setlur to resign his judgeship. Setlur would later visit London in 1915, leaving for his return journey to Bombay on 13 November on the P&O ship RMS Arabia.

From 1914 to 1923, Setlur was a regular columnist for Annie Besant's newspaper, New India. In February 1916, he attended Mahatma Gandhi's first public speech in India, on the occasion of laying the foundation stone for the Banares Hindu University. Gandhi did not finish the speech after being interrupted by Besant, who claimed she was protecting him from the authorities. In a letter to The Hindu, Setlur said that while Gandhi was not encouraging anarchists, he was instead "playing the role of an apologist for the Civilian Bureaucrat." Setlur went on to criticize much of the speech's substance and Gandhi's delivery. In a public response to Besant, Gandhi called Setlur's criticism "in some respects totally unfair" and that Setlur had "endeavoured to tear me to pieces." As part of a further reply to Gandhi, Besant herself re-published Setlur's letter.

Setlur would go on to found the Congress party in princely Mysore in 1921 and serve as its first president. When three freedom fighters were killed while picketing in Dharwad on 1 July 1921, Setlur served on a three-member inquiry committee appointed by the All India Congress Committee. In February 1922, he and other Congress leaders were served with notices under Section 144 of the Criminal Procedure Code relating to unlawful assembly. In December 2022, he called for an end to Congress' state-level work and resigned as the Mysore Congress Committee president, but his suggestions were not accepted by the committee.

Setlur continued writing in his later years. In December 1923, the Bombay Chronicle published a lengthy essay in which he critiqued the new constitution of Mysore. In 1927, Setlur led a group known as the "Sanatan Nationalists" with Hindu nationalist views.

Setlur resided in the Siddikatte area of Bangalore (present day Gundopanth Street) while continuing to own land elsewhere. He died at his residence in Siddikatte on the morning of 10 January 1930 (possibly 9 January) after a five-month battle with stomach cancer, and was survived by his wife, six sons and three daughters. A street in Bangalore's Richmond Town neighborhood may have been named after him or an ancestor.
