= Listen... Amaya =

- Directed by: Avinash Kumar Singh
- Written by: Geeta Singh; Avinash Kumar Singh; Vikas Chandra
- Story by: Geeta Singh
- Produced by: Ashok Sawhny
- Starring: Farooq Shaikh; Deepti Naval; Swara Bhaskar
- Cinematography: Ramshreyas Rao
- Edited by: Geeta Singh
- Music by: Indraneel Hariharan; Punam Hariharan (lyrics)
- Production company: Turtle on a Hammock Films
- Distributed by: Turtle on a Hammock Films
- Release date: 1 February 2013 (India)
- Running time: 108 minutes
- Country: India
- Language: Hindi

Listen... Amaya is a 2013 Hindi drama film directed by Avinash Kumar Singh, and starring Farooq Shaikh, Deepti Naval and Swara Bhaskar as leads. The film also marks the return of popular lead pair of the 1980s, Farooq Shaikh and Deepti Naval, in films like, Chashme Buddoor (1981), Saath Saath (1982), and Katha (1983), together again on screen after 25 years. This was also their last film together, as Farooq Shaikh died several months after the film's release.

== Plot ==
The film is set in Delhi, where a widowed mother, Leela, runs the library cafe "Book a Coffee." Here she makes a new friend, a widowed photographer, Jayant "Jazz," and soon finds their friendship growing. However, Leela's daughter, Amaya, a budding writer, feels insecure about the relationship when she finds out about it. While she collaborates with Jazz on producing a coffee table book about the bazaars of Old Delhi, when her mother takes her relationship with Jazz further, she is unable to accept it. The journeys of all the principal characters and a subtle twist at the end make up the narrative of the film.

== Cast ==
- Farooq Shaikh as Jayant Sinha
- Deepti Naval as Leela Krishnamoorthy
- Swara Bhaskar as Amaya Krishnamoorthy
- Amala Akkineni as Sujata
- Siddhant Karnick as Raghav
- Shadab Khan as Tariq
- Oroon Das as Abhay
- Kriti Panth as Devika
- Vidya Bhushan as Rizwaan bhai
- Viren Basoya as Rahmat

== Production ==
The film was shot mostly in Delhi, with a schedule of the filming of the lead pair shot in Delhi in September 2011. A song sequence, featuring Swara Bhaskar and Siddhant Karnick and based on a re-rendition of Ek Ladki Bheegi Bhaagi Si, was filmed in Mumbai. Listen... Amaya was filmed on the Arri Alexa digital camera system and was shot in 29 days, including all the songs. Except for some grips, all the equipment and crew on the film were from Mumbai.

External-location filming on the film ranged from shooting in Chandni Chowk over two days, outside Priya Cinema complex, in Hauz Khas village, in Khan Market in South Delhi, on streets of South Delhi, in an air-conditioned DTC bus service, on inside and main roads of Sundar Nagar, as well as in Pathways world school.

The picturisation of the song in Mumbai was choreographed by Longiness Fernandez and was shot over two days on sets erected in a studio in Mumbai.

== Release ==
The film released theatrically across India on 1 February 2013.

It has also screened at the New York Indian Film Festival (NYIFF), London Asian Film Festival (Tongues on Fire), Chicago South Asian Film Festival (CSAFF), New Jersey Independent South Asian Cine Fest (NJISACF), India International Film Festival (IIFF) of Tampa Bay, the Washington DC South Asian Film Festival (DCSAFF), the Mosaic International South Asian Film Festival (MISAFF) in August 2013, as part of the Indian Panorama section of the 44th International Film Festival of India in Goa during the month of November 2013. and the Honolulu Bollywood Film Festival in January 2014.

Listen... Amaya was screened at the NCPA Mumbai to a full house on 21 June 2013 as part of the Fresh Pix series.

Listen... Amaya was also screened for the Bimal Roy Foundation in Mumbai on 17 August 2013.

The film was released to DVD on 10 June 2013 by MAGNA Home Video. Subsequent to the release, the agreement between Magna Home Video and the producers was terminated after the Bombay High Court ruled in favour of the producers, due to Magna Publishing having violated the terms of agreement between both parties.

It is also available across a wide variety of Inflight entertainments on a number of Domestic and International airlines.

== Music ==
Listen Amaya

Soundtrack album by Indraneel Hariharan
- Released: 26 December 2012
- Genre: Feature film soundtrack
- Length: 18:18
- Language: Hindi
- Label: Saregama
External audio
- Audio Jukebox on YouTube

The soundtrack of the film was released by the label Saregama. The music director of the film is Indraneel Hariharan and the lyrics were written by his wife Punam Hariharan.

The soundtrack has a total of 5 songs on it, with a re-rendition of the popular yesteryear hit, Ek ladki bheegi bhaagi si, sung by Kunal Ganjawalla. Kunal Ganjawalla also sang another track on the film titled Kashmakash. Vidhi Sharma lent her voice to the song Mann ki Patang, which was also rendered in an acoustic version, sung by the composer himself under the end titles of the film. Hey Hey Hey Mrs K is the first song on the soundtrack sung by Ankur Sabharwal, Vidhi Sharma, Jeetendra Singh Jamwal and Indraneel Hariharan. The music reviews were good, with the consensus being that Mann ki Patang was the pick of the album.

Mann Ki Patang (rendition) composed and sung by Indraneel Hariharan is nominated at the prestigious Global Indian Music Awards, GiMA 2013, for Best Debut as a Music Composer.

All lyrics are written by Punam Hariharan; all music is composed by Indraneel Hariharan.

Songs
No.	Title	Playback	Length
1.	"Ek Ladki Bheegi Bhaagi Si" (re-rendition)	Kunal Ganjawala	03:42
2.	"Hey Hey Hey Mrs K"	Ankur Sabharwal, Vidhi Sharma, Jeetendra Singh Jamwal, Indraneel Hariharan	03:53
3.	"Kashmakash"	Kunal Ganjawala	03:57
4.	"Mann Ki Patang"	Vidhi Sharma	03:25
5.	"Mann Ki Patang" (rendition)	Indraneel Hariharan	03:21

== Awards ==
- Best Film (NJISACF)
- Best Director (NJISACF)
- Best Director (DCSAFF)
- Best Actress (NYIFF)

== Reception ==
The film received good reviews, including CNN-IBN which called the film "enormously heartwarming", while giving the film a 3 out 5 rating. Oneindia also praised the film, stating, "Kudos to Avinash Kumar Singh for handling such a sensitive topic so brilliantly. The movie is neither too preachy nor too over dramatised." Madhureeta Mukherjee gives it 3 out of 5 stars for the Times of India, stating "Avinash Kumar Singh has sensitively handled a strong subject textured with social and psychological complexities. His characters peel layers of emotions, without over-dramatizing scenes, or amplifying the issue. It is subtle and sincere."
