= 22 June 1897 =

1979 film

- Poster
- Directed by: Jayoo Patwardhan; Nachiket Patwardhan
- Written by: Shankar Nag; Nachiket Patwardhan
- Produced by: Nachiket Patwardhan
- Starring: Sadashiv Amrapurkar; Udayan Dixit; Rod Gilbert; John Irving; Ravindra Mankani; Prabhakar Patankar
- Cinematography: Navroze Contractor
- Edited by: Madhu Sinha
- Music by: Anand Modak
- Release date: 1979
- Running time: 121 minutes
- Country: India
- Language: Marathi

22 June 1897 is a 1979 Marathi film co-written by Shankar Nag and Nachiket Patwardhan and directed by the husband and wife team of Jayoo Patwardhan and Nachiket Patwardhan. The duo are also practising architects. It is based on the true life story of the assassination of British Government officers Walter Charles Rand ICS and Lt. Charles Egerton Ayerst by the Chapekar brothers. The film has been included in the book One Hundred Indian Feature Films: An Annotated Filmography, a representative selection from the first Indian talkies to the then-present date (1988). The title of the film is the date of the assassination, 22 June 1897. It won the 1980 Indian Silver Lotus at the National Film Awards in two categories: Best film on National Integration and Art Direction. It also won the 1980 Maharashtra State awards for best film of the year and best director. The film has been included in the selected collection of Indian films and videos in the US Library of Congress. Most of the performers in the film then belonged to Theatre Academy, Pune.

== Plot ==
Poona was visited by the pestilence of bubonic plague which took a heavy toll of life. But the plague had another indirect and far-reaching consequence on the politics of the country. The behaviour of the military which was called out to deal with the situation arising from the pestilence caused great indignation.

On 22 June 1897, British officer Charles Walter Rand Assistant Collector of Pune and Chairman of the Special Plague Committee, Pune, and British Army officer Lieutenant Charles Egerton Ayerst, were assassinated on the Ganeshkhind road, Pune, on their way back from a Government house party celebrating the Diamond Jubilee anniversary of the coronation of Queen Victoria.

C. W. Rand of the ICS was appointed to take charge of the plague control measures and had successfully contained the epidemic; but his methods of evacuating the people, of fumigating their dwellings, and burning the contaminated articles, evoked tremendous hatred amongst certain sections of the society, which led to his assassination.

The climax scene is the shooting after the party has finished at midnight. The carriages started moving out of the Government House, and one of the boys in that group watched from outside the gate. As Rand came out, he gave the signal. Another boy began running with the carriage. As he reached the spot where Damodar, Balkrishna, and others were waiting, he shouted to them 'Gondya ala re! (Gondya has come)'. Balkrishna jumped on the carriage and shot the occupant. But there was a mistake. It was Ayerst whom he had killed. They realised their mistake and when Rand's carriage came to the spot, Damodar climbed on it and shot Rand. Ayerst was killed on the spot, and Rand died in hospital on 3 July 1897.

== Cast ==
The cast of the film is as follows:

- Damodar Chapekar: Prabhakar Patankar.
- Vasudev Chapekar: Udayan Dixit.
- Hari Vinayak Chapekar: Vasudev Palande.
- Dwarka Hari Chapekar: Shanta Jog.
- Daughters-in-law : Arundhatti Rao, Sujal Watve, Dipali Kulkarni.
- Govind Mama: Satish Khare.
- Ranade: Sadanand Borse.
- Apte: Shrikant Gadre.
- Dutta Bhuskute: Suresh Bhasale.
- Ganesh Dravid: Jairam Hardikar.
- Ramchandra Dravid: Sanjiv Ambika.
- Nilu Dravid: Vikas Deshpande.
- Havaldar Rama Pandu: Mukund Chitale.
- Walter Rand: John Irving.
- Bal Gangadhar Tilak : Sadashiv Amrapurkar.
- Inspector Brewin: Rod Gilbert.
- Harry Falk (Indologist).
- Subhash Awchat.
- Balkrishna Chapekar: Ravindra Mankani.

== Production ==
"It was a learning experience for all of us, and the film launched my acting career". "It was a straight shot of nine minutes and 57 seconds without any retakes simply because we could not afford to waste footage"

— Balkrishna Chapekar on the film, 2006

The film is based on true life events leading up to, and the consequences of, the assassination of Charles Walter Rand, Assistant Collector of Pune and Chairman of the Special Plague Committee, Pune, and British Army officer Lt Charles Egerton Ayerst. Ayerst was Rand's military escort on 22 June 1897 by the Chapekar brothers – Damodar Hari, Vasudev Hari, and Balkrishna Hari and Mahadeo Vinayak Ranade, Khando Vishnu Sathe a schoolboy was charged as a co-conspirator and sentenced to 10 years rigorous imprisonment.

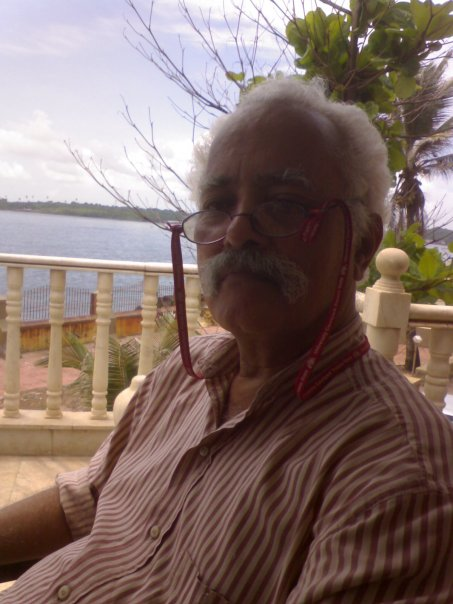
Film's director and producer Nachiket Patwardhan

The film was the directorial debut of Jayoo and Nachiket Patwardhan, commissioned by the National Film Development Corporation of India (NFDC) on a shoestring Rupees 350,000 budget. Jayoo Patwardhan scouted for locations in Wai and Pune for the period look, poring over scores of photographs obtained by her grandfather, and spending months researching the details. Most of the performers in the film belonged to Theater Academy, Pune. This film marked the debut of Balkrishna Chapekar, a then student of the College of Engineering, Pune. The film was shot entirely on locations in Pune, Wai and Mumbai in March and April 1979. Vijay Tendulkar its dialogue writer considered that "the film is significant because it shows the way history needs to be treated in cinema – in a deglam manner where martyrs are also shown as human beings".

=== Damodar Hari Chapekar's autobiography ===
Damodar Hari's narration of the shooting differs from the events as shown in the film. In his autobiography, Damodar Hari writes that he believed the jubilee celebrations would cause Europeans of all ranks to go to the Government House, and this would give them the opportunity to kill Rand. The brothers Damodar Hari and Balkrishna Hari selected a spot of Ganeshkhind road, by the side of a yellow bungalow to shoot at Rand. Each armed with a sword and a pistol. Balkrishna, in addition, carried a hatchet. They reached Ganeshkhind, they saw what looked like Rand's carriage pass by, but they let it go, not being sure, deciding to attack him on his way back. They reached Government House at 7.00–7.30 in the evening, as darkness was beginning to set in. A large number of people had gathered to witness the spectacle at Government House, and there were bonfires on the hills. The swords and the hatchet they carried made a movement without raising suspicion difficult, so they deposited them under a stone culvert near the bungalow, so as to retrieve it in case of need. As planned, Damodar Hari waited at the gate of the Government House, and as Rand's carriage emerged, ran 10–15 paces behind it. As the carriage reached the yellow bungalow, Damodar made up the distance and called out "Gondya", a predetermined signal for Balkrishna to take action. Damodar Hari undid the flap of the carriage, raised it and fired from a distance of about a span. It was originally planned that both would shoot at Rand, so as to ensure that Rand would not live, however, Balkrishna Hari lagged behind and Rand's carriage rolled on, Balkrishna Hari meanwhile on the suspicion that the occupants of the following carriage were whispering to each other, fired at the head of one of them from behind.

== Critical appreciation ==
The book One Hundred Indian Feature Films: An Annotated Filmography, calls the film, made by the Patwardhans, practising architects, a leaf out of history more as an exercise in cinema than in patriotism, faithful in every detail and structurally controlled, an unusual attempt at bringing a new visual perception into the mechanisms of film making. It finds the faces, mostly from Marathi stage, powerful in their authenticity, chiselled of grim determination, with firelight dancing on them, rugged stone walls, skirting narrow paths, the pillared inner courtyards of traditional dwellings, all into place in an intensely moving dramatic experience.

Gokulsing et al. write in their book Popular Indian Cinema, that the film cinematises a violent incident in Indian history, the determination of a group of Brahmin youths to challenge two of the elements of British imperialism – the English language and Christianity, the killing of Rand and events before and its aftermath. Mukta Rajadhyaksha, Mumbai based theatre and media critic, writing in The Times of India, considers this film an honourable exception amid the degeneration that Marathi cinema went through after its golden age, the decades of the 50s and 60s. She feels that the film should have won the Golden Lotus for best film, but did not as Marathi cinema, unlike cinema from Bengal and the South lacked a powerful lobby at the national level. Namrata Joshi writing for Outlook opines that commercial Marathi cinema did not benefit from arthouse films made by filmmakers like Jabbar Patel (Sinhasan, Umbartha), Jayoo and Nachiket Patwardhan (22 June 1897), Vijaya Mehta (Smriti Chitre), Amol Palekar (Bangarwadi), Sumitra Bhave and others.

film.at writes that while the Indian independence movement is known in the West only in connection with Mahatma Gandhi, the film tells one of the most important chapters of the early armed independence attempts in India. Spicevienna.org considers the film a modern classic of Indian cinema.

=== Video ===
The film was released on its 25th anniversary, by Rudraa Home Video in its 'Modern Classic' series on 22 June 2005, VCDs with English subtitles and each original VCD. It is listed under Best of Marathi cinema.

== Awards and recognition ==
- The film has been included in the book One Hundred Indian Feature Films: An Annotated Filmography, a representative selection from the first Indian talkies to the present day (1988).
- The film has been included in the selected list of Indian films and videos in the US Library of Congress. This collection is included in the Motion Picture, Broadcasting and Recorded Sound Division of the Library of Congress. The Library describes this collection as one of its richest and most interesting. This collection consists of ninety feature films and one hundred short films.

The film has been a winner of a couple of State and National Awards

=== National Film Awards: March 1980 ===
- Silver Lotus: Best Feature Film on National Integration
- Silver Lotus: Best Art Direction (Jayoo Patwardhan)

=== Maharashtra State Film Awards: March 1980 ===
- Best Film of the Year
- Best Director of the Year: Nachiket and Jayoo Patwardhan

=== Festival participation ===
- Calcutta '80: Regional Film Festival, April 1980
- Trivandrum, Kerala: Regional Film Festival, October 1980
- International Film Festivals at:
  - La Rochelle, France, June 1980
  - Montreal, Canada, August 1980
  - Mannheim, West Germany, October 1980
