= Sitapur the City of Gangster =

Sitapur The City Of Gangster
- Directed by: Mobeen Warsi
- Screenplay by: Mobeen Warsi
- Story by: Ravi Sudha Choudhary
- Produced by: Ravi Sudha Choudhary
- Starring: Ravi Sudha Choudhary; Anchal Pandey; Anil Rastogi
- Edited by: Akhilesh Mitra
- Production company: Rudransh Entertainment
- Release date: 13 August 2021
- Country: India
- Language: Hindi

Sitapur The City Of Gangster is a 2021 Indian Hindi film featuring Ravi Sudha Choudhary, Aparna Mallick and Gaurav Kumar. The Film is released on MX player.

== Production ==
Produced under the banner of Rudransh Entertainment, Sitapur The City Of Gangster is a crime drama. The film has been shot in Sitapur, Uttar Pradesh and Mumbai.

== Cast ==
- Ravi Sudha Choudhary
- Gaurav Kumar
- Anchal Pandey
- Aparna Mallick
- Anil Rastogi
- Jitendra Dwivedi
- Shalu Singh
- Shiva Shukla
