= Poets Corner Group =

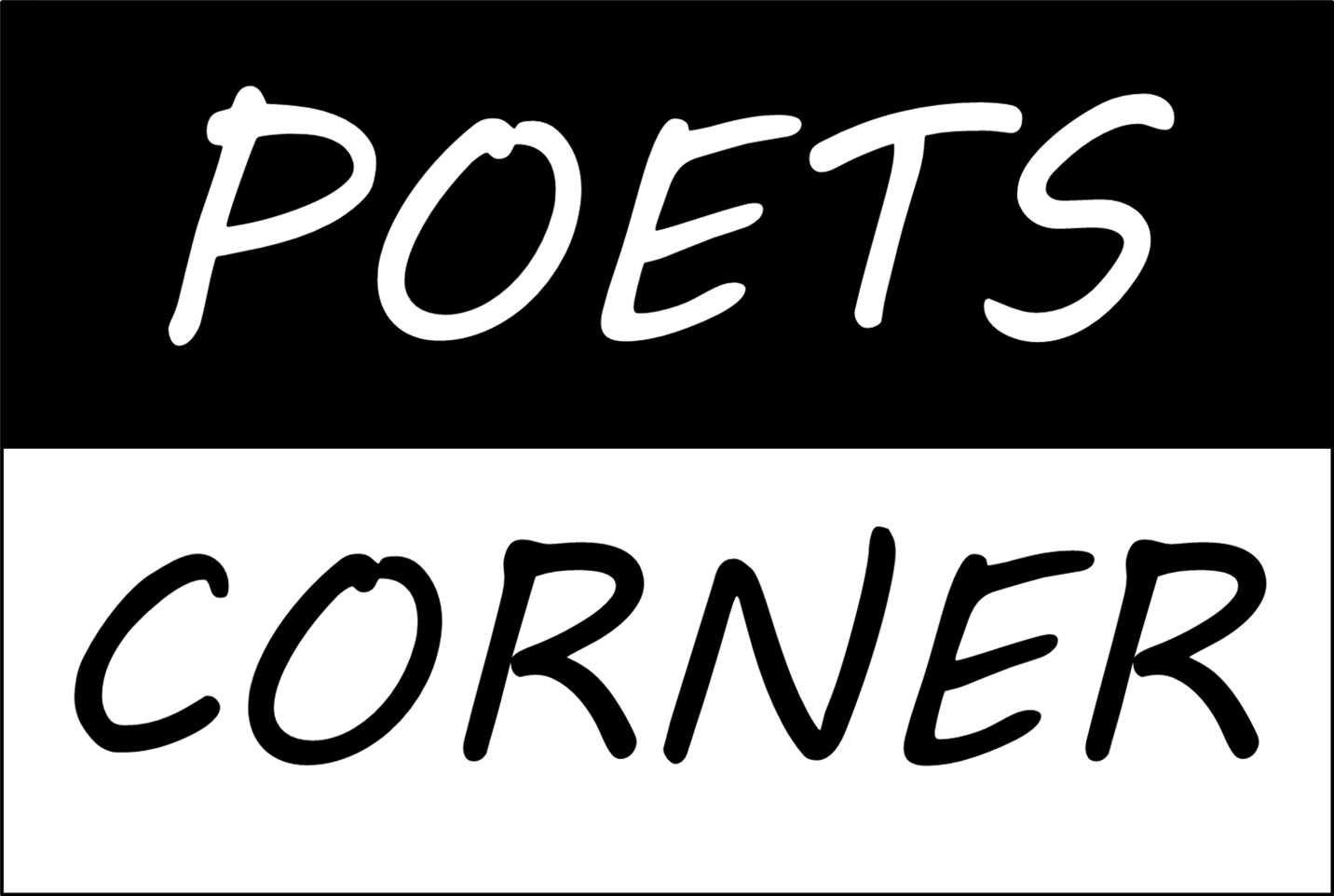
- Poets Corner's logo
- Founded: June 2011
- Founders: Yaseen Anwer and Dolly Singh
- Type: Literary Group
- Location: New Delhi, India
- Region served: India
- Website: www.poetscorner.in

Poets Corner Group is a poetry group in India. The group's main purpose is to make it easier for new and aspiring poets to be published. Since its advent, Poets Corner has published over 340 poets in 21 anthologies in both English and Hindi language.

The Poets Corner Group also hosts online competitions, poetry reading events, panel discussion, book launches, workshops, and other activities.

== History ==
Poets Corner was co-founded by Yaseen Anwer and Dolly Singh.

== Delhi Poetry Festival ==
Delhi Poetry Festival
- Genre: Poetry Festival
- Locations: New Delhi, India
- Years active: 2013 – present
- Website: http://delhipoetryfestival.org

Delhi Poetry Festival is an annual poetry event organized by Poets Corner in Delhi, first held on 19 January 2013.

=== 2013 Edition ===
Yaseen Anwer in conversation with Irshad Kamil at Delhi Poetry Festival 2013

The 2013 festival participants included:

- Irshad Kamil
- Abhishek Manu Singhvi
- Ashok Sawhny

=== 2014 Edition ===
The 2014 festival participants included:

- Sandeep Nath
- Janice Woods Windle

== Published work ==
The Poets Corner Group has published several poetry anthologies featuring young poets along with established poets including A. P. J. Abdul Kalam, Gulzar, Ruskin Bond, Nida Fazli, Vikram Seth, Irshad Kamil, Shashi Tharoor, Ravish Kumar, Deepti Naval, Shekhar Kapur, and Rahat Indori.

=== Books & anthologies ===
Inklinks

Gestures: Miscalculated Poetries by Misunderstood Poets

Aks: Tere Mere Khalayon Ka

Bikhri Os Ki Boondain

Love simply and other poem (By Payal Pasha)

Inks (By Neha R. Krishna)

Khalaayen (By Aseem Ahmed Abbasee)

Think Poetry, Think Haiku (By Ashok Sawhny)

Lamhey

Oncemortal (By Nikhil Sharma)

Silent Flute (By Aparna Pathak)

Ehsaas (By Dr. Tina Gulzar)

== See also ==
- Delhi Poetry Festival
- Manipuri Sahitya Parishad
- Sahitya Akademi
