= Dhiraj Mishra =

- Occupations: Writer, film Director
- Known for: Jai Jawaan Jai Kisaan

Dhiraj Mishra is an Indian screenwriter, Director and playwright on movies such as Jai Jawaan Jai Kisaan.

== Career ==
Mishra worked as a freelance journalist for magazines and newspapers. He was the creative writer for various TV serials. He wrote a feature film screenplay based on the life of Indian prime minister Lal Bahadur Shastri titled Jai Jawaan Jai Kisaan. His upcoming movies are Birsa, about a freedom fighter from Jharkhand and Chapekar brothers, a revolutionary story about freedom fighters from Pune. Om Puri was to play Bal Gangadhar Tilak.

Mishra wrote a novel Patjhar aur Bahar. He wrote a play on the life of India's first woman prime minister Indira Gandhi titled Indira.

== Director ==
- Alingan
- Hero of Nation Chandra Shekhar Azad
- Lafzon Mein Pyaar

== Writer ==
- Jai Jawaan Jai Kisaan
- Chapekar Brothers (Movie)
- Main Khudiram Bose Hun
- Gaalib
- Deendayal Ek Yugpurush
- Hero of Nation Chandra Shekhar Azad
- Alingan
- Lafzon Mein Pyaar

== Awards ==
- Special Award As Writer for Jai Jawaan Jai Kisaan at International Film Festival of Prayag 2015.
