= Aryamaan – Brahmaand Ka Yodha =

Indian Television Series

- Also known as: Aryamaan
- Genre: Action; Science fiction Superhero
- Written by: Kamlesh Pandey; Brij Mohan Pandey
- Directed by: Dinker Jani
- Starring: Kiran Kumar; Mukesh Khanna; Shantipriya Manjeet Kullar
- Theme music composer: Pyarelal Ramprasad Sharma
- Composer: Pyarelal Ramprasad Sharma
- Country of origin: India
- Original language: Hindi
- No. of seasons: 1
- No. of episodes: 91

Production
- Producer: Mukesh Khanna
- Running time: 45 minutes
- Production company: Bheeshm International
- Budget: ₹15 crores

Original release
- Network: DD National
- Release: 14 July 2002

Aaryamaan - Brahmaand Ka Yoddha is an Indian superhero space opera television series that aired on DD National. It was produced under the banner of Bheeshm International by Mukesh Khanna. It held the record of the most expensive Indian television drama ever for a short period.

== Premise ==
The series follows the story of Aaryamaan (Mukesh Khanna), the warrior Prince of the human inhabited Thar Empire of the Aariyana galaxy, situated millions of light years away from Earth. Aaryamaan, son of Emperor Jarant and the Emperor's second wife Queen Rasa, is the rightful heir to the throne of the Thar Empire. When Aaryamaan was born, the drought-struck Aariyana experienced its first showers in many years. The distressed civilians looked up to the boy and believed that he is their saviour and will tide them over in all adverse situations.

However, Aaryamaan's step-mother and Emperor Jarant's first-wife queen Nasa gets extremely jealous of Rasa and Aaryamaan. She also gives birth to a mutated non-human child simultaneously when Rasa gives birth to Aaryamaan. A further jealous Nasa makes more than one attempt to kill the baby Aaryamaan. Queen Rasa realizes that as long as Aaryamaan lives with her in Thar, there is danger to his life. She instead instructs a helper robot called Tobo to take the child to planet Gurukshetra, where the 750-year-old Hoshin, a direct descendant of Aariyana would raise Aaryamaan. Hoshin trains Aaryamaan in fighting and other practices of a warrior. After learning all he has to learn from Hoshin, Aaryamaan receives a special armour suit, which can be opened from its showcase only by Aaryamaan's hand print. Aaryamaan first visits his Thar planet and finds out that Emperor Jarant has been overthrown by Nasa, appointing her half-human, half-beast son as a dummy king while making her the Royal Mother. Aaryamaan meets his parents, who have been imprisoned and chained to work in the mines of Thar. Unable to do anything at the moment, Aaryamaan sets out to various planets in search of a powerful weapon called Chandrahaas, to win back his lost kingdom. Along the way, has to confront his stepmother Queen Nasa, Shukrant, Mahasamant Naarak and other evil villains.

== Cast ==
- Kiran Kumar as Mahan Hoshin (Aaryamaan's guru)
- Mukesh Khanna as Prince Aaryamaan
- Shantipriya as Tejaswini 【Teji】
- Manjeet Kullar as Queen Nasa
- Deep Dhillon as King Durdan
- Reshma Modi as Queen Rasa
- Sudhir Mittu as King Jarant
- Deepak Jethi as Mahasamant Naarak
- Murli Sharma as Shukrant
- Shalini Arora as Paap Shakti Rakshindra
- Tarakesh Chauhan as King Son
- Brownie Parashar as Kurbak

== Background and production ==
Weapons similar to the lightsaber were used in the Aryamaan - Brahmaand Ka Yodha

According to Mukesh Khanna, unlike Shaktimaan, the drama had a wider appeal, targeting all sections of television viewers in India and its production values are ten times bigger than that of the Shaktimaan. He also described the show as the "Indian version of the famous Star Wars". The special effects were created by Crest Communications. The cost of production is said to be about Rs. 15 lakhs-Rs. 20 lakhs per episode. The team chose RK Studios for a month and Natraj Film Studio "to put up massive sets, including a spaceship with detailed interiors, including fake switchboards and consoles". The rest of the area was converted into a storage space for the costumes and props such as swords and lightsabers.

== Soundtrack ==
The title song is given by Pyarelal Ramprasad Sharma of the Laxmikant–Pyarelal. According to him, the opening theme contains a balanced fusion between Indian melody and Western music.

== Broadcast ==
The drama started on 14 July 2002 on DD National. In the summer of 2006 reruns of the series aired on Jetix.
