= Subhash Awchat =

Indian artist and author based in Mumbai

- Born: 1950 (age 75–76); Pune, Maharashtra, India
- Known for: Painter
- Movement: Contemporary

Subhash Awchat is an Indian artist and author based in Mumbai.

== Literary career ==
Awchat wrote the novel Madam in memory of Smita Patil, a collection of short stories, and a book of essays. His book Studio was collated from diaries that Awchat wrote over a period of 20 years. Studio is dedicated to Smita Patil and opens with a poem dedicated to Patil, who was a childhood friend of Awchat's. Awchat talks about the book: "Studio does not explicitly deal with my art, but the undercurrent of art is forever present. Here, in my own way, I have expressed my idea about art among other things. I have tried to explore the need for an artist to step out of the immediate urban microcosm, and into the rural India."

== Career as an artist ==
Awchat started off as a graphic designer but left the world of advertising to take up painting. Awchat intermittently worked on canvases from his Clown series from 1986 to 1991. Awchat's writing is an offshoot of his art in that each time he struggles with his artwork he returns to writing as a creative outlet.

Subhash Awachat acted in the award winning Marathi film 22 June 1897 (1979).

Awchat is working on a 20 by 60 feet (6.1 m × 18.3 m) commission. he is planning on moving to Alibaug, Maharashtra.
