= Imran Hasnee =

Indian actor (born 1972)

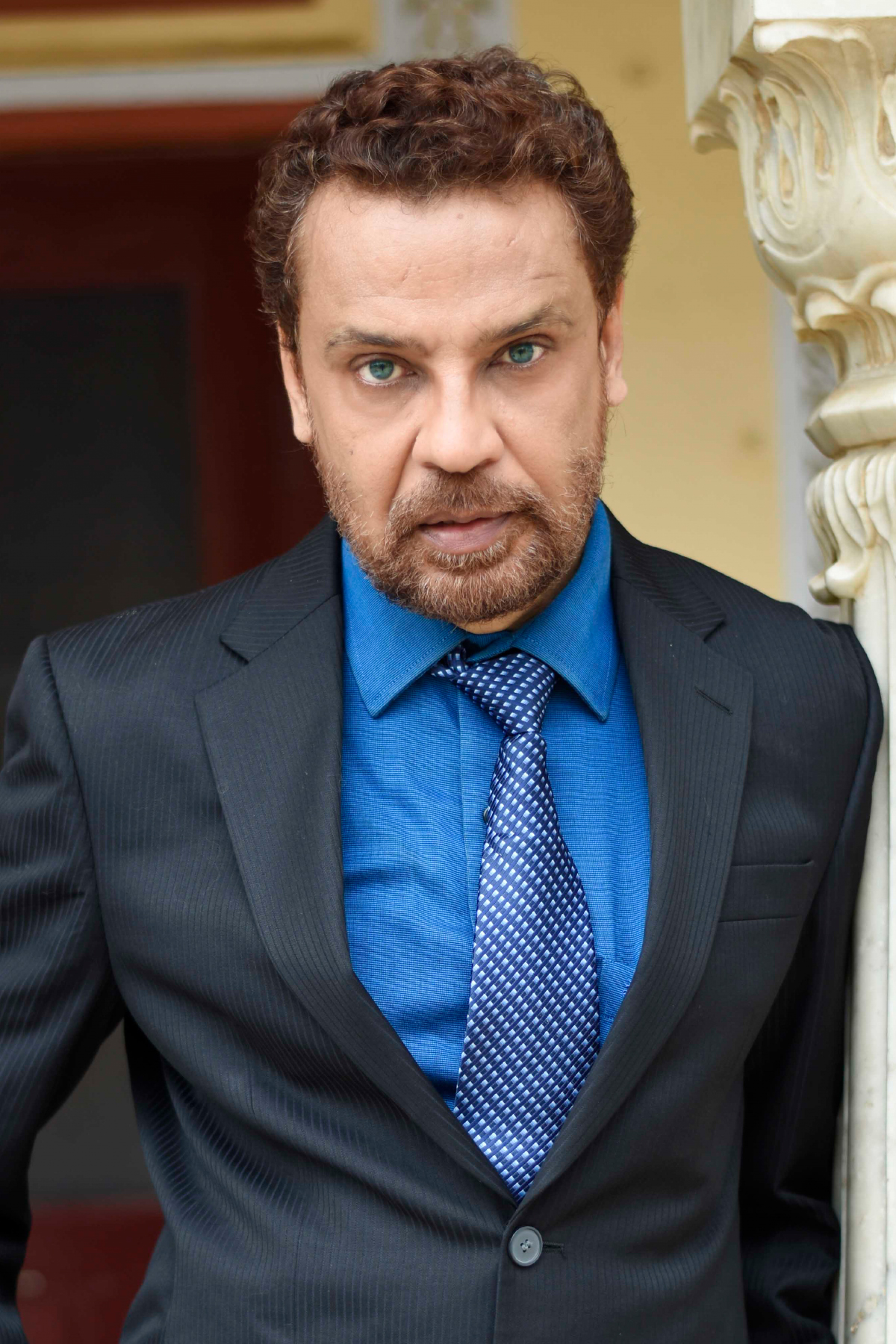
- Born: 1 December 1972 (age 53)
- Occupation: Actor
- Years active: 2006 – present

Imran Hasnee (born 1 December 1972) is an Indian actor. who has worked in the Indian cinema as well as British and American films. He is known for his work on the films A Mighty Heart, Slumdog Millionaire, and Paan Singh Tomar.

== Career ==
In Bollywood (Indian Film Industry) he worked in Paan Singh Tomar as the elder brother of Irrfan Khan, named Matadeen Singh Tomar (Dadda), directed by Tigmanshu Dhulia and produced by UTV Motion Pictures.

He later acted in D-Day, a Hindi feature film directed by Nikhil Advani. Hasnee played the character Saleem Pathan.

He also worked in the movie Jai Jawaan Jai Kisaan, a historical, based on Lal Bahadur Shastri. In this movie, he played the character of his teacher and mentor Shri Nishkameshwar Prasad Mishra, a freedom fighter, who taught Lal Bahadur the practical aspects of life, showing him the correct direction in life. Lal's life was greatly influenced by his teacher.

He has acted in the Hindi feature films: The Dirty Picture (playing the character of a film director Vijayan) and Once Upon a Time in Mumbaai (2010). Both films were directed by Milan Luthria and produced by Balaji Telefilms.

He has also acted in Indian television shows, the first show he did was directed by Ravi Rai, for Zee Tv, titled Kasshish.

His next serial was Risshton Ki Dor, airing on Sony TV in 2006 and directed by Gautam Adhikari; this serial was produced by SAB TV.

He played the main antagonist, Sridhar, in the Star TV serial Sapnon Se Bhare Naina, airing from 20 December 2010 to 3 February 2012.

== Filmography ==
Year	Project name	Character	Director
2007	A Mighty Heart	Journalist	Michael Winterbottom
2008	Slumdog Millionaire	Security	Danny Boyle
2010	Paan Singh Tomar	Matadeen (Dadda)	Tigmanshu Dhulia
2011	The Dirty Picture	Vijayan	Milan Luthria
2013	D-Day	Saleem Pathan	Nikhil Advani
2014	Ya Rab	Javed	Hasnain Hyderabadwala
2015	Welcome 2 Karachi	Pak Intelligence	Ashish R Mohan
2015	Jai Jawaan Jai Kisaan	Nishkameshwar	Milan Ajmera
2016	Main Khudiram Bose Hun	Amritlal	Bhanuprakash Jha
2018	Deendayal Ek Yugpurush	Deendayal Upadhyay	Manoj Giri
2019	PM Narendra Modi	Zafar	Omung Kumar
2020	Yaara	Pehelwan	Tigmanshu Dhulia
2020	Gul Makai	Asif Ali Zardari	Amjad Khan
2020	Main Khudiram Bose Hun	Amrutlal	Manoj Giri
2021	Kabaad: The Coin	Badshah Khan	Varadraj Swami
2021	System Update	Father	Rohit Chaudhary
2022	High Tide	Ashwani Kumar Budhel	Imran Hasnee
