= Anil Rastogi =

Indian actor

- Born: April 4, 1943 (age 83); Lucknow, Uttar Pradesh, India
- Occupations: Theatre, film and television actor, scientist
- Awards: Sangeet Natak Akademi Award (2023); Padma Shri (2026)

Anil Rastogi (born 4 April 1943) is an Indian theatre, television and film actor. He is known for his roles in Udaan, Ishaqzaade, Na Bole Tum Naa Maine Kuch Kaha and Hanuman Ansh

A former scientist of the Central Drug Research Institute (CDRI), Lucknow (1962-2003), he is a Fellow of National Academy of Sciences, India. He has over 1000 theatre performances. He received UP Sangeet Natak Academy Award in 1984, UP Sangeet Natak Academy Fellowship in 2007, Yash Bharti Award in 2016, Sangeet Natak Akademi Award in 2023, Padma Shri by the Government of India in 2025.

== Early life and education ==
He was born in Lucknow, Rastogi grew up in the Raja Bazaar area of Lucknow and completed his primary and secondary education in the city.Subsequently, he attended Lucknow University for graduate and post-graduate studies, with M.Sc. in Biochemistry, followed by a Ph.D. in Microbiology. Rastogi developed an interest in theatre during his school years after watching Dr. Ghanshyam Das perform. His maternal uncle, Tony Babu, a theatre actor introduced him to actors and directors and later while pursuing higher education, he acted in play Noor Jahan in 1961. In 1961, aged 18, Rastogi attended a public reception for Soviet cosmonaut Yuri Gagarin at the Central Drug Research Institute, Lucknow, where he subsequently joined as a scientist in the following year.

== Career ==
He joined CDRI in 1962 as Junior Research Fellow and retired from the Institute as Head of Biochemistry and Directors Grade Scientist in 2003. His doctorate degree is in microbiology. He has co-authored over 78 research publications in peer-reviewed journals.

He is Fellow of National Academy of Sciences, India. He started working in theatre in 1962 and has done more than 1000 shows of 98 plays in Hindi (original or adapted from different Indian or foreign languages) all over the country. He has been secretary/ general secretary of one of the oldest amateur theatre group of India Darpan for more than 46 years.

In 2026, Anil Rastogi was awarded the Padma Shri, India’s fourth-highest civilian honour, for his contribution to theatre, cinema and cultural arts.

Anil Rastogi did several plays across the nation. He worked with eminent theatre directors like late Rajeshwar Bachchan, late Ravi Baswani, late Raj Bisaria, late BV Karanth, late Bansi Kaul, Ajay Kartik, late Urmil Km Thapliyal, late Dina Nath, Ranjit Kapoor, Surya Mohan Kulshreshtha and others.

== Personal life ==
Rastogi lives in Lucknow with his wife, Sudha, a retired teacher from Nari Shiksha Niketan college, Lucknow, his son and daughter-in-law, Anurag and Lata, who run an IT company in Lucknow and a grandchild Lakshya, who is a student. He is also associated with NGO Hari Om Seva Kendra, founded by his brother, Chandra Kishore Rastogi, which provides assistance to hospital patients and their attendants in Lucknow.

=== Plays ===
(Around 1000 shows of 98 plays)

- Panchhi Jaa, Panchhi Aa (directed by Dina Nath) as Pawan (more than 400 shows all over the country)
- Rustam Sohrab as Rustam
- Taj Mahal Ka Tender as Shah Jahan
- Yahoodi Ki Ladki as Yahoodi
- A View from the Bridge as Eddi
- Fando and Lis as Fando
- Vibhaas (The Old World) as Protagonist Doctor (1999, 2025)
- Kanya Daan as Father
- Bare Foot in Athens as Lycon
- Harischannar Ki Ladai as Commissioner
- Kamla as Journalist friend
- Tum as Father of Protagonist
- Sakharam Binder as Sakharam
- Balram Ki Tirtha Yatra as Balram
- Mitra as Protagonist
- Lighter on the Lips as Mafia Don (2024)
- Akhri Vasant as Protagonist (2022)
- Swaha as Protagonist and many others (2023)
- Katha Shivpal Ganj Ki as Vaidji (2025)

=== Television ===
(More than 500 shows of various serials)

- Udaan (1989) as SSP Bashir Ahmed
- Biwi Naatiyon Wali
- Samvidhaan (2014) as Calcutta Member of Parliament, N. Ahmed
- Na Bole Tum Naa Maine Kuch Kaha (season 2) as Purushottam Singh Tilakdhari (2013)
- Razia Sultan (2015)
- Dariba Diaries (2014-2015) as Imam

OTTs

- Aashram (2020) Webseries as Sunder Lal (Season 1, 2, 3 and part 2 of Season 3)
- Shiksha Mandal (2022) Webseries as Umesh Mahajan
- Bindia as Judge (2023)
- Taali as Judge (2023)
- Rohtak Sisters as Father of Protagonist (2022)
- Viruddha as Politician (2024)
- Grahan as Important witness of '84 riots (2022)
- Raktanchal 2 as Politician uncle of Protagonist (2022)
- The Suitable Boy as Jeweller (2022)
- Bindiya Ke Bahubali as Judge (2026)

=== Films ===
(More than 70 films to date)

- " Ye Vo Manzil To Nahin " as a pro British Officer ( 1984 )
- " Mareechikaa " as Father of Protagonist ( 1988 )
- " Khoon Baha Ganga Men " as Thakur ( 1988)
- " Samarpan ( A short Film ) as Dacoit ) ( 1989 )
- " Sambandh ( A short film on environment, won National Award ) (1990 )
- Main, Meri Patni Aur Woh (2005)
- "Bikru Kanpur Gangster" as Mentor of Protagonist (2024)
- Ishaqzaade (2012) as Daddu (Parma's grandfather)
- Gaalib (2020) as Bashir Ahmad
- " Z+ (2017) as Chief Minister of Rajsthan
- Thapppad (2020) as Justice Jaisingh, Netra's father-in-law
- Guddu Rangeela (2015) as Minister
- Raid (2018) as Finance Minister
- Mulk (film) (2018) as Sonkar, Murad Ali's friends
- Nakkash (2019) as Politician
- Hotel Salvation(Mukti Bhawan) (2017) as Manager of Mukti Bhawan
- Raag Desh (2017) as Kailash Nath Katju
- Baraat Company (2017) as father of Protagonist
- Batla House (2019) as Shivraj Patil
- The Accidental Prime Minister (film) (2019) as Shivraj Patil
- Chintoo Ji (2009) as Pundit Jee
- Short film Aathwan (2017) in lead role of a Dementia patient
- Sitapur The City Of Gangster (2021)
- Ittu See Baat (2021)
- Bhavai (2021)
- Alingan (2022)
- " Lakeeren, The untold story " as Mentor of main Counsel " ( 2023 )
- " Deen Dayal Upadhyaay " as Uncle of Protagonist ( 2020 )
- " Seher " as Principal of a degree college ( 2022 )
- " Tauba Tera Jalwa " as Jailor ( 2023 )
- " Godaan " as Villain ( 2023 )
- " Acting Ka Bhoot " As father of protagonist ( 2023 )
- " Kataan " as Judge ( 2023 )
- " Rae Bareilley " As Politician ( 2023 )
- " Sub Way " as politician ( 2023 )
- " Love is Blind " Politician ( 2023 )
- ' " Mission Rani Ganj " as father of Miner ( 2024 )
- " Bengaal 1947 " as father of Protagonist ( 2024 )
- " Mahadeo Ka Gorakhpur " as a Retired IAS officer ( 2024 )
- Mohe Pyar Ke Rang Men Rang Sajna (2024), a Bhojpuri Film
- Dulhania Le Aayegi ( 2025 ) as Doctor friend of the father of protagonist
- Bolo Har Har Shambhoo ( 2025 ) A Kashmiri pundit who migrated first from Pakistan and then from Kashmir
- Hanuman Ansh as Mahant Ji (2026)

TV Commercials ( 24 )

- KBC Promo Yahan Paise Hi Nahin Dil Bhi Jeete Jate Hain (2015)
- Kala Hit Kone men Jhadu ke itne paise (2018–20)
- Hero Motor Bike( 2014)
- Symphoni Fan (2016)
- Gold Medal Electricals
- Finolex Pipes
- Shekhar Multi Speciality Hospital
- Ikon Steel

=== Main Awards (National and State Awards) ===
- Padma Shri Fourth highest civilian award of the country (2026)
- National Sangeet Natak Akademi Award Highest award of country in Acting (2023)
- Kalidas Samman, Highest Award in Theatre of Government of Madhya Pradesh
- Yash Bharti ( Highest Award of Uttar Pradesh Government (2017)
- UP Sangeet Natak Academy Fellow (2008)
- Fellow National Academy of Sciences, India (1999)
- UP sangeet Natak Academy Award (1984)
- DD UP Life Time Achievement Award ( 2024 )
- UP Urdu Academy Bharat Ratan Atal Urdu Samman ( 2024 )

=== Other Awards ===
- Pataliputra Life Time Achievement Award of Prangan Patna ( 2024 )
- " Canmass Life Time Achievement Award Paradeep ( 2024 )
- " Life Time Achievement Award of Society of Laryngologists of India ( 2024 )
- " Justice SC Verma Memorial Award 2024 by Kalaakaar Association ( 2024 )
- " Late Raju Srivastava Memorial Award by Awadhi Vikaas Sansthaan ( 2023 )
- " Life Time Achievement Award for Film Acting by Rashtriy Manav Adhikaar Suraksha Parishad ( 2023 )
- " Zindagi Award by News Time Nation ( 2023 )
- " Golden Personality of India Award by Sarthak welfare Society ( 2023 )
- " Bharat Gaurav Samman " by World Human Rights Council ( 2023 )
- " Bharatmuni Rang Bharty Samman " by Rang Bharty ( 2023 )
- " Award e Tiranga Samman " by Alliance and Social Cultural Society ( 2023 )
- " Udaan Lata Mangeshkar Samman " by Udaan Nritya Samiti ( 2023 )
- Kavishala Lifetime Achievement Award - 2025
