= Amma (TV series) =

Indian crime drama television series

- First look
- Genre: Crime; Thriller; Drama
- Created by: Farhn P Zamma
- Written by: Aloke Upadhyay
- Creative director: Farhn P Zamma
- Starring: See below
- Country of origin: India
- Original language: Hindi
- No. of seasons: 1
- No. of episodes: 52

Production
- Production locations: Mumbai, India
- Camera setup: Multi-camera
- Production company: Salt Media LLP

Original release
- Network: Zee TV
- Release: 25 June – 18 December 2016

Amma is an Indian crime drama television series that premiered on June 25, 2016, on Zee TV. It was created by Farhn P. Zamma. The show is based on the female underworld don of Mumbai, Jenabai Daruwali.

== Synopsis ==
The show explores the life of a female underworld figure through five decades. It adds the love story of Amma's daughter Rehanna and Faisal. Faisal is one of Amma's gangsters, The show follows them as they face trials and tribulations, so that Amma would accept them and they could marry. A small side love story describes Rehanna's sister Saraswati who loves Atul, her college friend. The show depicts Amma's reaction when she finds out about the romance.

== Cast ==
- Urvashi Sharma as Zeenat Sheikh
- Nasirr Khan as Abbas Sheikh
- Shabana Azmi as Old Zeenat Sheikh
- Aman Verma as Shekeran "Anna" Shetty (character based on Varadarajan Mudaliar)
- Neha chandra as "Laxmi Shetty" "Anna's wife"
- Nishigandha Wad as Lakshmi Shetty
- Ashmit Patel as Faisal Qureshi
- Yuvika Chaudhary as Rehana Sheikh
- Nawab Shah as Haider Ali Qazi (character based on Haji Mastan)
- Ziya Siddique as Saraswati Shetty
- Zakir Hussain as Police Commissioner K. N. Dayal
- Meghna Naidu as Hanaan
- Raju Kher as Faakir
- Ajaz Khan as Azhar Yeda
- Syed Ashraf Karim as Naeem Qureshi
- Jeetu Verma as Inspector P. K. Prajapati
- Sikandar Kharbanda as ACP Atul Sahay
- Shawar Ali as Parvez Khan
- Deepraj Rana as Kabeer Lal (character based on Karim Lala)
- Sonal Parihar as Ghazzala
- Rahul Verma Rajput
- Shashi Kiran
- Jitendra Bohara as Tariq Qureshi brother of Faisal Qureshi
- Kanchan Awasthi as Sarla
