= Main Khudiram Bose Hun =

2017 Indian Hindi-language biopic film

Main Khudiram Bose Hoon
- Theatrical release poster
- Directed by: Manoj Giri
- Screenplay by: Dhiraj Mishra
- Produced by: Ashok Sahni
- Starring: Rituparna Sengupta; Sushant Sahni; Kanishk Kumar Jain; Imran Hasnee
- Cinematography: S. Kumar Bhagat
- Music by: Bapi Tutul
- Production company: Ashok Sahni Films
- Release date: 11 August 2017
- Country: India
- Language: Hindi

Main Khudiram Bose Hun (transl. I'm Khudiram Bose) is 2017 Indian Hindi-language biographical film about Indian revolutionary leader Khudiram Bose from West Bengal. Young theatre artiste, Kanishk Kumar Jain to play Bengal teenage rebel, Khudiram Bose.

== Synopsis ==
Main Khudiram Bose Hoon is a film about Mednipur born Khudiram Bose who was hanged at the age of 18. Khudiram, a teenage student became a martyr by walking on the path of revolution. This freedom fighter would plant bombs near police stations and attack government officials. Eventually, he was arrested on the charges of conducting a series of bomb attacks. The specific bombing for which he was sentenced to death resulted in the deaths of 3 persons.

== Cast ==
- Kanishk Kumar Jain as Khudiram Bose
- Sushant Sahni as Prafulla Chaki
- Rituparna Sengupta as Aprupa Devi (Sister of Khudiram).
- Imran Hasnee as Amrutlal
- Balendra Singh Balu as Hemchandra Kanungo
- Rajan Gour as Satyendra Nath Bose
- Ajit Khare as Lalit (Aprupa's son)
- Kanchan Awasthi as Nanibala
- Roopa Ganguly as Sarojini
- Akhilesh Jain as Advovate
- Azhan Hashmi as Rafeeq
- Megha Joshi as Rafeeq's Wife
- Amitabh Shukla as Sarojini's Son
- Vijay Jorha as Arvindo Ghosh
- Charles Thomson as Collector Woodman
- Vishal Dubey as Upendranath
- Mayank Pandey as Kalichanran
- Virendra Mishra as Varindra Ghosh
- R. Bhakti Klein as Kingsford
