= Jatin Khurana =

Indian actor

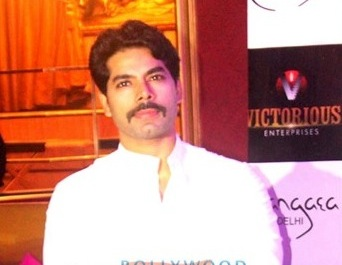
- Born: 6 October 1984 (age 41); Delhi, India
- Occupations: Film actor, producer

Jatin Khurana (born 6 October 1984) is a film actor and producer.

== Education ==
Jatin Khurana did his schooling from Delhi's Bharti Public School (Swasthya Vihar) and college from Delhi University. He also did his acting course from legendary acting guru Kishore Namit Kapoor in Mumbai.

== Film career ==
Jatin Khurana hails from Delhi and has been a part of several theatre groups there. Later, he moved to Mumbai and secured the lead role in a film called Ye Stupid Pyaar. The movie Ye Stupid Pyaar released in the year 2011. He also worked as an assistant director in movies like Love Ke Chakkar Mein and Zindagi Khoobsoorat Hai. Jatin played the character of Chandrashekhar Azad in the movie Jai Jawaan Jai Kisaan.

Actor

Year	Film	Role	Other notes
2011	Ye Stupid Pyaar	Abhishek Khurana	Released
2015	Jai Jawaan Jai Kisaan	Chandrashekhar Azad	Released
2024	Tauba Tera Jalwa	Romy Tyagi	Released

== Award ==
- Special Award at International Film Festival of Prayag 2015 For Playing The role of Chandrashekhar Azad .
