= Ashok Sawhny =

Indian poet and businessman

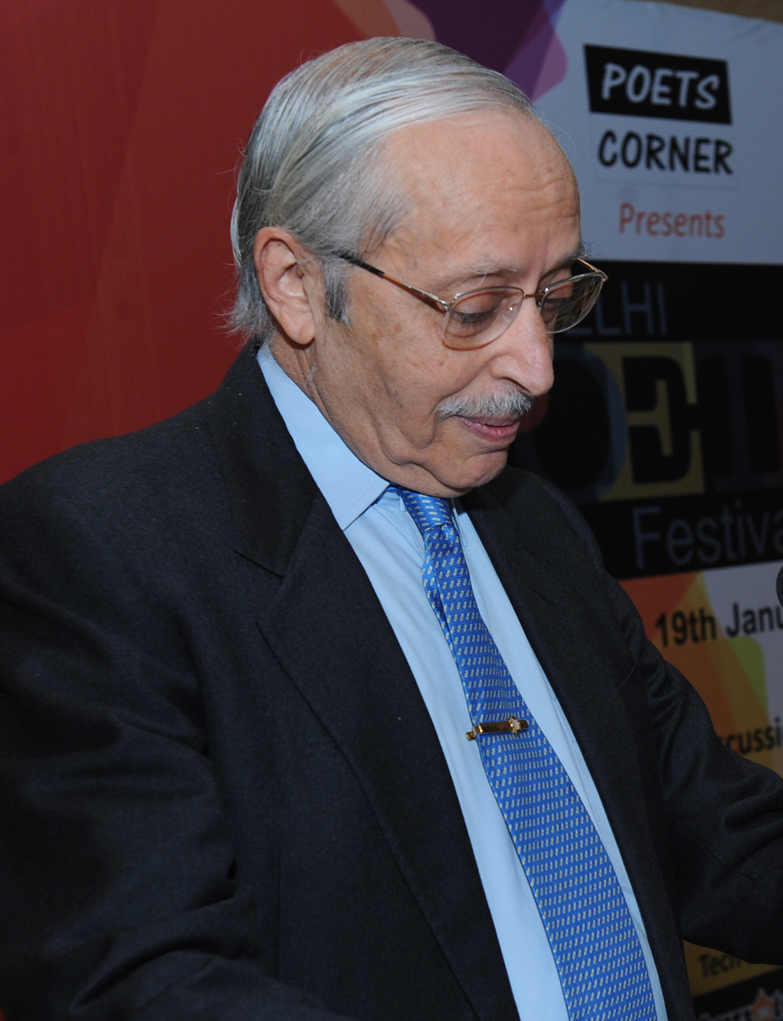
- Sawhny at the 2013 Delhi Poetry Festival
- Born: 6 December 1937 (age 88); Lahore, now in Pakistan
- Education: St. Stephen's College, Delhi
- Occupations: Poet, businessman, film producer
- Writing career
- Genre: Poetry
- Website: ashoksawhny.com

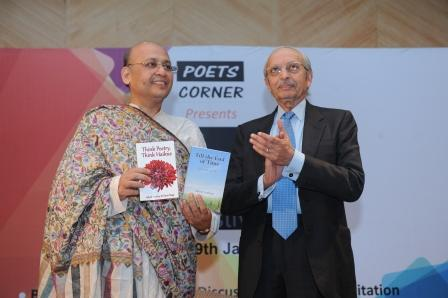
Sawhny with Indian politician Abhishek Singhvi

Ashok Sawhny (born 1937) is bilingual Indian poet, film producer and businessman. He is founder and President of Monarch International (established 1978), an international trading company with offices in several countries.

== Early life ==
Sawhny was born in the year 1937 in Lahore, Pakistan. He attended Modern School, New Delhi followed by St. Stephen's College, Delhi

== Career ==
Sawhny worked with Indian Industry till 1977, before starting with his own company, Monarch International in 1978. trading internationally with offices in several countries. He has also critically acclaimed film, Listen Amaya (2013), starring Farooq Shaikh and Deepti Naval.

Ashok sawhney has penned 13 solo poetry books so far. He has been published in anthologies alongside A. P. J. Abdul Kalam, Gulzar, Ruskin Bond, Deepti Naval, Shashi Tharoor, Irshad Kamil, and Kapil Sibal.

== Bibliography ==
- The Sands of Time and Other Poems ISBN 978-1-84748-493-2
- As Time Goes By: And Other Poems ISBN 978-1-84748-538-0
- Chequerboard and Other Poems ISBN 978-1-84748-637-0
- Fruit Salad: Poems for Children ISBN 978-1-84748-620-2
- To Have Loved ISBN 978-1-84748-725-4
- The Tyranny of Truth and Other Poems ISBN 978-1-84748-795-7
- The Mango Grove at Kashipur ISBN 978-1-84748-848-0
- Think Poetry, Think Haikus ISBN 978-1-78035-466-8
- 11 Short Stories ISBN 978-1-78035-514-6
- Till the End of Time and Other Poems ISBN 978-1-78035-314-2
