= Hero of Nation Chandra Shekhar Azad =

- Directed by: Dhiraj Mishra and Raja Randeep Giri
- Written by: Yashomati Devi and Dhiraj Mishra
- Produced by: Jasbir Singh, Anurada Gurpur and Tarannum
- Starring: Ahmad Kabir Shadan, Riitu Sood, Raza Murad and Zarina Wahab
- Cinematography: Eugene D'souza
- Edited by: Manoj Sankala
- Music by: Arun Dev Yadav
- Production company: Bloomfair Production
- Release date: 25 March 2022
- Country: India
- Language: Hindi

Hero of Nation Chandra Shekhar Azad is a 2022 Hindi film starring Ahmad Kabir Shadan, Riitu Sood, Raza Murad, and Zarina Wahab.

== Plot ==
The film is based on Chandra Shekhar Azad's life. The film will introduce us to Azad's life like his family ties union with freedom fighters as well as the personality.

== Cast ==
- Ahmad Kabir Shadan as Chandra Shekhar Azad
- Riitu Sood as Durga Bhabhi
- Raza Murad as Sitaram Tiwari father of Azad
- Zarina Wahab as Jagraani Devi mother of Azad
- Puneet Agarwal as Vishwanath
- Kavita Thakur as Rudranarayan wife
