= Chapekar brothers =

Indian revolutionaries who assassinated a British official in Pune (1897)

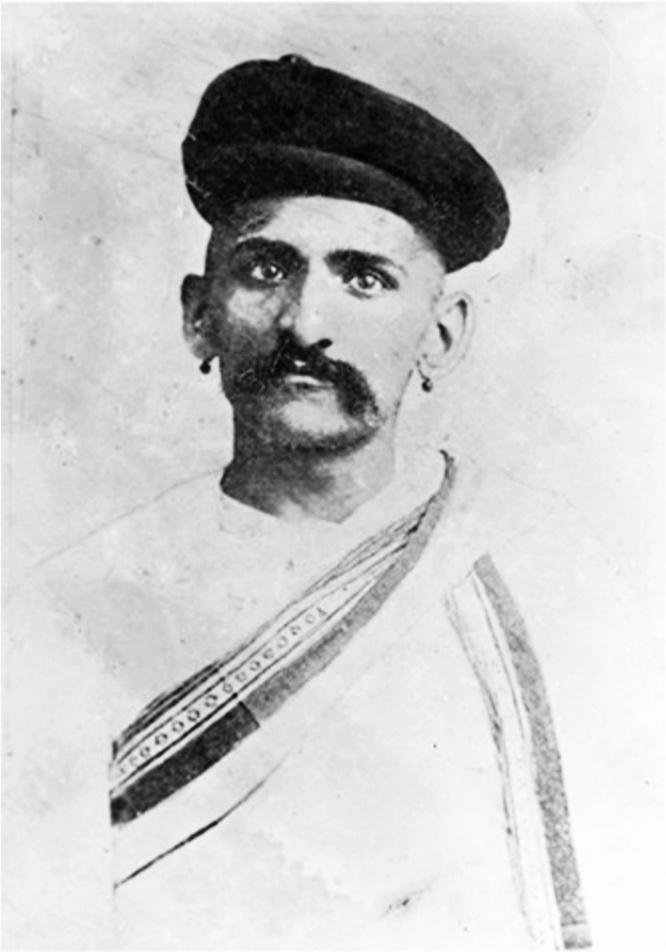
Damodar Hari Chapekar

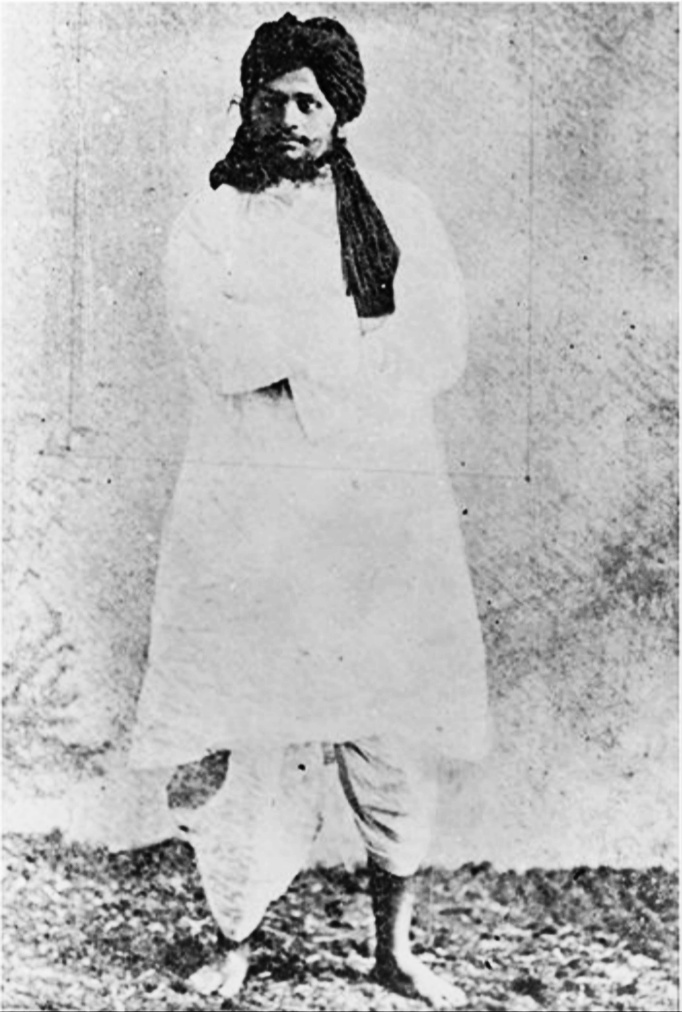
Balkrishna Chapekar

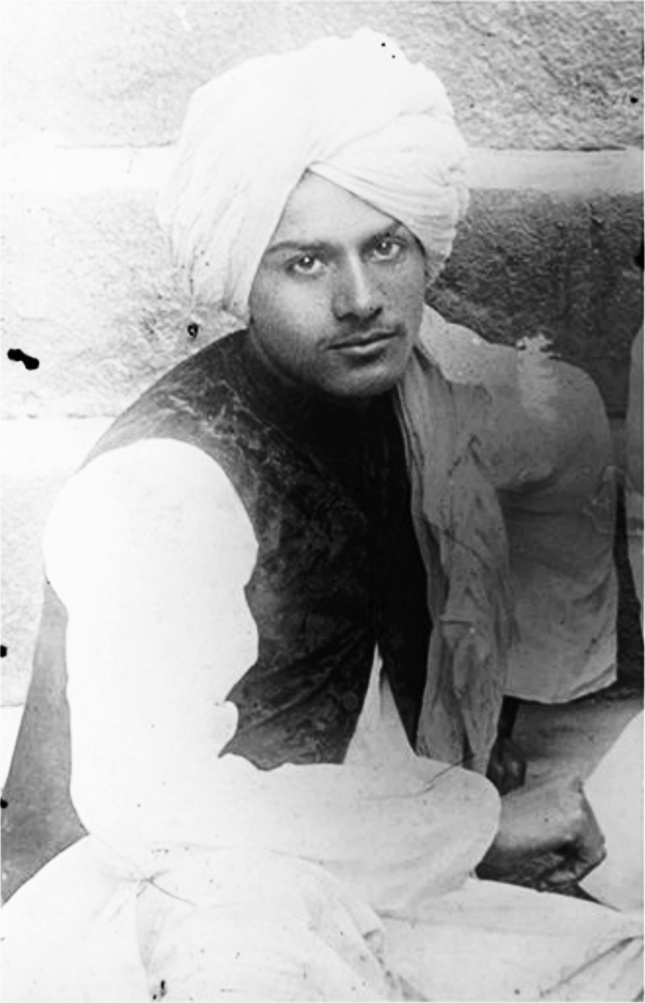
Vasudeo Chapekar

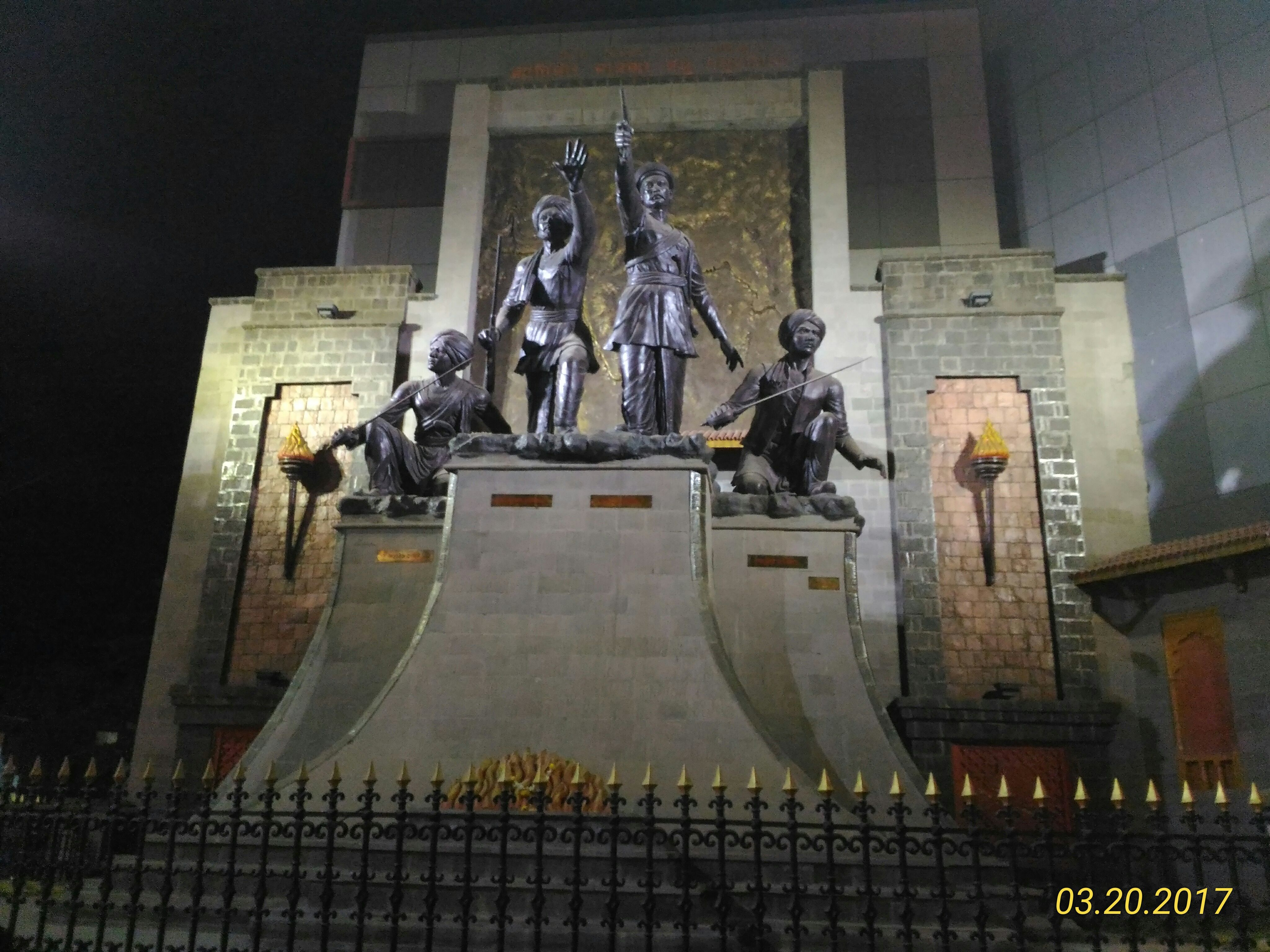
Statue of the Chapekar brothers at Chinchwad, Pune

The Chapekar Brothers — Damodar Hari Chapekar (25 June 1869 – 18 April 1898), Balkrishna Hari Chapekar (1873 – 12 May 1899, also called Bapurao) and Vasudeo Hari Chapekar (1880 – 8 May 1899, also spelt Wasudeva or Wasudev), were Indian revolutionaries involved in assassinating W. C. Rand, the British Plague Commissioner of Poona, after the public of Poona were frustrated with the actions of officers and soldiers appointed by him. Mahadev Vinayak Ranade was also an accomplice in the assassination.

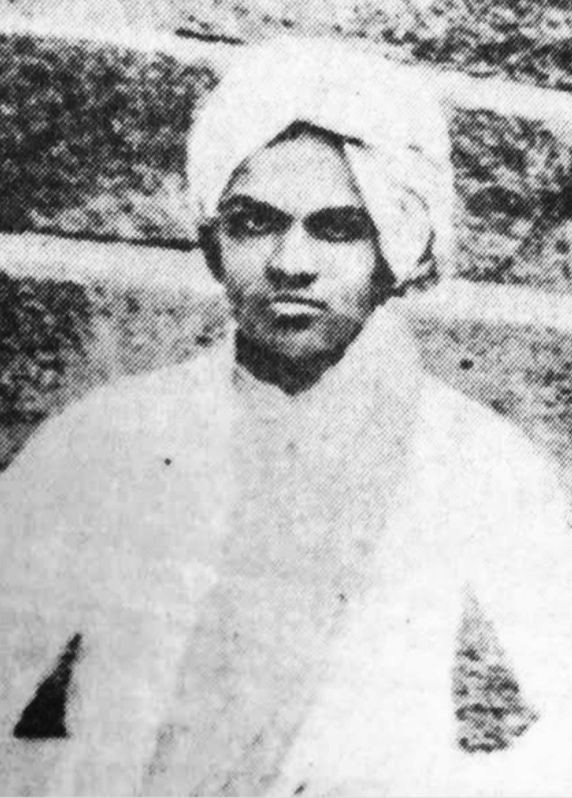
Mahadev Ranade

The Chapekar brothers came from Chapa, a small hamlet in the city of Poona, British India. When the bubonic plague hit India in 1896–97, the government had set up a Special Plague Committee for managing the pandemic, with Walter Charles Rand, an Indian Civil Services officer, as its Commissioner. Over 800 soldiers were brought in to deal with the emergency. Despite orders from the government to pay heed to religious sentiments, the measures employed included entry into private houses, stripping and examination of occupants (including women) by British officers in public, evacuation to hospitals and segregation camps and preventing movement from the city. Some of these officers also vandalised properties and religious symbols. These measures were considered oppressive by the populace of Poona but their complaints were ignored by Rand. Thus, the Chapekar brothers shot Rand and his military escort, Lieutenant Ayerst, on 22 June 1897, the Diamond Jubilee of Queen Victoria, as the British officials were returning from the celebrations at Government House. Ayerst died on the spot and Rand of his wounds on 3 July.

The Chapekar brothers and two accomplices (Mahadev Vinayak Ranade and Khando Vishnu Sathe [First-name not known]) were charged with the murders in various roles, as well as the shooting of two informants and an attempt to shoot a police officer. All three brothers were found guilty and hanged, an accomplice was dealt with similarly, and another, then a schoolboy, was sentenced to ten years' rigorous imprisonment.

== The 1897 Bubonic plague in Pune ==
Pune, was a very important military base with a large cantonment during the British colonial rule. The cantonment had a significant European population of soldiers, officers, and their families. A number of public health initiatives were undertaken during this period ostensibly to protect the Indian population, but mainly to keep Europeans safe from the periodic epidemics of diseases like Cholera, bubonic plague, small pox, etc. The action took form in vaccinating the population and better sanitary arrangements. Given the vast cultural differences, and at times the arrogance of colonial officers, these health measures often led to public anger. However, the heavy handedness particularly bad in 1897, during the bubonic plague epidemic in the city. By the end of February 1897, the epidemic was raging with a mortality rate twice the norm (657 deaths or 0.6% of the city population), and half the city's population had fled. A Special Plague Committee was formed under the chairmanship of W.C. Rand, an Indian Civil Services officer. He brought European troops to deal with the emergency. The heavy handed measures he employed included forcibly entering peoples' homes, at times in the middle of the night and removing infected people and digging up floors, where it was believed in those days, the plague bacillus bacteria resided. It was also required of the principal occupant of a house or a building to report all deaths and all illnesses suspected to be plague. Funerals were declared unlawful until the deaths were registered. The committee had the right to mark special grounds for giving funeral to corpses suspected to have succumbed from plague, and prohibit use of any other place for the purpose. Disobedience of the orders would subject the offender to criminal prosecution. The work of the committee began on 13 March and ended on 19 May. The total estimated plague mortality was 2091. These measures were deeply unpopular. Nationalist leader Bal Gangadhar Tilak fulminated against the measures in his newspapers, Kesari and Maratha. The resentment culminated in Rand and his military escort being shot dead by the Chapekar brothers on 22 June 1897.The assassination led to a re-evaluation of public health policies. This led even Tilak to support the vaccination efforts later in 1906.

=== Diverging opinions of the British measures ===
In his report on the administration of the Puna plague, Rand wrote, "It is a matter of great satisfaction to the members of the Plague Committee that no credible complaint that the modesty of a woman had been intentionally insulted was made either to themselves or to the officers under whom the troops worked". He also writes that closest watch was kept on the troops employed on plague duty and utmost consideration was shown for the customs and traditions of the people. A missionary, Rev. Robert P. Wilder, quoted in a contemporary New York Times article, asserted that the cause of plague was native practices such as going bare-foot, the distrust of the natives about the government segregation camps; further, that houses have been shut up with corpses inside, and search parties have been going around to unearth them. The same article included reported rumours that the plague has been caused by grain hoarded for twenty years by the banias or grocers being sold in the market, while others felt it was Queen Victoria's curse for the daubing of her statue with tar.

In contrast to the above accounts, accounts based on local sources quote, among others, Narasimha Chintaman Kelkar as stating that the appointment of military officers introduced an element of severity and coercion in the house searches, the highhandedness of the government provoked the people of Puna, and some soldiers were beaten in the Rasta Peth locality. Kelkar alleged that the soldiers involved in the house searches "either, through ignorance or impudence, would mock, indulge in monkey tricks, talk foolishly, intimidate, touch innocent people, shove them, enter any place without justification, pocket valuable items, etc". His close associate, Bal Gangadhar Tilak, wrote: "Her Majesty the Queen, the Secretary of State and his Council, should not have issued the orders for practising tyranny upon the people of India without any special advantage to be gained... the government should not have entrusted the execution of this order to a suspicious, sullen and tyrannical officer like Rand."

Gopal Krishna Gokhale alleged in an interview with the Manchester Guardian, while on a visit to Britain, that soldiers "ignorant of the language and contemptuous of the customs, the sentiments and the religious susceptibilities of the [Indian] people" had been "let loose" upon the city of Poona, and had "wantonly destroyed property, appropriated jewellery, burnt furniture, entered kitchens and places of worship, contaminated food, spat upon idols or broke them by throwing them on the ground, and dragged women into the streets for inspection before removal to hospitals" during house searches. Gokhale further alleged during the interview that his associated reported to him that two women were sexually assaulted by soldiers, one of whom subsequently committed suicide. Gokhale subsequently came under a storm of criticism for his claims, and eventually offered an "unqualified apology" for them, for which he came under further criticism from Indian nationalists.

== The shooting of Rand ==
On 22 June 1897, the Diamond Jubilee of Queen Victoria was celebrated in Pune. In his autobiography, Damodar Hari writes that he believed the jubilee celebrations would cause Europeans of all ranks to go to the Government House, and give them the opportunity to kill Walter Charles Rand. The brothers Damodar Hari and Balkrishna Hari selected a spot of Ganeshkhind road, by side of a yellow bungalow to shoot at Rand. Each armed with a sword and a pistol. Balkrishna in addition carried a hatchet. They reached Ganeshkhind, they saw what looked like Rand's carriage pass by, but they let it go, not being sure, deciding to attack him on his way back. They reached Government House at 7.00 – 7.30 in the evening, the sun had set and darkness began to set in. A large number of people had gathered to witness the spectacle at the Government House. There were bonfires on the hills. The swords and the hatchets they carried made movement without raising suspicion difficult, so they cached them at a stone culvert near the bungalow. As planned, Damodar Hari waited at the gate of the Government House, and as Rand's carriage emerged, ran 10 – 15 paces behind it. As the carriage reached the yellow bungalow, Damodar made up the distance, and called out "Gondya ala re"(“Gondya has come,” or “here is Gondya”), a predetermined signal for Balkrishna to take action. Damodar Hari undid the flap of the carriage, raised it and fired from a distance of about a span. It was originally planned that both would shoot at Rand, so as to ensure that Rand would not live, however Balkrishna Hari lagged behind and Rand's carriage rolled on, Balkrishna Hari meanwhile on the suspicion that the occupants of the following carriage were whispering to each other, fired at the head of one of them from behind. Lieutenant Ayerst, Rand's military escort who was riding in the following carriage died on the spot, Rand was taken to Sassoon Hospital where he succumbed to his injuries on 3 July 1897.

Damodar Hari was arrested in connection with the above, on the basis of information given by the Dravid brothers. In his statement, recorded on 8 October 1897, Damodar Hari, said that atrocities like the pollution of sacred places and the breaking of idols were committed by European soldiers at the time of house searches in Pune, during the plague. Chapekar tells that they wanted to "take revenge" of this. His statement was treated as a confession and he was charged under section 302 of the Indian Penal Code, tried and hanged, on 18 April 1898. Balkrishna Hari absconded, and was found in January 1899, betrayed by a friend. The Dravid brothers were eliminated by Vasudeo Hari, Mahadev Vinayak Ranade and Khando Vishnu Sathe, who were arrested in their attempt to shoot police chief constable Rama Pandu later the same evening, of 9 February 1899.

All were subsequently apprehended and tried; Balkrishna Hari pleaded not guilty and his defense lawyers included S. S. Setlur. The Chapekar brothers Balkrishna Hari and Vasudeo Hari, along with Ranade, were convicted on March 8, 1899 and sentenced to death by hanging. Vasudev Hari was hanged on 8 May 1899, Mahadeva Vinayak Ranade on 10 May, and Balkrishna Hari on 12 May. Sathe, though a juvenile, was sentenced to 10 years' Rigorous Imprisonment.

== Coverage of the incident by international press ==
An article, published in The New York Times, dated 4 October 1897, reports the arrest of Damodar Chapekar Deccani, and 28 others, Ayerst's and Rand's slayers. This article states that Deccani is Damodar's last name and refers to him as such. It also terms him an advocate. Another dated 4 November 1897, reports the incident and the subsequent trial, it calls Damodar Chapekar a Brahmin lawyer. The former article says that Damodar became embittered with Europeans as he was refused enlistment in the army, by the authorities in Shimla. Both articles also mention Damodar's admission of an earlier incident of tarring of Queen Victoria's statue. On 2 February 1898, The New York Times reported the death sentence passed on Damodar. The Sydney Morning Herald, dated 13 February 1899, reports that a brother of Damodar Hari, who was sentenced to death for the killing of Rand and Ayerst, fired upon a native police officer. A connection between the shooting of the Dravid brothers on the streets of Poona is also mentioned with the shooting. It further states that Chapekar boasted of murder the Dravids and also named an accomplice, Ranade. It also reports the arrest of Chapekar and Ranade.

== In popular culture ==
The 1979 Indian Marathi-language film, 22 June 1897, covers events prior to the assassination, the act and its aftermath. The Hindi film Chapekar Brothers was released in 2016 and covered the same events.

An Indian web television series about the brothers in Marathi, Gondya Ala Re, was released in 2019 on Zee5.

In 2023, the story of the Chapekar brothers was shown in episode 43 of DD National's TV series Swaraj.
