= Alingan =

- Directed by: Dhiraj Mishra
- Written by: Yashomati Devi and Dhiraj Mishra
- Produced by: Grand National Movies
- Starring: Tushar Purwar, Vivek Anand Mishra, Anil Rastogi
- Cinematography: Eugene D'souza
- Edited by: Prakash Jha
- Release date: 25 March 2022
- Country: India
- Language: Hindi

Alingan is a Hindi film starring Tushar Purwar, Anil Rastogi, Vivek Anand Mishra and Prashant Rai in lead roles. Film has been shot at Varanasi, Prayagraj and Bhadrawah in Jammu. It was released on 25 March 2022.

== Plot ==
Alingan is a story of a 21-year-old boy Kabir whose father is a rich business man and mother is a housewife. His father doesn't treat his mother well. His father sends him to Shimla for higher studies so that he doesn't remain uneducated like his mother. When he returns after completing his studies, he had a tiff with his father. He decides to leave everything behind and embarks on a journey to find his identity. Kabir met different people with different difficulties. During this time he realizes that if he attains salvation, then he will be free from all the hassles of the world.

== Cast ==
- Tushar Purwar as Kabir
- Anil Rastogi
- Vivek Anand Mishra
- Prashant Rai
- Hiral Acharya
- Zoya Khan
- Akhilesh Jain
- Pritti Cheshta
- Rahul Rajput
