= New India (newspaper) =

Daily newspaper focused on Indian freedom published in colonial India

- Type: Daily newspaper
- Format: Broadsheet
- Founder: Annie Besant
- Founded: 1 June 1914; 112 years ago
- Ceased publication: 1947
- Political alignment: Pro Indian freedom struggle
- Language: English
- Headquarters: Adyar, Madras (now Chennai)
- Country: Colonial India

New India was an early 20th century daily newspaper published in India by Annie Besant, to highlight issues related to the Indian freedom struggle.

== Overview ==
New India was a newspaper founded as a means to spread news related to the Indian freedom struggle, and as a means to vocalize the views of its founder, the freedom fighter Dr. Annie Besant, through her editorials. It was in the same league as Gandhi's Harijan and Tilak's Kesari.

== Activities and political stance ==
New India was a pro Indian freedom newspaper, which simultaneously worked as a mouthpiece for the views of its founder Dr. Annie Besant. During and after the First World War, the return to Gandhi to India, the involvement of Indian masses in the Indian freedom struggle (which until then had generally remained a topic of discussion only for the English speaking upper class Indians) and the vociferous involvement of Bipin Chandra Pal, Bal Gangadhar Tilak, Lala Lajpat Rai, Gopal Krishna Gokhale, Motilal Nehru, Jawaharlal Nehru and others, the Indian freedom struggle began to gather momentum in places other than Delhi, Calcutta and Bombay. In 1914, Besant vocalized the idea of the inclusion of more Indians in making decisions related to India at a political and economic level. She called this freedom 'Home Rule', similar to the home rule movement in Ireland. Regular columnists in New India's first decade included S. S. Setlur.
