= Jai Jawan Jai Kisan =

Slogan given to India

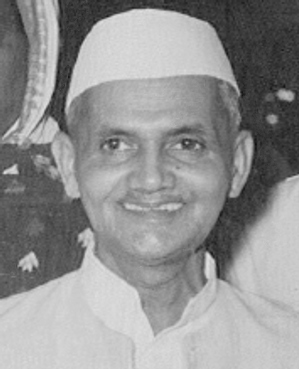
Lal Bahadur Shastri

Jai Jawan Jai Kisan (English: "Hail the Soldier, Hail the Farmer") was a slogan of Lal Bahadur Shastri, the second Prime Minister of India spoken in 1965 at a public gathering in Uruwa, Prayagraj.

Soon after Shastri took over the prime ministership of India after Nehru's death, India was attacked by Pakistan. At the same time, there was a scarcity of food grains in the country. Shastri gave the slogan Jai Jawan Jai Kisan to enthuse the soldiers to defend India and simultaneously cheering farmers to do their best to increase the production of food grains to reduce dependence on imports. It became a very popular slogan.

The I&B Ministry commemorated Shastri on his 48th martyr's day:

Former Prime Minister Lal Bahadur Shastri was one of those great Indians who has left an indelible impression on our collective life. Shri Lal Bahadur Shastri's contributions to our public life were unique in that they were made in the closest proximity to the life of the common man in India. Shri Lal Bahadur Shastri was looked upon by Indians as one of their own, one who shared their ideas, hopes, and aspirations. His achievements were looked upon not as the isolated achievements of an individual but of our society collectively. Under his leadership, India faced and repulsed the Pakistani invasion of 1965. It is not only a matter of pride for the Indian Army but also every citizen of the country. Shri Lal Bahadur Shastri's slogan Jai Jawan Jai Kisan reverberates even today through the length and breadth of the country. Underlying this is the inner-most sentiments 'Jai Hindustan'. The war of 1965 was fought and won for our self-respect and our national prestige. For using our Defence Forces with such admirable skill, the nation remains beholden to Shri Lal Bahadur Shastri. He will be remembered for all times to come for his large-heartedness and public service.

== Variants ==
Jai Jawan, Jai Kisan, Jai Vigyan (by Atal Bihari Vajpayee, Prime Minister)

After the Pokhran tests in 1998, Atal Bihari Vajpayee added Jai Vigyan (Hail Science) to the slogan to underline the importance of knowledge in India's progress.

Jai Jawan, Jai Kisan, Jai Vigyan, Jai Anusandhan (by Narendra Modi, Prime Minister)

PM Modi speaking on "Future India: Science and Technology" at the 106th Indian Science Congress at Lovely Professional University, Jalandhar, added Jai Anusandhan "hail the research" to the famous slogan of Jai Jawan, Jai Kisan and Atal Bihari Vajpayee's Jai Vigyan to emphasise the importance of research work for the national development.

Jai Jawan, Jai Kisan, Jai Vigyan, Jai Vidwan (by Dr. K.C. Mishra, Director, LBSIM New Delhi)

During the acceptance speech of Sunil Bharti Mittal delivered at Teen Murti Bhavan on 15 December 2009 after receiving the 10th Lal Bahadur Shastri National Award from the President of India, the Director of the Lal Bahadur Shastri Institute of Management, Delhi, Dr. Kailash Chandra Mishra. Jai Vidwan means "hail the learned"

Na Jawan Na Kisan

With reference to the 2021 Union Budget and the original quote by Shashtri, Shashi Tharoor used the phrase "Na Jawan Na Kisan" (which literally translates to "No soldier, no farmer") in the parliament.

== In popular culture ==
In 2015, a film based on Shastri's life was released which was named after this slogan.

== See also ==
- Jai Jawan Jai Kisan Mazdoor Congress
- Jai Jawan, 1970 Indian film
- Jai Jawan Jai Makan, 1971 Indian film
