= Walter Charles Rand =

Indian Civil Service officer (1863–1897)

- Born: 12 May 1863; Halton, Suffolk, United Kingdom
- Died: 3 July 1897 (aged 34); Pune, British India
- Cause of death: Assassination
- Occupation: Indian Civil Service
- Spouse: Ethel Mary Moens (m. 1893)
- Parents: John Rand (father); Fanny Hicks (mother)

Walter Charles Rand (12 May 1863 – 3 July 1897) was an Indian Civil Service officer in British India.

An epidemic of bubonic plague spread in Pune in 1896. On 19 February 1897, Rand was appointed as plague commissioner of the city. The British, in general and Rand, in particular, were keen to eradicate the plague as quickly as possible as it adversely affected the commercial interests of the British. Rand misused his post and looted innocent Indians and humiliated women." Rand's efforts to control plague were tyrannical and brutal and reminded by many in Pune including Lokmanya Bal Gangadhar Tilak.

Rand and his military escort Lt. Charles Egerton Ayerst were shot by Chapekar brothers on 22 June 1897. Ayerst died on the spot, while Rand died of his injuries on 3 July.

Prior to being posted at Pune, Rand was posted as assistant collector of Satara.

His assassination rapidly became a part of the Indian national movement, especially in Bombay Presidency.
