= Kanchan Awasthi =

Indian model and actress

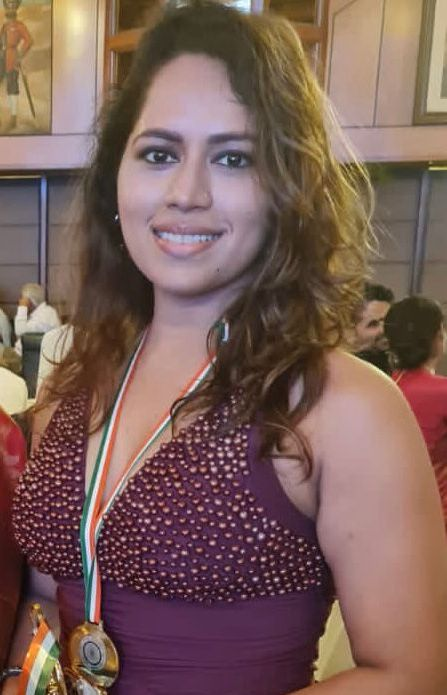
- Kanchan Awasthi in 2022
- Born: Lucknow, Uttar Pradesh, India
- Occupation(s): Model, actress
- Website: kanchanawasthi.com

Kanchan Awasthi is an Indian model and actress. She has appeared in the Indian television show Amma and Hindi movies including, Manto Remix, Bhootwali Love Story Gunwali Dulhaniya, and Fraud Saiyaan.

She is appointed brand ambessdor for Avon cycles.

== Movies ==
Year(s)	Title	Character
2022	Love Hackres	Shamli Yadav
2021	Manto Rimix	Kulwant Kaur
2021	Kutubminar	Bhulki
2019	Gunwali Dulhaniya	Sharmili Roy
2019	Fraud Saiyyan	Namita
2018	Bhootwali Love Story	Madhubala (ghost)
2018	Main Khudiram Bose Hun	Nanibala
2013	Ankur Arora Murder Case	Dr. Hiya Shah

== Web series ==
Year(s)	Title	Platform	Character
2023	Hasee to Phasee	Amazon mini tv	Anjali
2023	Laal batti	Voot	Mohini
2023	Majnu Salon	Netflix	Mona
2023	Kiss mark	Hotstar	Maya
2023	Shabana (Surkh)	Atrangi	Saba
2022	Bhaiya Ji Smile	MX Player	Sajni
2021	Runaway lugayi	MX Player	Maina
2021	Raat baki hai	Zee 5	Special appearance

== Television ==
Year(s)	Title	Character	Language	Remarks
2016	Amma	Sarla	Hindi	Zee Tv
2014	Aati Ranhegi Bahare	Aarohi	Hindi	Shagun TV
2013	Mera Gaon Mera Desh	Kusum	Hindi	Doordarshan

== Awards ==
- Mumbai Global Achievers (2016)
- India Unbound Best Upcoming Actress (2018)
- Bharat Samman (2022)
