= Jamie Love =

Jamie Love may refer to:

- Jamie Love (activist) (born 1995), LGBT activist
- James Love (NGO director) (born 1950), director of Knowledge Ecology International
- Jamie Love (softball) (born 1990), New Zealand softball player

== See also ==
- James Love (disambiguation)
