= Kainaat Arora =

Indian actress

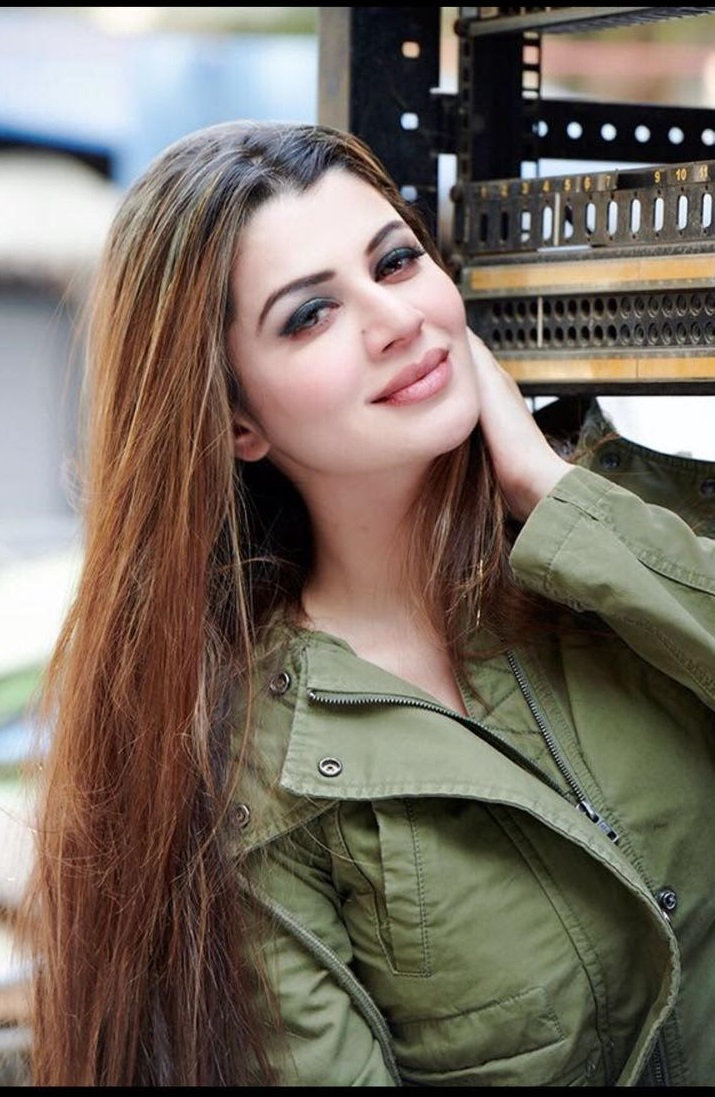
- Kainaat Arora
- Born: 2 December 1982 (age 43); Saharanpur, Uttar Pradesh, India
- Other name: Kainaat
- Occupations: Actress, model
- Years active: 2010–
- Relatives: Divya Bharti (cousin)

Kainaat Arora (born 2 December 1982) is an Indian actress who made her Bollywood debut in comedy film Grand Masti as Marlow. She also appeared in Mankatha and Khatta Meetha, and sang in Malayalam films.

== Early life ==
Arora was born in a Punjabi family in Saharanpur, Uttar Pradesh. She is the second cousin of late actress Divya Bharti. In 2012, Kainaat adopted an elder lady and has been taking care of her.

== Career ==
In 2026, she appeared in a Muslim social drama Teesri Begum, produced and directed by k C Bokadia. The lead roles are played by Kainaat, Mugdha Godse, Rachna Shyam, Supriya Karnik, and Zarina Wahab. The film was released on 22 May 2026. The film revolves around three women, Pooja Dixit (renamed as Nagma), Tabassum and Shabana, married to a Muslim man. It was major flop.

== Filmography ==
Year	Film	Role	Language	Notes
2010	Khatta Meetha	Chingari	Hindi	Special appearance
2011	Mankatha	Item Number	Tamil	Cameo appearance
2013	Grand Masti	Marlow	Hindi	
2014	Khoobsurat	Hiriye	Hindi	
2015	Lailaa O Lailaa	Lailaa	Malayalam	
2015	Mogali Puvvu / Secret		Telugu / Hindi	Bilingual film
2015	Faraar	Nikki/Jasmine	Punjabi	
2018	Jagga Jiunda E	Harleen	Punjabi	
2019	Kitty Party	Jasmin Kaur	Punjabi	
2022	Ishq Pashmina		Hindi	
2024	Tipppsy	Yami	Hindi	
2026	Teesri Begum		Hindi	
