= James Love =

James, Jim, or Jimmy Love may refer to:

== Politics ==
- James Love (Kentucky politician) (1795–1874), U.S. representative from Kentucky
- Jimmy L. Love Sr., American politician, member of the North Carolina General Assembly

== Sport ==
- Jimmy Love (footballer) (1858–1882), Scottish footballer
- Jim Love (rugby league), Australian rugby league footballer who played in the 1910s and 1920s
- Jimmy Love (Australian soccer) (fl. 1921–1923), Australian soccer player
- Jim Love (rugby union) (born 1953), New Zealand rugby union footballer and coach
- Jim Love (cricketer) (born 1955), English cricketer
- James Love (rugby union, born 1987), English rugby union footballer

== Others ==
- James Love (poet) (1721–1774), British actor, playwright and poet
- Sir James Frederick Love (1789–1866), British general
- James M. Love (1820–1891), United States federal judge
- James Robinson Love (1836–1914), Australian merchant and founder of J. R. Love & Co Ltd and Kinkara Tea
- James Robert Beattie Love (1889–1947), Presbyterian clergyman and authority on the Worrorra people of Western Australia
- Jim Love (artist) (1927–2005), American modernist sculptor
- James Love (NGO director) (born 1950), American NGO director in field of intellectual property
- James Love, Canadian guitarist and member of Men Without Hats
- James Love, American guitarist and member of The Dillinger Escape Plan

== See also ==
- Jamie Love (disambiguation)
