= Ashutosh Phatak =

- Education: University of Pennsylvania
- Occupations: Music Composer, Music Producer, Businessman
- Known for: blueFROGG, The True School of Music
- Notable work: Mumbai Diaries Season 2; Mumbai Diaries 26/11; Fire in the Blood; HELP; White Noise; Bombay Boys; Zubaan
- Musical career
- Years active: 1990s–present
- Formerly of: Orphean Revival

Ashutosh Phatak is a composer, producer, multi-instrumentalist and entrepreneur based in Mumbai. He is one of the founding partners of live music chain blueFROG, co-founder of The True School of Music, and The Quarter. He is the founder of singShala music learning app formerly known as Learn to Sing. Ashu has composed music for over 4000 television commercials, soundtracks for over 10 feature films, and released over 15 contemporary music albums.

== Biography ==
=== Early life and career beginnings ===
Ashu, who did his schooling at the Cathedral & John Connon School, formed an informal band with his school friends, where he handled singing responsibilities. After earning a degree in Economics with a minor in Western Classical Music Theory from the University of Pennsylvania, he returned to Mumbai and did a short stint in his family business.

Simultaneously, Ashu composed music for TV serials and commercials, and re-congregated his previous band to form Orphean Revival (1993–95).

In 1995, Ashu was responsible for one of the first original score to be created for an Indian fashion show. He composed a score for designers Abu Jani and Sandeep Khosla, and this was again performed at the Femina Miss India contest later in the year.

=== Career ===
==== Composer ====
Ashu and Dhruv formed Smoke, a music production company that created music for commercials, TV serials and films. This creative partnership lead to composing the music for films like Tamanna (1997), Bombay Boys (1998), Snip! (2000), White Noise (2005), Broken Thread (2007), MP3: Mera Pehla Pehla Pyaar (2007), The Whisperers (2009) and Help (2010). As a solo composer, Ashu has also created the background scores for films such as Fire in the Blood (2013) which was premiered at the Sundance Film Festival in 2013 where it was nominated for the Grand Jury prize and Zubaan (2015) which premiered at the Busan Film Festival in 2015, was released mid-2016. He recently completed music for 'The Ashram', a film that released in early 2018.

==== Musician ====
Ashu has been a part of over 15 contemporary music albums. He and Dhruv released Smoke Signals (2008), an album that has been in the making for 8 years, and one that features the duo's hit songs from their films. 2008 also saw the release of Ashu's debut solo album Sigh of an Angel where he collaborated with Australian artist Aurora Jane, acclaimed jazz guitarist Sanjay Divecha, Dhruv, drummer Lindsay D'mello and singers Vivienne Pocha and Carolisa Monteiro. Ashu handled keyboards, vocals and guitar responsibilities. This was followed by The Psychic Plumber and Other Lies (2011), a multimedia project between Ashu and popular contemporary artist Sarnath Banerjee. Inspired by the products and advertising of the 70s and 80s, this collaboration culminated in a combination of text and drawings, sound and music, to recreate life in pre-liberalisation India.

The Petri Dish Project, an ambient psychedelic rock album with an acoustic as well as an electronic vibe, saw Ashu regroup with Lindsay D'Mello, and collaborate with a host of other musicians such as Monica Dogra, Suman Sridhar, Anushka Manchanda, Saba Azad, and JD Thirumalai.

==== Entrepreneur ====
===== blueFROG =====
In 2008, Ashu and Dhruv, along with fellow partners Simran Mulchandani, Srila Chatterjee and Mahesh Mathai launched blueFROG, a live music venue in Lower Parel, Mumbai.

The brand that single-handedly changed the face of the live independent music scene in India with clubs in Pune and Bangalore. The Delhi outlet shut for a few months in 2012 before reopening in a new avatar. blueFROG Mumbai shut down in August 2016.

===== The True School of Music =====
In 2013, Ashu, along with noted sound engineer Nitin Chandy and other partners from related fields, united to form The True School of Music. India's first comprehensive institute of contemporary music. True School's core purpose is to educate aspiring musicians, music producers, sound engineers, DJ's, music teachers and music business professionals to make music their long-term sustainable career and to empower them to bring positive change, innovation and global competitiveness to the Indian music industry.

Ashu also teaches the Music in Advertising module to students doing the professional level course.

Ashu is Pro-Vice Chancellor - Institutional Impact at Vijaybhoomi University.

===== The Quarter =====
Phatak joined musician Ranjit Barot, businessman Nakul Toshniwal, and restaurateur Nico Goghavala to form The Quarter, within the newly restored Royal.

===== singShala =====
Ashu later entered the digital space with the development of a vocal learning application called singShala. The platform is designed to provide guided singing instruction through a structured interface. It incorporates features such as real-time feedback and interactive lessons, and includes elements such as music-related activities and user challenges as part of the learning process.

== Filmography ==
As composer:

- Tamanna (1997)
- Bombay Boys (1998)
- Snip! (2000)
- White Noise (2005)
- Broken Thread (2007)
- MP3: Mera Pehla Pehla Pyaar (2007)
- HELP (2010)
- Fire in the Blood (2013)
- Zubaan (2015)
- Rejctx (2020)
- Unpaused (2020)
- Feels like Ishq (2021)
- The Empire (2021)
- Mumbai Diaries 26/11 (2021)
- Yeh Haalath feat. Zara Khan (2021)
- Mumbai Diaries Season 2 (2023)
- Freedom at Midnight (2024 - present)

As Music Director:

- Snip! (2000)
- Mulit (2003)
- Zubaan (2015)

As Music Supervisor:

- From Durban to Tomorrow (2020)

As Music Arranger:

- King of Bollywood (2004)

As sound editor:

- In Theory (2012)
