= Sophia Handa =

Indian actress and model

- Born: Mumbai, India
- Occupation(s): Actress, model
- Spouse: 2005- present

Sophia Handa is an Indian actress and model. She is best known for winning the Gladrags Mrs.India 2009 competition, a competition for Indian married women. She made her Bollywood debut in the 2010 Bollywood horror film, Help, which co-stars Bobby Deol and Mugdha Godse.

== Gladrags Mrs. India 2009 ==
In 2009, Handa won 1st place at the Gladrags Mrs. India 2009 competition.

== Bollywood ==
Handa made her debut in the 2010 Bollywood horror, Help, directed by Rajeev Virani, in which she stars alongside Bobby Deol and Mugdha Godse. The film released on 13 August.
