= Lailaa O Lailaa =

- Theatrical release poster
- Directed by: Joshiy
- Written by: Suresh Nair
- Produced by: Santhosh Kottayi; Biju Antony; Preeta Nair
- Starring: Mohanlal; Amala Paul; Sathyaraj
- Cinematography: Loganathan Srinivasan
- Edited by: Shyam Sasidharan
- Music by: Gopi Sundar
- Production company: Finecut Entertainments
- Distributed by: Maxlab Cinemas and Entertainments & Tricolor Entertainment
- Release date: 14 May 2015 (India)
- Running time: 168 minutes
- Country: India
- Language: Malayalam

Lailaa O Lailaa is a 2015 Indian Malayalam-language action comedy film directed by Joshiy. It stars Mohanlal and Amala Paul alongside a supporting cast of Sathyaraj, Joy Mathew, Sreerag Nambiar, Rahul Dev and Kainaat Arora. Bollywood screenwriter Suresh Nair debuted in Malayalam as writer in the film. The original soundtrack and background score were composed by Gopi Sunder.

The film introduced the state's first equity crowdfunding model of film production, being produced by Santhosh Kottayi, Bijou Antony, and Preeta Nair under the banner Finecut Entertainments Pvt Ltd in association with Aashirvad Cinemas.

Principal photography began at the end of August 2014. The first schedule was in Kochi, Goa Tirunelveli and Mysore; the second schedule was in Bangalore and Mumbai and the final schedule was at Kochi, Bangalore and Bellary. The film was originally scheduled for a 110-day shoot and was completed within a span of 7 months. The film was dubbed and released in Tamil as Murugavel, Telugu as Iddaru Iddare.

The film was released in theatres across India on 14 May 2015, and generally received negative reviews from critics.

== Plot ==
Jai Mohan (Mohanlal) leads a double life, and he is a special NIA agent of a special task force of the Indian government created to counter terrorism in India. Jai Mohan and his chief Shaheed Khadar (Sathyaraj) operate in Bengaluru under a cover setup of exporting business under the name "Deccan Exporters" by disguise. Jai falls in love with Anjali Menon (Amala Paul) and marries her, for the reason he is constantly hazed by his chief.

One day, Anjali follows Jai on suspicion of having an affair and accidentally meet each other, which he is forced to reveal that he is an undercover agent who operates as a civilian. Meanwhile, Victor Rana (Rahul Dev), a terrorist who was caught and locked after Interrogation, escapes by trick. To catch Victor Rana, Shaheed asks Anjali to act as Laila, a bar dancer, Victor's girlfriend. Anjali finally agrees and is trained as a regular in bar dancing.

Victor Rana's men take Anjali Menon, knowing she is Laila. But Jai tracks them and arrives at a businessman and a party animal Mittal's house. Anjali is found tied to a chair with her mouth taped shut. Jai Mohan fights through the militants and rescues Anjali. Jai, by arranging the evidence and facts, understands that the terrorist's plan is to destroy an airplane carrying the former US president and finds them through a commercial mini-drone and kills them.

== Cast ==
- Mohanlal as Agent Jai Mohan / Agent X
- Amala Paul as Anjali Menon
- Sathyaraj as Shaheed Kadar
- Kainaat Arora as Laila
- Ramya Nambeeshan as Ramya, Jai's ex-wife
- Joy Mathew as Dr. Aravind Menon, Anjali's father
- Rahul Dev as Victor Rana
- Junaid Sheikh as Dilawar
- Sendrayan as Manimaran
- Sudheer Sukumaran as Salil
- Kazan Khan as Dhara
- Vijay Menon as Christy
- Kala Kalyani as Priya
- Anjali Aneesh Upasana as Officer
- Santhana Bharathi as Minister
- Arya Rohit as Deccan Exports Receptionist
- Ganja Karuppu as Auto Driver
- Babloo Prithviraj as Kuppuswamy
- Saiju Kurup as Happy Babu
- Sreerag Nambiar
- Kiran Raj

== Production ==
=== Development ===
Earlier Suresh Nair met Mohanlal regarding doing a project together but shelved the idea due to Mohanlal's packed schedule. However, in April 2013, Suresh confirmed that he is doing a Malayalam film with Joshiy and Mohanlal. The team met again in July to have further discussions on the project. On 16 November 2013, Mohanlal confirmed the project through his Facebook page. He announced the title as Lailaa O Lailaa and stated it would have Amala Paul in the lead and would be produced by Finecut Entertainments. It is the second collaboration of the trio Joshiy-Mohanlal-Amala after the success of Run Babby Run (2012). There were several reports in online news medias that Mohanlal would play an investigation officer in the film.

=== Financing ===
The film introduced a new concept of film financing in Malayalam cinema. The idea was developed by three NRIs based in the Middle East - Santhosh Kottayi, Bijou Antony, and Preeta Nair. The trio formed the production company FineCut Entertainments Private Ltd. The funds for the film were collected through a fundraising technique known as equity crowdfunding, a popular idea in the west to raise funds for start-ups. The model permits anyone to invest in the production company, who can then expect preferential shares in return. The idea perceives film financing as a prospective investment venture. Unlike crowdfunding, where funds are mobilised from the public, equity funding allows investors to own shares and remain investors for a longer period, and they can benefit from the future production and distribution projects of the same company. Dividends are distributed to each investor based on the profitability of the company.

The model ensures that the movie sails through the break-even point, its total budget realized, prior to its release. Bijou Antony, one of the directors, said, "We have moulded the concept of crowd-equity funding in such a way that our friends and colleagues, who are interested in our movie project, could be part of the venture by investing in it. The investments are capped at a maximum of Rs 5 lakh per investor, which is well within the risk appetite of the investor profile we have had so far".

=== Casting ===
Mohanlal is in the lead along with Amala Paul for the second time after Run Babby Run. Tamil actor Sathyaraj was chosen for a pivotal role in the film. Earlier, there were speculations regarding the change in the heroine as soon as actress Amala Paul announced her wedding. Several reports suggested that Manju Warrier would replace Amala Paul, and that writer Suresh Nair was keen to cast Manju opposite Mohanlal. But no official confirmations came out, and the production team remained silent, leaving it as rumours only. Later in an interview, Amala confirmed that she would play the lead opposite Mohanlal, and the shoot of the film would begin in August 2014.

During the pre-production stage, there were reports about Sonu Sood playing the antagonist opposite Mohanlal. However, there was no official confirmation. In an interview Ramya Nambeeshan stated she would be a part of Lailaa O Lailaa in a cameo role.

On 11 September 2014. Times of India reported that Ashvin Mathew had been cast in a role. It was also reported that Joy Mathew would be seen in the movie. It is the first time he is doing a film with Mohanlal. Bollywood actress Kainaat Arora is doing a pivotal role in the movie. "I really don't have the liberty to open up about my role. All I can say is that my character is pivotal to the story, and the central plot revolves around her. That's not all, I have a lot of combination scenes with Mohanlal," she says. Rahul Dev will play the antagonist opposite Mohanlal. Confirming the news scriptwriter Suresh Nair said, "Rahul Dev has been roped in to play a villain. He has joined the set in Bangalore.". Amala Paul's brother Abhijeet Paul also has a role in the film. During the final schedule, Junaid Sheikh joined the crew who acted in Salaam Kashmir (2014) with Joshiy playing a villain.

=== Filming ===
The filming was postponed multiple times. There were also reports that the shooting was shelved due to creative differences. But Joshiy clean off all the rumours and confirmed that the project is very much on board. In February 2014, it was heard the shooting will start on 15 June 2014 which never happened.

The principal photography commenced on 31 August 2014. The filming was scheduled for a long 110 days. The film was shot at different locations across Goa, Mysore, Tirunelveli, Mumbai, Bangalore, Tharangambadi and Ernakulam. Laila O Laila was originally scheduled to release during Christmas 2014 but could not complete filming. The second schedule was set to begin only after Mohanlal completes filming for Sathyan Anthikkad film.

On 30 October, Mohanlal announced that the second schedule of production was over in Bangalore and Kochi with 80 percent of filming being completed. The production team planned to regroup after taking a break for filming the climax action sequences. After the break, the third schedule started at Ernakulam in December's second week after Mohanlal returned from his Antarctican tour on 5 December 2014. Mohanlal's part was then planned to be completed first in the third schedule. The final schedule went off in February 2015 at Kochi, and the team went to Bangalore for shooting the remaining action sequences. The climax was shot in Bellary, Karnataka, in 5 to 7 days schedule.

== Marketing ==
An official first look logo (title design) was unveiled in November 2013. A redesigned title look was revealed on 5 April 2015. The first look of the official posters were released on 6 April 2015, with the tagline The Biggest Risk of His Life...His Wife. On 8 April, the production team announced the official trailer will be unveiled on the auspicious day of Vishu on 15 April. The first look theatrical poster was released by Mohanlal on his Twitter and Facebook pages respectively on Friday, 10 April. The poster featured Mohanlal and Amala Paul.

Though the trailer was due for release on 15 April, it was delayed due to technical reasons and was released one day later. The trailer received a positive responses from the audience as well as from film personalities and was trending on social media sites. The trailer was peppered with some car chases, exotic locales, and a melodious music track. It garnered over two lakh views within a week. The New Indian Express commented "The film promises to create a genre that has never been seen before in Mollywood. Many of its sequences have been likened to Bollywood flicks. It also marks the coming of age of Malayalam cinema, as it's a unique recipe with all the required ingredients needed for a success story at the box office". LailaaOLailaa the official website was launched on 26 April 2015. Aaraattu (2022 film) & Monster (2022 film) are sequels of this film . mohanlal replaced agent x in all films and all 3 recived negative reviews .

== Music ==
Lailaa O Lailaa

Soundtrack album by Gopi Sundar
- Released: 24 April 2015
- Studio: Sensa Digital World
- Genre: Film soundtrack
- Length: 19:17
- Language: Malayalam
- Label: Muzik 247
- Producer: Gopi Sundar

Gopi Sundar chronology
Ivan Maryadaraman (2015)	Lailaa O Lailaa (2015)	Oru Second Class Yathra (2015)

The soundtrack and film score were composed by Gopi Sunder. He has composed 5 songs in the film. Anna Kathrina has written the lyrics of the title song.

The film's music launch event was held on 24 April 2015 at Kochi. Audio release function was attended by director Joshiy, the main actors, music director Gopi Sunder among others, Anna Katharina, Anjali Nair, A. L. Vijay were some of the guests who attended the event.

Lailaa O Lailaa (Original Motion Picture Soundtrack)
No.	Title	Lyrics	Singer(s)	Length
1.	"Dil Dilvana"	Anna Katharina Valayil, Gopi Sundar	Anna Katharina Valayil	4:16
2.	"Maruhaba" (Male)	B. K. Harinarayanan	K. S. Harisankar	5:11
3.	"Meharuba" (Female)	B. K. Harinarayanan	Preethi Bella	5:11
4.	"Nanayumee Mazhai"	Gilu Joseph	Sithara	4:51
5.	"Rathri Mulla Than"	B. K. Harinarayanan	Najim Arshad, Radhika Narayanan	4:39
6.	"Lailaa O Lailaa Theme"	Gopi Sundar	Gopi Sundar	1:12
Total length:				25:43

== Release ==
The film released on 14 May 2015 in 168 screens all over India, distributed by Maxlab Cinemas and Entertainments in about 106 screens in Kerala alone and remaining in rest of India including Bengaluru, Chennai, Mumbai, Delhi, Gujarat, Pune, Coimbatore, Punjab, Goa, Madhya Pradesh and Hyderabad.

=== Critical reception ===
IB Times said that the movie has failed to meet the expectations of the viewers regarding the pre-release hype.

Sify.coms reviewer said the concept, basic storyline, and presentation have been inspired from the loud commercial masala flicks of the 1980s or even before. Storyline is similar to James Cameron's 1994 film True Lies. Sify also criticized Suresh Nair's script, saying the actors are wasted in the script and that the music did not meet expectations Paresh C Palicha of Rediff.com rated 1.5 out of 5 stars and called it "A tacky film that wasted the resources at its disposal", stating "This film is stretched in many directions and everything is shabbily handled. It is as if the makers hoped that every flaw would be glossed over by the charm of the actors. This does not happen, and the actors are not to blame." Arathi Kannan of Malayala Manorama stated that "Mohanlal looks uncomfortable, to the say the least, in the movie. It's not his day, not his movie." She also wrote, "A recent spoof movie in Malayalam was bang on when it came to exposing such overstated scenarios in Malayalam cinema." Veeyen of Nowrunning.com rated the film 2 out of 5 and said, "Lailaa O lalaa is a sparkless action caper that digs through implausibly convoluted cinematic cliches to narrate a tale that seems to scoff at us for being told. Of the many bullets that are fired in the film, none remains engraved in our memory as much as the colossal style-over-substance misfire from scenarist Suresh Nair who has penned this massive fiasco that fittingly qualifies as a foggy snoozer."
