= Peter Rost =

Peter Rost may refer to:

- Peter Rost (doctor) (born 1959), former vice president of the drug company Pfizer
- Peter Rost (politician) (1930–2022), British Conservative Party MP 1970–1992
- Peter Rost (handballer) (born 1951), German team handball player
