= Dylan Mohan Gray =

Indian and Canadian filmmaker

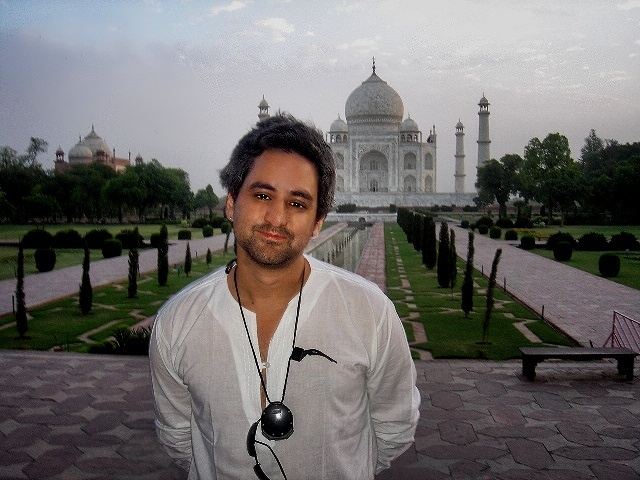
- Dylan Mohan Gray, Agra, 2005
- Education: Dartmouth College, Central European University
- Occupations: Director, producer, screenwriter

Dylan Mohan Gray is an Indian and Canadian filmmaker. His documentary feature film Fire in the Blood, premiered in competition at the 2013 Sundance Film Festival and went on to enjoy the longest theatrical run of any non-fiction film in Indian cinema history (five weeks). An official selection at over 100 leading film festivals which was honoured with major awards and accolades worldwide, Fire in the Blood altered the global conversation around access to essential medicine, and in 2018 was named one of "26 landmark documentary films of the past seven decades" in a major retrospective curated by legendary documentarian John Pilger.

Dylan directed Netflix's first Indian-themed non-fiction original film, The King of Good Times (2020), about the spectacular rise and fall of controversial Indian tycoon Vijay Mallya and his ill-fated venture, Kingfisher Airlines. The film opens the Netflix Original documentary anthology series, Bad Boy Billionaires: India, the release of which was delayed due to legal injunctions in India. It enjoyed a multiple-week run as the #1 most-watched title on Netflix India when it finally released and was the most-watched documentary of the year 2020 in India, receiving India's top film honour, the Filmfare Award, in 2021.

Dylan's mid-length film on the future of global health and human rights, From Durban to Tomorrow (2020), shot in six countries on three continents, was selected at over 100 film festivals and won over 35 international awards (as of December 2021). His narrative feature script, The Last Day of Winter (co-written with Vikramaditya Motwane), was incubated at the Sundance Institute | Mumbai Mantra Screenwriting Lab.

He used to teach as the Visiting Professor of History (exploring intersections between history and film) at the Central European University in Budapest, where he had earlier completed his MA, and in 2016 was chosen from over 13,000 graduates to receive the CEU's inaugural Alumni Impact Award.

He lives and works in Mumbai.

== Early life ==
Born on Prince Edward Island off Canada's Atlantic coast, where his biologist father served as a national park warden, Gray grew up with a keen interest in theatre, first as a child actor, then later moving into writing and directing plays, followed soon thereafter by videos (often using equipment borrowed from school sports programs).

He was originally trained as a contemporary historian and expected to continue his career in academia, but began working in the film industry after a chance meeting in Budapest with a former acting colleague who was there working as an assistant director with David Cronenberg. He would go on to serve in various key capacities (often credited as "D. Dylan Gray") on international feature films in over thirty countries worldwide, working in close collaboration with numerous acclaimed directors including Fatih Akin, Peter Greenaway, Paul Greengrass, Deepa Mehta and Mira Nair.

Gray studied History and Film at Dartmouth College (USA), as well as at the University of Vienna and the Budapest University of Economics. He holds graduate degrees in History from the Central European University and the University of the State of New York, with research focussed on historiography and geographic dimensions of identity. He was also a resident in Film at Canada's famed Banff Centre for Arts and Creativity.

== Awards and nominations ==
- Best Nonfiction Original, Series/Special, 2021 Filmfare OTT Awards, December 2021
- Grand Jury Award, The White Sands International Film Festival, New Mexico, September 2014
- Friedrich-Ebert-Stiftung Prize for Political Film, Filmfest Hamburg, October 2013
- DOXA Feature Documentary Award, DOXA Documentary Film Festival, Vancouver, May 2013
