= Football (film) =

- Directed by: Radhakrishnan
- Screenplay by: Shyam Krishna
- Story by: P. P. Subair
- Starring: Nedumudi Venu; Zarina Wahab
- Cinematography: Indhu
- Edited by: Ramesh
- Music by: Johnson
- Production company: Mummy Films
- Distributed by: Mummy Release
- Release date: 19 March 1982
- Country: India
- Language: Malayalam

Football is a 1982 Indian Malayalam-language film directed by Radhakrishnan and written by Shyam Krishna from a story by P. P. Subair. The film stars Nedumudi Venu and Zarina Wahab in the lead roles. The film has musical score by Johnson.

== Cast ==
- Nedumudi Venu
- Zarina Wahab
- Maniyanpilla Raju
- Mohanlal
- Ravishankar
- Anu

== Soundtrack ==
The music was composed by Johnson and the lyrics were written by Shyam Krishna, Poovachal Khader and Anwar Suber.

No.	Song	Singers	Lyrics	Length (m:ss)
1	"Aashaane"	Johnson, Chorus	Shyam Krishna	
2	"Ithalillathoru Pushpam"	K. J. Yesudas	Poovachal Khader	
3	"Manassinte Moham"	P. Susheela	Anwar Suber	
