= Mugdha Godse =

Indian actress (born 1986)

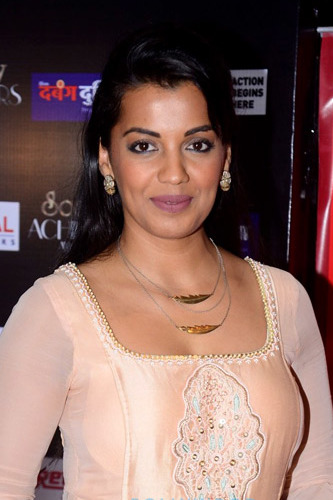
- Godse in 2018
- Born: Mugdha Veira Godse; 26 July 1986 (age 40); Pune, Maharashtra, India
- Occupations: Actress; model
- Years active: 2004–present

Mugdha Veira Godse (born 26 July 1986) is an Indian actress and model who works in Hindi films. A former model, Godse was a semi-finalist at the Femina Miss India 2004 competition. She made her acting debut in Madhur Bhandarkar's 2008 film, Fashion. She was one of the judges in a Marathi reality show, Marathi Paul Padte Pudhe.

== Early life and modelling career ==
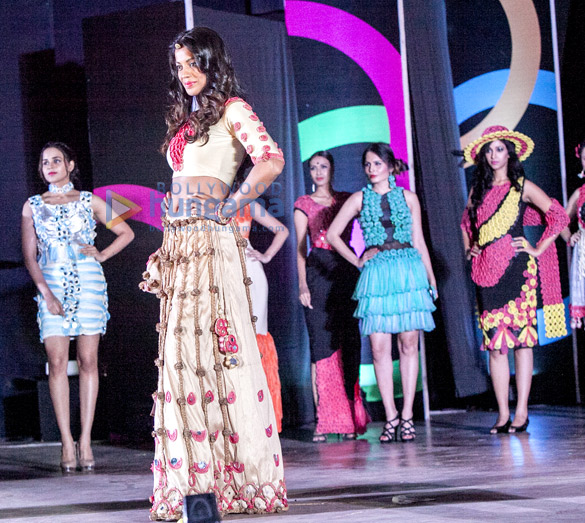
Mugdha Godse

Godse was born on 26 July 1986 to in Pune. She did her schooling from Nutan Marathi Vidyalaya, Pune. Godse completed her Bachelor of Commerce degree from Marathwada Mitra Mandal College of Commerce in Pune. During her early days, Godse sold oil and only earned Rs.100 a day. She then started working out in the gym and participated in local beauty contests. In 2002, she participated and won the Gladrags Mega Model Hunt. In 2004, Godse took part in the biggest modelling contest in India, the Femina Miss India contest. She reached the semi-finals and won the Miss Perfect Ten title. She then moved to Mumbai and started modelling.

Godse has appeared in commercials, including, an Airtel commercial with Shah Rukh Khan, a Close-Up toothpaste commercial, and a Hollandia Yoghurt commercial. She has spent over five years in the modelling field, doing press ads, music videos, commercials and walking the runway at national and international ramps. She appeared in the Hindi film Fashion, directed by Madhur Bhandarkar, and with Priyanka Chopra, Kangana Ranaut and Arbaaz Khan.

She was honoured with Global Cinema Award of eighth Global Film Festival Noida by Sandeep Marwah of Asian Academy of Film & Television.

== Film career ==
Godse made her debut with the film Fashion (2008), alongside Priyanka Chopra and Kangana Ranaut. She was nominated for the Filmfare Award for Best Female Debut and won the Apsara Award for Best Female Debutante.

In 2009, Godse appeared in two films, All The Best, and Jail. She appeared in Help opposite Bobby Deol, and it was released on 13 August 2010. Gali Gali Chor Hai was released in February 2012 and Will You Marry Me? was released in March 2012. Godse and boyfriend Rahul Dev appeared in Power Couple reality show.

In 2026, she appeared in a Muslim social drama Teesri Begum, produced and directed by K C Bokadia. The lead roles are played by Kainaat Arora, Godse, Rachna Shyam, Supriya Karnik, and Zarina Wahab. The film was released on 22 May 2026. Revolving around three women, Pooja Dixit (renamed as Nagma), Tabassum and Shabana, married to a Muslim man, it was major flop.

== Media image ==
In 2021, Godse was placed at 30th position in Times of India "50 Beautiful Faces" list.

== Personal life ==
Godse is in a relationship with actor Rahul Dev.

== Filmography ==
=== Film ===
Key
†	Denotes films that have not yet been released

Year	Film	Role	Notes
2008	Fashion	Janet Sequeira	Nominated—Filmfare Award for Best Female Debut
2009	All the Best: Fun Begins	Vidya Kapoor	
2009	Jail	Maansi Pandit	
2010	Help	Pia Alves / Dia Alves	
2011	Oh God! Saare Hain Fraud	Pinky	
2012	Gali Gali Chor Hai	Amita	
2012	Will You Marry Me?	Sneha	
2012	Heroine	Rhea Mehra	
2013	Saheb, Biwi Aur Gangster Returns	Herself	Special appearance in item song "Media Se"
2013	Satyagraha	Malini Mishra	Cameo appearance
2015	Kaagaz Ke Fools	Nikki Tripathi	
2015	Bezubaan Ishq	Suhani	
2015	Thani Oruvan	Shilpa	Tamil film, Special appearance
2015	Ishq Ne Crazy Kiya Re	Isha	
2019	Sharmaji Ki Lag Gai	Shobha	
2019	Pagal Kar Diya Toone		
2021	Mera Fauji Calling	Paridhi	
2022	Coffee		
2023	Khela Hobe	Shabbo	
2026	Teesri Begum		
2026	Frame	Chandu's wife	Marathi film

=== Television ===
Year	TV Show	Role	TV Channel
2011	Marathi Paul Padate Pudhe	Judge	Zee Marathi
2014	Comedy Nights with Kapil	Guest	Colors TV
2014	Fear Factor: Khatron Ke Khiladi 5	Contestant	Colors TV
2015	Power Couple	Contestant	Sony Entertainment Television

=== Web series ===
Year	Title	Role	Platform	Notes
2022	Bloody Brothers	Tanya	ZEE5	
2022	The Broken News	Gulnaaz Khan	ZEE5	

=== Music videos ===
- Koka Tera Koka (Jassi — T-Series)
- Mauja Len De (Daler Mehndi — T-series)
- Main Tujhse Milne Aayi Mandir Jaane Ke Bahane (Musicurry - Times Music)
- Le Kar Hum Deewana Dil (Times Music)
- Chhup Chhup Khade Ho (Jagdish Mali — Times Music)
- Jab Chaye Mera Jadoo (with Irfan Pathan — Sony Music India)

== Contests ==
- Participated and won the Gladrags Mega Model Contest in 2002. She also won the Miss Body Beautiful 2002 title in the same event.
- Participated in the Ponds Femina Miss India 2004 contest. Won the Miss Perfect 10 Title.
- Participated in Best Model of the World 2002. Won award for the Best National Costume as Miss India

== Awards and nominations ==
Year	Film	Award	Category	Result	Ref.
2009	Fashion	Filmfare Awards	Best Female Debut	Nominated	
2009	Fashion	Screen Awards	Best Supporting Actress	Nominated	
2009	Fashion	Producers Guild Film Awards	Best Female Debut	Won	
2009	Fashion	MaTa Sanman Awards	Best Female Debut	Won	
2009	Fashion	Stardust Awards	Breakthrough Performance – Female	Nominated	
2010	All The Best: Fun Begins	Stardust Awards	Breakthrough Performance – Female	Nominated	
2010	Jail	Stardust Awards	Superstar of Tomorrow – Female	Won	
