= Khela Hobe (film) =

- Directed by: Sunil C Sinha
- Story by: Ravi Kumar
- Produced by: Kumari Manju
- Starring: Om Puri; Mugdha Godse; Manoj Joshi; Rati Agnihotri
- Cinematography: Ravi Bhat
- Edited by: Shiva Bayappa
- Music by: Sanjiv Chaturvedi; Ajay Keshwani; Rakesh Trivedi; Harsh Raj Harsh
- Production companies: Theme Arts International; Sunil C Sinha Production
- Distributed by: United Media Works
- Release date: 24 February 2023
- Running time: 124 minutes
- Country: India
- Language: Hindi

Khela Hobe is a 2023 Indian Hindi-language film starring Om Puri and Mugdha Godse. The film gathered the headlines due to its title as it is one of the famous slogan of the Bangladeshi politicians Shamim Osman in 2006 later 2018 West Bengal Chief Minister Mamta Banerjee. The censor board had chopped few dialogues as it was objectionable.

== Plot ==
This story revolves around a woman who decides to contest election to take revenge against the oppression faced by her and her family, She fights election with a new agenda, other contender's fight election on the basis of secularism and progress in town, whether the major contenders using the ancient agenda of secularism or progress would win, or there will be some surprise in the result.

== Cast ==
- Om Puri as Fareek Bhai
- Mugdha Godse as Shabbo
- Manoj Joshi as Bachchu Lal
- Rushad Rana as Thakur Virendra Pratap
- Rati Agnihotri as Om Puri wife Ruksana
- Sanjay Batra as Girish Gupta
- Sanjay Sonu as Israr bhai
- Ratan Mayal as Doctor
- Shefali as a badminton player (young)
- Aaryan A as boyfriend of Shefali

== Production ==
Khela Hobe is produced under the banner of Theme Arts International and Sunil C Sinha Production and presented by UMW media. The film is produced by Kumari Manju and directed by Sunil C Sinha. The story and dialogue by Ravi Kumar and music and lyrics by Sanjiv Chaturvedi and Rajesh Trivedi. Ajay Keshwani and Harsh Raj Harsh have also given the music.The film has been shot in Mumbai and Varanasi.It will release in the theatre on 24 February 2023.
