= Atharva Sudame =

Indian influencer (born 1998)

- Education: Marathwada Mitra Mandal College of Commerce
- Occupations: Comedian; social media influencer; YouTuber; actor
- Years active: 2015–present
- Spouse: Rucha Joshi (m. 2023)

YouTube information
- Channel: Atharva Sudame
- Genre: Comedy
- Subscribers: 1.36 million
- Views: 1.15 billion

Comedy career
- Medium: Social media
- Genres: Satire; parody; slapstick; dark comedy; observational comedy; roast
- Subjects: Everyday life; Indian culture; social issues; Marathi culture
- Last updated: 12 October 2025

Atharva Sudame (Marathi pronunciation: [əˈtʰərʋə suːˈd̪aːmeː]) is an Indian social media influencer, comedian, actor, and YouTuber based in Pune, Maharashtra. Sudame known for his relatable humor and innovative videos inspired by everyday life. He gained widespread media coverage following the controversy over a reel he posted during Ganesh Chaturthi, which promoted religious harmony.

== Early life ==
Atharva Sudame completed his schooling at Modern English School and earned a Bachelor of Commerce degree from Marathwada Mitra Mandal College of Commerce.

== Career ==
He started creating comedy videos in 2015, mainly in Marathi, includes skits focused on family dynamics, relationships, and cultural nuances. Describing his journey, Atharva shares, "I had been making videos since 2015–16. But at that time, there was no medium like Instagram available, so I didn't broadcast them anywhere. When Instagram launched in 2019, I started posting my content there. In 2021, one of my videos reached a large audience, and that's when my follower count began to grow."

Sudame later ventured into acting in the 2023 Marathi film Boyz 4, the fourth installment of the Boyz franchise.

== Personal life ==
Atharva married his longtime girlfriend, Rucha Joshi, on January 26, 2023, in Pune. Rucha Joshi is often involved in his content creation and stage performances.

== Controversies ==
=== Ganeshotsav controversy 2025 ===
In August 2025, Atharva became embroiled in controversy after posting a reel during Ganeshotsav promoting religious unity. In the video, Sudame portrayed a devotee buying a Ganesha idol from a Muslim artisan. The storyline included Sudame's character delivering a message about religious harmony, inspired by his father: “We should be like sugar, which sweetens both kheer and sheer khurma. We should be like a brick, which builds both temples and mosques".

Though intended to promote Hindu-Muslim unity, the video received sharp backlash from certain groups who accused him of being provocative and misleading. Akhil Bhartiya Brahman Mahasangh claimed the reel misrepresented traditions and Pune. The trolling quickly escalated, resulting in threats and heavy criticism online.

In response to the outrage, Sudame deleted the video and issued a public apology, clarifying that his intention was never to hurt anyone's sentiments. He emphasized that he had long promoted cultural unity through his other content and had no motive other than harmony. The controversy also brought support from some political leaders and activists, who defended the reel's message and called for tolerance.

=== Pune Mahanagar Parivahan Mahamandal Limited controversy 2026 ===
On 2 and 5 January 2026, Pune Mahanagar Parivahan Mahamandal Limited (PMPML) issued a notices to Atharva Sudame, alleged that he created reels inside PMPML buses without permission and illegally used the corporation's uniform, e-machine, and badge.

== Filmography ==
- Boyz 4 (2023)
- Punha Ekda Sade Made Teen (2026)

== Other works ==
- The Atharva Sudame Show, he hosts a Marathi-language talk show on YouTube that features interviews with actors, musicians, and other Marathi and Hindi film personalities.
