= Junaid Sheikh =

Indian actor and model (born 1984)

- Born: 31 July 1984 (age 42); Jammu, India
- Education: Manipal Academy of Higher Education
- Occupations: actor, model

Junaid Sheikh (born 31 July 1984) is an Indian actor and model. Since 2010, Junaid has starred in many commercially successful films in Tamil, Telugu, and Malayalam, often as an antagonist.

== Early life and education ==
Junaid was born on 31 July 1984, in Jammu, India. He attended Presentation Convent High School at Jammu. He graduated with a degree in information technology from Manipal University. After that, he obtained a Master's degree in Business Administration(MBA) in International Business from Arizona.

== Career ==
He began his career in entertainment as a fashion model, modeling for fashion designer Hari Anand and appearing at 2011 Pune Fashion Week, 2013 Kerala International Fashion Week, 2014 Citadel Fashion Fiesta, and 2015 Kerala Fashion League.

He attended Mumbai's Barry John's Acting Studio. His first acting role was in Telugu film Mr. Intelligent, in 2010.

Over a span of five years, Sheikh has appeared in over ten movies in Telugu, Malayalam, and Tamil. He has collaborated with film personalities like Mahesh Babu, Vijay, Jayaram, Suresh Gopi, B. Unni Krishnan, Joshiy, and Mohanlal.

In 2015, he appeared in poorly-received Malayalam-language action comedy film Lailaa O Lailaa directed by Sai Kumar Yadav.

== Television ==
Year	Title	Channel	Language	Notes	ref
2015	Vishwaroopam	FLOWERS TV	Malayalam	TV debut	

== Filmography ==
Year	Film	Role	Language	Notes
2010	Pappu Mr. Intelligent	Ranga	Telugu	
2011	Dhada	Michael	Telugu	
2011	Dookudu	Junaid	Telugu	
2011	Velayudham	Abu Salim	Tamil	
2012	I Love Me	Albert Lawrence	Malayalam	
2014	Salaam Kashmier	Junaid	Malayalam	
2015	Temper	Shiva	Telugu	
2015	Laila O Laila	Dilawar	Malayalam	
