= Zindagi Ek Bhanwar =

2014 Indian TV series

- Genre: Political drama
- Written by: Shoaib Choudhary
- Starring: Zarina Wahab; Tej Sapru; Raza Murad; Anant Jog
- Country of origin: India
- Original language: Hindi
- No. of episodes: 335

Production
- Producer: Shoaib Choudhary

Original release
- Network: DD National
- Release: 16 December 2014 – 2016

Zindagi Ek Bhanwar (styled as Zindagi... Ek Bhanwar) was a political drama TV show which aired on Doordarshan National on 16 December 2014. It was produced and written by Shoaib Choudhary. It starred Zarina Wahab as Sharda Devi and Tej Sapru as the husband of Devi. The show has been televised 335 episodes from Monday to Thursday.

The story revolves around a family with political background, where Sharda Devi was fielded as a political candidate in an Assembly election by her husband, who was a candidate of a seat in a Parliamentary election. This cause a confrontation between Devi and her son, who was aspiring to be a politician.

== Cast ==
- Zarina Wahab as Sharda Devi
- Tej Sapru
- Raza Murad
- Anant Jog
- Shraddha Singh
- Yaqub Ghauri
