= Kitty Party (film) =

- Directed by: Nav Bajwa
- Written by: Nav Bajwa
- Produced by: Arri Production House
- Starring: Kainaat Arora; Gurpreet Ghuggi
- Music by: Ullumanati; Dj Flow
- Release date: 13 December 2019
- Country: India
- Language: Punjabi

Kitty Party is a 2019 Indian comedy film directed by Nav Bajwa. The film stars Kainaat Arora and Gurpreet Ghuggi in lead. Kitty Party tells the story about a group of middle class housewives in Chandigarh who form a kitty, and end up developing an unexpected friendship.

== Plot ==
The film follows 5 middle class housewives who live their life in a regular way. They start off their day with cooking, handling their kids, sending their husbands to work, going for yoga classes, etc. But all the 5 women are best friends and they all enjoy their day with each other. Once in a week they all have kitty party where they play tombola and put a committee in which they all put some money and any one of them can take the total amount. But the change comes when one of them puts a picture on Facebook. She was approached by a woman staying in Goa. She told them to put 5 lacs each in committee and in return they will get 10 lacs in 30 days. All the women agreed to that but after 1 month, they could not find her. They all decided to go to Goa to find her and to get their money back. Will they get their money back? What will be the desi plan they will follow? What will they say to their husbands to go out of station? Every scene will be related to all Punjabi ladies all over the world. Every lady represent different Punjabi language of different parts of Punjab they all will have different characters which will create a lot of comedy.

== Cast ==
- Nav Bajwa as Sunny
- Gurpreet Ghuggi as Cheema Saab
- Kainaat Arora as Jasmin Kaur
- Jaswinder Bhalla as Gurjeet Singh Bhalla
- Upasna Singh as Kulwant Kaur
- Harby Sangha as Shamsher Dhillion
- Anita Devgan as Mrs Dhillion
- Rana Ranbir as Kuku Pardhan
