= Taxi Chor =

- Poster
- Directed by: Sushil Vyas
- Produced by: Dilip Pariyani; Lachhman Tulsiani; Prakash Bhatia
- Starring: Mithun Chakraborty; Zarina Wahab; Bharat Bhushan; Jagdeep
- Music by: Bappi Lahiri
- Release date: 29 August 1980
- Running time: 115 minutes
- Country: India
- Language: Hindi

Taxi Chor (transl. Taxi Thief) is a 1980 Hindi-language Indian action film directed by Sushil Vyas, starring Mithun Chakraborty (in double role), Zarina Wahab, Bharat Bhushan and Jagdeep.

== Plot ==
A mother gives birth to their twins children named as Rajesh and Ritesh and also a girl who was younger sister of them. Shamsher Singh is wanted smuggler who gets arrested by the twins father. And when he is released he want to take revenge on him and one day when he was going in car he and his gang attacks on him and he kills him on off and both the twin children are separated and their sister is being killed one goes to city and becomes a singer and another one becomes a wanted thief.

Rajesh is a crook. But one day Ritesh is rescued from the jail and he for she goes to find the truth why he was arrested and learns that it was because of his lookalike thief. And one day Rakesh's mother comes doubt on him. And he give give influence to Rakesh for doing all this works. When Rakesh was going to his daily work his mother follows him and he goes to grave and when he finds doing all those things he is shocked and fell down by dizziness by seeing all those things from his son. After that he removes a big pit and tries to cheer her when she is alive before that Ritesh stops him and they both start fighting when Rajesh mother's getups she sees both of them fighting and she also discovers that Ritesh is her son and stops both of them. She tells them what happened when they were children and the brothers kill Anthony and his gang. Before Anthony dies he shoots Rakesh and the police comes and arrest the gangsters. Rakesh falls into his mother's hand, tells Ritesh that take care of his mother and dies.

== Cast ==
- Mithun Chakraborty as Rajesh a.k.a. Rakesh / Ritesh (double role)
- Zarina Wahab as Ruby (Ritesh's girlfriend)
- Raj Mehra
- Abhi Bhattacharya
- Madan Puri as Shamsher Singh / Anthony
- Keshto Mukherjee as Robert
- Jagdeep as Jaggu
- Bharat Bhushan
- Mukri

== Soundtrack ==
To this movie all musics were composed by Bappi Lahiri with lyrics by Anjaan. The song "Naa jaane Ek Nigah Nigah Mein" from Gundaraj was inspired from the film Taxi Chor's song " Vada Hain Kya. The song "Vaada Hain Kya" was partly sampled from Santa Esmeralda song "Dont Let Me Be Misunderstood".

Song	Singer
"Vaada Hai Kya, Kya Hai Kasam"	Kishore Kumar
"Na Hum Pagal Hai Aur Na Tu Piyela Hai"	Kishore Kumar, Shailendra Singh
"Jhonka Hawa Ka Jhonka Chhookar Hamen Jaan-E-Jahan"	Kishore Kumar, Usha Mangeshkar
"Yaar Mera Laut Aaya Re, Pyar Mera Laut Aaya Re"	Asha Bhosle, Suresh Wadkar, Anwar
