= Ishq Pashmina =

- Release poster
- Directed by: Arvind Pandey
- Written by: Arvind Pandey
- Produced by: Suraj Surya Mishra and Shalu Mishra
- Starring: Bhavin Bhanushali; Malti Chahar; Zarina Wahab
- Cinematography: Navin V Mishra
- Edited by: Rajesh G Pandey
- Music by: Sham-Balkar, Shashwat Prakhar Bhardwaj & Arvind Pandey
- Production company: KRISHNA SHANTI PRODUCTION
- Release date: 23 September 2022
- Country: India
- Language: Hindi

Ishq Pashmina is a 2022 Indian Hindi-language romantic drama film written and directed by Arvind Pandey and produced by Krishna Shanti Production, starring Bhavin Bhanushali, Malti Chahar (in her Hindi film debut) and Zarina Wahab.

== Plot ==
In the serene and picturesque setting of Mashobra, Karan and Omisha find themselves drawn together by their circumstances. Their connection is unique; one has only ever felt the presence of the other, never seen it. As they grow closer, they become perfect complements to each other. Yet, their destiny might hold a different story. Amidst a backdrop of intense snowfall, a delicate and profound tale unfolds, one that resonates deeply and leaves a lasting impact on the heart.

== Cast ==
- Bhavin Bhanushali as Karan
- Malti Chahar as Omisha
- Zarina Wahab as Karan's mother
- Brijendra Kala
- Kainaat Arora
- Gaurika Mishra
- Vijay Mishra
- Yash Chaurasia
- Vikram Sharma
- Ashna Soni

== Songs ==
- Jogi Ho Gaya- Javed Ali, Prateeksha Srivastava; Music Director - Shashwat Prakhar Bhardwaj & Arvind Pandey; Lyricist - Arvind Pandey
- Aashiqui- Singers - Raj Barman & Prateeksha Srivastava

Music Director - Shashwat Prakhar Bhardwaj Lyricist - Arvind Pandey

- Saaye- Singer - Pranay Bahuguna

Music Director - Sham-Balkar; Lyricist - Sham-Balkar

- Do Ghante- Singer - Sakshi Holkar

Music Director - Sham-Balkar Lyricist - Sham-Balkar

- Bekhabar- Singer - Palak Muchhal

Music Director - Sham-Balkar Lyricist - Sham-Balkar

== Reception ==
A critic from The Times of India wrote that "While Bhavin as Karan delivers an average performance at best, it’s Malti’s performance that carries some semblance of sincerity. This love story is jaded and banal". A review at Film Information, while praising mildly the acting, also criticised the plot, and dialogue and direction too.
