= Teesri Begum =

- Directed by: K C Bokadia
- Written by: K C Bokadia
- Produced by: K C Bokadia
- Starring: Kainaat Arora; Mugdha Godse; Rachna Shyam; Zarina Wahab
- Production company: BMB Productions
- Release date: 22 May 2026
- Country: India
- Language: Hindi
- Box office: est. ₹0.07 crore

Teesri Begum (transl. Third Wife) is a 2026 Indian Hindi-language drama film written, directed, and produced by K.C. Bokadia. The lead roles are played by Kainaat Arora, Mugdha Godse, Rachna Shyam, Supriya Karnik, and Zarina Wahab.

The film was released on 22 May 2026, after a controversy regarding the depiction of Muslims and forced conversion and, in particular, the use of the Hindu devotional expression "Jai Shri Ram" by the Muslim male character, in the original version.

== Plot ==
The film revolves around three women, Pooja Dixit (renamed as Nagma), Tabassum and Shabana.

Pooja, a Hindu woman, gets tricked into marrying Babban Khan, a Muslim man. After the wedding, she comes to know that Babban already has two wives, Tabassum and Shabana.

Later the three wives join hands and decide to fight the inglorious situation and to get out of their marital miseries.

== Cast ==
- Kainaat Arora
- Mugdha Godse
- Rachna Shyam
- Zarina Wahab
- Asrar Khan
- Mainaz Khan

== Soundtrack ==
The soundtrack for Teesri Begum was composed by Iqbal Darbar, Chandra Shekhar Varma, Kaushik Vikas, and Shabab Sabri. The songs were written by lyricist Kaushik Vikas. The songs from the movie include Ek Hi Pal Me sung by Javed Ali and Hey Gange Maiya by Shabab Sabri.

== Controversy ==
The film portrays a Hindu girl who is forced to convert to Islam after she gets married, and, in one scene, the Hindu holy words "Jai Shri Ram" were pronounced by the main male protagonist, a Muslim, who starts reciting them upon being attacked by his three Hindu wives. That scene in particular was perceived as offensive, as was the portrayal of Muslims as radicalists. The Central Board of Film Certification had objected to this scene and had directed Bokadia to remove it.

This direction was challenged by Bokadia before the Bombay High Court. Initially, Bokadia had claimed hat he would not remove this scene and the concerned line of dialogue at any cost. Finally during a hearing before the Court, he agreed to replace the words with another line "Tumko Tumhare Bhagwan Ki Kasam", after which the High Court agreed to pass the film for release.

In an interview, the director, in order to refute the accusations of stereotypical portrayal of Muslims and religious bias, has stated that his film had been inspired by a true event.

== Reception ==
In his review for News18, Pratik Shekhar praised the actors' performances in the film.
