= Marathwada Mitra Mandal College of Commerce =

Marathwada Mitra Mandal's College of Commerce popularly known as MMCC is a college in Deccan Gymkhana Pune. It is one of the leading colleges in the city offers B.Com, BBA, BBA IB,BBA(CA), B.Sc Computer Science, M.Com and M.A Journalism and Mass Communication (Postgraduate course).

== History ==
Marathwada Mitra Mandal, Pune is a charitable trust registered under the Bombay Public Trust Act 1950. Shri.

In July, 1985 the trust founded the College of Architecture with the B.Arch course. In the same year, the trust also founded the school of Interior Designing. In 1986, the Commerce college was founded. The Commerce college is steadily growing and producing outstanding academic results. The college is affiliated to the Savitribai Phule Pune University.

== Awards ==
It was presented the "Best College" award by the University under its Quality Improvement Programme in 2009. Best College Magazine Award by SPPU Best Sports Director Award Best NSS Nodal Officer Best Nodal officer of Electoral Literacy Club Dr Punam Shinde from Commerce department.(2023-2024)

== Academics ==
It offers B.Com, M.Com, Master of Arts Masters in Journalism & Mass Communication, Post Graduate Course in Banking and Finance and Post Graduate Diploma in Foreign Trade along with BBA and BBM-IB programs. The college also offers BSc Computer Science and BCA courses. The college was one of the first in the city to offer the BBA program.

== Campus ==
Apart from the Commerce college, the campus houses the Institute of Management, Education, Research and Training offering the MBA and MPM programs. It is also home to the Shankarrao Chavan Law College.

The campus has

- Library
- Hostel
- Computer Lab
- Assembly hall
- Gymnasium

== Recognition ==
The college once secured 4th place in a Top 5 colleges survey conducted by India Today. It has been accredited by NAAC with an 'A' grade.

MMCC initiated Anemia Free Campus initiative in 2024 in association with an NGO.

== Sister institutes ==
The trust has institutes for Law, Engineering, Pharmacy and Polytechnics.

This college also offers management courses

== Notable members and alumni ==
The trust was founded by Shankarrao Chavan and a few other members like S.M. Garge, and S.B. Jadhav. Former chief minister of Maharashtra, Vilasrao Deshmukh was the president of the trust. Amruta Khanvilkar, Mugdha Godse, Atharva Sudame and Dnyanada Ramtirthkar graduated from this college.
