= Kaagaz Ke Fools =

- Directed by: Anil Kumar Chaudhary
- Written by: Faisal Kapadia; Arun Bhairav
- Screenplay by: Faisal Kapadia; Arun Bhairav
- Produced by: Faisal Kapadia; Arun Bhairav
- Starring: Vinay Pathak; Mugdha Godse; Raima Sen; Saurabh Shukla; Rajendra Sethi; Amit Behl; Nishikant Dixit
- Cinematography: Aniket Khandagale
- Music by: Various Artists
- Production company: Globe Filmy Entertainment
- Distributed by: Globe Filmy Entertainment
- Release date: 24 April 2015
- Running time: 109 minutes
- Country: India
- Language: Hindi

Kaagaz Ke Fools (transl. Fools of paper) is a 2015 Indian comedy film directed by Anil Kumar Chaudhary and produced by Faisal Kapadia and Arun Bhairav under the Globe Filmy Entertainment banner. The film was released on 24 April 2015.

== Cast ==
- Vinay Pathak as Purushottam Tripathi
- Mugdha Godse as Nikki Tripathi
- Raima Sen as Rubina
- Saurabh Shukla as Dev
- Rajendra Sethi as Kuku
- Amit Behl as Vinay
- Nishikant Dixit as Inspector

== Plot ==
Revolving around a middle-class family, Kaagaz Ke Fools touches upon the issue of lack of good novel writers.

== Production ==
The title is a pun of the 1959 film Kaagaz Ke Phool.

== Reception ==
=== Critical response ===
Kaagaz Ke Fools received generally negative reviews from critics. The film is one of the worst movie of 2015. Shubhra Gupta of The Indian Express stated, "You keep wanting this film to ‘ho ja shuru’, but ‘Kaagaz Ke Fools’ doesn't have the feet for it."

=== Ratings ===
Sushmita Murthy of Deccan Chronicle gave the film 1/5 stars and stated, "The name of the film leads you to believe that Kaagaz ke Fools is a comedy, but it is at best, an attempt at it with rather painful results."

Shubha Shetty-Saha of Mid-Day giving the same ratings stated, "The 1959 Guru Dutt classic 'Kaagaz Ke Phool' was so ahead of its time that it tanked at the Box Office, and later got elevated to world cult classic status. Ironically, and perhaps reflecting the sad state of Bollywood’s growth, in 2015 we get a film titled 'Kaagaz ke Fools', which is so regressive and dated that it just might have made some sense back in the 50s. Well, if nothing, the film makes us painfully aware of the difference between a phool and a fool."

== Soundtrack ==
The soundtrack for the album was composed by Sangeeta Pant and lyrics were written by Sangeeta Pant, Ravi Basnet.

No.	Title	Singers(s)	Length
1.	"Lafda Pai Gaya"	Tochi Raina	4:33
2.	"Nasha"	Sangeeta Pant	3:33
3.	"Sharari Rampaa"	Shaan, Sangeeta Pant	2:39
Total length:			10:45
