= Peter Rost (doctor) =

Swedish whistleblower

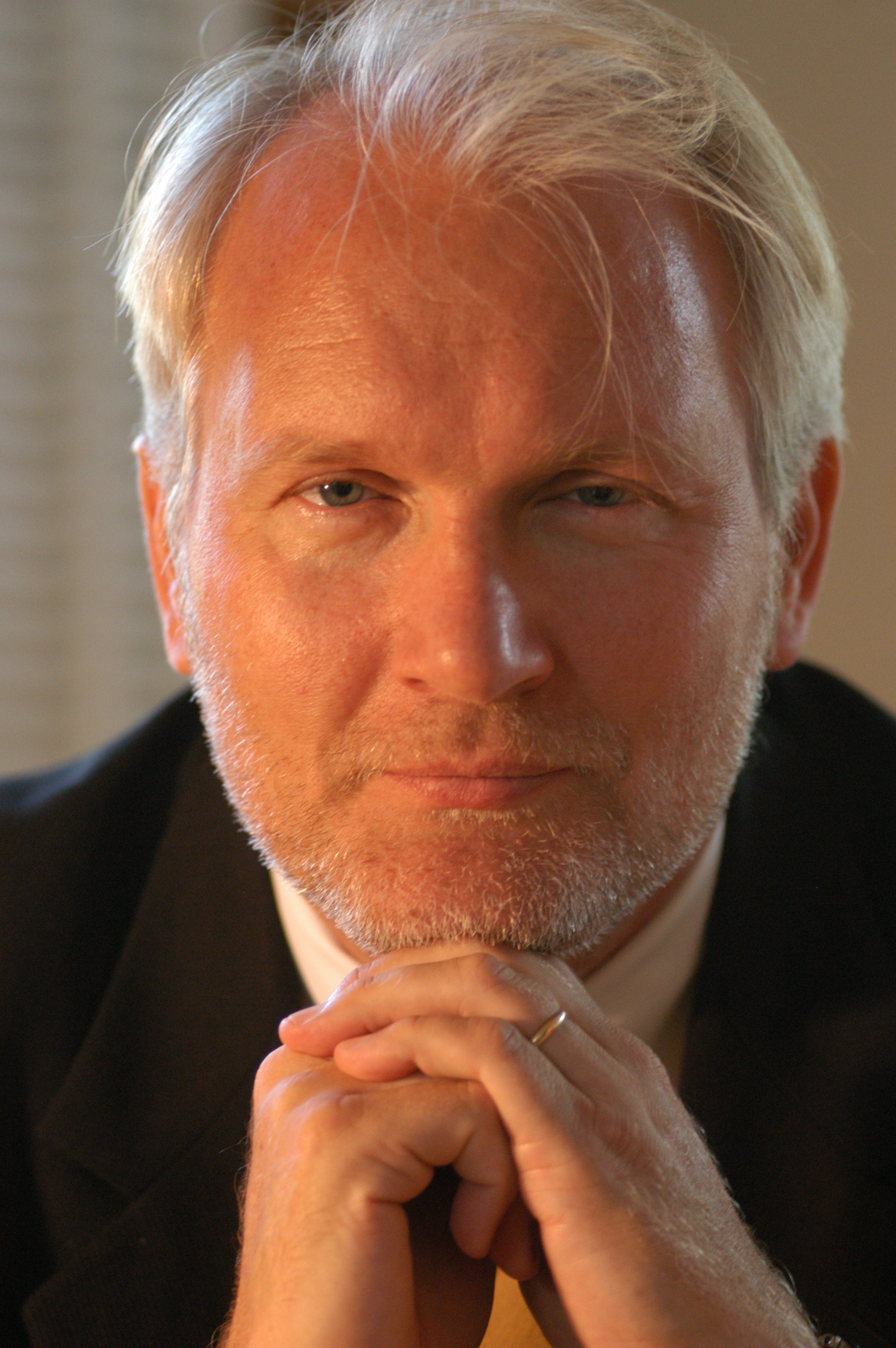
- Born: 1959

Peter Rost is an American former drug marketing executive who is most known for taking public stances critical of the pharmaceutical industry as an "insider" and whistleblower. He sued his last two pharmaceutical employers, Wyeth and Pfizer, the latter of which fired him in 2005. At Wyeth, he uncovered tax evasion practices, and after informing senior company executives, was transferred from Sweden to a post in New Jersey. Rost sued the company, saying that the transfer was a retaliatory demotion, though the company said it was a promotion. Rost settled with Wyeth for an undisclosed amount in 2003. At Pfizer, Rost filed a qui tam suit disclosing off-label marketing of Genotropin at Pharmacia prior to its purchase by Pfizer. The U.S. Department of Justice declined to join in Rost's suit as the marketing violations had already been disclosed to the Department by Pfizer. Rost was eventually fired by Pfizer, and sued for wrongful dismissal. In 2013 Pfizer, the Department of Justice, and Rost settled on undisclosed terms. Rost then worked as a public speaker, author, and litigation consultant.

== Biography ==
Rost worked at medical advertising agencies prior to working for pharmaceutical companies.

Rost started working at Wyeth in approximately 1992; seven years after joining Wyeth, he was promoted to head of Wyeth-Lederle Nordiska, Wyeth's Scandinavian subsidiary. Rost has said that he doubled sales during his tenure. He became concerned about Wyeth's accounting practices and informed upper management of his concerns. Shortly thereafter, he was transferred from Sweden to New Jersey, a move he characterized as a retaliatory demotion. He filed a lawsuit against Wyeth, which was settled out of court for undisclosed terms.

Rost left Wyeth for Pharmacia in June 2001 and took a role leading its endocrinology division, and said that he soon began to be concerned from a business perspective about sales of Genotropin, Pfizer's human growth hormone drug, which had plateaued; Pharmacia's decision to pour money into off-label marketing to adults was not paying off, due to the low doses that adults took. In the next year, Rost became aware that the strategy was not only unwise, but was probably illegal, and began raising objections internally to try to get the company to change course. In July 2002 merger discussions with Pfizer were announced, and Rost and other executives briefed the Pfizer acquisition team on the issues with Genotropin as the merger talks progressed. However, when news broke in January 2003 of Rost's lawsuits against Wyeth (see below), things turned sour; Rost reported getting an email from his future Pfizer boss saying "There will not be a fit with the marketing organization" for him. The merger with Pfizer was completed in April 2003. Rost was offered a severance package, as other Pharmacia executives were, but Pfizer and Rost failed to come to agreement, and Pfizer did not fire him, as they were aware of the suit he filed against them related to Genotropin marketing (see below). His staff of 60 was slowly reassigned and by the end of summer 2003, he was left with his administrative assistant, who was reassigned in the summer of 2004, and his office was moved to an out of the way location.

In August 2004, Rost posted a glowing review of Marcia Angell's book, The Truth About the Drug Companies: How They Deceive Us and What to Do About It on amazon.com. The review was noticed by a reporter at USA Today, which interviewed him for an article on the drug industry. The public spotlight from the USA Today article "changed Rost's life" and launched his new career as an insider critical of the drug industry.

In September 2004, Rost testified at a Congressional hearing over the reimportation of drugs, in which he stated that "Holding up a vote on importation, stopping good importation bills has a high, high cost not just in money, but in American lives. Every day we delay, Americans die because they cannot afford life-saving drugs." Pfizer responded by sending a letter to Congress that said, "Dr. Rost has no qualifications to speak on importation, no responsibilities in this area at Pfizer, no knowledge of the information and analysis Pfizer has provided to the government on this issue, and no substantive grasp of how importation may impact the safety of this nation's drug supply." Rost followed up that testimony with an opinion piece published by The New York Times. In mid-2005, Rost appeared on a 60 Minutes segment about drug pricing.

In late 2005, Rost's lawsuit against Pfizer under the False Claims Act was unsealed (see below) and in December 2005, Pfizer fired him. At Pfizer, Rost had made $600,000 per year for "by his own account, doing essentially no work". Rost filed an unlawful termination suit against Pfizer that was summarily dismissed. The court ruled that the evidence showed Pfizer had decided to fire Rost prior to learning of his whistleblowing activities. According to Pfizer, Rost's public criticism came only after he asked for and was denied a $10M severance package.

Rost started blogging at The Huffington Post, but was banned in June 2006, after he got into a tiff with a heckler on his blog, who turned out to be on the Post's technical staff. Arianna Huffington said, "It seemed like his blog was becoming about personal grudges. That would have been no problem if the posts were interesting."

In September 2006, Rost's book, The Whistleblower, Confessions of a Healthcare Hitman, was published, which described his tenure at Pharmacia and Pfizer and his efforts to deal with the marketing of Genotropin. In 2007, he published Killer Drug, a novel about a fictional drug company that develops a biological weapon for the military.

In August 2007, Rost started to write a daily blog for BrandweekNRX and a column for Realtid, a Swedish online business newspaper. Later in 2007, Rost announced his new business venture, as a Pharmaceutical Marketing Expert Witness.

Rost was featured in the award-winning documentary film Fire in the Blood in 2013.

== Litigation ==
In January 2003, The New York Times published an article describing a whistleblowing lawsuit Rost had filed against Wyeth, claiming that Wyeth had practiced tax and compensation fraud worldwide, and describing Rost's separate lawsuit against Wyeth for removing him from heading a staff of 125 Wyeth-Lederle Nordiska to heading a group of eight people in New Jersey, which Rost described as a retaliatory demotion and Wyeth described as a promotion. Later in 2003, Wyeth settled the whistleblowing lawsuit for an undisclosed amount.

In June 2003, Rost filed a case under the False Claims Act (FCA) against Pfizer, claiming that Pharmacia defrauded the government by causing false claims to be filed, due to Pharmacia's illegal off-label marketing of Genotropin. The case was unsealed in November 2005, and the Department of Justice declined to intervene, leaving Rost to litigate on his own. Unbeknownst to Rost, Pfizer had already disclosed the off-label marketing effort at Pharmacia to the Department of Justice and fired the responsible parties. After Pfizer fired him in December 2005, Rost filed a wrongful termination lawsuit, while Pfizer said that they had planned to eliminate his position due to redundancies from the merger in 2003, but that they had kept him because they were aware of the FCA suit he had filed. Pfizer also said that they had informed the FDA of Pharmacia's marketing and kickback practices two weeks prior to Rost filing his FCA lawsuit and that they could not do so earlier due to securities laws related to the Pharmacia merger; they also said that government's decision not to intervene supported their contention that the lawsuit was baseless. The judge presiding over Rost's wrongful termination lawsuit ruled that the evidence showed Pfizer's version of events to be correct.

Rost's FCA lawsuit was dismissed in September 2006 for failing to show that Pharmacia's marketing and kickbacks generated fraudulent claims to be submitted to the US Government; Rost appealed.

On April 2, 2007, Pfizer and the Department of Justice, which had been conducting its own investigations focused on kickbacks and illegal off-label marketing (not fraud), announced that two Pharmacia subsidiaries had pleaded guilty and agreed to pay at total of $34.7 million in civil and criminal penalties for kickbacks and illegally promoting its human growth hormone drug, Genotropin. One subsidiary had offered to overpay a subsidiary of a pharmacy benefit manager, Express Scripts, by $12.3 million to induce it recommend Genotropin over other forms of HGH; the other marketed Genotropin off-label for uses in antiaging, cosmetics, and athletic performance. The DOJ press release praised Pfizer for bringing the matters to the DOJ's attention shortly after the acquisition of Pharmacia.

In November 2007, Rost won his appeal of his FCA case, and the case was sent back to district court, where in September 2010 the judge again dismissed his claims as not proving fraud against the federal government. Rost appealed again, but withdrew his appeal in August 2013 when Pfizer, the Department of Justice, and Rost settled on undisclosed terms.
