= Vijaybhoomi University =

Private university in Raigad, India

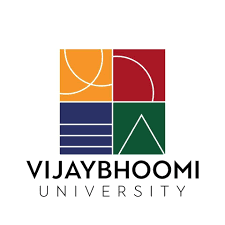
- Type: Private
- Established: 2018
- Affiliations: UGC
- President: Sanjay Padode
- Location: Karjat, Maharashtra, 410210, India; 19.020641°N 73.522448°E
- Campus: 53 Acres
- Website: http://vijaybhoomi.edu.in/

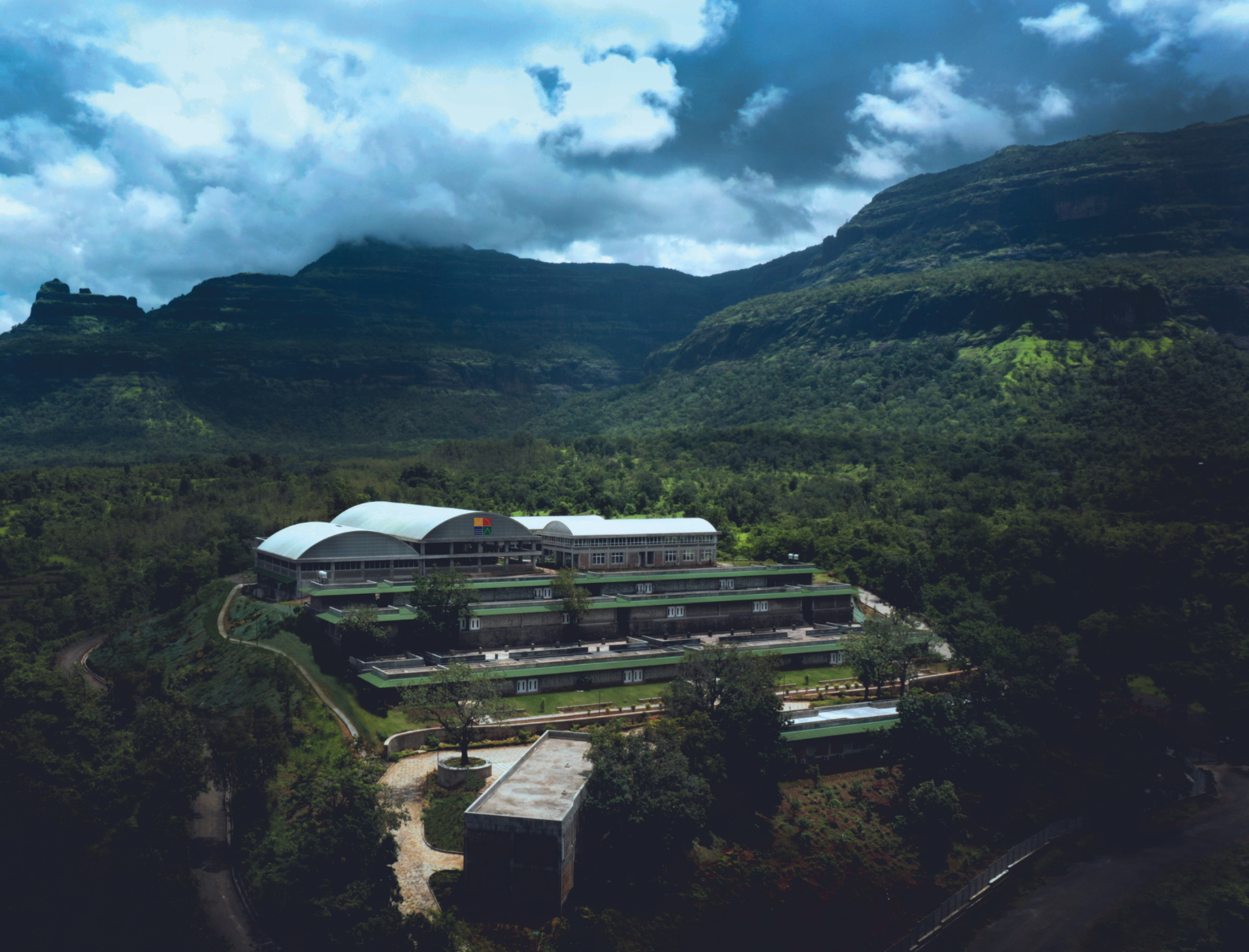
53 Acres Green VU Campus, Karjat

The Vijaybhoomi University (VU) is a private, liberal professional university based in Karjat, Maharashtra, India, established in 2018 under the Vijaybhoomi University Act passed by the Government of Maharashtra. It is recognized by the UGC and aims to blend liberal education with professional degrees in management, design, technology, law, and music.

== Campus ==
VU's 53-acre residential campus is located in the foothills of the Western Ghats, approximately 60 km from Mumbai. It includes design labs, recording studios, moot courts, digital classrooms, and sports facilities.

== Constituent Schools ==
Vijaybhoomi University consists of:

- Jagdish Sheth School of Management (JAGSoM)
- Vijaybhoomi School of Law
- Vijaybhoomi School of Science & Technology
- Vijaybhoomi School of Design
- The True School of Music

== Programs ==
=== Undergraduate ===
Program	Degree	Duration	School
BBA	BBA (General / Hons / Hons with Research)	3–4 years	JAGSoM
BBA in Accounting & Finance (KPMG in India Co-designed)	BBA (Hons / Research)	4 years	JAGSoM
Integrated BBA + MBA	BBA + MBA	5 years	JAGSoM
BBA LL.B (Hons)	Law + Business	5 years	School of Law
BFA (Music Production)	BFA (Hons)	3–4 years	True School of Music
BPA (Contemporary Performance)	BPA (Hons)	3–4 years	True School of Music
BPA (Hindustani Classical – Vocals)	BPA (Hons)	3–4 years	True School of Music
B.Tech in Sound Engineering	B.Tech	4 years	True School of Music
B.Des	Bachelor of Design (Hons)	4 years	School of Design
B.Tech (Artificial Intelligence)	B.Tech	4 years	School of Science & Tech
B.Tech (CSE – AI Major)	B.Tech	4 years	School of Science & Tech

=== Postgraduate ===
- **MBA** (JAGSoM) – 2 years

== Admission ==
Admissions are based on performance in national entrance exams and the university’s internal process (VUSAT + Personal Interview).

UG accepted scores: VUSAT, JEE, CUET, SAT, IPMAT, CLAT, LSAT, UCEED, NID-DAT, MHT-CET PG accepted scores: CAT, XAT, GMAT, CMAT, NMAT, JAGMAT

== Scholarships ==
VU offers scholarships and grants based on merit, domicile, gender, and performance:

- 100% waiver for EWS and armed forces martyrs’ wards
- 50% waiver for Maharashtra domicile students
- 50% waiver for national/state athletes or performers
- 25% waiver for children of armed forces (serving/retired)
- Girl student grant (10% fee rebate)

== Rankings ==
- **AACSB Accredited** (JAGSoM) – one of the 15 such institutions in India
- **QS Global Business Rankings 2025** – JAGSoM ranked in 101+ band for PGDM (Marketing & Analytics), 151+ for Finance

== Accreditation ==
Vijaybhoomi University is recognized by the UGC.
