= Jamie Love (activist) =

British businessman, model, and LGBTQ activist

- Born: February 1995 (age 31); Italy
- Occupation: Entrepreneur

Jamie Love (born February 1995) is a British entrepreneur, model and LGBT activist. He is the founder and CEO of Monumental Marketing, a marketing agency based in London, UK.

== Early years ==
Love is of Scottish and Italian descent. He was born in 1995 to Andrew and Giuliana. The family moved to Bahrain after Andrew got a job there and Love studied at the British School of Bahrain. After studying five years at the British School of Bahrain, Love moved to Edinburgh.

== Business career ==
Love began his career from the hospitality sector and started his first business called JLUK, after moving to Edinburgh. Later, he moved to London and started working in digital marketing for a fitness company. Love established Monumental Marketing in September 2017. The company focuses on digital marketing and growth marketing. As of March 2019, the company has multiplied its revenue 10 times in the past 12 months. It was named the UK's Best Growth Marketing Agency 2020 at the Business Excellence Awards.

Love is an LGBT activist. He is the marketing director and executive producer for Pride Edinburgh, an LGBT Pride event.

== Recognition ==
He is former Mr Gay Scotland 2016, but was asked to return his sash after he refused to compete for the title of Mr Gay Europe.
