= Salaam Kashmier =

2014 Indian film

- Directed by: Joshiy
- Written by: Sethu
- Story by: Shaiju Anthikkad
- Produced by: Maha Subair
- Starring: Suresh Gopi; Jayaram; Miya; Lalu Alex; Krishna Kumar; Junaid Sheikh
- Cinematography: Manoj Pillai
- Edited by: Shyam Sasidharan
- Music by: M. Jayachandran (songs); C. Rajamani (score)
- Production company: Varnachithra Big Screen
- Distributed by: Varnachithra Release
- Release date: 13 February 2014
- Running time: 160 minutes
- Country: India
- Language: Malayalam

Salaam Kashmier (transl. Salute Kashmir) is a 2014 Indian Malayalam-language action comedy film directed by Joshiy and written by Sethu from a story by Shaiju Anthikkad. It was produced by Mahaa Subair. The film stars Suresh Gopi, Jayaram and Miya in lead roles. Alongside Lalu Alex, Krishna Kumar, Junaid Sheikh, Vijayaraghavan. The songs were composed by M. Jayachandran, while C. Rajamani provided the background score.

== Plot ==
Sreekumar (Jayaram) is a simple, loving husband who manages household chores while his wife, Suja Sreekumar (Mia George), works as a bank manager. Though their marriage appears normal, there are hints that Suja is hiding something. At the same time, Sreekumar himself seems to be running from his past, unwilling to discuss his previous life.

One day, the arrival of Colonel Tomy Eapen Devassy (Suresh Gopi) shatters their peaceful life. Tomy, a high-ranking military officer, seems to know Sreekumar well and tries to get him back to his old life. As the film progresses, we learn that Sreekumar was once a highly skilled military officer who was forced to abandon his duty and live under a new identity.

The Big Revelation: Who is Suja Sreekumar?

As Sreekumar's past starts to catch up with him, another shocking truth is unveiled: Suja Sreekumar was once known as Leena Jacob. She, too, has a hidden past—one that she never shared with her husband. Whether she was connected to the military or involved in some other classified mission is left for the story to explore.

Now, with both Sreekumar and Suja hiding their true identities, their relationship is tested. Meanwhile, their enemies begin closing in, threatening their peaceful life.

The Climax

Forced to confront their pasts, Sreekumar and Suja must work together to escape the dangers that come their way. In an action-packed climax, Sreekumar finally embraces his old self and takes down the threats, proving why he was once a legendary officer. Suja/Leena, too, reveals her real self, showing that she is not just an ordinary bank manager.

The movie ends with both of them accepting each other's past, realizing that they were both living a lie, yet found true love in the process.

== Cast ==
- Suresh Gopi as Lt. Colonel Tomy Eepan Devasy, Indian Army officer, Leena's brother and Sreekumar's brother-law
- Jayaram as Major Sreekumar, commanding officer of Indian Military Cyber Intelligence Wing
- Miya as Suja Sreekumar/Leena Jacob, Sreekumar's wife and Tomy's younger sister
- Lalu Alex as Roy, Tomy's friend in Kerala
- Junaid Sheikh as Junaid, Terrorist Leader
- Vijayaraghavan as Philip
- Krishna Kumar as Captain Satheesh, Sreekumar's co-worker at Army
- Bharathiraja as Muthumanivannan
- Anoop Chandran as Madhavan
- Vaigha Rose as Captain Kaur
- Ponnamma Babu as Lakshmi Kurup
- P. Sreekumar as Kurup
- Valsala Menon as Valyammachi
- Baiju Jose as Rameshan
- Ravi Mariya as Muthuvel
- S.P.Sreekumar as Vinu
- Krishna Praba as Chandran's wife
- Saiju Kurup as Joy Varghese
- Archana Menon as Rosamma Roy
- Mini Arun as Santhamma
- Gayathri Varsha as Ramani
- Bindu Varappuzha as Treesa
- Anjana Appukuttan
- Shalini Sivaraman
- Sanika raghawa as mamtha
- Kottayam Manju

}}

== Production ==
The film marks the comeback of Suresh Gopi after a hiatus of two years. He plays the role of a typical Nasrani from Pala, Kottayam.

== Soundtrack ==
The songs were composed by M. Jayachandran, with lyrics by Rafeeq Ahmed. The background score was composed by C. Rajamani.

=== Track listing ===
No.	Title	Singer(s)	Length
1.	"Kannaadi"	Jayaram, Swetha Mohan	04:00
2.	"Kashmirile Rojapoove"	M. Jayachandran	03:58

== Release ==
Salaam Kashmier was released in theatres on 13 February 2014. The film was originally scheduled for release on 25 November 2013, but it was postponed due to a delay in obtaining a no-objection certificate (NOC) from the Indian Army. It is common practice for films with military themes to secure an NOC after being reviewed by military intelligence officers.
