= Zarina Wahab =

Indian actress

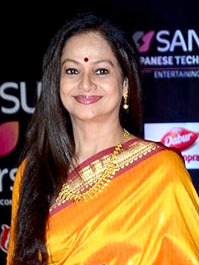
- Zarina Wahab in 2016
- Born: Visakhapatnam, Andhra Pradesh, India
- Occupation: Actress
- Years active: 1974–present
- Spouse: Aditya Pancholi (m. 1986)
- Children: 2; including Sooraj Pancholi

Zarina Wahab is an Indian actress who predominantly worked in Hindi and Malayalam films. Known for critically acclaimed roles in Chitchor and Gopal Krishna in Hindi cinema and Malayalam films like Madanolsavam, Chamaram, Palangal and Adaminte Makan Abu.

== Early life and education ==
Wahab was born in Visakhapatnam. She is fluent in her mother tongue Telugu, in addition to Urdu, Hindi and English. She was trained at Film and Television Institute of India (FTII), Pune.

== Career ==
After receiving negative feedback about her appearance from film producer Raj Kapoor, Wahab worked on her appearance and attended film parties and events. She eventually got noticed and was cast in films. She was usually cast as the middle-class girl after her first leading role in Basu Chatterjee's Chit Chor (1976) in movies like Agar, Jazbaat, Sawan Ko Aane Do, and Raees Zada. She was nominated for a Filmfare Award in the Best Actress category for Gharonda (1977). She has acted in many Malayalam, Telugu, Tamil, films. Wahab made a comeback to Malayalam films with Calendar, in 2009 and has continued to act in Malayalam movies. She is still remembered for her role in the critically acclaimed Adaminte Makan Abu. She also appeared in My Name Is Khan as the mother of Rizwan Khan (Shah Rukh Khan's character). Wahab currently plays older roles in television serials.

In 2026, she appeared in a Mmuslim social drama Teesri Begum.

== Personal life ==
Wahab met actor Aditya Pancholi on the sets of Kalank Ka Tika. They married in 1986 and have a daughter, Sana and a son, Sooraj. News of their turbulent marriage, her husband's temper and rumours of infidelity have been in the gossip columns. Wahab's daughter is an actress. Her son, Sooraj, was arrested in June 2013, in connection with the death of Jiah Khan. He made his Bollywood debut with Sunil Shetty's daughter Athiya Shetty in 2015 in the movie Hero.

In 2024, she defended her husband and her son during controversies.

== Filmography ==
=== Feature films ===
List of Zarina Wahab film credits
Year	Title	Role	Language	Notes
1974	Ishq Ishq Ishq	Prema	Hindi	
1975	Anokha	Sudha Manchanda	Hindi	
1975	Gajula Kishtayya	Radha	Telugu	
1976	Chitchor	Geeta P. Choudry	Hindi	
1976	Raeeszada	Julie	Hindi	
1977	Gharaonda	Chaya	Hindi	
1977	Navarathinam	Pushparagam,	Tamil	
1977	Agar... If	Anju Agarwal	Hindi	
1978	Tumhare Liye	Rajnartaki	Hindi	
1978	Madanolsavam	Elizabeth	Malayalam	
1978	Anpadh	Jyoti	Hindi	
1978	Amara Prema	Jaya Mala	Telugu	
1978	Tumhare Liye	Rajnartaki	Hindi	
1979	Gopal Krishna	Radha	Hindi	
1979	Jeena Yahan	Sushma	Hindi	Guest appearance
1979	Salaam Memsaab	Radha	Hindi	
1979	Sawan Ko Aane Do	Chandramukhi	Hindi	
1979	Naiyya	Geeta	Hindi	
1979	Do Hawaldar	Paro	Hindi	
1980	Chamaram	Indu	Malayalam	
1980	Naayattu	Bhavani	Malayalam	
1980	Swattu	Rohini	Malayalam	
1980	Mr. Michael	Lilly	Malayalam	
1980	Prathishta		Malayalam	
1980	Pappu	Herself	Malayalam	Cameo
1980	Sitara	Dhaniya/Sarita	Hindi	
1980	Aakhri Insaaf		Hindi	
1980	Taxi Chor	Ruby	Hindi	
1980	Hema Hemeelu	Seeta	Telugu	
1980	Jazbaat	Sapna/Sangeeta	Hindi	
1981	Ek Aur Ek Gyarah	Hirnibai	Hindi	
1981	Roohi	Sajjo/Roohi	Hindi	
1981	Aakhri Mujra	Sitara	Hindi	
1981	Paanch Qaidi	Shanti	Hindi	
1981	Khoon Ki Takkar	Rajju	Hindi	
1981	Ammakkorumma	Sindhu	Malayalam	
1981	Palangal	Usha	Malayalam	
1982	Sara Varsham	Savitha	Malayalam	
1982	Enthino Pookunna Pookal	Savithri	Malayalam	
1982	Football	Celine	Malayalam	
1982	Veedu	Sumi	Malayalam	
1982	Barrister		Hindi	
1982	Tadap	Shaila	Hindi	
1982	Maine Jeena Seekh Liya	Reema	Hindi	
1982	Shiv Charan	Bijili	Hindi	
1982	Karwat		Hindi	
1983	Kaivarisai	Jaisankar's sister	Tamil	
1983	Dard-E-Dil	Reshma	Hindi	
1983	Chor Police	Anjana	Hindi	
1983	Paanchwin Manzil	Meena	Hindi	
1983	Lal Chunariyaa	Kamini	Hindi	
1983	Parasparam	Meera	Malayalam	
1984	Hanste Khelte	Meena	Hindi	
1984	Manasariyathe	Sindhu	Malayalam	
1985	Punnaram Cholli Cholli	Vinodini	Malayalam	
1985	Choodatha Pookal	Sreedevi	Malayalam	
1985	Hum Naujawan	Meenakshi	Hindi	
1986	Amrit	Savitri Sharma	Hindi	
1986	Adhikar	Rita	Hindi	
1986	Inteqam Ki Aag	Seema	Hindi	
1986	Dahleez	Jameela Ali	Hindi	
1987	Ee Bandha Anubandha		Kannada	
1987	Maashuka		Hindi	
1987	Dozakh	Dancer	Hindi	
1987	Mera Yaar Mera Dushman		Hindi	
1989	Toofan	Mrs. Laxmi Gopal Sharma	Hindi	
1992	Jai Kaali	Divya	Hindi	
1995	Mera Damad	Kimi/Sunita Choudhry	Hindi	
2001	Zindagi	Geeta	Hindi	
2004	Dil Maange More!!!	Kavita	Hindi	
2005	Kisna: The Warrior Poet	Shanta	Hindi	
2006	Jaane Hoga Kya	Mrs. Krishnan	Hindi	
2006	Prateeksha	Kunti	Hindi	
2007	Kaisay Kahein	Mrs. Rao	Hindi	
2008	Kabadi Kabadi		Malayalam	
2009	Calendar	Thankam Joseph	Malayalam	
2010	Aagathan	Malathi Varma	Malayalam	
2010	My Name Is Khan	Razia Khan	Hindi	
2010	Rakta Charitra	Jayalakshmi	Hindi	
2010	Rakta Charitra	Jayalakshmi	Telugu	
2010	Rakta Charitra 2	Jayalakshmi	Hindi	
2010	Rakta Charitra 2	Jayalakshmi	Telugu	
2010	Khilafath		Malayalam	
2010	Malik Ek	Shanti	Hindi	
2011	Adaminte Makan Abu	Aishumma	Malayalam	
2011	Naayika	Herself	Malayalam	Cameo
2012	Agneepath	Suhasini Chauhan	Hindi	
2013	I, Me, aur Main	Nisha Sabharwal	Hindi	
2013	Himmatwala	Savitri	Hindi	
2013	Vishwaroopam	Psychiatrist	Tamil	
2013	Aaru Sundarimaarude Katha	Chachi Moothedan	Malayalam	
2013	Olipporu	Olipporali's mother	Malayalam	
2013	Club 60	Mrs. Sinha	Hindi	
2013	Zila Ghaziabad	Satbeer's mother	Hindi	
2014	Bobby Jasoos	Saida	Hindi	
2014	Love U Crazy Girl	Khushi's mother	Hindi	
2015	Dil Dhadakne Do	Smita Sangha	Hindi	
2016	Chalk n Duster	Indu Shastry	Hindi	
2016	Yea Toh Two Much Ho Gayaa	Mann's mother	Hindi	
2016	Anbendraale Amma	Mother	Tamil	Short film
2017	Viswasapoorvam Mansoor	Sairabanu	Malayalam	
2017	Thrissivaperoor Kliptham	Ammachi	Malayalam	
2017	Jia Aur Jia	Jia Grewal's mother	Hindi	
2017	The Door	Mother	Hindi	
2019	Minnaminukalude Aakasham		Malayalam	
2019	The Last Meal	Mother	Hindi	
2019	And the Oscar Goes To...	Ummukulsu	Malayalam	
2019	Priyapettavar	Menon's mother	Malayalam	Photo only
2019	PM Narendra Modi	Hiraben Modi	Hindi	
2019	One Day: Justice Delivered	Abdul's mom	Hindi	
2019	Junction Varanasi	Mamta	Hindi	
2019	Mudda 370 J&K	Suraj's mother	Hindi	
2020	Mai Gayatri Jadhav	Lawyer	Hindi	
2020	Main Mulayam Singh Yadav	Mulayam's mother	Hindi	
2020	The Lovers	Nithya's mother	Hindi	
2020	The Waiting	Mehak	Hindi	
2020	Guns of Banaras	Guddu's mother	Hindi	
2020	Street Dancer 3D	Amrinder's mother	Hindi	
2021	Mera Fauji Calling	Maaji	Hindi	
2022	Before You Die		Hindi	
2022	Hero of Nation Chandra Shekhar Azad	Jagrani Devi	Hindi	
2022	Lalitham Sundaram	Mary Das	Malayalam	
2022	Virata Parvam	Ravi's mother	Telugu	
2022	Ishq Pashmina		Hindi	
2023	Lafzon Mein Pyaar	Devki	Hindi	
2023	Ajmer 92	Urmila	Hindi	
2023	The Purvanchal Files	Ritesh Pandey's mother	Hindi	
2024	Devara: Part 1	Devara's mother	Telugu	
2024	Manamey	Tony’s wife	Telugu	
2025	Jaat	Amma	Hindi	
2026	The RajaSaab	Gangamma	Telugu	
2026	Mana Shankara Vara Prasad Garu	Vara Prasad’s mother	Telugu	
2026	Dacoit: A Love Story	Juliet’s mother	Telugu	
2026	September 21	Sudha	Hindi; Kannada	
2026	Teesri Begum		Hindi	
2026	Vrushakarma †	TBA	Telugu	

=== Television series ===
Year	Serial	Role	Notes
1999	Naya Zamana	Dr.Shubhada Singh, Principal of college	
2000	Babul Ki Duwayen Leti Jaa	Prof Nafisa Siddiqui	
2000	Kyunki Saas Bhi Kabhi Bahu Thi	Tulsi's Childhood friend	
2001–2003	Heena	Nagma Begum	
2002–2004	Kammal	Rini Sanyaal	
2004–2005	Tumhari Disha	Suhasini Vijayendra Bhonsale	
2005	Kohinoor	Mrs Kohli, Iravati Mom	
2006–2007	Zaara	Sana Khan	
2006–2009	Kashmakash Zindagi Ki	Pooja's Mother	
2007–2008	Virrudh	Vasudha Mother	
2009–2010	Yahaaan Main Ghar Ghar Kheli	Pratibha Jagmohan Prasad	
2012	Savdhaan India	Rajjo	One Episode
2012	Sajda Tere Pyaar Mein	Mahendra Pratap Mother	
2012–2013	Madhubala Ek Ishq Ek Junoon	Meera Malik Sultan Mother	
2014	FIR	Bajrang Pandey's Mother	
2014	Zindagi Ek Bhanwar	Sharda Devi	
2016	Meri Awaaz Hi Pehchaan Hai	Ketki Gaikwad	

=== Web series ===
Year	Title	Role	Language	Network	Ref
2016	Love Life & Screw Ups	Honey	Hindi		
2022	Tanaav	Nabeela Riaz	Hindi	Sony Liv	
2023	Taj: Divided by Blood	Salima Sultan Begum	Hindi	Zee5	
2023	Tooth Pari: When Love Bites	Mamta	Hindi	Netflix	
2023	Kafas	Neelima	Hindi	Sony Liv	
2023	P I Meena	Chandana Dey	Hindi	Amazon Prime Video	
2024	Sir Syed Ahmad Khan: The Messiah	Azizunnisa Begum	Urdu	Apple TV	

== Awards and nominations ==
- Nominated–Filmfare Award for Best Actress (1977) for Gharonda
