= James Love (NGO director) =

Jamie Love
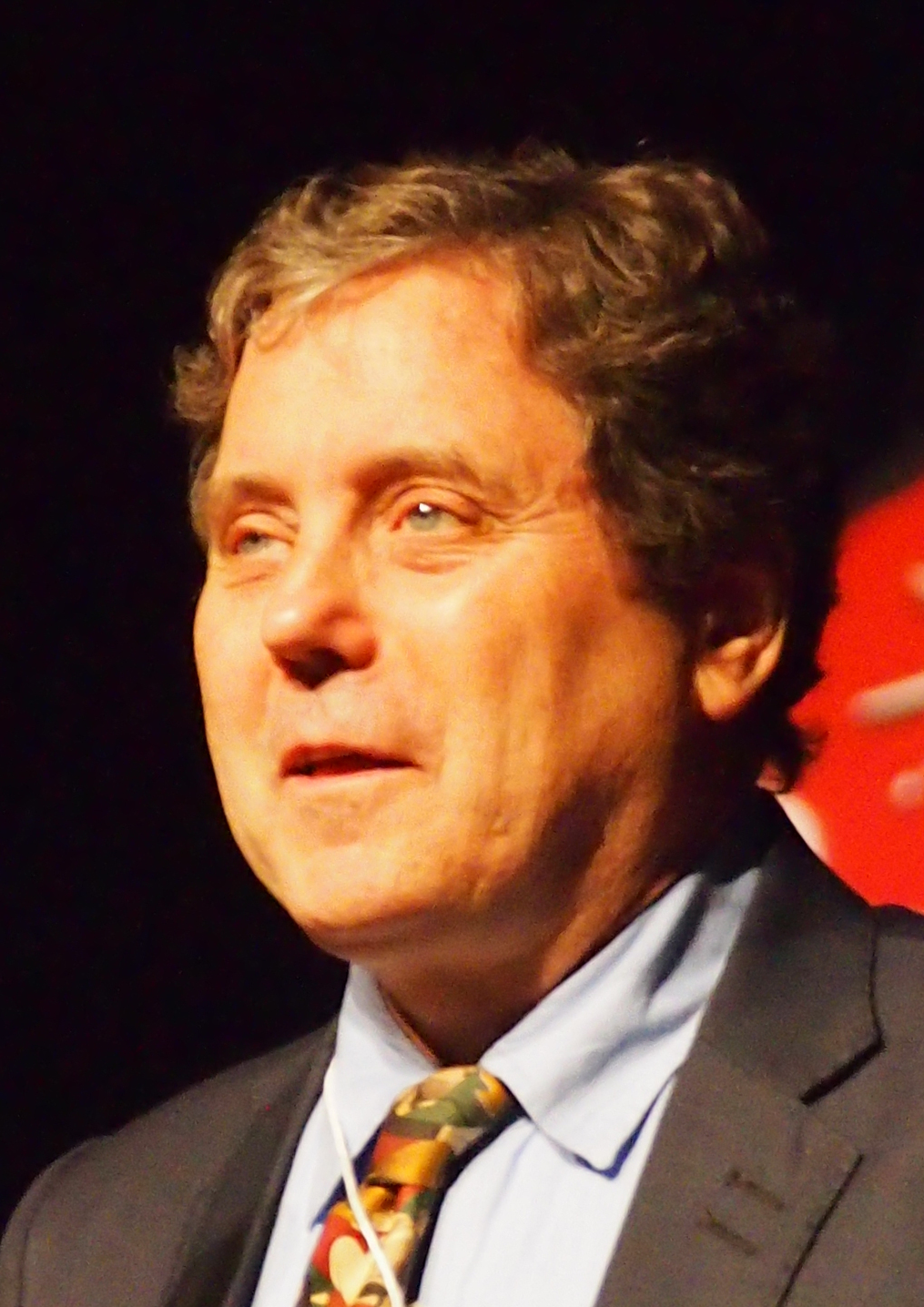
- Jamie Love, in 2016
- Born: James Packard Love; 1949 or 1950 (age 76–77)
- Education: Harvard Kennedy School; Woodrow Wilson School of Public and International Affairs
- Occupations: Director, Knowledge Ecology International
- Spouse: Manon Ress
- Children: 4

James Packard Love (born 1950) is the director of Knowledge Ecology International, formerly known as the Consumer Project on Technology, a non-governmental organization with offices in Washington, D.C., and Geneva, that works mainly on matters concerning knowledge management and governance, including intellectual property policy and practice and innovation policy, particularly as they relate to health care and access to knowledge.

An adviser to a number of United Nations agencies, national governments, international and regional intergovernmental organizations and public health NGOs, Love is US co-chair of the Trans Atlantic Consumer Dialogue Working Group on Intellectual Property, founder and chairman of Essential Inventions, Chairman of the Union for the Public Domain, Chairman of the Civil Society Coalition, and in the past has been a member of the MSF working groups on Intellectual Property and Research and Development, the Adelphi Charter on Creativity, Innovation and Intellectual Property and the Initiative for Policy Dialogue Task Force on Intellectual Property.

== Education and early career ==
Love was born in 1950 and grew up in Bellevue, Washington. After finishing high school, Love lived and worked in Alaska for 13 years, initially as a fish cannery worker. In 1974, he co-founded a non-profit organization, the Alaska Public Interest Research Group (AKPIRG), one of the Ralph Nader-inspired "PIRG"s that were forming around the country (primarily on college campuses) to pursue consumer and environmental causes. AKPIRG, however, was initiated under a different model, operating as a typical membership-based, off-campus organization. One of AKPIRG's first purposes was campaigning for oil companies to give part of their revenues to the community. (This effort eventually led to the establishment of the Alaska Permanent Fund.)

In 1980, Love left Alaska to return to school. He received a Masters of Public Administration from Harvard Kennedy School and a Masters in Public Affairs from the Princeton's Woodrow Wilson School of Public and International Affairs. He was then employed as an economist at the Frank Russell Company. He developed a return attribution system for the DEC pension fund, a portfolio reporting system for the IBM pension fund, and worked with the Ford Foundation to evaluate social investing by state investment funds.

== Public interest career ==
From 1990 to 2006, Love worked for Ralph Nader's Center for Study of Responsive Law, where among other things, he led an early effort to expand public access to U.S. government funded databases. One element of this involved the "Crown Jewels Campaign," which targeted public access to the most important and valuable federal databases, including those involving United States Securities and Exchange Commission filings, patents, bills pending before the Congress, medical abstracts and court opinions and statutes. In 1996, Love worked with Richard Stallman to create the Union for the Public Domain, which focused its attention on defeating a proposal at a WIPO diplomatic conference to adopt a treaty for the protection of non-copyrighted elements of databases.

In 1997, Love worked with Ralph Nader to push the U.S. Department of Justice to bring an antitrust case against Microsoft for anti-competitive conduct relating to web browsers and other software products running on Windows. Nader and Love later asked several computer manufacturers to offer consumers the choice of Linux or other operating systems, and pressed OMB to consider using its procurement power to require Microsoft and others to use open data formats.

In 1999, Love and several AIDS activists and public health group such as Médecins Sans Frontières (MSF), Health Action International (HAI) and Act Up launched a global campaign to promote the compulsory licensing of patents on medicines for AIDS and other illnesses.

In 2001, Love negotiated with Yusuf Hamied, head of Cipla, a leading Indian generic drug manufacturer, a $1 per day price for the AIDS treatment regime NVP+D4T+3TC. The "Cipla Offer" made headlines around the world and motivated Kofi Annan and others to call for the creation of the Global Fund for HIV, TB and malaria. The negotiations over the $1 per day AIDS drug price were the subject of a documentary film about access to AIDS drugs, Fire in the Blood. In November 2001, a Wall Street Journal editorial singled out the Consumer Project on Technology for pushing the World Trade Organization to adopt the Doha Declaration on TRIPS and Public Health.

In 2002, at the Barcelona International AIDS conference, Love called for the creation of a patent pool for patents on HIV and other essential medicines. In the fall of 2002, Tim Hubbard and Love participated in a radical scenario planning exercise organized by Aventis, the pharmaceutical and life sciences company, and developed proposals to eliminate legal monopolies on new medicines, and to expand support for open science projects. Among the Radical Pharma Scenario proposals were to replace intellectual property obligations in the WTO TRIPS accord and trade agreements with multilateral agreements on funding medical R&D, and to reform the incentive systems by replacing patent monopolies with cash prizes. In 2005, Representative Bernie Sanders introduced the first of several "Medical Innovation Prize Fund" bills designed to eliminate drug monopolies, one of the reforms coming out of the 2002 Aventis scenario sessions. The 2005 prize fund bill, which was drafted in 2004, would have created a large fund, set at 50 basis points of US GDP, to reward developers of new drugs, on the basis of "the incremental therapeutic benefit" of a product, benchmarked against existing therapies, subject to set asides in the fund for orphan drugs and national and global public health priorities. Love and Hubbard also proposed systems of "competitive intermediaries" to manage funding for open science projects. Working with artists and activists such as Ted Byfield, Alan Toner, and Jamie King, Love proposed the Blur/Banff model for supporting artists who recorded music.

In 2003, Love encouraged colleagues to consider the reform of WIPO, the UN specialized agency for intellectual property. In 2004, working with the TransAtlantic Consumer Dialogue (TACD), Love organized a meeting on access to knowledge for essential learning tools and on the future of WIPO. During this period, Love coined the term a2k, as a community brand for the Access for Knowledge movement that had been built out of the WIPO reform efforts.

Also in 2003, Love worked with several developing country governments, including Malaysia, Indonesia, Zambia and Mozambique on the granting of compulsory licenses on patents for antimalarial drugs. In 2003, the South Africa Competition Commission hired Love and the Consumer Project on Technology to evaluate a compulsory licensing request by Hazel Tau and the South Africa Treatment Access Campaign (TAC). The Competition Commission staff found that GSK and Boehringer were in violation of three sections of South Africa competition laws, leading to licenses on patents for several suppliers of generic AIDS drugs.

In 2004 and 2005, Love worked with Tim Hubbard and others on two separate initiatives to propose new treaty paradigms for intellectual property and innovation. The first was a proposal for a global treaty on medical research and development that would replace blinding norms on patents and other intellectual property rights for medicines. The second was a comprehensive access to knowledge treaty.

In 2005, Love authored a World Health Organization (WHO) and UNDP joint publication titled "Remuneration Guidelines for Non-Voluntary Use of a Patent". The 2005 Remuneration Guidelines introduced the Tiered Royalty Method (TRM), an approach that takes into account differences in incomes between countries, and sets royalties independent of the generic price of product.

In 2007, during discussions with MSF on a possible large prize for the development of a new low cost point of care diagnostic tool for tuberculosis, Love proposed an "open source dividend" mechanism to provide financial incentives to open source research. The open source dividend proposal would later be incorporated into other innovation inducement prize fund proposals.

In 2008, Love and KEI worked with the World Blind Union to convene a meeting to draft a possible treaty on copyright limitations and exceptions for persons who are blind, visually impaired or have other disabilities. (The treaty proposal was formerly tabled by the World Intellectual Property Organization in 2009.) A diplomatic conference led to the negotiation of the Marrakesh VIP Treaty in June 2013, now in global effect, having been ratified by over 50 countries including India (first to ratify), all of the European Union and the United States. Love's contribution to the treaty effort was recognized by the Electronic Frontier Foundation with their EFF Pioneer Award.

In 2012, a panel of the WHO recommended governments begin negotiation on a global treaty on medical R&D, incorporating such principals as the de-linkage of R&D costs from drug prices. The proposal was seen by some as a building block to the broader visions of reform set out in the 2002 Aventis scenario sessions. In 2012, Love gave evidence in a compulsory licensing proceeding in India involving patents held by Bayer on the cancer drug sorafenib (brand name Nexavar). The Nexavar case was the first compulsory license on a patent granted by India, following India's decision to join the World Trade Organization.

== Media ==
James Love's critical role in the battle for access to antiretroviral treatment in Africa and other parts of the global south is portrayed in the award-winning documentary Fire in the Blood (2013 film). He is also profiled in Rufus Pollock's book Open Revolution.

== Personal life ==
Love is married to fellow activist Manon Ress, and they have children from previous marriages and two children together.
