= Elements trilogy =

- Directed by: Deepa Mehta
- Written by: Deepa Mehta
- Produced by: Deepa Mehta
- Cinematography: Giles Nuttgens
- Edited by: Barry Farrell; Colin Monie
- Music by: A.R. Rahman; Mychael Danna
- Production company: Deepa Mehta Films
- Countries: Canada; India
- Languages: Hindi; English

The Elements trilogy of films by Indo-Canadian filmmaker Deepa Mehta deals with controversial issues of social reform on the Indian subcontinent. Fire, the first release in 1996, dealt with issues of arranged marriage and homosexuality in the patriarchal culture of India. Earth, released in 1998, dealt with the religious strife associated with the partition of India and the formation of Pakistan in the mid-20th century. Water, released in 2005, was the most critically successful of the three, and dealt with suicide, misogyny, and the mistreatment of widows in rural India.

Some notable actors that have worked in Mehta's Elements trilogy include Aamir Khan, Seema Biswas, Shabana Azmi, John Abraham, Kulbhushan Kharbanda, Rahul Khanna, Lisa Ray, and Nandita Das. A. R. Rahman composed critically acclaimed soundtracks for all the three films. These films are also notable for Mehta's collaborative work with author Bapsi Sidhwa. Sidhwa's novel Cracking India, (1991, U.S.; 1992, India; originally published as Ice Candy Man, 1988, England), is the basis for Mehta's 1998 film, Earth. Mehta's film, Water, was later published by Sidhwa as the 2006 novel, Water: A Novel.

== Fire (1996) ==
The first film in the series, Fire (1996), is set in contemporary India. It was a highly controversial film among certain conservative quarters in India due to the portrayal of lesbian characters.

== Earth (1998) ==
Earth (1998) (released in India as 1947: Earth) tells the story of the partition of India in 1947 from the vantage point of a young Parsi girl. Earth was the Indian nominee for the 2000 72nd Academy Award for Best Foreign Film, but was not included among the final five nominees selected by the AMPAS.

== Water (2005) ==
The final film in the trilogy, Water (2005), is set in the 1930s and focuses on the difficult lives of an impoverished group of widows living in an ashram. Water was nominated for the 2007 Academy Award for Best Foreign Language Film, making it Canada's first non-French-language film to receive a nomination in that category. The song Aayo Re Sakhi was included in the final list for Oscar nomination.

== Controversy ==
Mehta had originally intended to direct Water in February 2000, with the actors Shabana Azmi, Nandita Das and Akshay Kumar. Her earlier film, Fire, however, had previously attracted hostility from some people in the Hindu community, who objected to her depiction of Hindu culture and had organized attacks on cinemas that screened that film. Thus, the day before filming of Water was due to begin, the crew was informed that there were complications with gaining location permits. The following day, they learned that 2,000 protesters had stormed the ghats, destroying the main film set, burning and throwing it into the Ganges in protest of the film's subject matter.

The resulting tensions meant that Mehta struggled for many years to make Water and was eventually forced to make it in Sri Lanka rather than India. She eventually made the film, with a new cast, and a fake title used during filming (River Moon) in 2003. The struggle to make the film was detailed in a non-fiction book, Shooting Water: A Mother-Daughter Journey and the Making of the Film, written by Mehta's daughter, author Devyani Saltzman (whose father is Canadian producer and director Paul Saltzman, son of pioneering Canadian weather forecaster Percy Saltzman).

Critical responses to Mehta's work surfaced also during the release of Fire in 1998 because members of the Hindu Shiv Sena party felt it was an attack on Hindu tradition and the institution of marriage. Members of the party engaged in mass protests against the film at cinemas in Mumbai and Delhi. Following the film's premiere, Mehta travelled across Europe and North America for almost a year while being constantly guarded by police. Mehta and others staged counterdemonstrations to stop the film from being censored, including feminists who disagreed with the movie for different reasons (see "Criticism").

== Criticism ==
Indian feminist authors Mary E. John and Tejaswini Niranjana argued in 1999 that Fire reduces patriarchy to the denial and control of female sexuality:

Control of female sexuality is surely one of the ideological planks on which patriarchy rests. But by taking this idea literally, the film imprisons itself in the very ideology it seeks to fight, its own version of authentic reality being nothing but a mirror image of patriarchal discourse. Fire ends up arguing that the successful assertion of sexual choice is not only a necessary but also a sufficient condition—indeed, the sole criterion—for the emancipation of women. Thus the patriarchal ideology of 'control' is first reduced to pure denial—as though such control did not also involve the production and amplification of sexuality—and is later simply inverted to produce the film's own vision of women's liberation as free sexual 'choice'. (Economic and Political Weekly, March 6–13, 1999)

Other critics have argued that Mehta overlooks the complex politics of post-colonial India in her films, particularly when she portrays supposedly oppressed women and confirms Orientalist stereotypes about the exotic and "strange" nature of Indian culture, as in her film Water. Some critics have suggested that in the current geo-political context of imperialism which often relies on narratives of "saving women" (e.g. the U.S. War on Terror utilizing the supposedly oppressed Muslim woman narrative to morally justify war), Mehta's characters are too easily read by the audience as passive victims who need to be saved rather than agents in their own history.

Madhu Kishwar, then-editor of Manushi, wrote a highly critical review of Fire, finding fault with the depiction of the characters in the film as a "mean-spirited caricature of middle class family life among urban Hindus". She claimed that homosexuality was socially accepted in India as long as it remained a private affair, adding that Mehta "did a disservice to the cause of women […] by crudely pushing the Radha-Sita relationship into the lesbian mould", as women would now be unable to form intimate relationships with other women without being branded as lesbians.
