= Fire: A Queer Film Classic =

2010 book by Shohini Ghosh

- Author: Shohini Ghosh
- Language: English
- Subject: Fire
- Genre: Film Study
- Publisher: Orient Publishing
- Publication place: India
- Pages: 152
- ISBN: 9788122205039

Fire: A Queer Film Classic (2010) is a book written by film critic Shohini Ghosh about the controversial and critically appreciated 1996 film Fire directed by Deepa Mehta which starred Shabana Azmi and Nandita Das. It is part of the Queer Film Classics series from Arsenal Pulp Press.

== Content ==
Fire: A Queer Film Classic gives a detailed study about the Indian-born Canadian-based director Deepa Mehta's debut film. The film Fire was noted for its discussions on lesbian relationships and for its criticism of Hindu marriage practices. The movie is about two Hindu housewives named Radha and Sita who fall in love as a result of their failed marriages. Their relationship gets on stake when one of the husband learns about it from the servant. The film ends where the two women leave their families to make a life for themselves. The movie never gives any indications about their future and left that entirely for the audience to imagine. The movie was also noted for the various metaphors it used for the concept of 'Fire'.

Though the film was premiered in 1996 and won several prestigious awards, it made its premiere in India only in 1999. Despite getting a clean approval from the Central Board of Film Certification, the movie ignited a series of controversies. Members of political parties including RSS and Shivsena, which were incensed by the film's explicit depiction of lesbians, made wide protests across the nation. Processions were made against the movie in cities along with burning down movie posters and effigies of the directors and lead actors. In Mumbai and Delhi, theaters screening the film were attacked. However, after a series of counterprotests and approaching the court, the film was given permission to screen in India without any hindrance and eventually turned out to be a financial success.

The book examines in detail the controversy caused by the film; the situations leading to that; and its results. The book also considers the film's approach to sexism and marriage practises existing in India, along with the problems faced by women due to religion and rituals.

== Background ==
Fire is a 1996 film directed and written by Deepa Mehta and starring Shabana Azmi and Nandita Das. It is the first installment of Mehta's Elements trilogy. It is followed by Earth (1998) and Water (2005).The film is loosely based on Ismat Chugtai's 1941 story, Lihaaf (The Quilt). It was one of the first mainstream films in India to explicitly show homosexual relations. After its 1998 release in India, certain groups staged several protests, setting off a flurry of public dialogue around issues such as homosexuality and freedom of speech.
