= Murree (disambiguation) =

Murree is a hill station and tourist resort city in Punjab province of Pakistan.

Murree may also refer to the following:

== Geography ==
- Murree District, a district in northernmost region of Punjab, Pakistan that contains the city of Murree
- Murree Tehsil, one of the two administrative sub-divisions (tehsils) of Murree District
- PP-6 Murree, a constituency of Provincial Assembly of Punjab
- Murree Road, road in Islamabad Capital Territory and Rawalpindi District
- Murree Christian School, a defunct Christian school near Murree
- Murree Wildlife Park, a park in Murree

== Surname ==
- Fred Murree (1861–1950), Pawnee professional roller skater

== Other uses ==
- Murree Brewery, Pakistani multinational beverage manufacturing company
  - Murree beer, beer brand by Murree Brewery
- MV Murree, a Pakistani wrecked ship
- Murree vole, a species of rodent native to Murree
