= Fire (1996 film) =

- Film poster
- Directed by: Deepa Mehta
- Written by: Deepa Mehta
- Produced by: Bobby Bedi; Deepa Mehta
- Starring: Nandita Das; Shabana Azmi
- Cinematography: Giles Nuttgens
- Edited by: Barry Farrell
- Music by: A. R. Rahman
- Production companies: Kaleidoscope Entertainment; Trial by Fire Films
- Distributed by: Zeitgeist Films
- Release dates: 6 September 1996 (TIFF); 5 November 1998 (India)
- Running time: 108 minutes
- Countries: India; Canada
- Language: English
- Budget: $800,000
- Box office: $501,533

Fire is a 1996 English-language romantic drama film written and directed by Deepa Mehta, starring Shabana Azmi and Nandita Das. An Indo-Canadian co-production, it is the first installment of Mehta's Elements trilogy; it is succeeded by Earth (1998) and Water (2005).

The film is loosely based on Ismat Chughtai's 1942 story, "Lihaaf" ("The Quilt"). Fire is one of the first mainstream Bollywood films to explicitly show homosexual relations, and the first to feature a lesbian relationship. After its 1998 release in India, activists staged several protests, setting off a flurry of public dialogue around issues such as homosexuality and freedom of speech.

== Plot ==
The film opens with a young Radha sitting in a mustard field with her parents. Her mother tells her a tale of a person who wanted to see the ocean, but Radha says that she does not understand the moral of the story.

The film flashes forward to Sita, a newly married woman on honeymoon with her husband Jatin, who is distant and shows little interest in Sita. Jatin is in a typical joint-family arrangement – he lives with his older brother Ashok, his sister-in-law Radha, his paralysed mother Biji and the family servant Mundu. Ashok and Jatin run a small store that sells food and rents videotapes.

Jatin shows no care for Sita, and she learns that he only agreed to the arranged marriage in order to put an end to Ashok's nagging. Jatin continues to date his modern Chinese girlfriend, and Sita does not rebuke him. The rest of Jatin's home is not rosy either. Biji is immobile and speechless after a stroke, and Sita and Radha must constantly attend to her. Sita spends her days slaving in the hot kitchen, and finds herself lonely and frustrated at night because Jatin is out with his girlfriend. She yearns to break out of this stifling situation.

It is revealed that Radha faces a similar problem. Many years ago, Ashok had come under the influence of Swamiji, a local religious preacher, who teaches that desires are the cause of suffering and must be suppressed. Ashok is completely taken by these monastic teachings and suppresses all his desires. He also donates large sums from the meager store income to treat the Swamiji's hydrocele condition. Swamiji teaches that sexual contact is permitted only as a means for procreation, and Radha is infertile. Accordingly, Ashok aims to stamp out all his desires and has not slept with Radha for the past thirteen years. He puts Radha through an excruciating ritual in which they lie motionless next to each other whenever he wants to test his resolve. Radha is racked with guilt over her inability to have children and driven to frustration by the ritual.

While the older Radha remains bound by tradition and subdued into silence, the younger Sita refuses to accept her fate. Sita's attitude slowly spills over onto Radha, who becomes slightly more assertive. One evening, shunned by their husbands and driven to desperation by their unfulfilled longings, Radha and Sita seek solace in each other and become lovers. Overjoyed at finding satisfaction in this manner, they continue it in secret. They eventually realise their love for each other and start looking for ways to move out. The pair's daily antics and adventures are witnessed by Biji, who disapproves but is unable to stop them. After some time, Mundu becomes aware of their relationship and he causes Ashok to walk in on Radha and Sita.

Ashok is horrified. He is also shattered when he finds this incident has stoked his own long-dormant desire. Sita decides to pack her belongings and leave the house immediately, while Radha stays behind in order to talk to her husband. The women promise to meet each other later that night. Ashok confronts Radha, who overcomes her subservience and pours out her emotions. Amid this argument, Radha's sari catches fire and Ashok angrily watches her burn without helping. Radha puts out the flames and recalls her mother's advice from when she was young – she can finally see her ocean.

An injured Radha leaves Ashok, moving out in order to join Sita.

== Cast ==
- Nandita Das as Sita
- Shabana Azmi as Radha
  - Karishma Jhalani as young Radha
- Ramanjit Kaur as Radha's mother
- Dilip Mehta as Radha's father
- Javed Jaffrey as Jatin
- Vinay Pathak as Guide at Taj Mahal
- Kushal Rekhi as Biji
- Ranjit Chowdhry as Mundu
- Kulbhushan Kharbanda as Ashok
- Alice Poon as Julie
- Ram Gopal Bajaj as Swamiji
- Ravinder Happy as Oily man in video shop
- Devyani Saltzman as Girl in video shop
- Sunil Chabra as Milkman on bicycle
- Avijit Dutt as Julie's father
- Shasea Bahadur as Julie's brother
- Meher Chand as Goddess Sita
- Bahadur Chand as God Ram
- Puran, Sohan Lal, Meher, Amarjit Chand, and Karahm Chand as 'Ramayan' theatrical troupe members
- Kabir Chowdhury as Boy in video shop
- Laurence Côte as French tourist at the Taj Mahal

== Production ==
The film had a budget of $800,000 and the crew deferred their salaries, worth $450,000.

Mehta stated that the first scene that she imagined was Sita and Jatin's visit to the Taj Mahal just after their arranged marriage—a sister-in-law was then introduced as that is a common feature she saw in her extended family. Azmi disclosed in 2025 that the film was originally going to be filmed in Hindi, but just a few days before shooting began, the dialogues were changed to English, as it was felt that "the dialogue didn't ring true". She also stated that the ending of the film was originally a different one but was changed to the released version on the advice of Farhan Akhtar.

Azmi initially hesitated about starring in the film, because though she liked the script, she was worried it would negatively affect her charity work with disadvantaged women in slums. However, she changed her mind, with the encouragement of her family (especially Zoya Akhtar, as it made her realise the next generation had very different worldviews), as well as her belief that not everybody would react the same, and that therefore it was important to get a conversation started.

== Controversies and reaction ==
Fire was passed uncut by India's Central Board of Film Certification (CBFC) in May 1998 with a rating of Adult, the only condition being that the name of the character Sita (which is also the name of a significant Hindu goddess) be changed to Nita. The board allowed the original name back after more consideration. The board made their decision based on what it called the importance of the story for Indian women. The film was first screened on 13 November 1998 and ran to full houses in 42 theaters in most metropolitan cities throughout India for almost three weeks.

On 2 December, more than 200 Shiv Sainiks stormed a Cinemax theatre in suburban Goregaon in Mumbai, smashing glass panes, burning posters and shouting slogans. They compelled managers to refund tickets to moviegoers. On 3 December, the Regal theatre in Delhi was similarly stormed. American film critic William Arnold, in India doing a feature on the Bollywood Cinema, witnessed the Regal rampage and later reported: "I watched about a dozen Shiv Sena activists−including three women with canes−threaten the terrified manager, disperse the line of moviegoers, smash ticket booth and display windows, then force their way into the theater, smashing the food counter and terrorizing patrons. Outside, other Shiv Sena tore up the film's posters and billboards and set them ablaze in a bonfire." He added, "Apparently, this opening was particularly offensive to them because the Regal was a sacred site of Hindu supremacy: the spot where, 49 years ago, Gandhi's assassins−ex-members of the Shiv Sena's parent organization, the RSS−met on the fateful morning of the murder in January 1948."

Mina Kulkarni, one of the Delhi protesters, explained the reasoning behind their actions: "If women's physical needs get fulfilled through lesbian acts, the institution of marriage will collapse, reproduction of human beings will stop". Bajrang Dal workers with lathis invaded Raj Palace and a few other theatres in Surat, breaking up everything in sight and driving away frightened audiences. Some of the rioters set fire to theatres screening the film.

Theatres in Surat and Pune stopped screening the film on the same day. However, when attackers attempted to shut down a screening in Calcutta, ushers and audience fought back and the theatre stayed open. Maharashtra's Chief Minister, Manohar Joshi, supported the actions to shut down screenings of Fire: "I congratulate them for what they have done. The film's theme is alien to our culture".

On 4 December, the Ministry of Information and Broadcasting referred the film back to the CBFC for re-examination. The Indian government was criticised for siding with the vandals. On 5 December a group of film personalities and free speech activists, including Deepa Mehta, actor Dilip Kumar, and director Mahesh Bhatt, submitted a petition to the Supreme Court asking that a "sense of security" be provided, in addition to basic protection, so that the film could be screened smoothly. The petition referenced articles 14, 19, 21 and 25 of the Indian Constitution, which promise many of the fundamental rights like the right to equality, life and liberty, freedom of speech and expression, freedom of conscience, free expression of religious practice and belief, and the right to hold peaceful meetings. On being asked the reason for discomfort, Kumar said that he had not seen the film and was not much concerned about its content but rather the kind of vandalism that takes place on their cultural life, whenever such issues comes up.

On 7 December, activists from 32 organisations, including Campaign for Lesbian Rights (CALERI), protested against the withdrawal of Fire, carrying placards, shouting anti-Shiv Sena slogans and crying for the freedom of right to expression. On 12 December about 60 Shiv Sena men stripped down to their underwear and squatted in front of Kumar's house to protest his support of Fire. Twenty-two were arrested, and Kumar, as well as others involved in the production of the film, were provided with police security.

Cinemax reopened screenings of Fire on 18 December, but 100 members of the Bharatiya Janata Party (BJP) vandalised posters at the Sundar Theatre in Kanpur despite the police commissioner's reassurance that protection had been arranged. Fire was re-released without cuts by the Censor Board on 12 February 1999. Theatre screenings were resumed on 26 February and continued without incident.

=== Fire and lesbian rights in India ===
Fire and the conversation that began around the movie's general reception, both by supporters and detractors, encouraged lesbians and gay rights activists in India to be more vocal about their existence and the erasure of queerness from India's historical heritage. The release of this movie corresponded with the beginning of widespread national conversation about lesbian and gay rights. A new lesbian rights group, calling themselves the Campaign for Lesbian Rights (CALERI), formed in response to the backlash. This group held their own peaceful gatherings across India.

== Soundtrack ==
Fire: Original Motion Picture Soundtrack

Film score by A. R. Rahman
- Released: 1996
- Recorded: Panchathan Record Inn
- Genre: Feature film soundtrack
- Length: 46:32
- Label: Colosseum Records
- Producer: Bobby Bedi

A. R. Rahman chronology
Kadhal Desam (1996)	Fire: Original Motion Picture Soundtrack (1996)	Mr. Romeo (1996)

The soundtrack was composed and performed by A. R. Rahman except for the tracks "Ramayan" and "Allah Hu". "Julie's Theme" and "China Town" were added as bonus tracks and were not used in the movie. A. R. Rahman reused or reworked some of his acclaimed songs from Bombay.

List of songs in the soundtrack
Song	Notes
"Bombay Theme Intro"	Instrumental
"Radha and Sita Love Theme"	Instrumental
"Sita's Theme"	Instrumental
"Radha's Theme"	Instrumental
"Antha Arabikkadaloram"	A. R. Rahman
"Mundus Fantasy Part 1"	Instrumental
"Mundus Fantasy Part 2"	Instrumental
"Desire Night"	Instrumental
"Bangle's Theme"	Instrumental
"Ramayan"	Instrumental (written by Ramayan Theatrical Group)
"Allah Hu"	Miraj Ahmed (written by Miraj Ahmed)
"Radha's Confession"	Instrumental
"Passion"	Instrumental
"Bombay Theme Finale Radha's Soul"	Instrumental
"Julies Theme"	Instrumental
"China Town"	Instrumental

== Reception ==
In the weeks following its release, reviewers praised the film's explicit depiction of a homosexual relationship as "gutsy" and "explosive". Following the Shiv Sena attacks on the film, prominent party members said Fire had been targeted because it was an "immoral and pornographic" film "against Indian tradition and culture". The lesbian relationship depicted in the film was criticised as "not a part of Indian history or culture". Other politicians of the Hindu right voiced fears that the film would "spoil [Indian] women" and younger generations by teaching "happy wives not to depend on their husbands" and informing the public about "acts of perversion". Speaking on the dangers of Fire, Shiv Sena chief Bal Thackeray compared lesbianism to "a sort of a social AIDS" which might "spread like an epidemic". Furthermore, Thackeray claimed that the film was an attack on Hinduism because the protagonists were named Sita and Radha, both significant goddesses in Hindu belief, and that he would withdraw his objections to the film if the names were changed to Muslim names.

A statement issued from the Shiv Sena's women's wing said: "If women's physical needs get fulfilled through lesbian acts, the institution of marriage will collapse, reproduction of human beings will stop". Critics charged the Shiv Sena of committing "cultural terrorism" and of using the rhetoric of "Indian tradition" to protest images of female independence and suppress freedom of speech: "The justification for [Shiv Sena's] action... demonstrates that Indian 'culture' for the Sangh Parivar is defined essentially in terms of male control over female sexuality".

Gay activist Ashok Row Kavi criticised the Shiv Sena's protests as "gay-bashing" and disputed their claims that lesbianism was "against Indian tradition", indicating that homosexuality is in fact abundantly present in Hinduism and that the criminalisation of homosexuality in India was a legacy of British colonial rule and Christianity. Pointing to evidence of lesbianism in Indian tradition, he said: "What's wrong in two women having sex? If they think it doesn't happen in the Indian society they should see the sculptures of Khajuraho or Konark".

Madhu Kishwar, then-editor of Manushi, wrote a highly critical review of Fire, finding fault with the depiction of the characters in the film as a "mean-spirited caricature of middle-class family life among urban Indians". She claimed that homosexuality was socially accepted in India as long as it remained a private affair, adding that Deepa Mehta "did a disservice to the cause of women... by crudely pushing the Radha-Sita relationship into the lesbian mould", as women would now be unable to form intimate relationships with other women without being branded as lesbians.

Feminist critics of Mehta's films argue that Mehta's portrayal of women and gender relations is over-simplified. Noted Indian feminist authors Mary E. John and Tejaswini Niranjana wrote in 1999 that Fire reduces patriarchy to the denial and control of female sexuality. The authors make the point that the film traps itself in its own rendering of patriarchy:

Control of female sexuality is surely one of the ideological planks on which patriarchy rests. But by taking this idea literally, the film imprisons itself in the very ideology it seeks to fight, its own version of authentic reality being nothing but a mirror image of patriarchal discourse. Fire ends up arguing that the successful assertion of sexual choice is not only a necessary but also a sufficient condition—indeed, the sole criterion—for the emancipation of women. Thus the patriarchal ideology of 'control' is first reduced to pure denial – as though such control did not also involve the production and amplification of sexuality – and is later simply inverted to produce the film's own vision of women's liberation as free sexual 'choice'.

Whatever subversive potential Fire might have had (as a film that makes visible the 'naturalised' hegemony of heterosexuality in contemporary culture, for example) is nullified by its largely masculinist assumption that men should not neglect the sexual needs of their wives, lest they turn lesbian.

The authors additionally argue that viewers must ask tough questions from films such as Fire that place themselves in the realm of "alternative" cinema and aim to occupy not only aesthetic, but also political space.

Mehta expressed frustration in interviews that the film was consistently described as a lesbian film. She said "lesbianism is just another aspect of the film... Fire is not a film about lesbians", but rather about "the choices we make in life".

Shohini Ghosh wrote a 2010 monograph about the film and the public response to it, titled Fire: A Queer Film Classic.

=== North America ===
The film did not attract any particular attention outside India, including in Canada, despite being co-produced there; an article in The Toronto Star mentioned how it did not attract any attention at its initial premiere at the Toronto Film Festival. However, the film managed to attract a small but significant amount of audience in the United States, due largely due to a rave review in the Los Angeles Times and an interview with Mehta by The New York Times. The film consequently managed to have some screenings in some countries in Europe like France and Germany. Ruth Vanita touched on the topic of the niche interest in the film overseas, stating that the film had deep and distinct Indian elements, such as the joint family structure and the mechanisms of arranged marriages, which meant that non-Indian audiences could only understand the film on a relatively shallower level.

== See also ==
- The Journey (2004)
- Ek Ladki Ko Dekha Toh Aisa Laga (2019)
- List of LGBT films directed by women
- Homosexuality in India
- Freedom of expression in India
