= Economy of Rawalpindi =

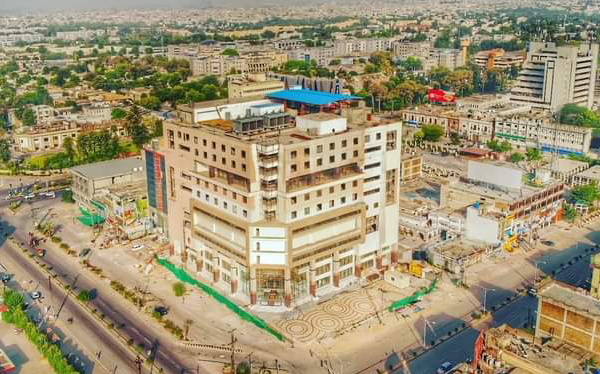

The economy of Rawalpindi and the surrounding district has a diverse industrial base. With a population exceeding 3.2 million, Rawalpindi is the third largest city of the Punjab province of Pakistan, and the fourth largest city in the country. It is located in the northernmost part of Punjab, strategically connecting the region with Kashmir to the east and the province of Khyber Pakhtunkhwa to the north. It also borders Islamabad, the capital of Pakistan, of which it is considered a sister city of. It has historically been an important industrial and commercial center of the Punjab region. Besides having an important railroad junction, the city has been one of the most important military cantonment areas in South Asia since the British Raj era. The main industries of the city include oil refineries, gas processing, steel manufacturing, iron mills, railroad yards, a brewery, sawmills, tent factories, textiles, hosiery, pottery, leather goods production., transport and tourism.

== Overview ==
After the decline of the Mughal Empire in the South Asia, the Sikhs invaded, sacked and occupied Rawalpindi. The land, houses and businesses belonging to the local Muslims were occupied and settled by the invading Sikhs in 1765 and they also invited the Hindu traders to settle in the city. Slowly the economy recovered as the Muslim traders returned to the city and this was significant economic milestone in the Rawalpindi's history, and the city gradually became a regional trade hub owing to its location between Punjab and Kashmir.

During the British Raj, a military cantonment was established in the area. The army township aided in promoting commercial activity.
