= Arun Pathak =

Indian political activist

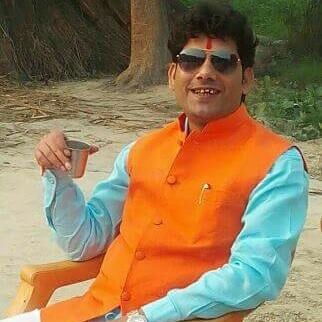
- Born: 16 June 1975 (age 51); Varanasi, Uttar Pradesh, India
- Occupation: political activist
- Organization: Vishwa Hindu Sena

Arun Pathak (born 16 June 1975) is an Indian politician and social activist from Varanasi. He is involved in charity work and campaigns for protection of Hindu culture. He has attracted public attention for staging suicide attempts as a form of political protest.

== Activism ==
As of 2009, Pathak had been rescued from suicide attempts at least eleven times by his followers.

=== Liquor stores ===
In 1997, Pathak started a campaign to ban liquor stores from being in close proximity to religious sites. He wanted this policy to be in place in Varanasi and Ayodhya. To get attention for this campaign, Pathak climbed to the top of a 300-foot tower in Varanasi and threatened to jump to death. After getting written assurance from the police that the shops would be closed, Pathak climbed down from the tower.

=== Babri Masjid demolition celebration ===
In 1998, Pathak organised a celebration in Varanasi to commemorate the 1992 demolition of the Babri Masjid. He put up flags as decoration, but the local police had them taken down and destroyed. In response Pathak went to police station and took 50 valium pills in a suicide attempt. Three days later Pathak woke up and found that the in charge police officer Singh had not been fired, so Pathak took 50 more valium pills and threw himself in front of the car of the chief minister of Uttar Pradesh. Pathak survived and a police officer who was responsible along with Singh was fired for misconduct in removing the flags.

=== Film protests ===
Pathak led a Vishwa Hindu Sena group in Varanasi to oppose the screening of the film Girlfriend (2004), which dealt with subject matter about lesbians.

Deepa Mehta filmed parts of the 2005 film Water on the ghats in Varanasi. The film was controversial to Pathak for having the line "... if a Brahmin or God sleeps with a woman she is blessed", which he interpreted to be oppressive to women's rights. To protest the filming, Pathak tied a large stone around his waist, took a boat to the center of the Ganges, and jumped into the river when the cameras were filming. His friends jumped into the river, rescued him, and rushed him to the hospital. Pathak's actions were followed by some rioting. The Varanasi city government responded by ordering film production to stop.

Pakistani Ghazal virtuoso Ghulam Ali was invited to perform at Sankat Mochan music festival in 2016 which Pathak did not like. He said that instead of offering the stage to a Pakistani singer, the organisers should invite Indian musicians. He also blamed the organiser for the controversy. He also said that a beef eater like Ghulam Ali must not be allowed to enter in a Hindu temple.

In 2017, Pathak announced that he with his follower will worship at the controversial temple Mata Shringar Gauri and when Police and the administration arrested him to stop him from doing so, as a protest he again tried to attempt suicide by cutting veins of his hand. He got critically injured and admitted to trauma center immediately.

On 15 August 2018, Pathak and his followers were again arrested by the police as he tried to hoist the national flag on a controversial place Bindu Madhav temple also known as Madhav Rao Dharhara which is a National Monument. This is not the first time when Pathak stopped and got arrested for hoisting the Tricolour on every national festival he attempt to hoist the Tricolor and get arrested with national flag.

== Gallery ==
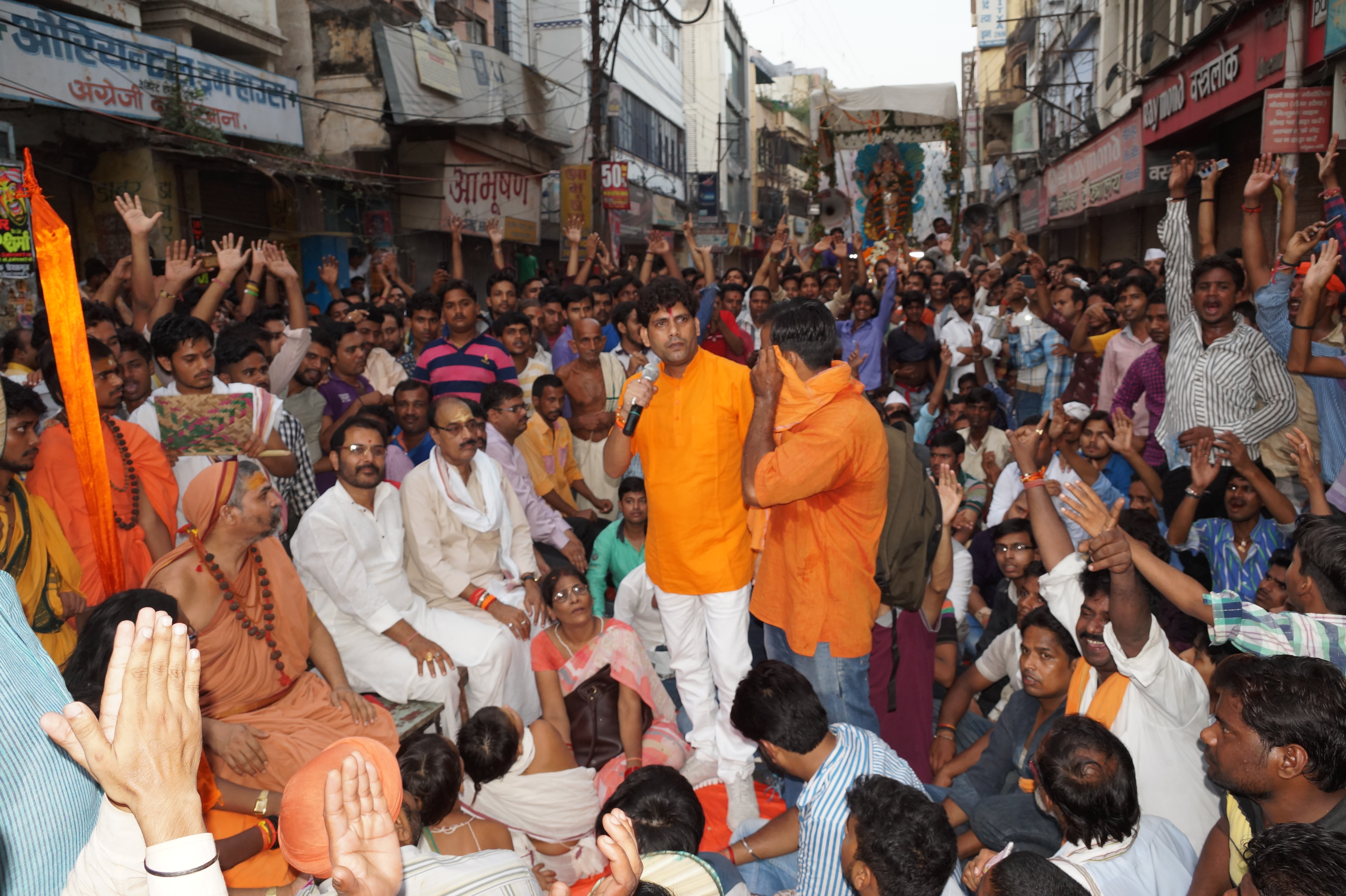
Arun Pathak a public leader

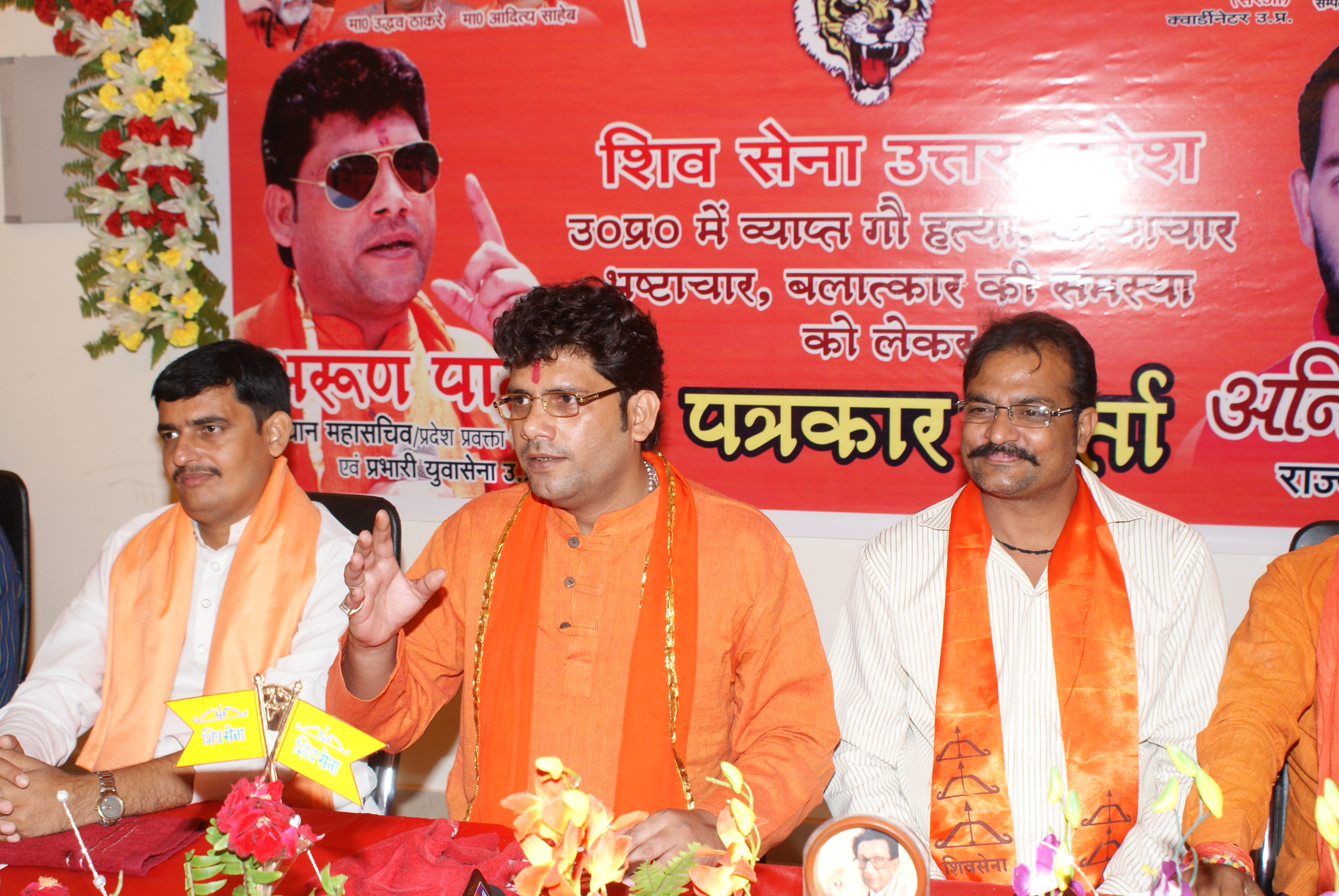
Arun Pathak addressing a press conference as a Shiv Sena spokesperson

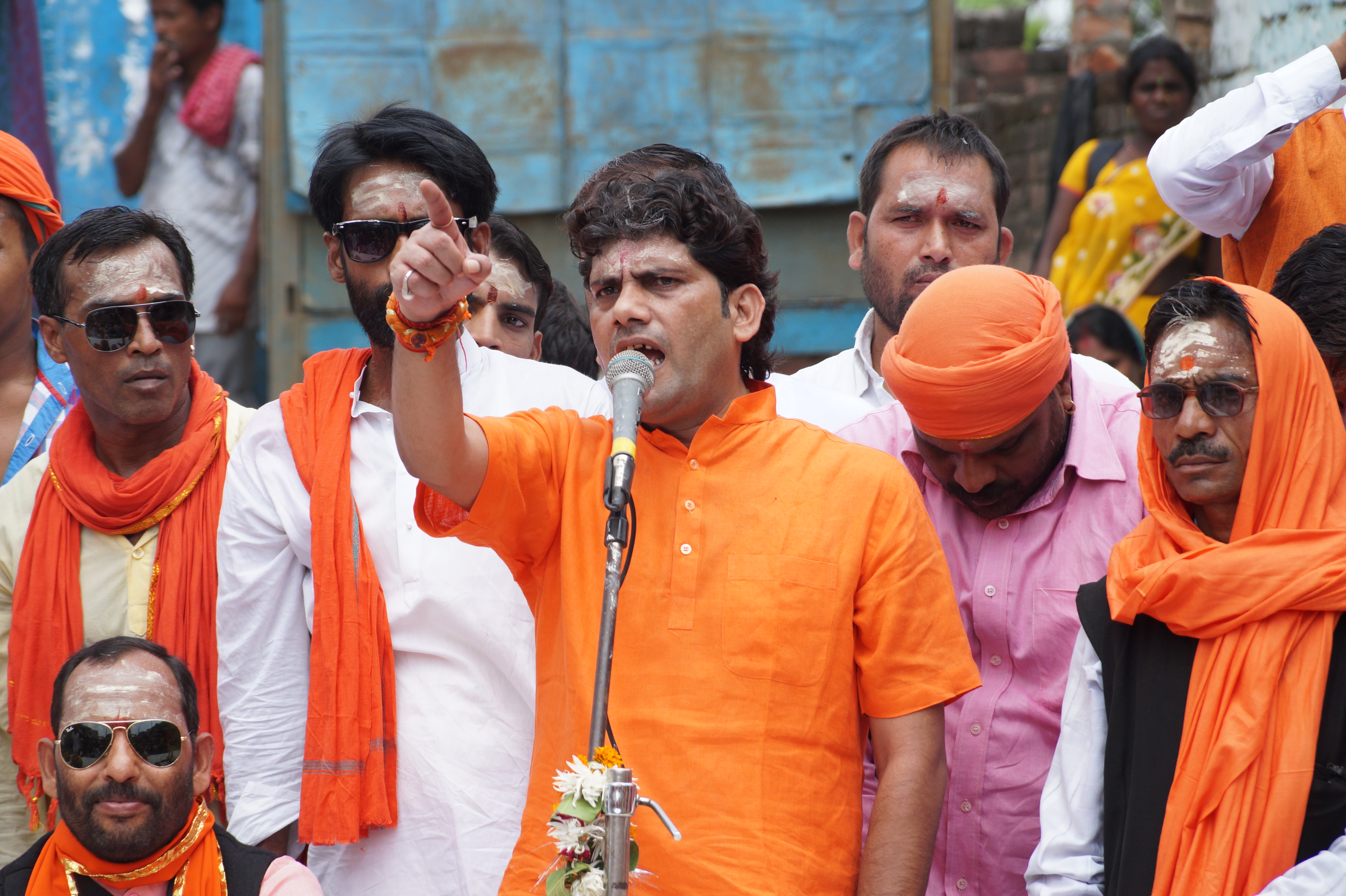
Arun Pathak at a Hindutva meet

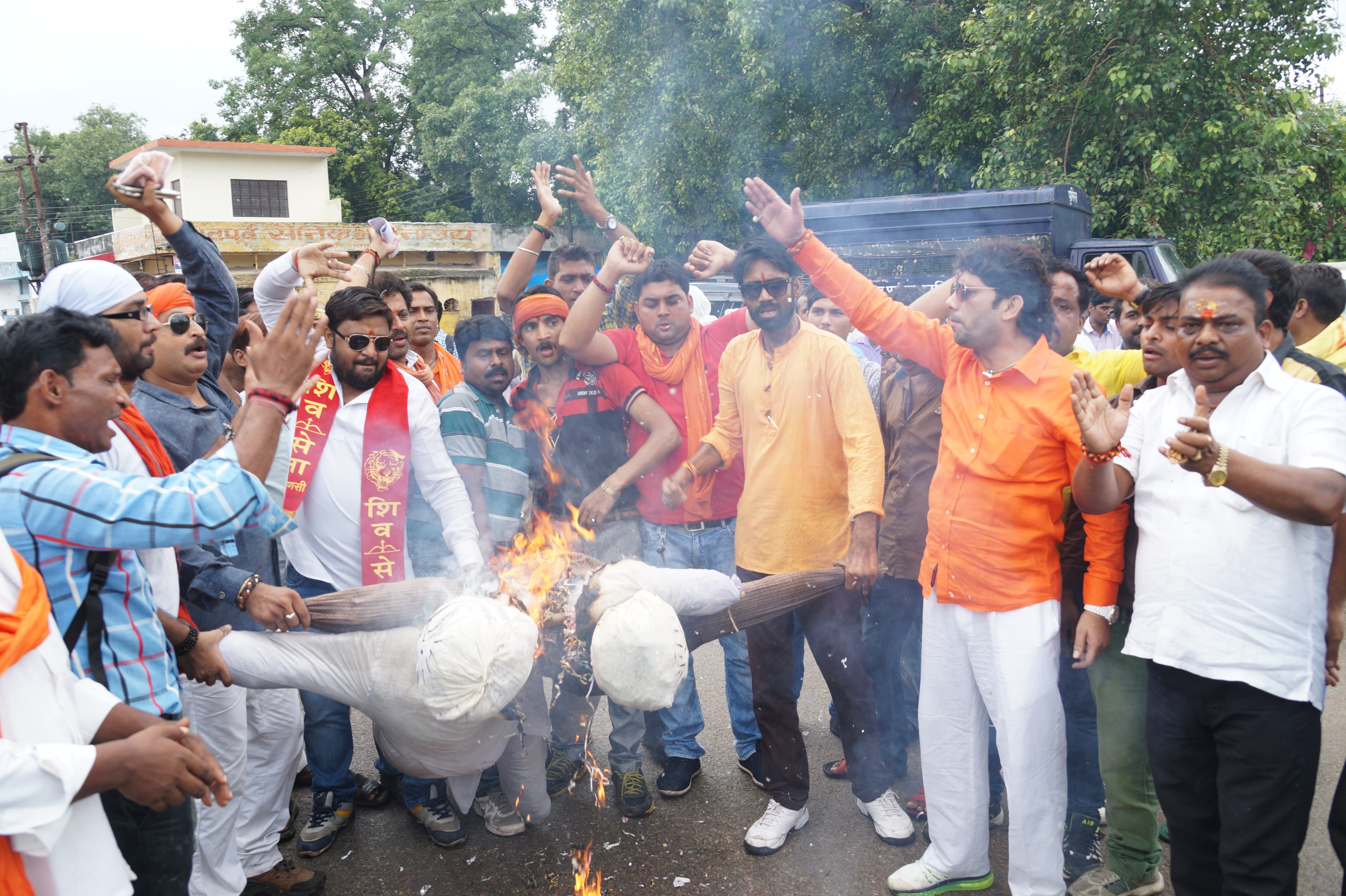
Arun Pathak at a protest

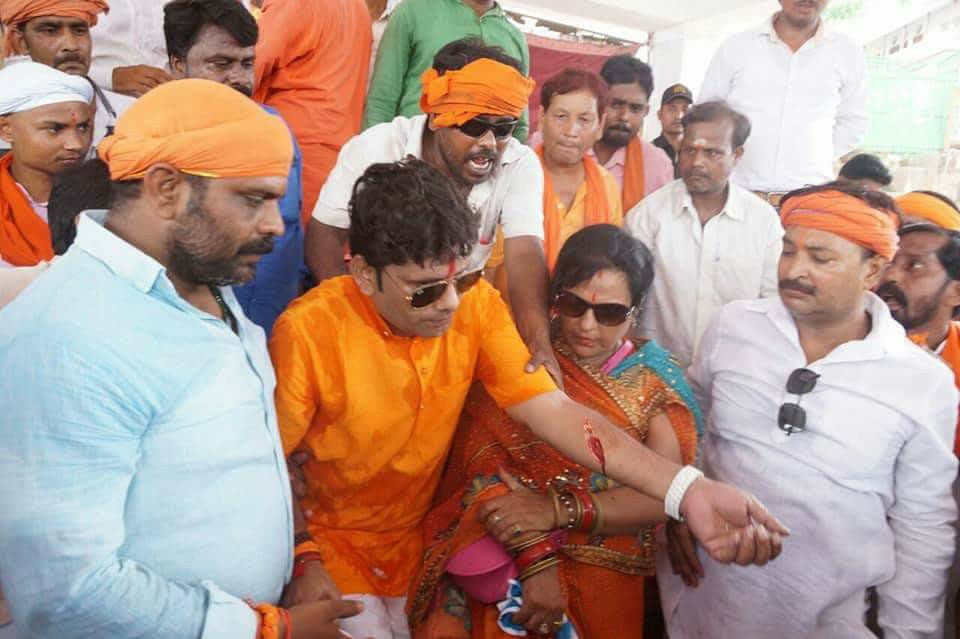
Arun Pathak attempt suicide protest by cutting his veins

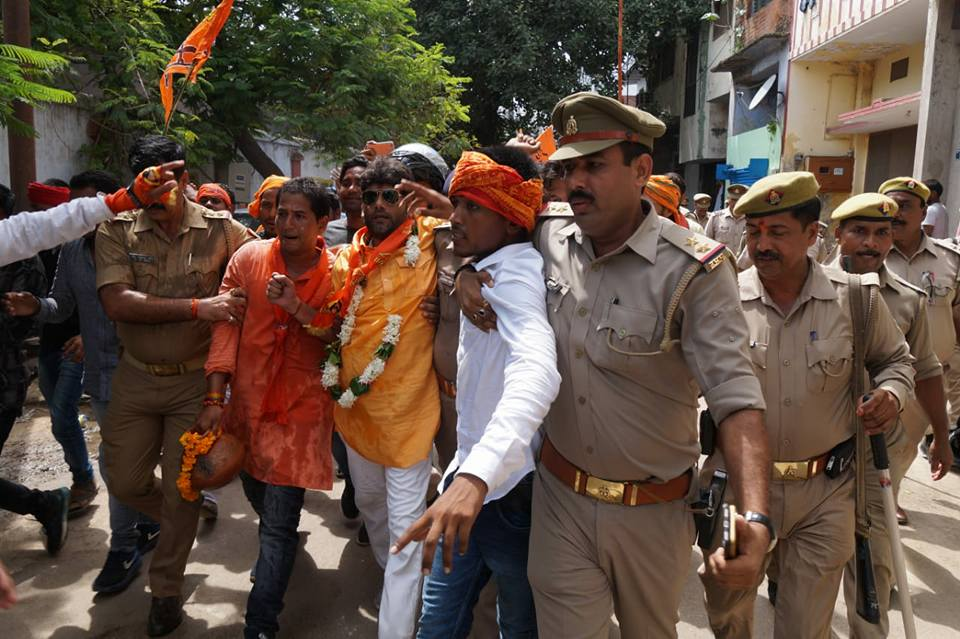
Arun Pathak arrested after attempting to hoist National Flag at Madhav Rao Dharhara

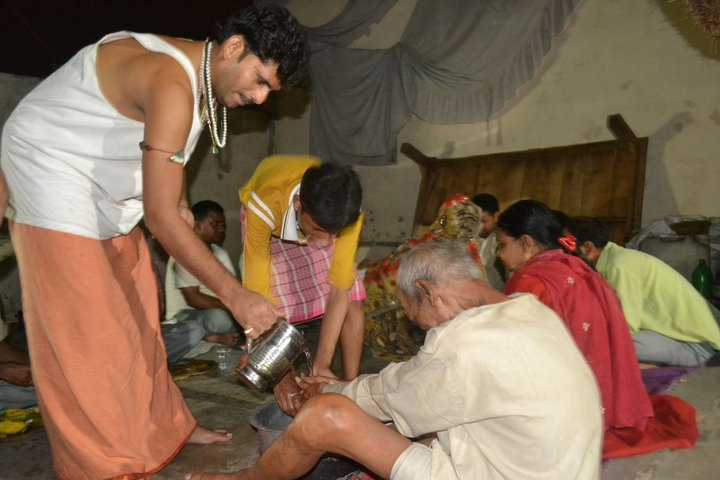
Arun Pathak at a charity event for blind people

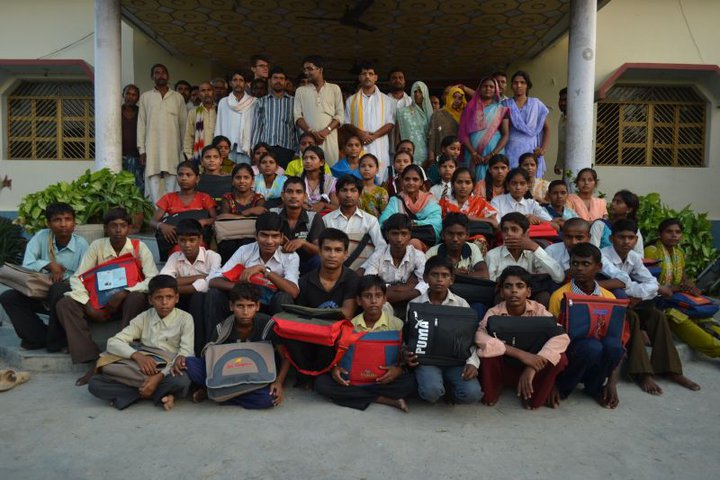
Pathak at a book and stationery distribution event for poor students

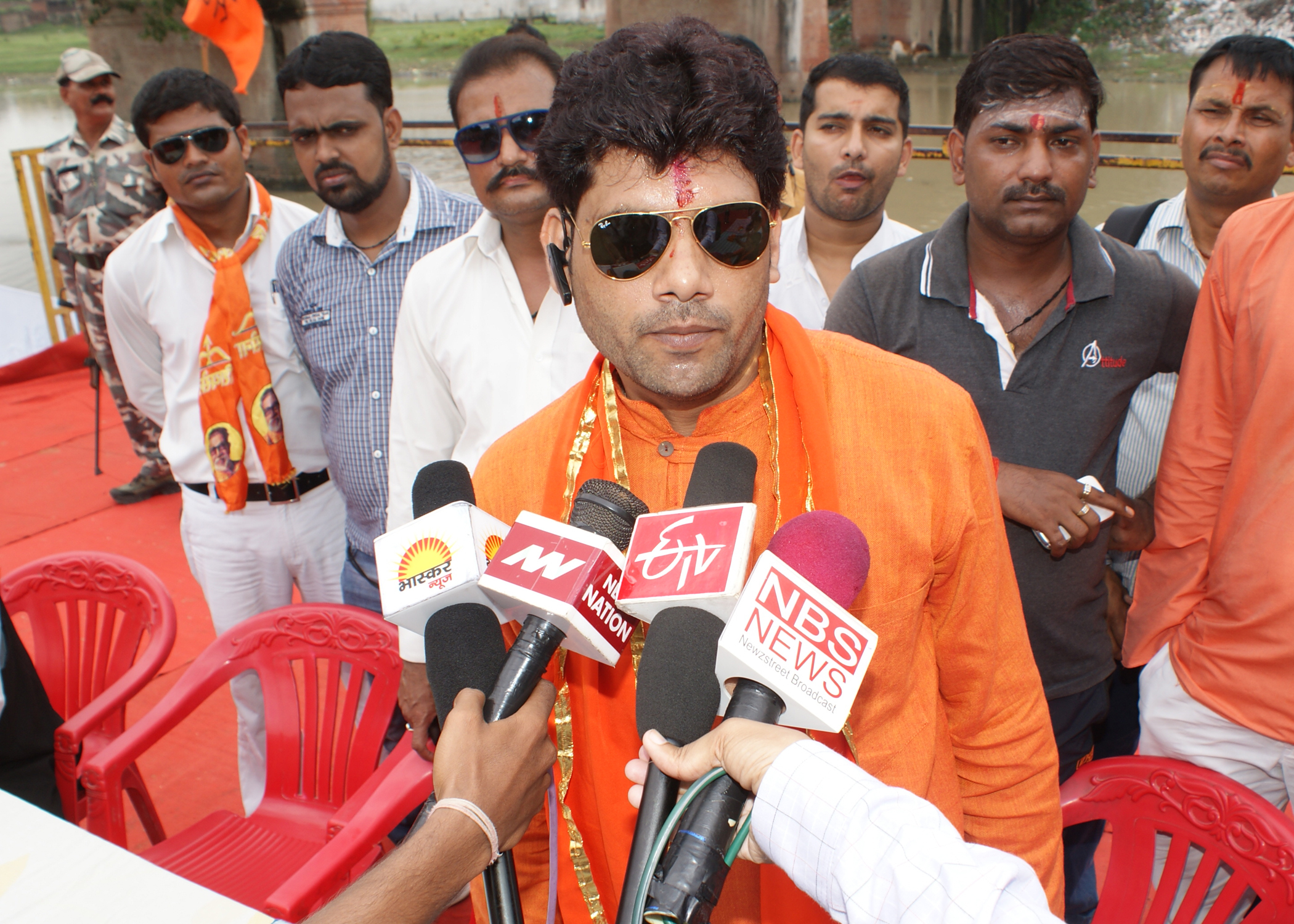
Arun Pathak addressing media
