= Water (2005 film) =

2005 film by Deepa Mehta

- Film poster
- Directed by: Deepa Mehta
- Screenplay by: Anurag Kashyap
- Story by: Deepa Mehta
- Produced by: David Hamilton
- Starring: Seema Biswas; Lisa Ray; John Abraham; Sarala Kariyawasam; Manorama
- Cinematography: Giles Nuttgens
- Edited by: Colin Monie
- Music by: Score: Mychael Danna; Songs: A. R. Rahman
- Production company: David Hamilton Productions
- Distributed by: Mongrel Media (Canada); Fox Searchlight Pictures (United States); B.R. Films (India)
- Release dates: 9 September 2005 (Toronto); 9 March 2007 (India)
- Running time: 114 minutes
- Countries: Canada; United States; India
- Languages: Hindi; English
- Box office: $10.4 million

Water (Hindi: जल, romanized: Jal) is a 2005 drama film written and directed by Deepa Mehta, with screenplay by Anurag Kashyap. It is set in 1938 and explores the lives of widows at an ashram in India. The film is also the third and final installment of Mehta's Elements trilogy. It was preceded by Fire (1996) and Earth (1998). Author Bapsi Sidhwa wrote the 2006 novel based upon the film, Water: A Novel, published by Milkweed Press. Sidhwa's earlier novel, Cracking India was the basis for Earth, the second film in the trilogy.

Water is a dark introspect into the tales of rural Indian widows in the 1940s and covers controversial subjects such as child marriage, misogyny and ostracism. The film premiered at the 2005 Toronto International Film Festival, where it was honoured with the Opening Night Gala, and was released across Canada in November of that year. It was first released in India on 9 March 2007.

The film stars Seema Biswas, Lisa Ray, John Abraham and Sarala Kariyawasam in pivotal roles and Manorama, Kulbhushan Kharbanda, Waheeda Rehman, Raghuvir Yadav and Vinay Pathak in supporting roles. Featured songs for the film were composed by A. R. Rahman, with lyrics by Sukhwinder Singh and Raqeeb Alam. After Rahman quit the film following nationwide controversy, the background score was composed by Mychael Danna, although the songs which Rahman had composed before opting out were retained.

In 2008, inspired by the film, Dilip Mehta directed a documentary, The Forgotten Woman about widows in India. The film was also written by Deepa Mehta.

Water was announced as Canada's submission for the Academy Award for Best International Feature Film at the 79th Academy Awards, it was nominated, but it did not win.

== Plot ==
In 1938 India, Chuyia is an eight-year-old girl, whose husband suddenly dies. In keeping with traditions of widowhood, she is dressed in a white sari, her head is shaven and she is left in an ashram, to spend the rest of her life in renunciation. There are fourteen women who live in the dilapidated house, sent there to expiate bad karma, as well as to relieve their families of the financial and emotional burdens of caring for widows. The ashram is ruled by Madhumati, a pompous lady in her 70s. Her only friend is the pimp, Gulabi, a hijra who keeps Madhumati supplied with cannabis. The two also have a side business: Gulabi helps Madhumati prostitute Kalyani, a beautiful young widow, by ferrying her across the Ganges to customers. Kalyani was forced into prostitution as a teenager to support the ashram.

Shakuntala is perhaps the most enigmatic of the women. Witty and sharp, she is also one of the few widows who can read. She exudes enough anger that even Madhumati leaves her alone. Shakuntala is caught between being a God-fearing, devout Hindu, and her hatred of being a widow. She seeks the counsel of Sadananda, a priest, who makes her aware of her unjust and unholy situation. She becomes attached to Chuyia upon her arrival at the ashram.

Chuyia is convinced that her stay is a temporary one and that her mother will come to take her away but quickly adapts to her new life. She befriends Kalyani, and witnesses Kalyani's budding romance with Narayan, a charming upper-class follower of Mahatma Gandhi. Despite her initial reluctance, Kalyani eventually buys into his dream of marriage and a new life in Calcutta. She agrees to go away with him.

Her plan is disrupted when Chuyia accidentally reveals their affair to Madhumati. Enraged at losing a source of income and afraid of the social disgrace, Madhumati locks Kalyani up. Much to everyone's surprise, the God-fearing Shakuntala lets Kalyani out to go meet Narayan, who ferries her across the river to take her to his home. However, when Kalyani recognizes Narayan's bungalow, she realizes that Narayan is the son of one of the men whom she has been pimped out to. In shock, she demands that he take her back. Narayan confronts his father, learning the reason for Kalyani's actions. Disgusted, he decides to walk out on his father and join Mahatma Gandhi. He arrives at the ashram to take Kalyani with him, only to find that Kalyani has drowned herself.

Madhumati sends Chuyia away to be prostituted as a replacement for Kalyani. Shakuntala finds out and tries to prevent the worst, but she is too late. When Shakuntala finds Chuyia, Chuyia is deeply traumatized and catatonic. Cradling Chuyia, Shakuntala spends the night on the shores of the river. Walking through town with Chuyia in her arms, she hears talk of Gandhi speaking at the train station, ready to leave town. She follows the crowd to receive his blessing. As the train departs, in an act of desperation Shakuntala runs alongside the train, asking people to take Chuyia with them. She spots Narayan on the train and hands Chuyia over to him. The train departs, carrying Chuyia away while leaving the teary-eyed Shakuntala behind.

== Cast ==
- Seema Biswas as Shakuntala
- Lisa Ray as Kalyani
- John Abraham as Narayan
- Waheeda Rehman as Bhagavati, Narayan's Mother
- Sarala Kariyawasam as Chuyia
- Buddhi Wickrama as Baba
- Ronica Sajnani as Kunti
- Manorama as Madhumati
- Rishma Malik as Snehalata
- Rajat Kapoor as Narayan's father
- Vidula Javalgekar as Patiraji (auntie)
- Daya Alwis as Saduram
- Raghuvir Yadav as Gulabi
- Vinay Pathak as Rabindra
- Kulbhushan Kharbanda as Sadananda
- Gerson Da Cunha as Seth Dwarkanath
- Iranganie Serasinghe as Mother-in-Law
- Mohan Jhangiani as Mahatma Gandhi
- Sanoja Bibile as Woman Bather
- Kalu The Puppy as Dog

== Production ==
Water is a co-production between Canada, India and the United States.

== Release ==
The film debuted on 8 September 2005 at the Toronto International Film Festival. After several controversies surrounding the film in India, the Indian censor boards cleared the film with a "U" certificate. It was released in India on 9 March 2007.

== Reception ==
=== Box office ===
During Sri Lanka screening, the film collected Rs. 42 million for its 38 days screening.

=== Critical response ===
Water received mostly positive reviews. On Rotten Tomatoes the film has an approval rating of 91% based on reviews from 96 critics, with an average rating of 7.6 out of 10. The site's consensus is that "this compassionate work of social criticism is also luminous, due to both its lyrical imagery and cast". On Metacritic the film has a weighted average score of 77 out of 100, based on 25 critics reviews, indicating "generally favorable reviews".

The film received high praise from Kevin Thomas, writing in the Los Angeles Times:

For all her impassioned commitment as a filmmaker, Mehta never preaches but instead tells a story of intertwining strands in a wholly compelling manner. Water, set in the British colonial India of 1938, is as beautiful as it is harrowing, its idyllic setting beside the sacred Ganges River contrasting with the widows' oppressive existence as outcasts. The film seethes with anger over their plight yet never judges, and possesses a lyrical, poetical quality. Just like the Ganges, life goes on flowing, no matter what. Mehta sees her people in the round, entrapped and blinded by a cruel and outmoded custom dictated by ancient religious texts but sustained more often by a family's desire to relieve itself of the economic burden of supporting widows. As a result, she is able to inject considerable humor in her stunningly perceptive and beautifully structured narrative. Water emerges as a film of extraordinary richness and complexity.

Jeannette Catsoulis of The New York Times selected Water as NYT Critics' Pick, calling it "exquisite": "Serene on the surface yet roiling underneath, the film neatly parallels the plight of widows under Hindu fundamentalism to that of India under British colonialism".

Roger Ebert of Chicago Sun-Times said: "The film is lovely in the way Satyajit Ray's films are lovely and the best elements of Water involve the young girl and the experiences seen through her eyes. I would have been content if the entire film had been her story" and gave it three stars out of four. Carrie Rickey of The Philadelphia Inquirer also praises Mehta's work on the trilogy saying that "profound, passionate and overflowing with incomparable beauty, Water, like the prior two films in director Deepa Mehta's "Elements" trilogy, celebrates the lives of women who resist marginalisation by Indian society".

In December 2005, it was named to the Toronto International Film Festival's annual Canada's Top Ten list of the year's best Canadian films.

=== Accolades ===
Date of ceremony	Award	Category	Recipients	Result
25 February 2007	79th Academy Awards	Best Foreign Language Film (Canada)	Deepa Mehta	Nominated
13 March 2006	Genie Awards or Canadian Screen Awards	Best Motion Picture	David Hamilton	Nominated
13 March 2006	Genie Awards or Canadian Screen Awards	Best Director	Deepa Mehta	Nominated
13 March 2006	Genie Awards or Canadian Screen Awards	Best Actress	Seema Biswas	Won
13 March 2006	Genie Awards or Canadian Screen Awards	Best Art and Production Design	Dilip Mehta	Nominated
13 March 2006	Genie Awards or Canadian Screen Awards	Best Cinematography	Giles Nuttgens	Won
13 March 2006	Genie Awards or Canadian Screen Awards	Best Screenplay	Deepa Mehta	Nominated
13 March 2006	Genie Awards or Canadian Screen Awards	Best Film Editing	Colin Monie	Nominated
13 March 2006	Genie Awards or Canadian Screen Awards	Best Original Score	Mychael Danna	Won
17 February 2006	Bangkok International Film Festival	Best Golden Kinnaree Film	Deepa Mehta	Won
20 January 2007	Broadcast Film Critics	Best Foreign Language Film	Deepa Mehta	Nominated
17 December 2007	Dallas-Fort Worth Film Critics Association	Best Foreign Language Film	Deepa Mehta	Nominated
23 June 2007	Italian National Syndicate of Film Journalists	Best Non-European Director	Deepa Mehta	Nominated
9 January 2007	National Board of Review	Top 5 Foreign Language Films	Deepa Mehta	Won
9 January 2007	National Board of Review	NBR Freedom of Expression Awards	Deepa Mehta (shared with Oliver Stone for World Trade Center)	Won
11 December 2006	New York Film Critics Online	Top 10 Films	Deepa Mehta	Won
11 December 2006	New York Film Critics Online	NYFCO Humanitarian Award	Deepa Mehta	Won
14 October 2006	Oslo Films from the South Festival	Best Silver Mirror Feature Film	Deepa Mehta	Won
20 March 2006	San Francisco International Asian American Film Festival	Best Narrative Audience Award	Deepa Mehta	Won
17 December 2006	Satellite Awards	Best Foreign Language Film	Deepa Mehta	Nominated
21 October 2005	Valladolid International Film Festival	Best Youth Jury Film – In Competition	Deepa Mehta	Won
21 October 2005	Valladolid International Film Festival	Best Golden Spike Film – In Competition	Deepa Mehta	Nominated
7 February 2006	Vancouver Film Critics Circle	Best Canadian director	Deepa Mehta	Won
7 February 2006	Vancouver Film Critics Circle	Best Canadian Actress	Lisa Ray	Won
10 March 2007	Young Artist Awards	Best Leading Young Actress in a Feature Film	Sarala Kariyawasam	Won
10 March 2007	Young Artist Awards	Best International Family Feature Film	Deepa Mehta	Won

== Controversies ==
Mehta had originally intended to direct Water in February 2000, with the actors Shabana Azmi, Nandita Das and Akshay Kumar. Her earlier film, Fire, however, had previously attracted hostility from conservative right-wing organizations, which objected to her subject matter and portrayal of conservative households in a negative light. Protestors organised protests and attacks on cinemas that screened that film. The day before filming of Water was due to begin, the crew was informed that there were complications with their location permits for filming. The following day, they learned that 2,000 protesters had stormed the ghats, destroying and burning the main film set and throwing the remnants into the Ganges in protest of what ultimately were revealed to be false accusations regarding the subject matter of the film. A right-wing politician Arun Pathak also organised a suicide protest to stop the film production.

The resulting tensions and economic setbacks led to several years of struggle as Mehta was eventually forced to film Water in Sri Lanka, rather than in India. Finally Mehta was able to make the film, but with a new cast and under a false title (River Moon) in 2003. The struggle to make the film was detailed by Mehta's daughter, Devyani Saltzman, in a non-fiction book, Shooting Water: A Mother-Daughter Journey and the Making of the Film.

== See also ==
- List of submissions to the 79th Academy Awards for Best Foreign Language Film
- List of Canadian submissions for the Academy Award for Best Foreign Language Film
- List of artistic depictions of Mahatma Gandhi

== Bibliography ==
- Saltzman, Devyani (2006). Shooting Water: A Mother-daughter Journey and the Making of a Film. Penguin Books India. ISBN 978-0-14-400102-6.
- Displacing Androcracy: Cosmopolitan Partnerships in Bapsi Sidhwa's Water
