= Peshotan Bhandara =

Peshotan Dhanji Bhouy Bhandara (1899–1961) was a Pakistani industrialist and politician who served as a member of the Constituent Assembly of Pakistan from 1952 to 1954.

== Career ==
Bhandara worked as a sales agent for a typewriter and later joined Murree Brewery as a director. He acquired the company in 1947 after the creation of Pakistan. Later, he served as the chairman of Murree Brewery. Bhandara died in 1961 in Lahore from a coronary thrombosis.

== Personal life ==
He had three children, including the industrialist and politician Minocher Bhandara and the novelist Bapsi Sidhwa.
