= Sabeena Gadihoke =

Indian author and professor

- Occupation: Professor

Academic background
- Education: Delhi University (B.A.); Jamia Millia Islamia (Master's in Mass Communication); Jawaharlal Nehru University (PhD)

Academic work
- Discipline: Media studies
- Sub-discipline: Digital media arts
- Institutions: Jamia Millia Islamia

Sabeena Gadihoke is an Indian academic and filmmaker. She is a professor of Digital Media Arts at A. J. K. Mass Communication Research Centre at Jamia Millia Islamia. She is the biographer of Homai Vyarawalla, India's first female photojournalist.

== Early life and education ==
Gadihoke holds a Bachelor's in History from Delhi University, a Master's in Mass Communication from the AJK MCRC, and a PhD from the School of Arts and Aesthetics, Jawaharlal Nehru University.

== Career ==
Prior to working in academia, Gadihoke produced educational films at the Mass Communication Research Center.

Gadihoke began teaching at Jamie Millia Islamia in 1990.

She is a founding member of the independent video collective Mediastorm. She received a grant from the India Foundation for the Arts in the late 1990s "to map out a feminist history of women photographers in the country".

== Publications ==
=== Books ===
- Camera Chronicles of Homai Vyarawalla. Mapin/Parzor Foundation. 2006.

=== Chapters ===
- Gadihoke, Sabeena (2012). "Secrets and Inner Voices: The Self and Subjectivity in Contemporary Indian Documentary". In Lebow, Alisa (ed.). The Cinema of Me: The Self and Subjectivity in First Person Documentary. London; New York: Wallflower Press. ISBN 978-0-231-16214-2.
- "All 'Dressed Up': Costume, Fashion and Identity in the Photographs of Homai Vyarawalla". Photography in India. Taylor & Francis. 2020-09-23. doi:10.4324/9781003103790-7/dressed-costume-fashion-identity-photographs-homai-vyarawalla-sabeena-gadihoke. Archived from the original on 2025-05-07.

=== Articles ===
- "Sensational Love Scandals and their After-lives: The Epic Tale of Nanavati". BioScope: South Asian Screen Studies. 2 (2): 103–218. 2011-07-01. doi:10.1177/097492761100200202. ISSN 0974-9276.

== Films ==
- Three Women and a Camera (1998)
- Tales of the Night Fairies (Shohini Ghosh, 2002)
