= Shohini Ghosh =

Professor at Jamia Millia Islamia

Shohini Ghosh is the Sajjad Zaheer Professor of media at the AJK Mass Communication Research Center, Jamia Millia Islamia. She is an essayist on popular culture and a documentary filmmaker. In a 2007 interview at the University of Minnesota, she provided reflections on her life and work.

== Early life and education ==
Ghosh received master's degrees from the MCRC and from Cornell University, and was a visiting professor at Cornell from 1990 to 1996. She spent time as a fellow at the University of Chicago, and taught as part of a variety of programs on sexuality, culture and society during the 1990s.

Ghosh began her documentary film work around that time, co-founding the Mediastorm Collective, an all-women documentary collective which in 1992 received the Chameli Devi Jain Award for Outstanding Work among Women Media Professionals. In 1998 she worked with Sabeena Gadihoke on Three Women and a Camera.

== Recent works ==
In 2002, Ghosh produced her first independent documentary, Tales of the Night Fairies, which won a Best Film award at Jeevika 2003 and was shown in 13 countries.

She has published a number of academic papers on gender, violence against women, and censorship in India, including "Censorship Myths and Imagined Harms" and "Looking in Fascination and Horror, Sex Violence and Spectatorship in India". Her 2010 monograph on the film Fire, published by Arsenal Pulp Press, is one of the first book length studies on this field-defining film.

In 2021, she was one of the participants in John Greyson's experimental short documentary film International Dawn Chorus Day.
