= Love's Rite =

2005 book by Ruth Vanita

Love's Rite: Same-Sex Marriage in India and the West
- First edition
- Author: Ruth Vanita
- Language: English
- Subject: Homosexuality in India, Recognition of same-sex unions, LGBT rights in India
- Publisher: Penguin Books India
- Publication date: 20 October 2005
- Publication place: India
- Pages: 384
- ISBN: 9780144000593

Love's Rite: Same-Sex Marriage in India and the West is a 2005 book by Indian author, academic and activist Ruth Vanita.

== Synopsis ==
The book is an analysis of the issues surrounding the recognition of same-sex unions, and the relevance of this debate in democratic societies such as India. Vanita asks "Why should the state's refusal to recognise a union as marriage mean that the union is not a marriage?" Vanita emphasises the history of recognition of same-sex love, and notes that, based on her expert knowledge of ancient Indian texts, same-sex love and relationships are "deeply rooted in Indian culture". Vanita discusses the cultural and legal implications of same-sex marriage in India and the West.

== Reception ==
In India Today Sonya Dutta Choudhury praised the book, describing it as "impeccably scholarly" and a "persuasive case". However, whilst praising the academic value of the book, Choudhury also wrote that "The book with its wide and wandering thesis is an excellent handbook for the activist or the student of gender. For the rest, reading Alan Hollinghurst's lyrical prose or Jeanette Winterson's intense drama is an infinitely more enjoyable way of recognising the reality of same-sex love and a consequent case for marriage"

Terry Castle, Professor at Stanford University and editor of The Literature of Lesbianism also gave a positive review, describing the book as "absorbing" and noting how it "shows how subtly and imaginatively Indian attitudes toward same-sex unions have evolved over the centuries-and offers a marvelously global perspective characterised by profound historical understanding, impeccable scholarship, and a rare and delightful precision of feeling"
