= Minocher Bhandara =

Pakistani industrialist and member of National Assembly of Pakistan

Member of the National Assembly of Pakistan
- In office April 14, 1972 – March 7, 1977

Personal details
- Born: 1937
- Died: June 15, 2008 (aged 70–71) Islamabad, Pakistan
- Party: Pakistan Muslim League (Q)
- Children: Isphanyar Bhandara
- Parent: P.D. Bhandara (father)
- Relatives: Bapsi Sidhwa (sister)
- Occupation: Businessman, politician
- Nickname: Minoo

Minocher Bhandara (1937–June 15, 2008), commonly known as M.P. Bhandara, was a Pakistani industrialist and politician who served as a member of the National Assembly of Pakistan from 1972 to 1977 and from 2002 to 2007.

== Family ==
He belonged to the small Gujarati-speaking Zoroastrian community. Bhandara was the brother of Pakistani novelist, Bapsi Sidhwa. His father was a saleagent for a typewriter, later he joined the Murree Brewery as a director, created by British during era in 1960. He bought the majority share in the company in 1947, the two countries separated.

His son, Isphanyar Bhandara, is the current CEO of Murree Brewery.

== Career ==
He was the architect and owner of one of the most successful and durable business conglomerates in Pakistan. Amongst his companies was the Murree Brewery, which his father had bought a controlling share in during the British Empire in the 1940s.

== Politics ==
He leaves behind a legacy of enlightened political activism. Bhandara, was active as a minority representative and served as MNA from November 16, 2002 to November 15, 2007 affiliated with Pakistan Muslim League (Q). Before that, he had also served as a member of National Assembly of Pakistan from April 14, 1972 to March 7, 1977 during Zulfiqar Ali Bhutto regime.

Minoo also wrote articles in the country's English language newspapers.

== Death ==
He died in Islamabad, Pakistan on Sunday June 15, 2008 at the age of 71, due to complications as a result of a serious car accident in China several weeks earlier on April 23, 2008.
