= Sarala Kariyawasam =

Child actress from Sri Lanka

- Born: Sarala Kariyawasam; 1996 (age 29–30); Galle, Sri Lanka
- Occupations: Actor; television personality
- Spouse: Eranga Jeewantha (m. 2018)
- Children: 2
- Awards: Best Young Performer in an International Feature Film (Water)

Sarala Kariyawasam, who hails from Galle, is a former Sri Lankan child actress. A student of Sangamitta Balika Vidyalaya, Sarala is the first Sri Lankan child artist to make an international debut. Currently she hosts a children's TV show in Sri Lanka.

== Biography ==
Sarala's favourite subjects are English, mathematics and science. She is the youngest in her family, with an older sister and brother.

== Career ==
Hollywood's Young Artist Award foundation has presented the Best Young Performer in an International Feature Film Award to Sarala, for her role of a child widow (Chuyia) in the award-winning film-maker Deepa Mehta's controversial film, Water.

The film is about the harsh treatment received by widows in the 1930s in India. She played the role of a child bride (Chuiya) who lost her husband at the age of eight and sent to an ashram to live with other widows, leading an austere life, sleeping on concrete floors, begging for a living and sometimes being sold as prostitutes to the Brahmin gentry across the river. She befriends Kalyani, stunningly beautiful other widow played by Lisa Ray.

Water has been acclaimed as a regional victory and was shot entirely in Sri Lanka, in partnership with Chandran Rutnam's Film Location Services Lanka Limited and the National Film Corporation. Sarala was selected from out of fifty girls and auditioned by Mehta for this challenging role. She was eight years when she acted but proved to be the most suitable to take up the lead role of the film according to Mehta. Before taking up her role in Water, she has acted in several stage plays in school and had recently won first place in an all island dancing, singing and speech competition. She says that she wants to concentrate on her studies, and has turned down many offers of acting.

"Sarala performed an absolutely outstanding role in a brilliant film that should have been given more recognition by Hollywood," said Maureen Dragone, president of the foundation, which is holding its 28th consecutive year of awards recognizing and honoring talented young child artists all over the world.

Sarala, an extremely bright girl, who did not know a word of English or Hindi, and had to learn all dialogues by heart, but ultimately acted so well that many critics were stunned by her performance. She was able to pick up both the languages within a few weeks to the amazement of the director. As result, they were able to finish the film within three months. The biggest task Sarala had to face with accepting the role was to shave her head. Having previously long hair, she agreed to do so to suit her character for Water.

The film was presented at the Toronto International Film Festival a critic said, "The film is centred by the extraordinary performance of Sarala as the young Chuyia, a girl whose spirit remains unbroken. Her refusal to bend to her plight carries considerable emotive power and elevates Water from a harsh tale of deprivation into one of hope and the possibility of overcoming. Mehta has made a film for the ages."

A British critic said of the film:

Sarala as Chuihya is a sheer delight to watch; her innocence and bewilderment of the circumstances before her somehow mirror that of our own. Her childlike wonder a revelation, more so when you realise Sarala doesn't speak a word of Hindi or English and learnt all of her lines phonetically. Ray plays Kalyani with a subtle innocence - of beauty conditioned to be submissive, whilst Biswas as Shakuntala is the newly enlightened conscience of the movie, the rambunctious Chuihya its soul. .…. An immense movie, daunting at times yet unforgettably touching; the images of Kalyani and Chuihya will stay with you for a long while afterwards.
