= Isphanyar M. Bhandara =

Pakistani politician

- اسفنیار ایم بھنڈارا

Member of the National Assembly of Pakistan
- Incumbent
- Assumed office 29 February 2024
- Constituency: Reserved seat for minorities

Member of the National Assembly of Pakistan
- In office 1 June 2013 – 31 May 2018
- Constituency: Reserved seat for minorities

Personal details
- Party: PMLN (2013-present)

Isphanyar M. Bhandara (Urdu: اسفند یار ایم بھنڈارا; born 18 November 1972) is a Pakistani politician who is an incumbent member of the National Assembly of Pakistan since February 2024. He is serving as Federal parliamentary secretary for Ministry of SAFON. He is the current CEO of Murree Brewery.

== Family ==
Isphanyar M. Bandhara is the son of late Minocher Bhandara, and grandson of late Peshotan Bhandara. He belongs to the Parsi community of Pakistan. He was born in Karachi. He got his MBA Administration Degree from USA.

== Political career ==
Previously, he was a member of the National Assembly of Pakistan from June 2013 to May 2018. He was also a member of the Manifesto Committee Pakistan Muslim League-N as an expert on minorities rights in Pakistan. He was elected to the National Assembly of Pakistan as a candidate of Pakistan Muslim League (N) on a seat reserved for minorities in the 2013 Pakistani general election. He was a member of the Manifesto Commission of Pakistan Muslim League (N) for Minorities.

== Business career ==
Bhandara is the chief executive officer of Murree Brewery.
