= The Last White Knight =

2012 film directed by Paul Saltzman

The Last White Knight is a documentary by Canadian filmmaker Paul Saltzman about his meetings with Delay de la Beckwith, son of Byron de la Beckwith, who assassinated Medgar Evers. In the film, Saltzman also interviewed Harry Belafonte, Morgan Freeman and others active in the civil rights movement. Belafonte's line, “People tell me that things have changed. And yet, I don’t trust Mississippi", is a key line from the film.

The film was inspired by Saltzman's first encounter with the younger de la Beckwith in the early 1960s and their discussions decades later, following the unsealing of the Mississippi State Sovereignty Commission's archives, are the core of the film whose title comes from de la Beckwith's standing as the last member of his family involved with the Klan.

The documentary screened at the 2012 Toronto International Film Festival and the 2013 Boston Jewish Film Festival.
