= Ruth Vanita =

Indian academic, activist and author

- Known for: Scholarship on British and Indian literary history; studies of gender and sexuality; work on Hindu philosophy

Academic background
- Education: University of Delhi (BA, MA, PhD)

Academic work
- Discipline: English literature, Gender studies, Sexuality studies
- Institutions: University of Delhi; University of Montana
- Notable works: Manushi: A Journal about Women and Society (co-founder)

Ruth Vanita is an Indian academic, activist and author who specialises in British and Indian literary history with a focus on gender and sexuality studies. She also teaches and writes on Hindu philosophy.

== Early life and education ==
Vanita earned her BA, MA and PhD in English at Delhi University.

== Career ==
From 1994 to 1997 Vanita was Reader in the Department of English at Delhi University. She is now a professor of English and World Cultures at the University of Montana, where she directs the program in South & South-East Asian Studies.

While living in Delhi in 1978, Vanita co-founded Manushi: A Journal about Women and Society, a journal that combined academic research and grassroots activism. She served as the journal's unpaid, volunteer co-editor from 1979 to 1991.

== Major publications ==
=== Books ===
- 1994: A Play of Light: Selected Poems
- 1996: Sappho and the Virgin Mary: Same-Sex Love and the English Literary Imagination
- 2005: Love's Rite: Same-Sex Marriage in India and the West
- 2005: Gandhi's Tiger and Sita's Smile: Essays on Gender, Sexuality and Culture
- 2012: Gender, Sex and the City: Urdu Rekhti Poetry in India 1780-1870
- 2017: Dancing with the Nation: Courtesans in Bombay Cinema
- 2020: Memory of Light (a novel)
- 2022: The Dharma of Justice: Debates on Gender Varna and Species
- 2023: The Broken Rainbow: Poems and Translations
- 2024: A Slight Angle (a novel)

=== Edited volumes ===
- 1991 (ed. with Madhu Kishwar): In Search of Answers: Indian Women's Voices from Manushi
- 2000 (ed. with Saleem Kidwai): Same-Sex love in India: Readings from Literature and History
- 2002 (ed.): Queering India: Same-Sex Love and Eroticism in Indian Culture and Society
- 2014 (ed.): India and the World: Postcolonialism, Translation and Indian Literature – Essays in Honour of Professor Harish Trivedi

=== Translations ===
- 1994: Yadav, Rajendra: Strangers on the Roof, translated by Ruth Vanita, Penguin India, 1994 (updated edition with a new introduction 2014)
- 1997: Detha, Vijay Dan. Dilemma and Other Stories
- 2003: Bhandari, Mannu: The Great Feast (Mahabhoj)
- 2006: Sharma, Pandey Bechan ("Ugra"): Chocolate and Other Stories on Male-Male Desire
- 2007: About Me (Apni Khabar) (autobiography of Pande Bechan Sharma Ugra)
- 2008: The Co-Wife and Other Stories by Premchand
- 2013: Alone Together: Selected Stories of Mannu Bhandari, Rajee Seth and Archana Varma
- 2021: My Family by Mahadevi Varma
