= Murree beer =

Pakistani beer brand

- Type: Lager, Ale and Stout
- Manufacturer: Murree Brewery, Pakistan
- Country of origin: Pakistan
- Introduced: 1860
- Alcohol by volume: 6 %, 8%, 10%, 12%
- Variants: Murree's Classic Lager; Murree's Millennium Brew; Murree's Special Strong
- Website: www.murreebrewery.com

Murree beer is a Pakistani beer manufactured by Murree Brewery. Murree beer is the most popular beer of Pakistan as Murree brewery is the only producer of beer in Pakistan while legal import of foreign beers is prohibited in Pakistan. It is often known as "Pakistan's legendary beer". Telegraph called it a "world class lager". Murree Beer was awarded a medal for excellence at the Philadelphia Exhibition in 1876 and in the 1867 World Fair.

== History ==
After the suppression of the Indian Rebellion of 1857, the British Crown formally took over the administration of the Indian subcontinent from the East India Company, establishing a structured administration based in the Punjab. To meet the demand for beer among British military and civilian personnel, the Murree Brewery was established in 1860.

The peak of the brewery's production was during World War II, when Murree produced 1.6 million gallons of Murree beer a year. The boom ended when Pakistan achieved independence from Britain in 1947, with partition of India depriving Murree of a large market of Indian drinkers.

Muree sales and distribution suffered after the prohibition of alcohol began in 1977, which gradually intensified under the rule of Muhammad Zia-ul-Haq.

At the beginning of the COVID-19 pandemic in Pakistan, Murree's brewery was closed for several weeks and all production and distribution ceased during that period; diminished sales resulted in only 50% of expected profits for the year, but this was in contrast to many competitors becoming insolvent. Like many breweries around the world, Murree converted its operations to produce alcohol-based hand sanitizer to support public health efforts.

== See also ==
- Bali Hai Beer
