= Madhu Kishwar =

Indian activist and writer (born 1951)

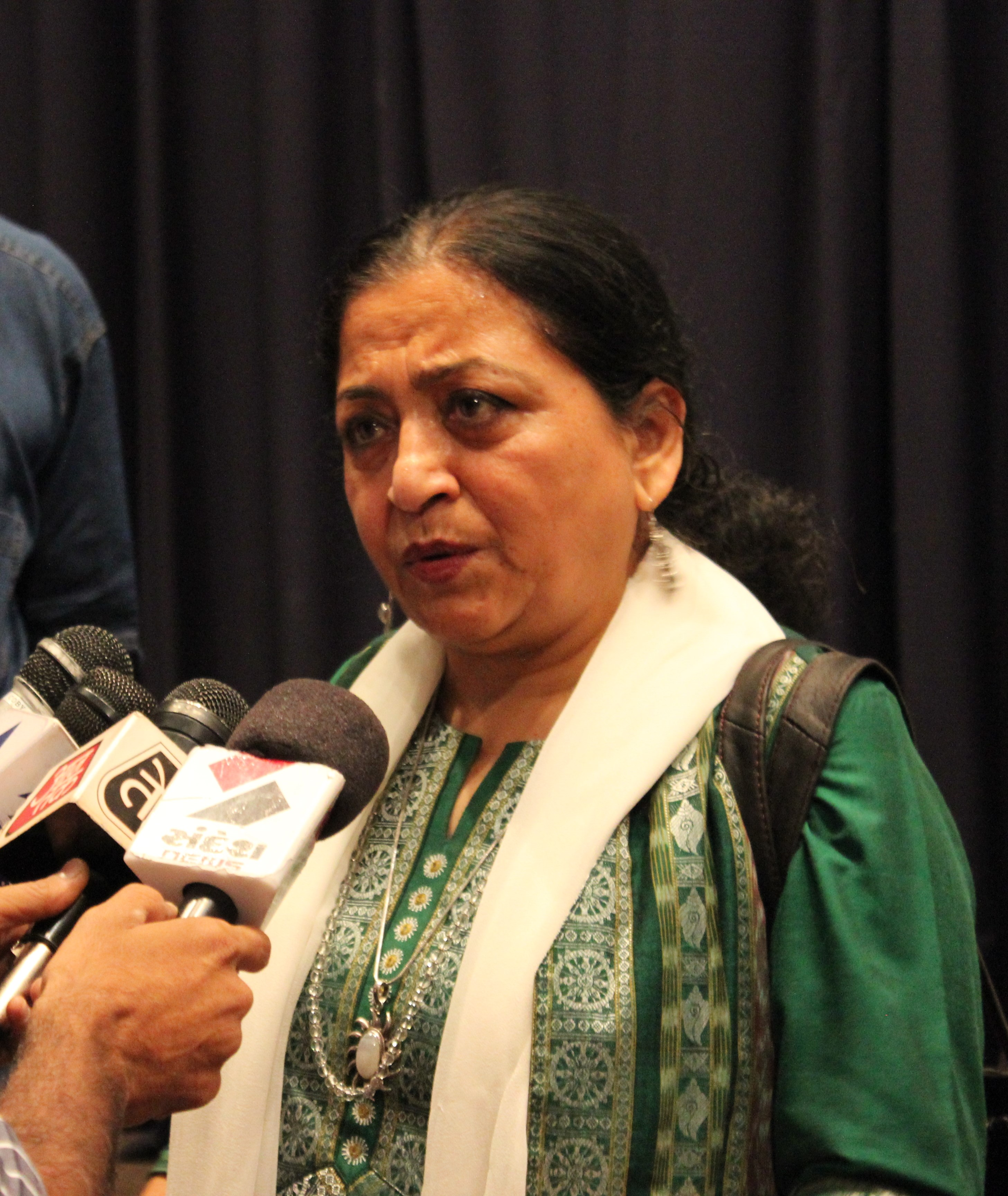
- Born: 1951 (age 74–75)
- Education: Delhi University, Jawaharlal Nehru University, Delhi
- Occupations: Professor, Activist, Author
- Organization: Centre for the Study of Developing Societies
- Website: www.manushi.in

Madhu Purnima Kishwar is an Indian academic and Hindutva commentator. She is currently employed as a chair Professor in the Indian Council of Social Science Research. Kishwar along with fellow-academic Ruth Vanita co-founded the journal Manushi.

Whilst her earlier work were favorably received by the academia and fellow activists, her counterparts disassociated from her post the '90s, once she embraced the ideology of Hindutva. (Note: In India, Hindutva is the predominant form of Hindu nationalism. According to the Concise Oxford Dictionary of Politics and International Relations, "Hindutva ... refers to the ideology of Hindu nationalists, stressing the common culture of the inhabitants of the Indian subcontinent. ... Modern politicians have attempted to play down the racial and anti-Muslim aspects of Hindutva ... but the term has Fascist undertones.")

She has been awarded the Chameli Devi Jain Award for Outstanding Women Mediaperson in 1985.

== Early life and education ==
Kishwar was born in 1951 in Delhi, into a family of partition refugees from present-day Pakistan. Her father's family came from Lahore, while her mother's came from Peshawar. (Note: Kishwar states that her mother's family lived in the Peshawar and Rawalpindi districts, and that during the 1947 tribal invasion of Kashmir her mother was airlifted from Srinagar, where part of her family lived, to a refugee camp in Delhi.) She graduated from Miranda House in Delhi, where she was the President of the Student's Union. She received her postgraduate degree in history from Jawaharlal Nehru University in Delhi.

== Career ==
She was a professor and a senior fellow at the Centre for the Study of Developing Societies (CSDS), until retiring in 2016. Following her retirement, she asserted that the institution was a chaotic fiefdom of the chosen few and alleged that the higher echelons of CSDS were ideologically biased towards left wing politics, and had treated her unfairly for years due to ideological differences, and supposedly, even robbed her of a legitimate government awarded scholarship. The institute rejected the allegations.

She then joined the Indian Council of Social Science Research as the Maulana Azad Professor. In 2017, she was appointed to the Academic Council of the School of Art and Aesthetics of Jawaharlal Nehru University. Students perceived her appointment to be politically motivated, and questioned her domain-expertise and protested in large numbers. Kishwar rejected the charges, describing them as whining of the leftist intellectuals, who were losing their clout. [Questionable Sources]

=== Manushi and feminism ===
Kishwar, along with Ruth Vanita, were the founding-editors of Manushi, a highly acclaimed journal in the domain of women's studies in India. Established to bridge the gap between academic discourse and popular activism by raising awareness of gender inequalities through activism on the ground, it has been one of the longest-running and most-influential women's periodicals in South Asia to the extent of being heavily instrumental in setting the agenda for women-right-movements. Manushi has been described by Amartya Sen as "a pioneering feminist journal". Her books and miscellaneous writings in the topic area have been also quite favorably received.

Notably, Kishwar does not self-identify as a feminist. Kishwar's (self-proclaimed) reasons behind the disapproval of feminism aligns with that of the postcolonial feminist theory - perceiving liberal feminism as a monolithic western entity which discounts indigenous ways of life and actively incorporates a western framework.

Anita Anantharam, an associate professor of Women's Studies at University of Florida, writing over Feminist Media Studies in 2009, deems Kishwar to subscribe to a brand of aggressively nationalist feminism that takes a highly holistic view of the local society, culture and traditions. She notes that as the editorial board of Manushi thinned out over the years for varied reasons and the journal came under near-absolute stewardship of Kishwar, it chose to embrace the contemporaneous rise of the right-wing-nationalism through the realms of Hindutva. This led to the introduction of religious and communal discourses into a hitherto secular and non-polarized space which vocally urged for a return to a golden atavistic past and amplified the "hierarchies of "East" versus "West", Indian womanhood versus western feminism, and Hindu versus Muslim identity" from the lenses of religion and ethno-nationalism. (Note: She also rejects any static interpretation of religious scriptures in her bid of arguing for a highly elevated status of women in the Hindu culture.)

Kishwar has since criticized her fellow feminists urging for laws to prohibit the Hindu practice of Sati, instead focusing on the potential hampering of freedom to undergo death by a means of their choice and the implications of a secular state trying to regulate religious customs; she had also attacked other avenues of feminist activism from anti-dowry legislation to purported abolition of khaps and introduction of female quota bills, from within the Hindu way of life, arguing for a more nuanced and cultural approach, if at all. Her views have been challenged and rejected by numerous other feminists.

She was also one of the fiercest critics of the highly acclaimed film Fire, which focused a spotlight on the lesbian community in India. Deeming that film as the ramblings of a self-hating-Indian that was meant to stereotype and vilify Hindus, she mocked the queer rights movements as a Western import that leaned contrary to the ethos of Hindu public life and middle class values. (Note: Kishwar believes that Indian society had been always far more comfortable with homoerotic strains of relationships in private than other civilizations or societies. Thus, although Indian society does not exoticize homoeroticism in the public sphere, there is no need for any radical activism in the domain.) Gradually, in the process, she joined a newly evolving group of Hindutva scholars in asserting biases in the western and Marxists scholarship of Indic religions. Manushi served as a reference during the California textbook controversy over Hindu history et al.—Anantharam notes a heavy intermingling of Hindutva and her works by the middle 2000s.

Anantharam notes that almost all contemporary feminists have since disowned their roles in the magazine to avoid any association with this hyper-nationalistic cum Hindu fervor.

Of late, Madhu Kishwar has been an emphatic critic of the newer waves of "western-derived" mainstream feminist movements in India; expressing the view that these are Fascist endeavors reeking of dominating and oppressing the male gender. She has lodged legal petitions arguing for dilution of anti-rape laws to mitigate bias against males and has been also highly skeptical of the motivations of foreign-funded NGOs working for the causes of women. Some scholars have now come to recognize Kishwar as a former feminist who has since turned into an ally of anti-mainstream-feminist causes.

== Controversies ==
Kishwar had previously been noted for her adulation of Narendra Modi, to the extent of comparing him with Mahatma Gandhi. She had also written a book that absolved him, a then prime-ministerial candidate of any involvement in the 2002 Gujarat riots and praised him as a non-communal politician. Incidentally she used to be a vocal critic of Modi.

In 2020, Kishwar faced backlash on Twitter for her misogynistic remarks against actress Rhea Chakraborty. Critics condemned Kishwar for derogatory comments, such as labeling Rhea as a "fortune huntress mafia moll" and suggesting she was used as "sex bait to trap rich men" by her father.

Kishwar has been accused by left-leaning media outlets of aiding in the propagation of allegedly communal material and to have propagated fake news over numerous occasions, via her Twitter handle.

In July 2022, she was booked by Uttar Pradesh Police for spreading misinformation on social media using old video of a road incident from 2017.

=== Allegations against Narendra Modi ===
In March 2026, Kishwar wrote a post on social media X about Modi, which became instantly viral and was subject of much debate and controversy on social media and around. Since then, she has been making repeated allegations related to sexual misconduct against Modi, generating much political heat.

Certain FIRs and criminal cases have been registered against Kishwar after her allegations against Modi. On 20 April 2026, an FIR was registered against Kishwar by Chandigarh Police over alleged circulation of misleading content online.

Similarly, a BJP member has filed a complaint case in Varanasi Court against such allegations.

== Works ==
- In Search of Answers: Indian Women's Voices (with Ruth Vanita, Zed Books, 1984). ISBN 0862321786.
- Gandhi and Women (Manushi Prakashan, 1986). ASIN B0007BRY8S.
- Women Bhakta Poets: Manushi (Manushi Publications, 1989). ASIN B001RPVZVU.
- The Dilemma And Other Stories (with Ruth Vanitha, Manushi Prakashan, 1997). ISBN 8186573003.
- Religion at the service of nationalism and other essays (Oxford University Press, 1998). ISBN 0195641612.
- Off the Beaten Track: Rethinking Gender Justice for Indian Women (Oxford University Press, 2002). ISBN 0195658310.
- Deepening Democracy: Challenges of Governance and Globalization in India (Oxford University Press, 2006). ISBN 0195683528.
- Zealous Reformers, Deadly Laws: Battling Stereotypes (SAGE, 2008). ISBN 0761936378.
- Modi, Muslims and Media: Voices from Narendra Modi's Gujarat (Manushi Publications, 2014). ISBN 978-81-929352-0-1.
- The Girl from Kathua: A Sacrificial Victim of Ghazwa-e-Hind (Garuda Prakashan, 2023). ISBN 979-8885750929.
