= Water (novel) =

2006 novel by author Bapsi Sidhwa

- First edition
- Author: Bapsi Sidhwa
- Language: English
- Publisher: Milkweed Editions
- Publication date: 2006
- Publication place: United States
- Media type: Print (hardback & paperback)
- Pages: 237 pp (first edition, paperback)

Water is a novel by author Bapsi Sidhwa that was published in 2006.

== Plot summary ==
Water is set in 1938, when India was still under the colonial rule of the British, and when the marriage of children to older men was still accepted. Following Hindu tradition, when a man died, his widow could be forced to spend the rest of her life in a widow's ashram, an institution for widows to make amends for the sins from her previous life that supposedly caused her husband's death.

Chuyia (Sarala) is an eight-year-old girl who has just lost her husband. She is deposited in the ashram for Hindu widows to spend the rest of her life in renunciation. She befriends Kalyani who is forced into prostitution to support the ashram, Shakuntala, one of the widows, and Narayan, a young and charming upper-class follower of Mahatma Gandhi and of Gandhism.

For a full length summary see: plot summary.

== Film ==
- Deepa Mehta's 2005 film, Water. Author Bapsi Sidhwa wrote the 2006 novel based upon the film, Water: A Novel, published by Milkweed Press.
