= Percy Saltzman =

Canadian meteorologist (1915–2007)

- Born: Percy Philip Saltzman; March 11, 1915; Winnipeg, Canada
- Died: January 15, 2007 (aged 91); Toronto, Canada
- Occupations: Meteorologist and television personality
- Spouses: Rose Kogan (m. 1935; died 1988) Grace Audrey Ford (née Modeland) (m. 1990)
- Children: 2 (including Paul Saltzman)
- Relatives: Devyani Saltzman (granddaughter)

Percy Philip Saltzman, CM (March 15, 1915 – January 15, 2007) was a meteorologist and television personality best remembered for being the first weatherman in English-speaking Canadian television history.

As a pioneer in weather forecasting, he was the first Canadian to present the weather in satellite and radar images and to give road reports and forest fires. He also hosted numerous public affairs programs on CBC and, in 1969, along with Lloyd Robertson, he hosted ten days of coverage of the first Moon landing for CBC Television.

== Early life ==
Born in Winnipeg, his family moved to Neudorf, Saskatchewan, to operate a general store. In 1925, they moved to Vancouver, British Columbia where he studied at King George Secondary School and the University of British Columbia.

He was the eldest of four children of Solomon and Elizabeth Saltzman. His father and mother had immigrated to Canada from Ukraine in 1911. He was a good student and won the Governor-General Lord Willingdon's Silver Medal for coming in first in the province in his final high school exams.

In the 1930s he was a political activist and once shared a stage with Stafford Cripps at a Vancouver socialist rally. Saltzman maintained his left-wing convictions into later life. His son, Paul, said of him "(h)e came out of the Depression in Western Canada and that kind of skewed his values. He was an armchair socialist, but that didn't translate into action."

After their Vancouver grocery store failed, Saltzman's parents moved to Los Angeles along with his youngest brother, Kenneth Saltzman and he rarely saw them. His younger brother, Morris Saltzman remained in Vancouver until his death in 1988. For his activism in bringing different religious and cultural factions to respect one another and work together, Morris received the Order of Canada several years before Percy was so honoured.

Saltzman moved to Montreal and studied medicine at McGill University School of Medicine until 1935 when he met and married his first wife, Rose Kogan (1911-1988), in 1935. He dropped out of medical school around this time and took a series of odd jobs such as working in a clothing store, an envelope opener in a puzzle contest and as a waiter before entering the printing business. He then moved with her to Toronto in 1937 where he worked as a Linotype operator at Eveready Printing for several years. In 1943, he became a meteorology officer for the weather service of the federal government and was attached to the British Commonwealth Air Training Plan for the remainder of World War II. He would retain his position with the Dominion Weather Service for 25 years. It was essentially an extension of this function for him to be given the opportunity to bring his expertise first to radio beginning in 1947 and later to television as the Canadian Broadcasting Corporation, another Canadian government agency, embarked on this new medium.

"He kept that job at the weather office the entire time he was on television with CBC because he didn't think TV was secure. He wasn't sure that TV would last," said his grandson, CBC reporter Aaron Saltzman.

== Television career ==
Saltzman was the first person to appear on CBC Toronto (CBLT) English-language television when the service was launched on September 8, 1952 (the bilingual CBFT in Montreal had opened two days earlier). Initially, he gave the weather on a puppet show, Uncle Chichimus and Hollyhock, but he soon delivered forecasts on Stop Watch and Listen and then became co-host of Tabloid, the CBC's daily current affairs and interview show His first major story was Hurricane Hazel which hit Toronto just over two years after his television career began. He was a staple at CBC through the following decades and was initially paid $10 for each appearance. While pursuing what he considered a sideline career on television, he remained with the Dominion Weather Service and rose to the position of head of the verification section finally leaving in 1968 to join the CBC full-time. During his stint at CBC he hosted a multitude of special shows and also developed into one of Canada's best interviewers. He left the network in 1972 to become a co-host of CTV's new morning show Canada AM.

His presentations, before the introduction of such amenities as computer-enhanced satellite displays and graphics, involved a blackboard and chalk as he drew maps, suns, clouds, snowflakes, fronts, etc., ending with his signature toss of the chalk, and his "and that's the weather picture" as he caught it. (He is said to have always caught it, although he admitted having dropped it once, but only once.) Saltzman once estimated he had done 9,000 weather forecasts on radio and television and interviewed more than 1,000 people. He used no notes or teleprompters relating his forecasts entirely from memory.

After leaving CTV, he worked at CITY-TV in 1974 (Free For All), then he became a freelancer until 1980 when he joined Global TV for the next two years.

He also broadcast local radio weather reports in Toronto at CBC Radio, CKEY, and CFRB.

== Later life ==
In 1990 he married his second wife, Grace Audrey Ford (née Modeland) (1930-2018). He has two sons from his first marriage, Earl (born 1942) and Paul (born 1943). His brother Kenneth lives in Los Angeles. His grandson Aaron Saltzman is a reporter, first with CBC Television in Calgary and now in Toronto. Saltzman's only granddaughter, Devyani Saltzman, is the author of the internationally published literary memoir: Shooting Water and is the daughter of Paul Saltzman and filmmaker Deepa Mehta. Paul Saltzman is an Emmy Award-winning film and TV producer and director whose most recent film was the documentary Prom Night in Mississippi, featuring actor Morgan Freeman. Saltzman was the nephew of Communist Party of Canada organizer Sam Carr.

Saltzman died on January 15, 2007, in Toronto. He is buried at York Cemetery in Toronto.

== Awards/Recognitions ==
- President, ACTRA-Toronto, 1960
- TV Guide Award, 1960
- Queen's Jubilee Medal, 2002
- TV Career Cited in Environment Canada's Top 20th Century Weather Events, 2002
- Order of Canada, 2002
- Canadian "Who's Who" 2003
- Canadian Broadcast Hall of Fame, 2004
