= Paul Saltzman =

Canadian film and television producer and director

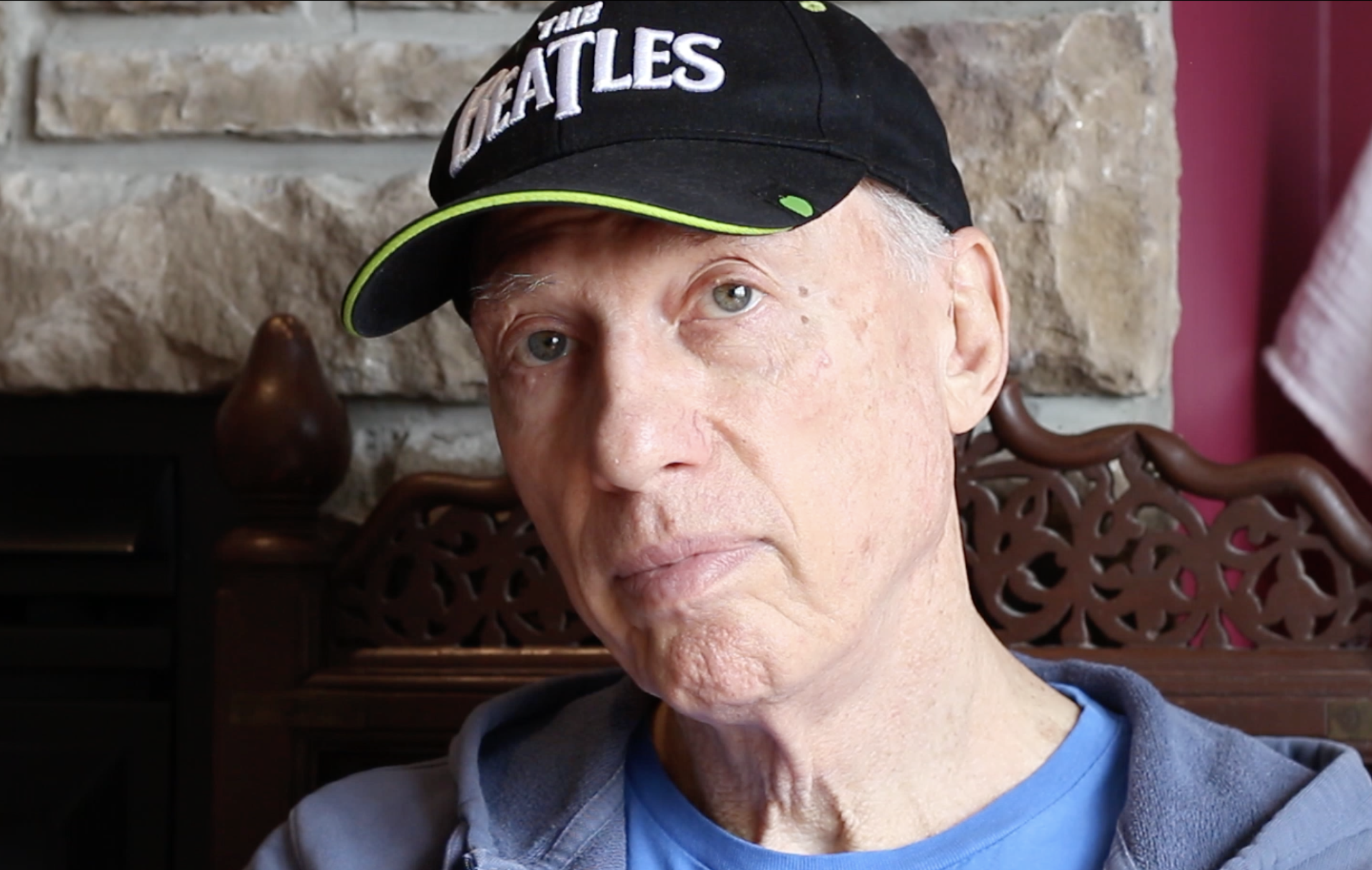
- Saltzman in 2024
- Born: 1943 (age 82–83)
- Occupation: Film director
- Years active: 1976–present
- Notable work: Meeting the Beatles in India; Prom Night in Mississippi; The Last White Knight
- Spouse: Deepa Mehta (m. 1973; div. 1983)
- Children: Devyani Saltzman (daughter)
- Parent: Percy Saltzman

Paul Saltzman (born 1943) is a Canadian film and television producer and director. A two-time Emmy Award-recipient, he has been credited on more than 300 films, both dramas and documentaries.

The 2008 documentary feature, Prom Night in Mississippi, featuring actor Morgan Freeman, premiered at the 2009 Sundance Film Festival. His feature documentary, The Last White Knight—Is Reconciliation Possible? premiered at TIFF (Toronto International Film Festival) in 2012. It features Morgan Freeman, Harry Belafonte, Delay de la Beckwith (son of Byron De La Beckwith) as well as Saltzman himself. His most recent film is the feature documentary Meeting the Beatles in India filmed in India, Canada, USA and England is his most personal film tracing his life-changing journey to India, learning meditation and spending a week with the Beatles at an ashram in Rishikesh. He is also founder, CEO and president of the charitable, non-profit organization Moving Beyond Prejudice, which works with police forces, students, educators, youth-at-risk and community groups.

== Early life ==
He was born in 1943 the son of Percy Saltzman, Canada's first English-speaking TV weatherman, and Rose Cohen. After briefly studying mathematics and science, he did congressional civil rights lobbying in Washington, D.C., and in the summer of 1965 he did voter registration work in Mississippi as part of the Student Nonviolent Coordinating Committee (SNCC), which would later lead him to go back to the area to explore the concept of prejudice and racism with his first documentary feature film, Prom Night in Mississippi. He lives in the Toronto area, and has one daughter, Devyani Saltzman, a writer and literary curator. His ex-wife is director and screenwriter Deepa Mehta. His partner is Anne Peace, a writer and joyologist.

== The Beatles ==
In 1968, at the age of 23, he traveled to India for the first time as sound engineer on the National Film Board of Canada's Juggernaut documentary. He studied meditation to recover after his girlfriend had broken up with him, by mail. He learned meditation at the Maharishi Mahesh Yogi's ashram in the holy city of Rishikesh, India, The Beatles were coincidentally also visiting the ashram. He saw them sitting at a table and asked to join them. Paul McCartney drew up a chair. While there, he spent time with and photographed the Beatles, Donovan, Mia and Prudence Farrow and Mike Love. His photos have been judged "some of the best intimate shots" ever taken of John Lennon, Paul McCartney, George Harrison and Ringo Starr, and have been seen in galleries worldwide. A permanent exhibition of his The Beatles in India photographs can be seen above the retail units in the departure lounge of Liverpool John Lennon Airport.

In 2000, Saltzman released a book of his photographs, The Beatles in Rishikesh, with Penguin-Putnam; and in 2006 he self-published a deluxe limited edition box set, The Beatles in India. In 2018, the 50th anniversary of the Beatles time at the ashram, Insight Editions published a hardcover trade edition of 'The Beatles in India'.

One of the most memorable things Saltzman absorbed during his conversations and life-changing stay with The Beatles was George Harrison's words: "Like we're The Beatles, after all, aren't we? We have all the money you could ever dream of. We have all the fame you could ever wish for. But it isn't love. It isn't health. It isn't peace inside, is it?"

Saltzman has been to India over 60 times. He led special tours of India in 2013 and 2014, and again in 2016 and 2018. In 2023 and 2026 his tours included both India and the Kingdom of Bhutan. Called "India with Paul Saltzman: A Fusion of Colour, Music & Soul", it shares his love of and favourite places in India and Bhutan. Included is how India impacted The Beatles, and led to the group's most creative musical period.

== Film and TV career ==
Saltzman began his film and television career at the Canadian Broadcasting Corporation as a researcher, interviewer and on-air host, and then moved to the National Film Board of Canada. He assisted in the launch of a new film format as second-unit director and production manager of the first IMAX film, produced for the Osaka Expo '70. In 1972, he produced and directed his first film, a half-hour documentary on Bo Diddley.

In 1967 and again in 1972, Saltzman interviewed Buckminster Fuller on film. On this second occasion, Fuller told Saltzman "You changed my idea of the 60's generation. Before I met you, I thought it was a lost generation."

In 1973, Saltzman founded Sunrise Films Limited. He produced and directed documentaries for the next decade, including the award-winning series Spread Your Wings. His work included producing, directing, writing, editing, cinematography and sound recording. In 1983, he turned to drama, producing and directing the premiere of HBO's Family Playhouse and a special for American Playhouse. That year, he co-created and produced the family action-adventure television series Danger Bay; the hit CBC–Disney Channel series ran for six years and 123 episodes.

Since then he has produced television series such as My Secret Identity, Matrix and Max Glick, as well as miniseries and movies of the week. He co-produced the feature film Map of the Human Heart, an international epic directed by Vincent Ward, starring Jason Scott Lee, Anne Parillaud, Patrick Bergin, John Cusack and Jeanne Moreau. He also executive produced Martha, Ruth & Edie as well as Sam & Me, which received an Honorable Mention in competition for the Camera d'Or at the Cannes Film Festival.

In 2020, his feature documentary based on his experiences with the Beatles in India, 'Meeting the Beatles in India' was released.

Saltzman is a member of the Directors Guild of Canada and the Academy of Canadian Cinema and Television.
