= Bapsi Sidhwa =

Pakistani writer (1938–2024)

Bapsi Sidhwa بیپسی سدھوا
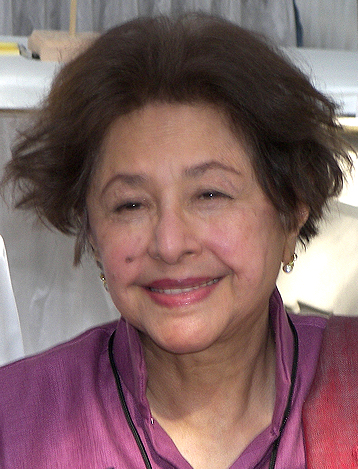
- Sidhwa in 2008 (Yo)
- Born: 11 August 1938; Karachi, Sind Province, British India
- Died: 25 December 2024 (aged 86); Houston, Texas, U.S.
- Occupation: Author
- Children: 5
- Relatives: Minocher Bhandara (brother); Isphanyar M. Bhandara (nephew)
- Writing career
- Notable awards: Sitara-i-Imtiaz (Star of Excellence) Award by the Government of Pakistan (1991)

Bapsi Sidhwa (Urdu: بیپسی سدھوا; 11 August 1938 – 25 December 2024) was a Pakistani novelist who wrote in English and was resident in the United States.

Sidhwa was best known for her collaborative work with Indo-Canadian filmmaker Deepa Mehta: Sidhwa wrote both the 1991 novel Ice Candy Man which served as the basis for Mehta's 1998 film Earth as well as the 2006 novel Water: A Novel, on which Mehta's 2005 film Water is based. A documentary about Sidhwa's life called "Bapsi: Silences of My Life" was released on the official YouTube channel of "The Citizens Archive of Pakistan" on 28 October 2022 with the title "First Generation -Stories of partition: Bapsi Sidhwa".

== Background ==
Sidhwa was born to Parsi Zoroastrian parents Peshotan and Tehmina Bhandara in Karachi, Bombay Presidency. She is of Parsi Zoroastrian descent.

Roughly three months after her birth, she moved with her family to Lahore, Punjab Province. She was two years old when she contracted polio, requiring severe surgeries as a young child and leaving an impact throughout her life.

Sidhwa grew up having to live through distressing events during the Partition of India, producing experiences that would shape her writing in the future. For example, a young Sidhwa was walking with her gardener a few months before Partition when they came across a gunny sack, which hid a young man's corpse inside. This experience in particular is mirrored in her novel Cracking India, in addition to showing up in Mehta's Earth. Sidhwa uses her experiences living through Partition as a background for the novel and creating the main character, Lenny.

Sidhwa received her BA from Kinnaird College for Women University in Lahore, Pakistan, in 1957. Shortly after graduating, she got married at the age of 19 and moved to Bombay, a change in scenery which she recalls as an initial shock which became easier to handle once she was able to engage with a community of other Zoroastrians. Sidhwa had a daughter and a son, though her marriage ended after five years, and she moved back to Lahore. Her son remained in Mumbai with his father's family, and Sidhwa was unable to see him for many years due to heightened border restrictions.

Sidhwa eventually remarried in Lahore to her husband, Noshir, who is also a Zoroastrian. She had three more children and began her career as an author. One of her children, Mohur Sidhwa, stood in 2012 as a candidate for state representative in Arizona.

She described herself as a "Punjabi-Parsi". Her first language was Gujarati, her second language was Urdu, and her third language was English. She could read and write best in English, but she was more comfortable talking in Gujarati or Urdu and often translated literally from Gujarati or Urdu to English.

Sidhwa died in Houston, Texas on 25 December 2024, at the age of 86.

== Teaching ==
After attending a fellowship at Harvard University, Sidhwa started her first teaching job at Columbia University. Teaching writing to graduate students, Sidhwa initially experienced difficulty in teaching due to lack of experience, frequently experiencing panic attacks before her lectures.

Sidhwa left Columbia after one academic term and started living in Houston, teaching at the University of St. Thomas before eventually teaching at Rice University's School of Continuing Studies. Sidhwa also taught at the University of Houston, Mount Holyoke College, and Brandeis University.

== Awards ==
- Bunting Fellowship at Radcliffe/Harvard (1986)
- Visiting Scholar at the Rockefeller Foundation Center, Bellagio, Italy, (1991)
- Sitara-i-Imtiaz (Star of Excellence) Award, (1991, Pakistan's highest national honor in the arts)
- Lila Wallace-Reader's Digest Writer's Award (1994)
- Mondello Prize (Premio Mondello for Foreign Authors) for Water (2007)
- Inducted in the Zoroastrian Hall of Fame (2000)

== Works ==
The city of Lahore, Pakistan, where she was brought up, is central to her four novels below:

- Their Language of Love : published by Readings Lahore (2013, Pakistan.)
- Jungle Wala Sahib (Translation) (Urdu) : Published by Readings Lahore (2012, Pakistan)
- City of Sin and Splendour : Writings on Lahore (2006, US)
- Water: A Novel (2006, US and Canada)
- Bapsi Sidhwa Omnibus (2001, Pakistan)
- An American Brat (1993, U.S.; 1995, India)
- Cracking India (1991, U.S.; 1992, India; originally published as Ice Candy Man, 1988, England)
- The Bride (1982, England; 1983;1984, India; published as The Pakistani Bride, 1990 US and 2008 US)
- The Crow Eaters (1978, Pakistan; 1979 &1981, India; 1980, England; 1982, US)
