= Earth (1998 film) =

1999 film by Deepa Mehta

1947 Earth
- Theatrical release poster
- Directed by: Deepa Mehta
- Story by: Deepa Mehta
- Based on: Cracking India by Bapsi Sidhwa
- Produced by: Anne Masson; Deepa Mehta
- Starring: Aamir Khan; Rahul Khanna; Nandita Das; Maia Sethna
- Narrated by: Shabana Azmi
- Cinematography: Giles Nuttgens
- Edited by: Barry Farrell
- Music by: A. R. Rahman
- Release dates: September 11, 1998; (Canada); 1999 (India)
- Running time: 101 minutes
- Countries: Canada; India
- Language: Hindi

Earth (released in India as 1947: Earth) is a 1998 Indo-Canadian period romance drama film directed by Deepa Mehta. It is based upon Bapsi Sidhwa's novel, Cracking India (1991, US; 1992, India; originally published as Ice Candy Man, 1988, UK), set during the 1947 partition of India. Earth is the second instalment of Mehta's Elements trilogy, preceded by Fire (1996) and followed by Water (2005). It was India's entry for the 1999 Academy Award for Best Foreign Language Film.

== Plot ==
The story is set in Lahore (now the capital of Pakistani Punjab) in the period directly before and during the partition of India in 1947 at the time of Indian independence.

A young girl with polio, Lenny, narrates the story through the voice of her adult self. She is from a wealthy Parsi family who hope to remain neutral to the rising tensions between Hindus, Sikhs, and Muslims in the area. She is adored and protected by her parents, Bunty and Rustom, and cared for by her Hindu Ayah, named Shanta. Both Dil Navaz (also known as the Ice-Candy Man) and Hassan (the Masseur) are in love with Shanta. Shanta, Dil, and Hassan are part of a small group of friends from different faiths (some of whom work for Lenny's family) who spend their days together in the park. With the violence of partition, however, this once unified group of friends becomes divided and tragedy ensues.

The movie's turning point occurs when Dil waits for his sisters at the train station, only to find massacred refugees inside the arriving "ghost train." This sight radicalizes Dil's character, who grows hateful towards Hindus and Sikhs.

In the midst of this violence, Shanta and Hassan plan to marry, which further incites Dil, who is increasingly troubled by Shanta's relationship with Hassan. By the end of the movie, he turns on the woman he once loved. He tricks Lenny into revealing Shanta's hiding spot when she is targeted by an angry mob. At the end of the movie, an older Lenny narrates on the inner trouble this betrayal caused her.

== Cast ==
- Aamir Khan – Dil Nawaz
- Rahul Khanna – Hassan, the Masseur
- Nandita Das – Shanta, the maid
- Maia Sethna – Lenny Sethna
- Shabana Azmi – older Lenny, narrator
- Kitu Gidwani – Bunty Sethna
- Arif Zakaria – Rustom Sethna
- Kulbhushan Kharbanda – Imam Din
- Kumar Rajendra – Refugee Police
- Pavan Malhotra – Butcher
- Gulshan Grover – Sardar
- Raghubir Yadav – A Hindu friend who is forced to convert to Islam

== Critical reception ==
=== Reviews ===
The film holds an 86% rating on Rotten Tomatoes based on 35 reviews. Roger Ebert gave the film three out of four stars and states that Earth "is effective because it doesn't require much history from its viewers, explains what needs to be known, and has a universal message". The New York Times described it as "a powerful and disturbing reminder of how a civilization can suddenly crack under certain pressures". The New Yorker argues that "Deepa Mehta handles her material convincingly, and the cast is so likable that they wear the larger themes like beautiful garments". Rediff.com notes that "Aamir Khan has probably given the best performance of his life. It is hard to imagine another actor bringing alive the nuances of the ice-candy man the way he does".

=== Awards and nominations ===
- Asian Film Festival – Best Film Award
- Filmfare Best Male Debut Award – Rahul Khanna
- Filmfare Best Female Debut Award – Nandita Das
- Earth was India's official entry for the 71st Academy Award for Best Foreign Language Film in 1999, but was not included among the final five nominees selected by the AMPAS.

== Soundtrack ==
All lyrics are written by Javed Akhtar; all music is composed by A. R. Rahman.

No.	Title	Singer(s)	Length
1.	"Ruth Aa Gayee Re"	Sukhwinder Singh	5:31
2.	"Banno Rani"	Sadhana Sargam	4:09
3.	"Ishwar Allah"	Anuradha Sriram, Sujatha Mohan	5:15
4.	"Dheemi Dheemi"	Hariharan	5:16
5.	"Raat Ki Daldal Hain"	Sukhwinder Singh	4:05
6.	"Yeh Jo Zindagi Hain"	Srinivas, Sujata Trivedi	4:51
7.	"Yeh Jo Zindagi Hain"	Srinivas, Sukhwinder Singh	4:07
8.	"Piano Theme" (Instrumental)		1:53
9.	"Theme Music" (Instrumental)		4:50

== See also ==
- List of Asian historical drama films
