= Alamgir Mosque =

Mosque in Varanasi, Uttar Pradesh, India

Alamgir Mosque (Aurangzeb's Mosque)
- आलमगीर मस्जिद
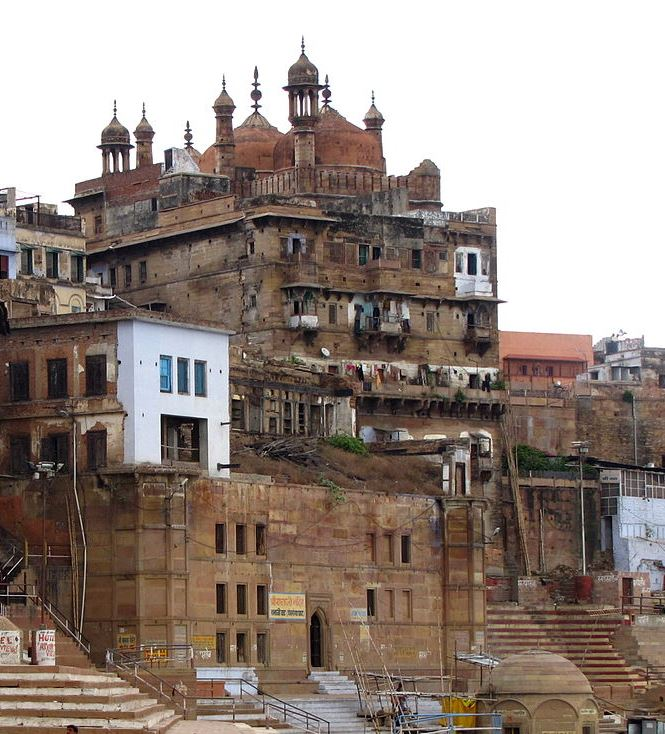
- The mosque in 2009

- Location of the mosque in Uttar Pradesh

Religion
- Affiliation: Islam
- Ecclesiastical or organisational status: Mosque
- Status: Active

Location
- Location: Varanasi, Uttar Pradesh
- Country: India
- Coordinates: 25°18′55″N 83°01′04″E

Architecture
- Type: Mosque architecture
- Style: Indo-Islamic; Hindu
- Founder: Aurangzeb
- Completed: 1670s

Specifications
- Dome: Many
- Minaret: Two (since removed)

The Alamgir Mosque, also known as the Aurangzeb's Mosque (Hindi: आलमगीर मस्जिद), is a mosque in Varanasi, Uttar Pradesh, India. The mosque is located at a prominent site above the Panchaganga Ghat. The ghat has broad steps that go down to the Ganges.

== Overview ==
Aurangzeb conquered Varanasi in 1669 and constructed a mosque named Alamagir Mosque, in the name of his own honorary title "Alamgir", which he had adopted after becoming the emperor of the Mughal empire.

The minarets could not withstand the test of time and in the 19th century, an English scholar James Prinsep had to restore them. In 1948 one of the minarets collapsed killing a few people around the time of the floods. Later the government pulled down the other minaret, for security reasons.

The mosque is architecturally a blend of Indo-Islamic and Hindu architecture. The mosque has high domes and minarets. Two of its minarets were damaged; one minaret collapsed killing a few people and the other was officially brought down owing to stability concerns. The Panchaganga Ghat where the mosque is situated is where five streams are said to join. In October lamps are lighted on top of a bamboo staff as a mark of guidance to the ancestors.

== Gallery ==
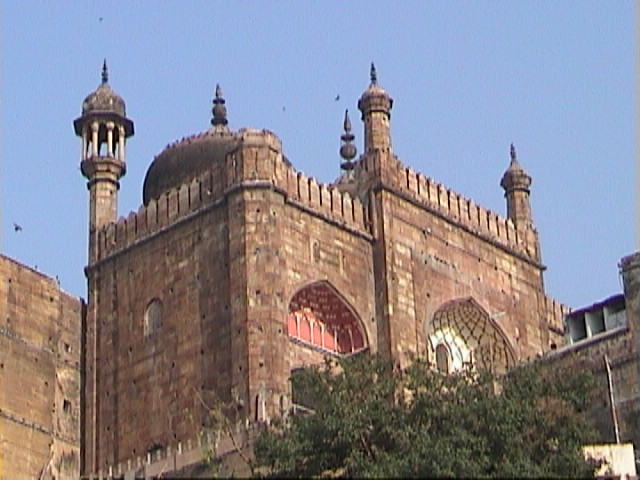
Exterior view

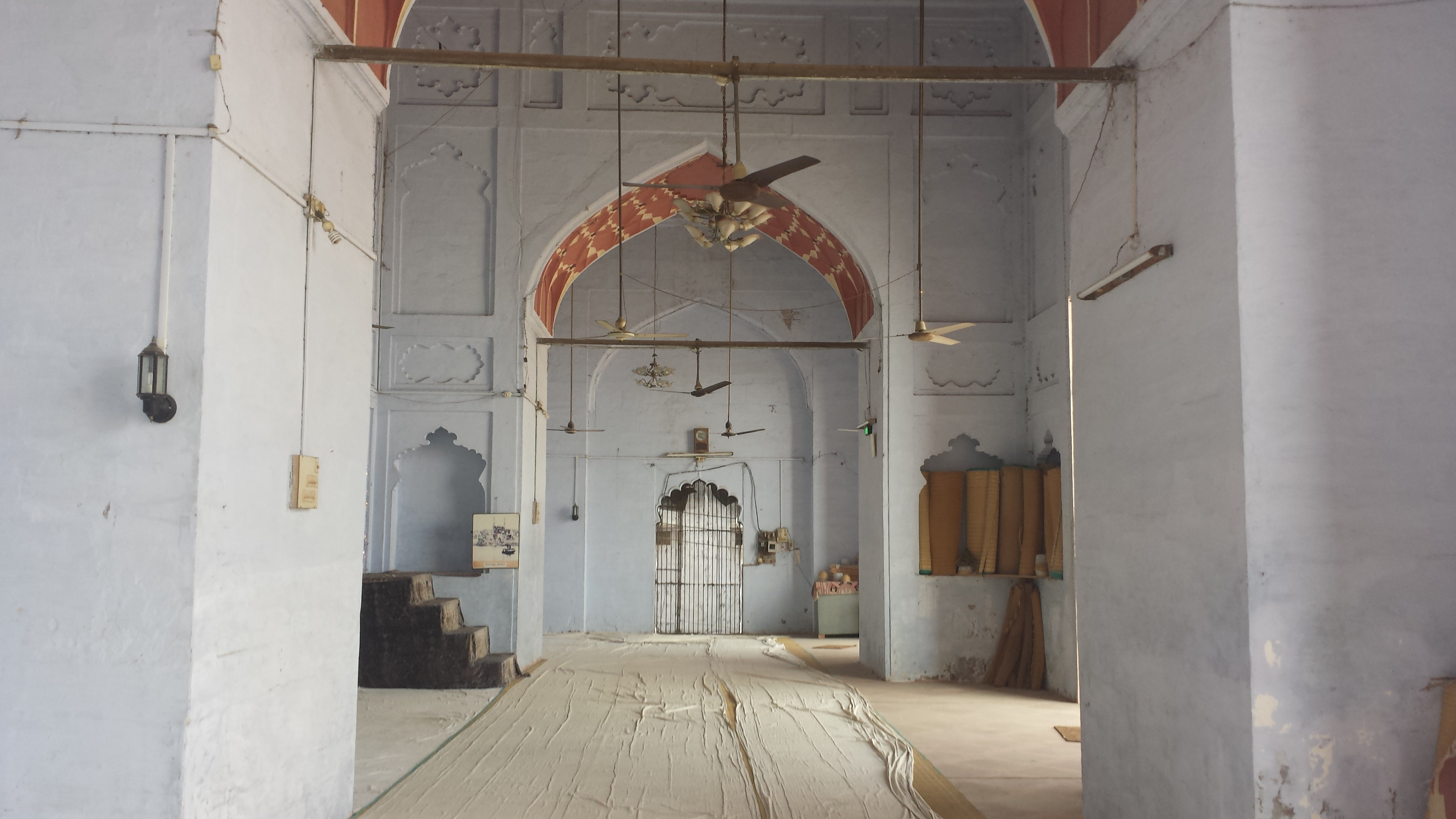
Interior view

== See also ==
- Islam in India
- List of mosques in India
