= Murree Brewery =

Pakistani multinational beverage manufacturer

- Murree Brewery's logo
- Location: National Park Road, Rawalpindi, Punjab, Pakistan
- Opened: 1860; 166 years ago
- Key people: Ch. Mueen Afzal (Chairman); Isphanyar M. Bhandara (CEO)
- Revenue: ▲ Rs. 18.59 billion (US$66 million) (2023)
- Operating income: ▼ Rs. 2.12 billion (US$7.6 million) (2023)
- Net income: ▼ Rs. 1.27 billion (US$4.5 million) (2023)
- Total assets: ▲ Rs. 16.65 billion (US$60 million) (2023)
- Divisions: Liquor division Tops division Glass division
- Website: www.murreebrewery.com

Active beers
Name	Type
Murree beers
Murree Beer	Beer
Murree's Classic Lager	Lager
Murree's Millennium	Beer
Lite Export Pils	Pilsner
Murree's Strong Brew	Beer
Murree's Special Strong Brew	Beer
Strauss Beer	Beer
Murree's Stout Beer	Stout
Murree's Wheat Beer	Witbier
Liquors beers
Rarest Malt Whisky	Whisky
Malt Whisky Classic	Whisky
Vintage Whisky	Whisky
Bolskaya	Vodka
Murree's Vodka	Vodka
Gin beers
Silver Top Gin	Gin
London Dry Gin	Dry Gin
Citrus Gin	Gin
Lemo' Lime Gin	Gin
Non Alcoholic beers
Cindy	NAB
Malt-79	Stout

Murree Brewery is a Pakistani multinational manufacturer of alcoholic and non-alcoholic beverages. It is Pakistan's largest and oldest producer of alcoholic products. In 2015, it produced 10 million litres of beer, along with hundreds of tons of single malt whisky, vodka and brandy. Founded by the British in 1860, it is a publicly traded company listed on the Pakistan Stock Exchange, and its products are exported to Bangladesh. In 2014, the company established a US flagship store on Park Avenue, in Manhattan, New York City. In 2013, it was named by Forbes as one of Asia's 200 best companies.

The brewery has two manufacturing units, one located in Rawalpindi, Punjab, and the other in Hattar, Khyber Pakhtunkhwa. It has three divisions: Liquor (which deals with alcoholic and non-alcoholic drinks), Tops (which focuses on food items, mineral water, and fruit juices), and Glass (which makes glass jars and bottles) divisions. It is one of Pakistan's fastest-growing companies.

== History ==
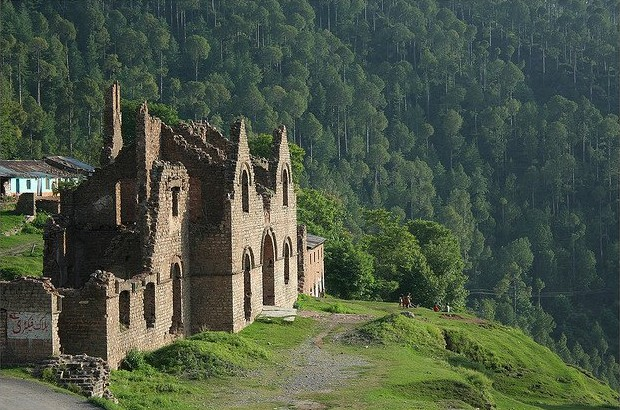
Ruins of one of the earliest buildings used by Murree Brewery

The Murree Brewery Company Ltd. was established in 1860 to meet the demands of British military and civilian personnel at Ghora Gali near the resort town of Murree. The brewery was managed by the family of Edward Dyer. In the 1880s the company established a further brewery in Rawalpindi and a distillery in Quetta.

Due to scarcity of water in Murree in the 1920s, brewing was mostly transferred to Rawalpindi, but malting continued at Ghora Gali until the 1940s, when this property was sold. This brewery, built in the Gothic revival style of architecture, was burnt during the independence of Pakistan in 1947, while the brewery in Quetta was destroyed in the 1935 Quetta earthquake. In the 1940s, the controlling share or interest in the brewery was obtained by a Parsi, Peshton Bandhara, who used to run a liquor business in Lahore before Pakistani independence. His son, the late M.P. Bandhara later carried on the business and now it is being run by a grandson, Isphanyar M. Bandhara.

In the 1960s the brewery imported oak casks from North America, Australia and Spain, and the underground cellars now hold over half a million litres of malt whisky for varying periods of maturation up to 12 years. Murree brewery produces a single malt whisky.

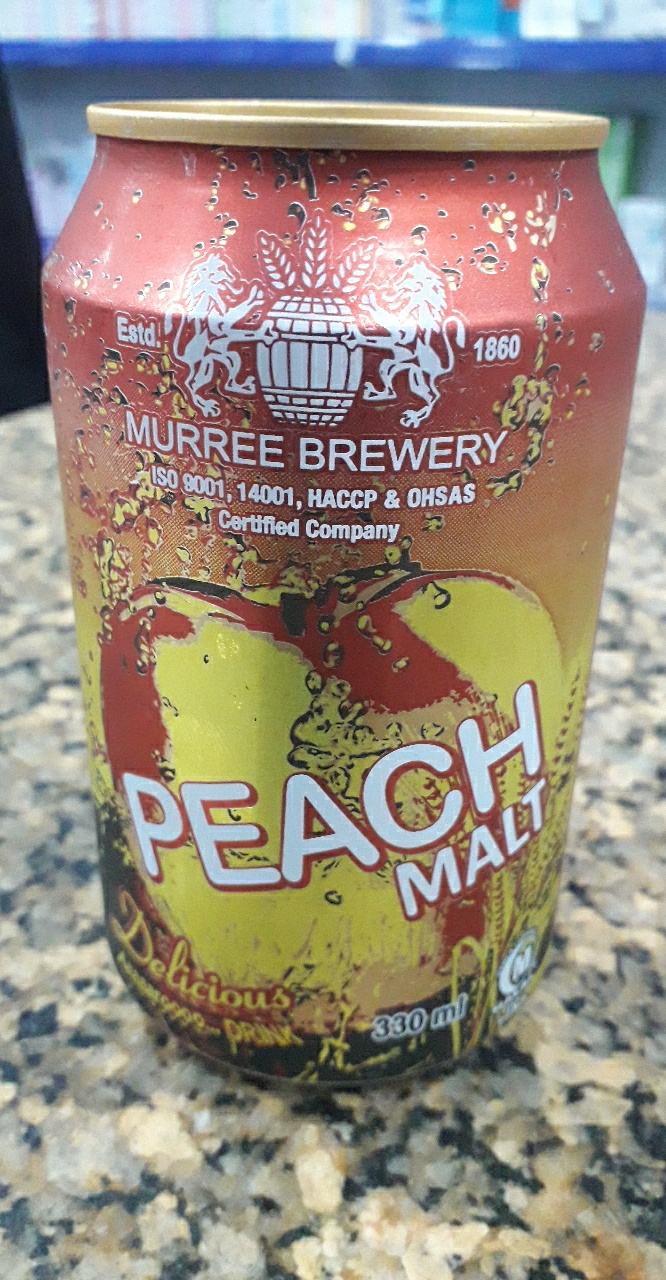
A can of Peach Malt, one of Murree Brewery's non-alcoholic products.

A new beer canning and modern bottle filling facility were installed in the 1990s, imported from Germany. In 2001, the brewery had been temporarily closed for producing too much polluting waste. Authorities slapped the environmental protection order on the Murree Brewery in Rawalpindi, Islamabad's twin city.

=== "Rarest Malt Whisky" ===
In 2007, Murree became the Muslim world's first distillery to make 20-year-old malt whisky named "Rarest Malt Whisky". But, according to law, it cannot be exported and cannot be consumed by 97% of the population of Pakistan as local law prohibits Muslims from drinking alcohol. However, the CEO of Murree Brewery claimed that "99 per cent of his customers are Muslims in Pakistan".

== Recent growth ==
In 1977, the Murree Brewery suffered a significant setback when Prime Minister Zulfikar Ali Bhutto imposed a total alcohol prohibition in Pakistan. Subsequently, the government of President General Zia-ul-Haq amended this law, requiring anyone wishing to consume alcohol to present credentials demonstrating that they were non-Muslim. The small Christian, Hindu and Parsi communities were not large enough to support the enterprise, and production had to be scaled back.

However, gradual relaxation of the prohibition laws has allowed Murree to introduce variations of Murree beer, vodka, gin, and whisky. Today, all Murree products are readily available in legal liquor shops that operate openly in Karachi in places like Zamzama and Defence. It is also available in Sindh and Balochistan.

Murree Beer was initially being produced in Austria for European markets and was available in various Pakistani and Indian restaurants, an enterprise which has since ceased since 2004. The current CEO, Isphanyar Bhandara has announced plans to pursue co-brewing with Foster's, but this scheme is still in development.

The Murree Brewery is one of the oldest public companies of South Asia. Its shares were traded on the Calcutta Stock Exchange as early as 1902, and it is now the oldest continuing industrial enterprise of Pakistan and among the top 25 performing public companies on the Karachi Stock Exchange.

Murree's biggest competitor is the Quetta Distillery, and its products have to increasingly vie with smuggled brands from the West and India.

On 6 June 2012, Scout Willis, the daughter of Hollywood actors Bruce Willis and Demi Moore, was arrested in New York City and jailed overnight for drinking a beer, manufactured by Murree Brewery. This incident resulted in free publicity for the company via word-of-mouth marketing, leading in to line up various distributors in the USA and Dubai as part of its expansion plans.

In 2013, Murree Brewery opened a franchise in India to a Bangalore-based entrepreneur, allowing the brewing, bottling and marketing of the beer in India.

In September 2025, Murree Brewery was allowed to export beer for the first time since the 1970s. At first, we weren't sure that everything would go smoothly," explains the company's export manager, Ramiz Shah. In order to test the export procedure, the brewery shipped its first consignment of beer to the UK and then Portugal and Japan, with the goal of increasing its global sales to additional markets, such as the US and Canada. Murree recorded its best year on record in 2025, surpassing $100 million in annual revenue, the first in its history.

== Shareholder dispute ==
On 19 October 2016, the Lahore High Court heard the case between Kingsway Capital LLP and Murree Brewery Co. Ltd., where Kingsway Capital LLP petitioned the Murree Brewery Co. Ltd. EOGM of 29 September 2016 to be declared as invalid and unlawful. The petition was thereafter allowed. On 7 September 2016, Kingsway Fund replied to the Pakistan Stock Exchange regarding allegations in the "Murree Letter" published by the Pakistan Stock Exchange on 3 September 2016.

== See also ==
- Murree beer
