= Cracking India =

Novel by Bapsi Sidhwa

- First edition
- Author: Bapsi Sidhwa
- Language: English
- Genre: Novel
- Publisher: Milkweed Editions
- Publication date: 1991
- Publication place: United States
- Media type: Print (hardback & paperback)
- Pages: 289 pp (first edition, hardback)
- ISBN: 0-915943-51-4 (first edition, hardback)
- OCLC: 23462280
- Dewey Decimal: 823 20
- LC Class: PR9540.9.S53 I34 1991

Cracking India (1991, U.S., 1992, India; originally published as Ice Candy Man, 1988, England) is a novel by author Bapsi Sidhwa.

== Summary ==
Setting: Lahore

Time: 1943 - 1948

This novel is generally referred to as a story about the Partition of India – hence the title – but its original title was "Ice-Candy-Man," which allows for a broader interpretation of the story. The plot involves Lenny, a 4-year-old Parsee girl who recounts her childhood memories after she is struck by polio in her infancy. She spends most of her time with her ayah Shanta, an 18-year-old Hindu girl from Amritsar. Their relationship is the main narrative because Lenny spends a lot of time with her ayah and she learns a lot about adult relationships from being with the voluptuous nanny and her very diverse group of admirers.

Sexual awakening is a major theme of the book but so is communal identity as the story takes place between 1943 and 1948 when India gained independence but was split into two countries. Ayah's admirers are a cross section of the Lahore residents before Partition. Lenny has a lot of female relatives and this novel has a plethora of characters, but ayah is the one she is most intimate with. Partition does not really affect Lenny until, during the chaos of 1947, she accidentally betrays ayah's presence in the house and ayah is carried off by an angry Muslim mob.

The tone of the novel, written almost completely in the present tense, is rather caustic and remote much like the relationship between the children and their parents. This distance is enforced by the fact that in a couple of passages the writer reveals that she conjured up this little girl and her memories 40 years after they happened. The consistent use of the present tense makes the memories extra vivid but the insights, the language and the humor are not always those of a little girl.

Only the stories the adults tell Lenny and a special section called "Ranna's story" are written in the past tense. Ranna’s story is the grueling report on how the great grandson of Imam Din, the family cook, - whom Lenny met on a visit to his village - witnessed the murder of his entire village and barely escaped alive. The telling of it is the more striking because of the change of voice as the extreme violence would be hard to convey through the eyes of an 8-year-old girl who was not there.

Once Partition and Pakistan become the new reality, the children worry about what may have become of Ayah. Lenny's mother and aunt are involved in taking care of fallen women, victims of the violence now rejected by their families. Then they see Ayah in a car, dressed up and made up like a Bollywood star. They find out that she is living in the Kotha, the disreputable part of the old city with Ice-Candy-man, one of her former admirers who has now transformed himself into an Urdu poet but pimps her out and represses Ayah ruthlessly. Lenny's godmother intervenes and they extricate Ayah from her captivity in order to let her return to her family village.

The book is made up of many lively and interesting anecdotes, some of them related to Partition, but just as many to Lenny's personal development and the unique position of the Parsis in Lahore and in India. Some of the chapters carry forward the plot but many of them do not but they leave an indelible impression of a community in a place that was permanently transformed in a matter of months.

== Autobiographical elements ==
There are some parallels between the novel and Sidhwa's own life. Similar to the main character Lenny, Sidhwa is Parsi, contracted polio as a child, grew up in Lahore, and was nine years old during the Partition of India. Although she did not witness mob violence first hand, she heard mob chanting in the distance and saw a few corpses during the conflict. Additionally, the scene in which ayah's lover is found in the road reflects one of Sidhwa's real memories from the time:

I was actually walking to my private tutor, and there was this gunnysack lying by the roadside. The gardener, who was with me, just kicked the gunnysack, and a body spilled out, a dead body of a very good looking man.

When the movie adaptation of the novel, Earth, was being filmed, the crew consulted Sidhwa's memory of the incident to recreate this scene.

== Characters ==
The Family:

- Lenny's parents, the Sethis
- Adi, her younger brother
- Electric Aunt (she does everything at the speed of lightning)
- Cousin, her son and close friend to Lenny
- Godmother (Roda) & (her) Oldhusband
- Slavesister or Mini Aunty, sister of Godmother whom she treats like a servant
- Dr Manek Mody, brother in law of Godmother who lives in Rawalpindi

The Servants:

- Imam Din, the family cook
- Ranna, his great grandson from the village
- Hari, the gardener who becomes Muslim and changes his name to Hiram Ali
- The sweeper family, Moti, Muccho and their much abused daughter Papoo
- Hamida, the new Ayah recruited from the house for fallen women

The Neighbors and other locals:

- Ice-Candy-Man, ayah's admirer who keeps her in captivity after she leaves the family
- The Shankars, the newlyweds
- Rosy & Pete and their Sikh father & American mother
- Inspector General Rogers and his wife
- Colonel Bharucha, surgeon and leader of the Parsee community
- Mr & Mrs Pen, Anglo-Indian couple who tutor Lenny's schoolwork
- Ayah's admirers: Masseur; Chinaman; Government House Gardener; Ramazan the Butcher; Sher Singh, the Zookeeper; Wrestler who owns the restaurant; Sharbat Singh the Pathan, the knife-sharpener

== Film ==
Deepa Mehta's 1998 film, Earth (titled Earth 1947), is based on Cracking India.

== Controversies ==
A complaint was filed in Volusia County, Florida, arguing that Cracking India, which was on a high school reading list, contained "pornographic material" and should be banned from the county's public schools. The district decided not to ban the book.

== Critical reception ==
In November 2019, the BBC News listed Ice Candy Man on its list of the 100 most influential novels.
