= Manushi =

Indian feminist magazine

Manushi: A Journal about Women and Society is an Indian magazine devoted to feminism as well as to gender studies and activism. The magazine was founded in 1978 by Madhu Kishwar and Ruth Vanita, two scholars based in New Delhi. Kishwar and Vanita co-edited the journal from 1978 to 1991. It is currently published as a bi-monthly; a total of 157 issues have appeared by the end of the year 2006. Manushi is also a publishing house which prints not just works on the status of women in India but also novels and short stories with a less direct connection to gender issues.

Manushi from the beginning has sought to publish articles about the full range of South Asian communities. It regularly includes articles about women's issues in Pakistan, Nepal, Bangladesh and Sri Lanka as well as less frequent articles from around the world. The editors strive to cover people often relatively ignored in English-language media in South Asia. Activists are asked to contribute articles about peasants, workers and minorities, whether religious or ethnic. Manushi sponsors series of lectures and training seminars and also furnishes information to victimised women.
