= Devyani Saltzman =

Canadian writer and journalist

- Occupations: Writer; Curator
- Parents: Paul Saltzman (father); Deepa Mehta (mother)
- Website: devyanisaltzman.org

Devyani Saltzman is a Canadian-born writer, curator, and international arts leader. She is known for her work in arts and culture, and has held senior positions in three of Canada's major cultural institutions, including as the Director of Public Programming at the Art Gallery of Ontario, the fourth largest museum in North America.

In 2024 she was appointed as the Barbican's new Director for Arts, working with the centre's heads of art forms to set the direction of overall programming across cinema, theatre, visual arts, music, immersive experiences and creative collaborations.

== Early life and education ==
Devyani Saltzman was born in 1979, the granddaughter of Canadian weatherman Percy Saltzman and the daughter of film directors Paul Saltzman and Deepa Mehta. Paul Saltzman, her father, is Jewish; her mother Indian. They separated when she was 11 years old.

Saltzman received her degree in Human Sciences from Hertford College at Oxford University in 2003. She specialized in sociology and anthropology.

== Writing career ==
Devyani Saltzman is the author of Shooting Water: A Memoir of Second Chances, Family, and Filmmaking, as well as articles for The Globe and Mail, The National Post, The Literary Review of Canada, the Atlantic, Tehelka, Marie Claire, Room literary journal and The Walrus Magazine. Her debut book Shooting Water: A Memoir of Second Chances, Family, and Filmmaking details the making of her mother, Deepa Mehta's, third film in her “Elements” trilogy, entitled Water. It was published in Canada (2005), the US and India and received "starred reviews" in both Publishers Weekly and the Library Journal and was called 'A poignant memoir' by The New York Times. Her freelance writing subjects include interviews with Pico Iyer, Sarah Polley, Floria Sigismondi and articles on India, long-term care facilities and immigrant domestic workers.

== Current projects ==
Saltzman is a founding Curator at Luminato, Toronto's International Arts Festival and has been involved in a number of arts initiatives including Project Bookmark Canada, The Toronto Museum Project as well as being a juror for the National Magazine Awards, Canada Council for the Arts, Ontario Arts Council and The Hilary Weston Writers' Trust Prize for Nonfiction. In 2014 she was appointed Director of Literary Arts at Banff Centre for Arts and Creativity, Canada's national arts hub, where she oversaw year-round programming and public events.

In 2018 she was appointed Director of Public Programming for the Art Gallery of Ontario.

In 2024 she was appointed as the Barbican's new Artistic lead, working with her heads of art forms to set the direction of overall programming across cinema, theatre, visual arts, music, immersive experiences and creative collaborations.

She works with arts organizations in Canada and internationally as an independent curator and consultant on cultural projects. She most recently was a Co-Curator of PEN World Voices Festival, a senior consultant with the Confederation Centre for the Arts, advising on the creation of a national forum on the future of Canada as part of the centre's 65 million dollar project to create a cultural hub in Atlantic Canada, and as Curator of the 2023 Indian Summer Festival, Vancouver's Multidisciplinary Arts Festival.

In February 2026, Devyani Saltzman announced that she would step down from her position as Director of Arts and Participation at the Barbican Centre. The announcement was described as unexpected by some observers, given her role in the Barbican’s artistic programming and organisational strategy. Her departure prompted an open letter signed by numerous public figures emphasising the importance of maintaining diversity in leadership within the arts sector. Her exit, formally confirmed in May 2026, followed a period of organisational change at the institution, including senior leadership restructuring, during which her position was reported to have been made redundant.

== Awards and governance ==
Writers’ Trust of Canada	Vice Chair
Toronto Arts Council	President
SummerWorks Performance Festival	Board Member
Ontario Association of Art Galleries	Board Member
