= Hamilton-Mehta Productions =

Independent film production company

Hamilton-Mehta Productions is a Toronto-based independent film production company. Founded in 1996 by director Deepa Mehta and producer David Hamilton, Hamilton-Mehta Productions is well known for its films that explore the human condition. The recipient of many well respected awards, Hamilton-Mehta's film Water was nominated in 2007 for an Academy Award for Best Foreign Language Film.

== Filmography ==
- Fire (1996)
- Earth (1998)
- Water (2005)
- Heaven on Earth (2008)
- The Forgotten Woman (2008)
- Cooking with Stella (2009)
- Midnight's Children (2012) - based on the novel Midnight's Children by Salman Rushdie
- Beeba Boys (2015)
- Anatomy of Violence (2016)
