= Funny Boy (soundtrack) =

2020 EP / film score by Howard Shore

Funny Boy (Original Motion Picture Soundtrack)

EP / film score by Howard Shore
- Released: December 10, 2020
- Studio: Abbey Road Studios, London; YRF Studios, Mumbai
- Genre: Film score
- Length: 21:53
- Label: Howe Records
- Producer: Howard Shore

Howard Shore chronology
Le prince oublié (2020)	Funny Boy (2020)	Pieces of a Woman (2021)

Funny Boy (Original Motion Picture Soundtrack) is the film score composed by Howard Shore to the 2020 film Funny Boy directed by Deepa Mehta. The album was released through Howe Records on December 10, 2020, and received positive reviews for which Shore won the Canadian Screen Award for Best Original Score.

== Development ==
Howard Shore composed the film score for Funny Boy in his maiden collaboration with Deepa Mehta. Considering the film as a deeply personal experience for Mehta as well as for him as Canada being his home country, Shore liked the sensibilities and roots of how Canada welcomes its immigrants. He noted on sharing a great collaboration with Mehta, owing to her "great sense of music" and shared and a connection right from the beginning. From a musical perspective, the duo focused towards Arjie, and built the whole score around his theme while the conflicts then came a little later. Shore noted that the spotting of music was much important and that was so elegant throughout the film, owing to Mehta's musical sensibilities.

Shore prominently emphasized on the use of Indian traditional instruments such as hamonium, santoor and bansuri, so that provided a nostalgic tone. This also possesses a cultural specification and universal tonality conveying the turbulent nature of Sri Lanka as well as noting that Arjie's destiny is one shared by millions of young people. He cited Bicycle Thieves (1948) and Cinema Paradiso (1988) as influences for Funny Boy.

Shore recorded the score at the middle of the COVID-19 pandemic lockdown. He conducted private recordings in Mumbai, London, New York City and at a small village in Switzerland. The album featured performances from soloists such as harmonium player Ashutosh Sohoni, santoor player Greg Knowles, bansuri player Sandro Frederich and violist Ljova Zhurbin. It was mixed by Sam Okell and mastered by Simon Gobson, at the Abbey Road Studios in London. Compared to the orchestral recording over soloistic recording, Shore denoted that the principal was same by sketching music with a pencil for 4–6 lines even though he did not accompany an orchestra. As the musicians would directly work off with his pencil sketches, he denoted it as a direct way to communicate.

The score and sounds were generally interwoven with the dialogues that invoke melancholic nostalgia or unease. He referenced an example of Martin Scorsese's Hugo (2011), where the sound designers matched the whistle of the trains to the key of the score, denoting how music and sound design correlate.

== Release ==
The score was released through Howe Records on December 10, 2020, six days after the film's release.

== Reception ==
Deborah Young of The Hollywood Reporter wrote "Composer Howard Shore (The Lord of the Rings) uses a light touch to capture the atmosphere of a romantic lost time, with just a hint of epic detectable in the background." Guy Lodge of Variety wrote "a strident, culture-clashing score by Howard Shore add additional polish." Naman Ramachandran of British Film Institute called it a "sweeping score". Jonathan Romney of Screen International described the music as "fascinating". Film Threat called it a "rousing musical score".

== Track listing ==
No.	Title	Length
1.	"Arjie"	1:53
2.	"Radha Aunty"	3:04
3.	"Anuradhapura Station"	2:47
4.	"Jegan"	3:55
5.	"Red Sari"	1:38
6.	"Riot Journal"	4:19
7.	"Leaving Sri Lanka"	4:15
Total length:		21:53

== Awards and nominations ==
Award	Date of ceremony	Category	Nominees	Result	Ref.
Canadian Screen Awards	May 20, 2021	Best Original Score	Howard Shore	Won	
