= Balinder Johal =

Indo-Canadian actress

- Born: Punjab, India
- Occupation: Actress
- Years active: 1992–present

Balinder Johal is an Indo-Canadian actress. She is best known for her roles in the films of Deepa Mehta, including Heaven on Earth, for which she was a Leo Award nominee for Best Supporting Actress in 2009, and Beeba Boys, for which she garnered a Canadian Screen Award nomination as Best Supporting Actress at the 4th Canadian Screen Awards in 2016.

Originally from Punjab, Johal was educated in India before moving to Canada to pursue a master's degree in education at the University of British Columbia.

As a stage actress, her most noted performances included Here and Now, a forum theatre play about urban gang violence in Vancouver, and Anosh Irani's play My Granny the Goldfish. She has also performed in guest appearances in the television series The Chris Isaak Show, Da Vinci's Inquest, 49th & Main, Aliens in America, Psych, Smallville and Sanctuary, and minor roles in the films Freddy Got Fingered, Josie and the Pussycats, No Men Beyond This Point and Donkeyhead.

== Filmography ==
Year	Title	Role	Notes
1992	Northwood		TV Series
1995	Wings of Courage		
1995	Gunfighter's Moon	Elana	
2000	Becoming Dick		TV Series
2001	Josie and the Pussycats		
2001	Freddy Got Fingered		
2001	The Chris Isaak Show		TV Series 1 Episode
2004	Pink Ludoos		
2004	Da Vinci's Inquest		TV Series 1 Episode
2005	The Collector	Ina	TV Series 1 Episode
2005	Murder Unveiled		
2006	49th & Main	Mrs Grewal	TV Series 4 Episodes
2006	Abridge		
2007	American Venus		
2008	Aliens in America	Huma	TV Series 1 Episode
2008	Psych	Hadewych	TV Series 1 Episode
2008	Heaven on Earth	Maji Dhillon	
2008	Passengers		
2008	Of Gold and God		
2008	Sweet Amerika		
2009	Smallville		TV Series 1 Episode
2010	Sanctuary	Bibi	TV Series 3 Episodes
2012	Jatt & Juliet	Kathy	
2014	Jatt & Juliet 2	Pooja's grandmother	
2013	Best of Luck		
2014	Once Upon a Time in Wonderland	Healer	TV Series 1 Episode
2015	No Men Beyond This Point		
2016	Beeba Boys	Mrs Johar	
2016	Book of Love		
2016	Killer Punjabi		
2016	Travelers		TV Series
2017	Jindua		
2017	Prison Break		TV Series
2017	Crash Pad	Muumuu	
2017	Ghost Wars		TV Series
2019	The 410	Nani	TV Series
2019	Fusion Generation	Pritam Dhaliwal	
2019	Supergirl	Old lady	TV Series 1 Episode
2019	Two Sentence Horror Stories		TV Series
2021	Honsla Rakh	Jamin's grandmother	
2021	Love Hard		
2021	Yellowjackets	Mrs Singh	TV Series 1 Episode
2022	Donkeyhead		
2022	Babe Bhangra Paunde Ne		
2022	Arranged Marriage		
2024	A Nice Indian Boy	Ancient Grandmother	
