= Swimming in the Monsoon Sea =

Coming-of-age novel by Shyam Selvadurai

- Author: Shyam Selvadurai
- Publisher: Tundra Books
- Publication date: September 13, 2005
- Pages: 224
- ISBN: 0-88776-735-4

Swimming in the Monsoon Sea is a coming-of-age novel written by Shyam Selvadurai set in Sri Lanka in 1980, during the monsoon season. Fourteen-year-old Amrith lives a contented life with his lively Auntie Bundle and gentle Uncle Lucky, avoiding thoughts of his past when his loving mother was still alive. He hopes to spend his vacation performing in his school's production of Othello and is learning to type at Uncle Lucky's tropical fish business. However, his routine is abruptly disrupted when his cousin arrives from Canada, bringing an unexpected whirlwind into his life. Amrith finds himself falling in love with the Canadian boy, paralleling the intense themes of jealousy in Othello, which serve as a backdrop to Amrith's own emotional upheaval.

== Background ==
Shyam Selvadurai was born in 1965 and grew up in Sri Lanka, eventually immigrating to Canada to escape political tension. Selvadurai identifies as a queer man and emphasizes that he makes an effort to incorporate both his own queerness and immigrant perspective into his writing.

== Reception ==
=== Reviews ===
Kirkus Reviews referred to Swimming in the Monsoon Sea as "a tasteful, wonderful exploration of a seldom-explored culture" and highlighted how "Selvadurai writes with great success to his youngest audience yet". They explained, "His evocation of place and the depth he brings to his characters and their relationships make this a surprisingly gripping read".

Writing for Quill & Quire, Sarah Ellis described Swimming in the Monsoon Sea as "a crossover book" between young adult and adult fiction, "partly because it has two potential audiences, but more so because it will teach teen readers how to read adult fiction." She further compared Swimming in the Monsoon Sea to Selvadurai's 1994 novel Funny Boy. Ellis indicated that the "hefty overlap of material" between the novels "makes for a revealing case study on what makes a young adult novel", pointing to differences in how Selvadurai opted to handle political issues in the books, as well as the narrative structure. Ellis noted that while "Funny Boy uses a series of linked short stories, Monsoon Sea is a more conventional linear narrative, dealing with a shorter, more focused period of time"; she stated that "Selvadurai artfully retains some of the short story feeling, however, by having chapter titles, a useful device for those readers who still need a helping hand through longer fiction". One of the largest differences she found between the books was the handling of sexuality: "Funny Boy simply has a broader adult perspective and includes humour as part of the equation. [...] Amrith’s story is, in contrast, intense, complicated, sexy, and moving, but not funny. To be a gay teenager in Asia in the early 1980s is, we assume, no joke."

=== Awards and honors ===
Swimming in the Monsoon Sea was selected for the American Library Association's 2007 list of the Best Books for Young Adults and their 2008 Rainbow Book List.

Awards for Swimming in the Monsoon Sea
Year	Award	Result	Ref.
2005	Lambda Literary Award for Children's and Young Adult Literature	Won	
2005	Governor General's Award for English-language children's literature	Finalist	
2005	INDIE Award for Young Adult Fiction (Children's)	silver	
2006	Canadian Library Association Young Adult Book Award	Won	
2006	Ruth and Sylvia Schwartz Children's Book Award	Shortlisted	
