= Hari & Sukhmani =

Indian folktronic duo

- Origin: Chandigarh, India
- Genres: Punjabi folk, Electronic, Sufi music
- Years active: 2009–present
- Members: Hari Singh Jaaj; Sukhmani Malik
- Website: harisukhmani.com

Hari & Sukhmani (also styled as Hari + Sukhmani or Hari and Sukhmani) is an Indian folktronic duo comprising Hari Singh Jaaj and Sukhmani Malik, who are known for fusing traditional folk music of Punjab with electronic music, and incorporating elements from Sufi poetry of Bulle Shah, Baba Farid, Kabir, and Shah Hussain, in their compositions.

== Background ==
=== Hari Singh ===
Hari Singh Jaaj was born in Chandigarh and attended The Doon School in Dehradun. He graduated with a degree in mathematics from St. Xavier's College, Mumbai. He then studied audio engineering in Chennai, and later specialised in electronic music production in Manchester, UK. He performs as a backing vocalist and is the producer and audio engineer.

=== Sukhmani Malik ===
Sukhmani Malik was born in New Delhi and grew up in Chandigarh, listening to folk songs and Sufi music. She got a bachelor's degree in psychology and music and then pursued a master's in Hindustani classical vocal music in Chandigarh. Between 2003 and 2007, she trained with a classical vocalist in Rampur gharana.

=== Band ===
Singh and Malik met in November 2008, and discovered a shared interest in folk music. They formed a band in 2009, producing 10 songs and getting their first gig in "a couple of weeks". Both Singh and Malik sing, while the former also works as a producer and operates the console during live performances. Their songs fuse Punjabi folk music and electronic music, and draw from the poetry of Sufi saints such as Bulle Shah, Baba Farid, Kabir, and Shah Hussain. The compositions have been noted for making the Sufi poets' work accessible to today's audiences. In a 2013 interview in The Hindu, Malik explained their choice of genre, "The idea was to do old folk songs, because the new generation doesn’t hear them. And Hari wanted to go into a chill-out zone with it."

The duo perform in Punjabi, Hindi or English. Their style is minimal in contrast to the usual modern renditions, and Singh explained in an interview: "Bhangra is a very new thing. Traditional folk has never been hardcore; it is very easy going, you never hear big dhols. The idea was to keep that vibe." Hari and Sukhmani produced the folk song Kangi Bawan for director Deepa Mehta's 2008 film Heaven on Earth. In 2016, they collaborated with the Pakistani rock band Noori for the song Yaariyan. In 2019, they collaborated with the Australian band The Coconut Kids on the song Baagey, a bilingual reinterpretation of Baage Vich Aaya Karo, a traditional Punjabi love song.

=== Collaboration with folk artists ===
The duo have collaborated with folk musicians from India and abroad, including morchang player Chugge Khan, Indian percussionist and composer Trilok Gurtu, Vietnamese classical guitarist Thu Le, Iranian percussionist Fakhroddin Ghaffari, singer Suman Sridhar, and Arshad Khan, who plays esraj, a stringed instrument from the Bengal region.

== Discography ==
Singles

- Madhaniya (Punjabi folk song)
- Challa (Punjabi folk song)
- Boohey Bariyan (Punjabi folk song)
- Maati (produced with Trilok Gurtu)
- Paranda
- Yariyaan (2016) - with Pakistani rock band Noori
- Promises (2017)
- Latthay Di Chaadar (2018)
- Baagay (2019) - feat. The Coconut Kids

Guest appearances

- Music in the Hills (2012)
- Season 2, MTV Coke Studio (2012)
- Season 2, The Dewarists (2012)
- NH7 Weekender (2013)
- Miss Diva 2020

Other work

- Folk song Kangi Bawan in Deepa Mehta's film Heaven on Earth (2008)
