= Music in the Hills =

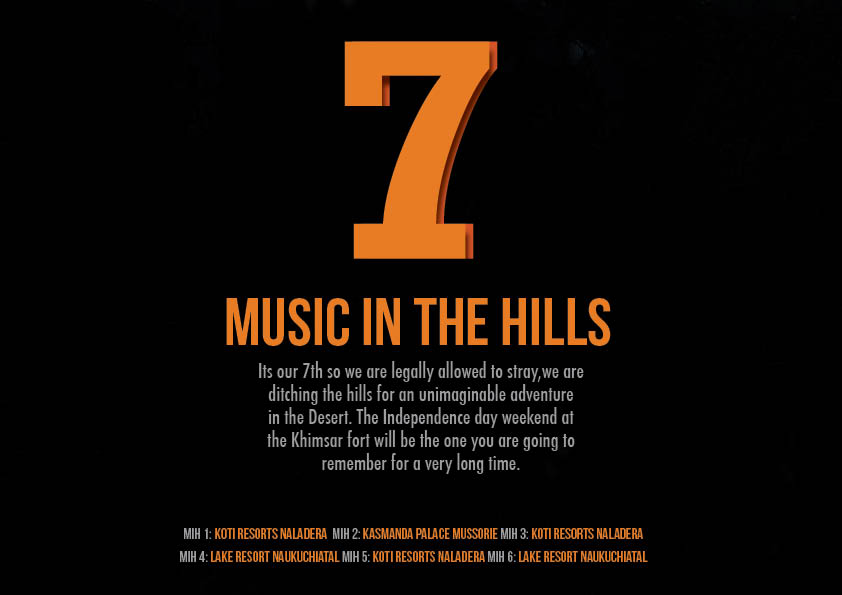
Music In the Hills History

Music in the Hills is an annual Music festival in India organised at various exotic locations. Established in 2007, Music in the Hills tries to bring together good music, good listeners and great locations. Completely informal the festival is wholly sponsored and supported by people who come and attend the event without any sponsorship from Corporates. It is India's biggest independent music festival.

== Overview ==
The musicians are a mix of big stars to talented youngsters. Some of the artists who have performed include the Warsi Brothers of the Rampur Gharana, Raghu Dixit Project, Parikrama, and Soulmate, among others. The music is a mix of various genres like Qawwali, Classic rock, Blues, Indian Folk, Fusion and Pop.

The event is a non-publicised event and mostly attended by hardcore music lovers from around the country and overseas. Insignificantly smaller in scale than the big music festivals in the west, Music in the Hills focuses more on the interaction between the artists and the audience. The musicians stay with the audience and there is a huge interaction with the audience before and after the gig.

Organised mostly at locales around the Hills of Northern India, it was moved to the sand dunes of Rajasthan for the experience of musicians performing on a backdrop of an Old Rajasthani fort and the vast expanse of dunes. The location is Khimsar Fort and Dunes near Jodhpur.

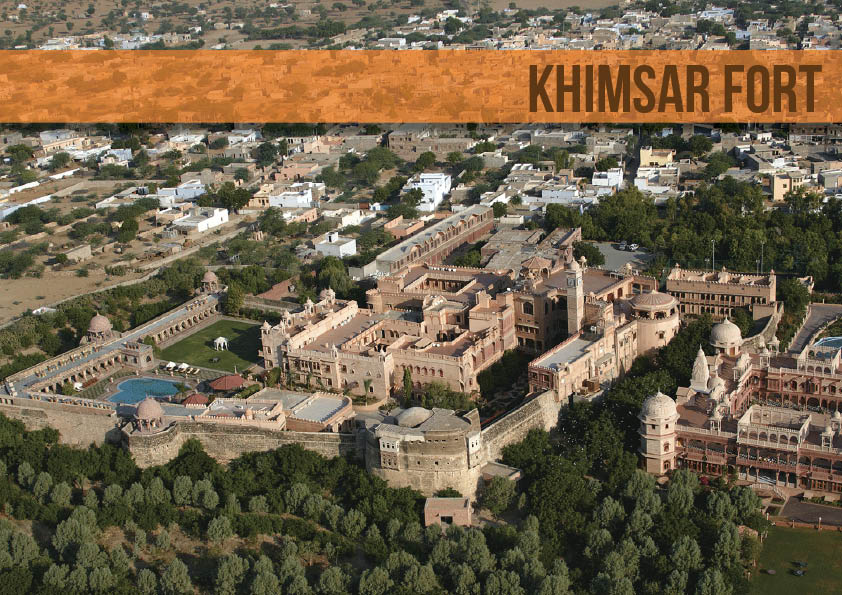
Music In the Hills History

The artists billed as performing at this event were Mohit Chauhan, Parikrama, Advaita, Jasleen Royal and Bobby Cash.

Music in the Hills held its 8th edition to the Hills of Himachal, at Koti, near Shimla, featuring a line up that included, Soulmate, Bobby Cash, Valentine Shipley, Mob Marley, Hari & Sukhmani and Harpreet.

The 9th edition of Music in the Hills took place in Mandawa, Rajasthan, with Happily Unmarried, the kitschy merchandise company, successfully organizing it for the 9th time consecutively. The winter night in Rajasthan was well attended, and bands from around the country performed.

== Music in the Hills festivals ==
The list of festivals organised so far.

1. Music in the Hills 1: Koti, Near Shimla, April 2007(Assorted amateur musicians)
2. Music in the Hills 2: Kasmanda Palace Mussoorie, March 2008. (Belinda & the Tropicanos from Goa & Warsi Brothers from Rampur among others)
3. Music in the Hills 3: Koti, Near Shimla, October 2008. (Valentine Shipley, Indic Myst and Warsi Brothers among others)
4. Music in the hills 4: Naukuchiatal, Uttarakhand, April 2009 (Parikrama, Ankur Tiwary and the Ghalat Family among others)
5. Music in the Hills 5: Koti, Near Shimla, October 2009. (Valentine Shipley, Raghu Dixit Project, Ankur Tiwary and the Ghalat Family among others)
6. Music in the Hills 6: Naukuchiatal, July 2010. (Soulmate, North East Express, Sajid and the lost boys and Warsi Brothers among others)
7. Music in the Hills 7: Khimsar Fort, near Jodhpur, Rajasthan, 13–15 August 2011. (Parikrama and Advaita, Valentine Shipley and Mohit Chauhan.)
8. Music in the Hills 8 at Koti Resort Near Shimla on 6 and 7 April 2012.
