= The Forgotten Woman =

The Forgotten Woman may refer to:

- The Forgotten Woman (1921 film), silent film directed by Park Frame
- The Forgotten Woman (1939 film), film directed by Harold Young
- The Forgotten Woman (2008 film), documentary film directed by Dilip Mehta
