= Vancouver Film Critics Circle Awards 2008 =

Annual Canadian film awards ceremony

The winners of the 9th Vancouver Film Critics Circle Awards, honoring the best in filmmaking in 2008, were announced on January 12, 2009.

== Winners and nominees ==
=== International ===
Best Actor: Sean Penn – Milk

- Frank Langella – Frost/Nixon
- Mickey Rourke – The Wrestler

Best Actress: Kate Winslet – Revolutionary Road and The Reader

- Sally Hawkins – Happy-Go-Lucky
- Meryl Streep – Doubt

Best Director: David Fincher – The Curious Case of Benjamin Button

- Danny Boyle – Slumdog Millionaire
- Gus Van Sant – Milk

Best Film: Milk

- Slumdog Millionaire
- WALL-E

Best Foreign Language Film: The Edge of Heaven (Auf der anderen Seite) • Germany/Turkey/Italy

- Let the Right One In (Låt den rätte komma in) • Sweden
- Tell No One (Ne le dis à personne) • France

Best Supporting Actor: Heath Ledger – The Dark Knight (posthumous)

- Josh Brolin – Milk
- Philip Seymour Hoffman – Doubt

Best Supporting Actress: Rosemarie DeWitt – Rachel Getting Married

- Viola Davis – Doubt
- Marisa Tomei – The Wrestler

=== Canadian ===
Best Actor: Natar Ungalaaq – The Necessities of Life (Ce qu'il faut pour vivre)

- Antoine L'Écuyer – It's Not Me, I Swear! (C'est pas moi, je le jure!)
- Jim Sturgess – Fifty Dead Men Walking

Best Actress: Marianne Fortier – Mommy Is at the Hairdresser's (Maman est chez le coiffeur)

- Julianne Moore – Blindness
- Preity Zinta – Heaven on Earth

Best British Columbia Film: Fifty Dead Men Walking

- Edison and Leo
- Stone of Destiny

Best Director: Philippe Falardeau – It's Not Me, I Swear! (C'est pas moi, je le jure!)

- Atom Egoyan – Adoration
- Deepa Mehta – Heaven on Earth

Best Film: It's Not Me, I Swear! (C'est pas moi, je le jure!)

- Heaven on Earth
- The Necessities of Life (Ce qu'il faut pour vivre)

Best Supporting Actor: Randy Quaid – Real Time

- Gael García Bernal – Blindness
- Mark Ruffalo – Blindness

Best Supporting Actress: Suzanne Clément – It's Not Me, I Swear! (C'est pas moi, je le jure!)

- Maya Ritter – Finn's Girl
- Jayne Eastwood – Real Time
