= Funny Boy (novel) =

1994 novel by Shyam Selvadurai

- First edition
- Author: Shyam Selvadurai
- Language: English
- Subject: Sexuality, diaspora, 1983 Colombo Riots
- Genre: Historical fiction
- Publisher: McClelland & Stewart
- Publication date: 1994
- Publication place: Canada
- Media type: Paperback
- Pages: 328
- ISBN: 0-7710-7951-6
- OCLC: 412624251

Funny Boy is a coming-of-age novel by Sri Lankan-Canadian author Shyam Selvadurai. First published by McClelland and Stewart in September 1994, the novel won the Lambda Literary Award for Gay Fiction and the Books in Canada First Novel Award.

Set in Sri Lanka where Selvadurai grew up, Funny Boy is constructed in the form of six poignant stories about a boy coming to age within a wealthy Tamil family in Colombo. Between the ages of seven and fourteen, he explores his sexual identity, and encounters the Sinhala-Tamil tensions leading up to the 1983 riots.

== Background ==
The novel presents vivid sketches of family members, friends, school teachers, shown co-operating, arguing, loving, and living. The large Tamil family, and its arguments and discussions reflect a specific culture, while in many aspects the problems are universal.

Tension mounts as the riots come closer to home, and the whole family sleeps in their shoes so they can quickly escape should the Sinhalese mobs descend.

When Selvadurai's Funny Boy was published in 1994, it was hailed as one of the most powerful renditions of the trauma of the prevailing ethnic tensions in contemporary Sri Lanka. Selvadurai brings together the struggles of sexuality, ethnicity and class. These issues arise during the development of the protagonist, Arjie, whose maturation is framed against the backdrop of ethnic politics.

In 2006, CBC radio presented a radio dramatization of the novel, directed by filmmaker Deepa Mehta.

Selvadurai has stated that Funny Boy should not be seen as an autobiography. While both he and Arjie are gay and Sri Lankans who immigrated to Canada, they had very different experiences.

== Plot ==
=== Pigs Can't Fly ===
The first part of the novel begins with the spend-the-days, in which the grandchildren congregate at Ammachi and Appachi's home. Arjie and his female cousins, as usual, play their game of "bride-bride", which is interrupted when their cousin Tanuja (Her Fatness) refuses to indulge Arjie's desire to be bride. The adults ultimately discover their game, and one uncle tells Arjie's father "you have a funny one here" (14). Arjie is no longer allowed to play with the girls. When he questions his mother, she responds with "because the sky is so high and pigs can't fly, that's why" (19).

=== Radha Aunty ===
The second chapter focuses on the return of Radha Aunty from America. Radha Aunty and Arjie develop a special relationship, immediately, and both become involved in a performance of The King and I. Although she receives an engagement offer from Rajan Nagendra, she is reluctant and develops a friendship with Anil Jayasinghe, a Sinhalese who is also involved in the play. The extended family warns Radha and encourages her to put an end to the relationship. Radha Aunty goes to Jaffna to forget about Anil, and on her return journey, she and other Tamils are attacked on the train. Eventually, she becomes engaged to Rajan. It is through the friendship between his aunt and Anil that Arjie begins to understand the concept of ethnicity and the Tamil-Sinhalese conflict.

=== See No Evil, Hear No Evil ===
In the third story, while Arjie's father is in Europe on a business trip, Daryl Uncle returns to Sri Lanka from Australia to investigate allegations of government torture. Arjie is cognizant of a long history between Amma and Daryl Uncle but is unsure of the cause of the tensions until he has an eventual realization of their affair. When Arjie becomes very ill, Amma decides to take Arjie from Colombo to the countryside to recover. Much to Arjie's surprise, Daryl Uncle visits Arjie and his mother throughout their stay in the hill country. Following his recovery, Arjie and Amma return to Colombo, while Daryl Uncle goes to Jaffna. When there is news that violence had broken out in Jaffna, Amma becomes worried about Daryl and eventually, they receive word that Daryl's body was found on the beach, supposedly from drowning but they suspect he was killed first. Although Amma tries to pursue the matter further, a civil rights lawyer tells her that there is nothing they can do, given the state of the country, and that "one must be like the three wise monkeys. See no evil, hear no evil, speak no evil" (141).

=== Small Choices ===
In a plot shift, Appa's school friend's son Jegan comes to the family looking for a job and begins to work with Appa at his hotel and also lives with the Chelvaratnam family at their home. Jegan previously associated with the Tamil Tigers, but insists that he has broken all connections with the organization. Jegan also strikes up a friendship with Arjie and for the first time, Arjie feels his homosexual tendencies surface, as Arjie admires "how built he was, the way his thighs pressed against his trousers." The Tamil-Sinhalese tensions build up throughout the story, and Jegan is accused of being involved in a plot to assassinate a Tamil politician who the Tamil Tigers label as a traitor (177). After Jegan's room at the hotel is vandalized, Appa decides it is best to fire Jegan and he leaves with hints that he may retrace back to his violent past (200).

=== The Best School of All ===
Appa decides to transfer Arjie to Victoria Academy, a school he says "will force you to become a man" (210). Arjie catches the eye of a boy named Shehan as well as the notorious school principal. Diggy hints that Shehan is gay and urges Arjie to stay away from him. Arjie notices in himself a growing attraction towards Shehan as the two spend more time together. The principal, nicknamed "Black Tie" ropes in Arjie to recite two poems at an upcoming school function. The function and specific poems are especially important to "Black Tie" as they are his final plea to prevent the government from reorganizing the school. Arjie gets nervous reciting the poems and forgets his lines because he sees a cane waiting for him if he fails at declaiming the poems, and the principal several times beats Arjie as well as later Shehan for failing to help him memorize the poems. One day, Shehan kisses Arjie on the lips and he recoils, but it is after the kiss Arjie begins to comprehend his own sexuality. "I now knew that kiss was somehow connected to what we had in common, and Shehan had known this all along" (250), he says. Later, Arjie and Shehan have their first sexual encounter together in his parents' garage, although it is not completely consensual. Afterwards, Arjie feels ashamed of himself and believes he has failed his family and their trust. However, he soon realizes that this encounter also corresponds to his desire. During the school function, Arjie purposely jumbles up the poems after he witnesses Shehan emotionally break down from Black Tie's beatings. After that, until Arjie emigrated to Canada with his family, Arjie and Shehan had an intimate relationship.

=== Riot Journal: An Epilogue ===
In the final chapter of the novel, rioters start to burn down the Tamil houses and establishments in Colombo. The family escapes to a neighbor's house and goes into hiding after a mob comes to burn down their home. After their own hotel is attacked and Ammachi and Appachi are killed, Appa decides it is time for the family to leave the country. After making love to Shehan for the last time, Arjie leaves Sri Lanka and moves to Canada with his family.

== Important characters ==
- Arjie Chelvaratnam – The novel's protagonist, the story follows his journey of coming to terms with his sexuality as a homosexual boy growing up in Sri Lanka.
- Tanuja/Her Fatness – Arjie's snobbish cousin who dresses up as the groom during their game of "Bride-bride". A jealous cousin who gets Arjie into an embarrassing situation just to gain her superiority in the game of "bride-bride".
- Sonali – Arjie's younger sister. She supports him and understands him when others are harsh on him.
- Diggy – Arjie's brother. A stereotypical character representing what boys should be like. Named Diggy-nose or Diggy due to his habit of poking his nose in all affairs.
- Amma/Nalini – Arjie's mother, and first exposure to femininity. Arjie is fascinated with how she would get ready for special occasions and liked to watch the process.
- Appa – Arjie's father. The head of the family. He makes decisions on behalf of the entire family.
- Ammachi, Appachi – Arjie's grandparents. Well educated and belonging to the upper-middle-class strata of the society. They are killed during a riot when their car is set on fire with Ammachi and Appachi still in it.
- Radha Aunty – Arjie's aunt, and his father's youngest sibling. She returns from school in America and lives with Ammachi and Appachi. Arjie and Radha Aunty have a special bond.
- Anil Jayasinghe – Radha Aunty's romantic interest. Radha's relationship with Anil causes turmoil in the family due to the Sinhalese/Tamil conflict.
- Daryl Uncle – Daryl, a Burgher, is a friend of Amma and previous lover, who returns from Australia to investigate government corruption.
- Jegan Parameswaran – Jegan is the son of a friend of Appa, who comes to work for him. He was a former Tamil Tiger, although only admits to being a part of the Gandhiyam movement.
- Shehan Soyza – Arjie's love interest, whom he meets at the Victoria Academy. He made Arjie fully aware of his sexuality and its uniqueness.
- Black Tie – Very strict principal of the Victoria Academy. Believes that it is possible to extract work from students only by beating them up.
- Andre Arokiyasamy – Very funny short gay at the Victoria Academy, With strong ideology of pursuing his career.

== Themes ==
=== Gender and sexuality ===
Interplay between sexuality and gender is an important underlying theme in the novel, and it is most apparent in the spend-the-day events at the start of the story. Here, Arjie and his cousins enact a marriage scene in their "bride-bride" game. As the leader of the group, Arjie plays the bride, and the children are blissfully unaware of the disjunction between Arjie's male gender and the traditionally feminine role until the arrival of their cousin "Her Fatness". She states, "A boy cannot be the bride. A girl must be the bride" (11). The rest of the family finds out about Arjie's activities and are horrified at the notion of him dressing up in bridal attire. "Her Fatness" is described as large and booming with masculine traits (10) throughout the scene. It is almost as if her masculinity is innocuous, whereas his femininity is a point of contention. Sexuality and gender play an important role in defining the relationships between the characters and their perceptions of one another.

=== Marriage ===
Marriage appears several times throughout the course of the novel, as it is something Arjie is fascinated with. In "Pigs Can't Fly", Arjie and his female cousins reenact a Sri Lankan marriage in the game of "bride-bride". Arjie assumes the most coveted role, that of the bride. The most exciting part of the game is the transformation into the bride. The draping of the white sari, allows him to "leave the constraints of [his] self and ascend into another, more brilliant, more beautiful self, a self to whom this day was dedicated" (5). Marriage serves as a source of bonding with Radha Aunty, who is due to marry Rajan Nagendra.

=== Identity ===
==== Ethnic identity ====
As the novel is set during and at the start of the Sri Lankan civil war, the characters are impacted, and constrained, on an individual level by the tensions between the Sinhalese majority and the Tamil minority, which includes Arjie and his family. For example, the relationship between Radha Aunty and Anil cannot progress because Anil is Sinhalese. Arjie's father foresees the difficulties of being a minority Tamil and enrolls his sons in Sinhalese language classes at school, so that future opportunities are not limited to them. Arjie's father is optimistic and is eager to see the tensions between the two ethnic groups end, and is reluctant to see that the best option for his family is to immigrate to Canada.

==== Sexual identity ====
Stripped to its most fundamental form, the novel documents Arjie's journey to his own sexual identity. His sexuality, while a topic of discussion for his family, is not confronted directly. Instead, he is always referred to as "funny". The only time 'gay' is mentioned in the book is to refer to Amma being happy, stating "Outwardly, she [Amma] seemed happy, almost gay" (154). He recognizes that this term carries a negative connotation, but doesn't understand its complexity, stating that "It was clear to me that I had done something wrong, but what it was I couldn't comprehend" (17). Throughout the novel, Arjie is also increasingly aware of his feelings towards the boys in his school, accepting that he thinks of the shorts they wear and longs to be with them (208). However, he only fully grasps his sexual identity and its familial implications after a sexual encounter with one of his male classmates. Arjie then understands his father's concern and "why there had been such worry in his voice whenever he talked about me. He had been right to try and protect me from what he feared was inside me, but he had failed" (256).

== Tamil diaspora and Sri Lankan Civil War ==
The origin of many important themes in Funny Boy is the increasingly serious tensions between Tamils and Sinhalese while Arjie is growing up in Sri Lanka. This underlying conflict leads to many of the novel's elements of diaspora, identity, and ethnicity found in several sections of Funny Boy.

The broader ethnic tensions in Sri Lanka are addressed and manifest themselves through various instances and interactions in Arjie's life. The relationship between Radha Aunty and Anil is one such example. In this chapter, Arjie begins to learn about the history of the ethnic conflict and begins to realize the magnitude of the impact it may have on his life. Additionally, in "The Best School of All" chapter, Arjie experiences this tension firsthand in many interactions at school.

These themes continue throughout the novel, and their importance in Arjie's life continues to increase until his family is forced into diaspora due to the instability in Sri Lanka and the start of the Civil War, as chronicled by "Riot Journal: An Epilogue".

== Reception ==
The book has found strong positive reception both in scholarly reviews and online reading communities. Edward Hower reviewing the book for The Times wrote “Throughout Funny Boy, Shyam Selvadurai writes as sensitively about the emotional intensity of adolescence as he does about the wonder of childhood. He also paints an affectionate picture of an imperfect family in a lost paradise, struggling to stay together in troubled times.” Richard Eder of Los Angeles Times wrote that “With odd quiet and intimacy, the Sri Lanka novelist Shyam Selvadurai depicts a family’s agony on the fault line of a country cracking apart.”

== Adaptation ==
In 2018, it was announced that Deepa Mehta would adapt the novel into a film. The film was released in December 2020.

== See also ==
- Cinnamon Gardens (novel), another work by Shyam Selvadurai
