= Mostly Sunny (disambiguation) =

Mostly Sunny is a 2016 film directed by Dilip Mehta.

Mostly Sunny or Mostly sunny may also refer to:

- Mostly sunny, term used to describe cloud coverage
- Mostly Sunny, the former title of Ball Park Music's self-titled album
