= Shyam Selvadurai =

Sri Lankan Canadian novelist

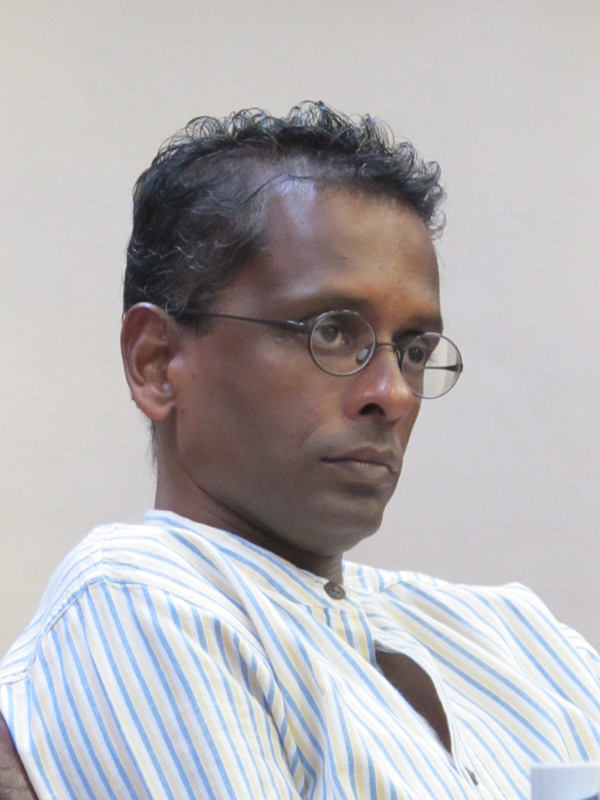
- Born: February 12, 1965 (age 61); Colombo, Western Province, Dominion of Ceylon (now Sri Lanka)
- Occupation: Writer
- Spouse: Andrew Champion
- Writing career
- Period: 1990s-present
- Notable works: Funny Boy, Swimming in the Monsoon Sea

Shyam Selvadurai (born 12 February 1965) is a Sri Lankan Canadian novelist. He is most noted for his 1994 novel Funny Boy, which won the Books in Canada First Novel Award and the Lambda Literary Award for Gay Fiction.

== Background ==
Selvadurai was born in Colombo, Sri Lanka to a Sinhalese mother and a Tamil father—members of conflicting ethnic groups whose troubles form a major theme in his work. Ethnic riots in 1983 drove the family to emigrate to Canada when Selvadurai was nineteen. He attained a BFA at York University for Theatre in 1989, then achieved an MFA in Creative Writing at the University of British Columbia in 2010. Selvadurai recounted an account of the discomfort he and his partner experienced during a period spent in Sri Lanka in 1997 in his essay "Coming Out" in Time Asia's special issue on the Asian diaspora in 2003.

== Writing career ==
Selvadurai published Funny Boy in 1994, and followed up in 1998 with the novel Cinnamon Gardens.

In 2004, Selvadurai edited a collection of short stories: Story-Wallah: Short Fiction from South Asian Writers, which includes works by Salman Rushdie, Monica Ali, and Hanif Kureishi, among others. He published a young adult novel, Swimming in the Monsoon Sea, in 2005. Swimming won the Lambda Literary Award in the Children's and Youth Literature category in 2006. He was a contributor to TOK: Writing the New Toronto, Book 1.

In 2013, he released a fourth novel, The Hungry Ghosts. In 2013 Selvadurai's Funny Boy was included in the syllabus under marginalized study and gay literature of the under graduate English Department of The American College in Madurai. In 2014, he was presented the Bonham Centre Award from The Mark S. Bonham Centre for Sexual Diversity Studies, University of Toronto, for his contributions to the advancement and education of issues around sexual identification.

In 2020, Deepa Mehta released the film Funny Boy, an adaptation of Selvadurai's novel. At the 9th Canadian Screen Awards in 2021, Mehta and Selvadurai won the award for Best Adapted Screenplay.

In 2022, he released Mansions of the Moon, a historical novel about the Buddha’s wife, Yasodhara.

== Personal life ==
He currently lives in Toronto with his partner Andrew Champion.

In 2016, a species of spider was named after Selvadurai called Brignolia Shyami, a small goblin spider which is a pale yellow colour and between 1.4mm and 1.5mm in length.

== Works ==
- Funny Boy. Toronto: McClelland and Stewart, 1994. ISBN 0-7710-7950-8 (and others). Lambda Literary Award for Best Gay Male Novel, and Smithbooks/Books in Canada First Novel Award for 1994
- Cinnamon Gardens. Toronto: McClelland and Stewart, 1998. ISBN 0-7868-6473-7
- Swimming in the Monsoon Sea. Toronto: Tundra, 2005. ISBN 0-88776-735-4. Lambda Literary Award in the Children's and Youth Literature category in 2006
- Story-Wallah: Short Fiction from South Asian Writers. New York: Houghton Mifflin, 2005. ISBN 0-618-57680-0 (editor)
- The Hungry Ghosts. Toronto: Doubleday Canada, 2013. ISBN 0-3856-7066-4
- Many Roads Through Paradise: An Anthology Of Sri Lankan Literature. London: Penguin Books Limited, 2014. ISBN 0-1434-2303-7 (compiler and translator)
- Mansions of the Moon. 2022.
