= At 99: A Portrait of Louise Tandy Murch =

- Directed by: Deepa Mehta; Paul Saltzman
- Produced by: Paul Saltzman
- Starring: Louise Tandy Murch
- Cinematography: Hideaki Kobayashi
- Edited by: Lorne Gould
- Production company: Sunrise Films
- Release date: 1975
- Running time: 24 minutes
- Country: Canada
- Language: English

At 99: A Portrait of Louise Tandy Murch is a Canadian short documentary film, directed by Deepa Mehta and released in 1975. The film centres on Louise Tandy Murch, a 99-year-old retired music teacher who was still living independently in her own home.

Louise Tandy Murch was the mother of painter Walter Tandy Murch, and the grandmother of Academy Award-winning film sound editor Walter Murch.

The film was distributed primarily by broadcast on CBC Television in 1975, although it also had a theatrical screening at the inaugural 1976 Toronto International Film Festival.

The film won the Canadian Film Award for Best Documentary Under 30 Minutes at the 26th Canadian Film Awards in 1975.
