= The Hungry Ghosts (novel) =

2013 a novel by Shyam Selvadurai

- First edition cover (publ. Doubleday Canada)
- Author: Shyam Selvadurai
- Publisher: Doubleday Canada
- Publication date: January 1, 2012
- ISBN: 978-0-385-67066-1

The Hungry Ghosts is a 2013 novel written by Shyam Selvadurai and published by Doubleday Canada.

== Synopsis ==
"The Hungry Ghosts" by Shyam Selvadurai is set between Toronto, Ontario in the 2010s and Colombo, Sri Lanka, during the 1980s and early 1990s. It has a non-linear timeline. It centres on Shivan Rassiah, a young gay man of mixed Tamil and Sinhalese descent, living in Canada. He is preparing to fly to Colombo to retrieve his infirm grandmother and bring her to live in Toronto. His grandmother, the respected matriarch of their family, is very conservative, cunning, and attached to her wealth and property in Colombo. She also strongly disapproves of Shivan's homosexuality. The reader follows Shivan on his travels, as he struggles to make sense of his memories of his youth in Sri Lanka, while also trying to reconcile it with his current life in Canada, which has not proven to be the safe-haven his family imagined when fleeing their home decades earlier.

== Reception ==
=== Reviews ===
The Hungry Ghosts received largely positive reviews. For the Globe and Mail, Hasanthika Sirisena writes, "All of Selvadurai's characters are nuanced with motivations that stem not from their political or ethnic roles, but from raw human longing", and "Selvadurai's work reminds me that the contemporary novel doesn't necessarily have to resort to thrills or high jinks in order to find its usefulness". For Quill and Quire, Steph VanderMeulen writes, "The novel’s non-linear structure is (perhaps intentionally) disorienting... Nevertheless, The Hungry Ghosts is an accomplished, resonant novel." In Now, Susan G. Cole praises the novel: "It’s taken the Sri Lankan-Canadian author 10 years to deliver this, his third novel. It was definitely worth the wait.”

=== Awards and honours ===
The Hungry Ghosts was a national bestseller.

Awards for The Hungry Ghost
Year	Award	Result	Ref.
2013	Governor General's Award for English-language fiction	Shortlist	
2014	DSC Prize for South Asian Literature	Longlist	
2014	Toronto Book Awards	Shortlist	
