= Agam Darshi =

British-Canadian actress (born 1987)

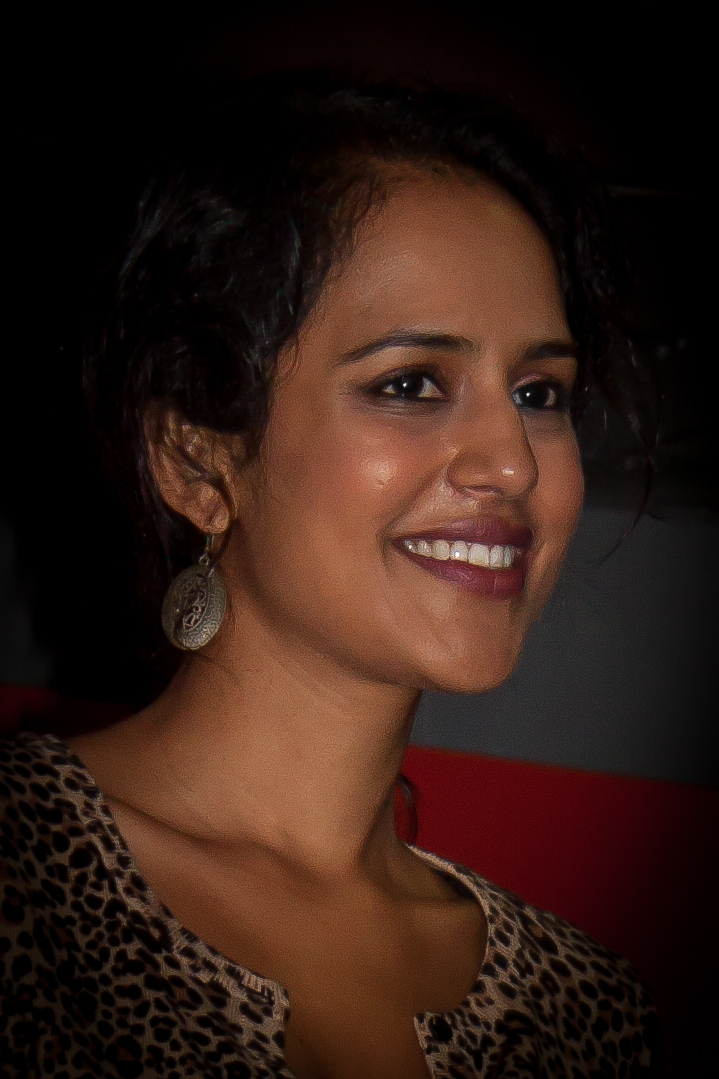
- Darshi at the Armageddon Expo Melbourne, Australia in 2011
- Born: 23 December 1987 (age 38); Birmingham, England, UK
- Occupation: Actress
- Years active: 2004–present
- Spouse: Juan Riedinger
- Children: 2

Agam Darshi (born 23 December 1987) is a British-Canadian actress. She is best known for her role as Kate Freelander in the science fiction series Sanctuary.

== Early life ==
Agam Darshi was born in Birmingham, England, to Sikh parents of Indian Punjabi descent. At a young age she emigrated with her family to Canada, growing up in Montreal, Ottawa, and Vancouver. At the age of 14 she left home and relocated to Calgary, beginning to pursue a career in acting. Darshi studied theatre and fine arts at the University of Calgary, and earned a degree in photography.

== Career ==
Darshi has made appearances in over 25 television productions, and appeared in over a dozen films. She is best known for her roles in Tru Calling, The Dead Zone, The L-Word, and as Laura in the horror film Final Destination 3. She appeared in a recurring role on the Canadian teen-drama television series renegadepress.com. From 2009 to 2011, Darshi appeared in the television series Sanctuary. She was part of the main cast in seasons two and three and had a recurring role in season four.

At the 2013 Leo Awards, Darshi won Best Supporting Performance by a Female in a Motion Picture for her role in the feature Crimes of Mike Recket. Along with fellow South Asian actress Patricia Isaac, she co-founded the Vancouver International South Asian Film Festival (VISAFF). She has also appeared as Ruby Shivani in season 2 of TV serial You Me Her.

In January 2021, Darshi completed made her directorial debut with a film entitled Donkeyhead. The film, in which Darshi also played the lead character, premiered at the 2021 Mosaic International South Asian Film Festival.

Darshi is also a producer, writer, screenwriter, playwright, artist, and graphic designer.

== Personal life ==
Darshi is married to Canadian actor Juan Riedinger; and they have twin sons. She lives in Los Angeles.

== Filmography ==
List of acting performances in film and television
Year	Title	Role	Notes
2004	Pavane for a Dead Skunk	Saviour Woman	Short film
2004	renegadepress.com	Hema / Hemma	3 episodes
2004	Tru Calling	Dawn Pullman	Episode: "Two Pair"
2004	Touching Evil	Lakshmi	Episode: "Grief"
2004	Perfect Romance	Smitten student	TV movie
2004	Pink Ludoos	Pria Dhaliwal	
2004–2008	Stargate Atlantis	Novo / Athosian #2	2 episodes
2005	Reefer Madness	Female Dancer	
2005	Stranger in My Bed	Hotel Clerk	TV movie
2005	Best Friends	Sales Clerk	TV movie
2005	Zixx: Level Two	Jayda	8 episodes
2005–2009	The L Word	Waitress	4 episodes
2006	Final Destination 3	Laura	
2006	Double Cross	Lorraine	TV movie
2006	Supernatural	Jill	Episode: "Hell House"
2006	Civic Duty	Nurse	
2006	49th & Main	Rajanpreet Johal	TV series
2006	The Dead Zone	Tahmina Mahmud	Episode: "Articles of Faith"
2006	Snakes on a Plane	Dell Girl	
2006	Deck the Halls	News Producer	
2006	Masters of Horror	Travel Agent	Episode: "The Screwfly Solution"
2006	Under the Sycamore Tree	Allison	
2007	Good Luck Chuck	Female Wedding Guest	
2007	Kyle XY	Pretty Girl	Episode: "The List Is Life"
2007	Butterfly on a Wheel	APM Secretary	
2007	Psych	Dwyer	Episode: "Meat Is Murder, But Murder Is Also Murder"
2007	American Venus	Ki	
2007	The Haunting of Sorority Row	Rachel	TV movie
2007	Reaper	Bubbly Employee	Episode: "Magic"
2008	Poison Ivy: The Secret Society	Nadia	TV movie
2008	Robson Arms	Sara	Episode: "Prince of Nigeria"
2008	NYC: Tornado Terror	Dog Walker #2	TV movie
2008	The Guard	Darma Singh	6 episodes
2008	Bollywood Beckons	Neeru Singh	Short film
2008	Past Lies	Claudia	TV movie
2009	Playing for Keeps	Maya	TV movie
2009	Watchmen	On Location Reporter	
2009	Impact	Ella Barlow	TV miniseries, Episode: "#1.2"
2009	Almost Audrey	Stephanie	TV movie
2009	Excited	Safira	
2009	Stargate Universe	Dr. Sonja Damji	Episode: "Air: Part 1"
2009	2012	Aparna Tsurutani	
2009–2011	Sanctuary	Kate Freelander	37 episodes
2010	Dan for Mayor	Brianna	12 episodes
2010	A Night for Dying Tigers	Debbie	
2010	Fathers & Sons	Agam	
2011	Normal	Nancy	TV movie
2011	Endgame	Tara	Episode: "Bless This Union"
2011	White Collar Poet	Air	2 episodes
2012	County	Talaikha	TV movie
2012	In Their Skin	Nurse	
2012	The Possession	Court Representative	
2012	Crimes of Mike Recket	Jasleen Recket	
2012	Ring of Fire	Audrey Leems / Audrey Lee	TV miniseries, 2 episodes
2013	Arrow	Anastasia	Episode: "Betrayal"
2013	Played	Khali Bhatt (Main)	13 episodes
2013	Reunion	Her	Short film
2014	Bates Motel	Deputy Patty Lin	2 episodes
2015	Perception	Nasim Shah	Episode: "Mirror"
2016	Brain on Fire	Dr. Khan	
2017	Colossal	Ash	Film
2017	Chokeslam	Dr. Hayden	Film
2017	Dirk Gently's Holistic Detective Agency	Wakti Wapnasi	4 episodes
2017	You Me Her	Ruby Shivani	Recurring role (season 2)
2018	Kingsway	Megan	
2019	The Magicians	Janet Pluchinsky	2 episodes
2020	Funny Boy	Radha	Nominated for the Canadian Screen Award for Best Supporting Actress at the 9th Canadian Screen Awards
2021	The Flash	Mona Taylor / Queen	4 episodes
2021	Donkeyhead	Mona Ghuman	Also director
2023	She Talks to Strangers	Aran	
2024–2025	Sight Unseen	Sunny	Main cast
