= Mansions of the Moon =

2022 novel by Shyam Selvadurai

- Author: Shyam Selvadurai
- Genre: Historical fiction
- Publisher: Knopf Canada
- Publication date: May 10, 2022
- ISBN: 9780735280625

Mansions of the Moon is a 2022 novel written by Shyam Selvadurai and published by Penguin Random House Canada.

== Synopsis ==
Set in sixth century BCE India, the novel tells the story of Yasodhara, the well-born and bright wife of Siddhartha Gautama, the man who became known as the Buddha. It follows Yasodhara's early life, the couple's courtship and marriage, and Siddhartha's decision to leave Yasodhara and their newborn son in pursuit of enlightenment. The story focuses on how Siddhartha's increasingly strong spiritual calling ultimately destroys their once harmonious and blissful partnership. It has strong feminist leanings, highlighting how limited the options were for women abandoned by their husbands during this time, interrogating the exclusion of women from early Buddhist practices, and highlighting the often historically forgotten labour women were forced to do in order to take care of their families while their husbands pursued knowledge and spiritual wisdom.

== Reviews ==
Mansions of the Moon received largely positive reviews. The Globe and Mail listed it as one of the best books of the year, where Harley Rustad describes it as "an elegant tale about the weight of power, relationship and ambition – and the figures who shouldn't stay in the shadows of history".

The Canadian Broadcasting Corporation listed it as one of the best works of Canadian fiction of the year.

For The Guardian, author Shehan Karunatilaka recommended the novel, describing it as "a tenderly and skilfully drawn portrait of Yaśodharā, wife of the Buddha".

In the New York Times, Alida Becker recommended the novel as a piece of "New Historical Fiction to Read".

A Quill & Quire review said: "Selvadurai has created a captivating look at Yasodhara ... in these pages, we see her struggle, hear her fears, and understand her pain ... a testament to Selvadurai's extraordinary empathy and storytelling".

In a Toronto Star article about Mansions of the Moon, Deborah Dundas wrote, "Selvadurai creates immersive, visceral worlds you can almost reach out and feel".
