= Dilip Mehta =

Canadian Indian photojournalist and film director

- Born: 1952 (age 73–74); New Delhi, India
- Occupations: Director; photojournalist
- Notable work: Mostly Sunny
- Relatives: Deepa Mehta (sister)

Dilip Mehta (born 1952 in New Delhi) is an Indian-born Canadian photojournalist and director. Mehta divides his time between New York City, Delhi and Toronto. His work as a photojournalist has appeared in The New York Times, Newsweek, National Geographic and Time. Mehta's five-year coverage of The Bhopal gas tragedy won him numerous prizes including the World Press award and Overseas Press award.

His directorial film debut The Forgotten Woman was inspired by his work on the set of Water. He directed Cooking with Stella (2009) and co-wrote the script with his sister Deepa Mehta. His 2016 documentary Mostly Sunny is a profile of Bollywood actress and former pornographic star Sunny Leone.

== Filmography ==
=== Films ===
Year	Title	Director	Writer	Producer	Stills	Notes
1996	Fire	No	No	No	Yes	Erotic drama film
1998	Earth	No	No	Creative Producer	Yes	Period romance drama
2005	Water	No	No	Associate Producer	No	Drama film
2008	The Forgotten Woman	Yes	No	No	No	Documentary film
2012	Midnight's Children	No	No	(Creative Producer) | (Executive Producer)	No	Based on the novel by Salman Rushdie
2015	The Offer	No	No	Associate Producer	No	Short drama
2009	Cooking with Stella	Yes	Yes	No	No	Comedy film
2016	Mostly Sunny	Yes	Yes	No	No	Documentary film
