= The Forgotten Woman (2008 film) =

- Directed by: Dilip Mehta
- Written by: Deepa Mehta
- Produced by: David Hamilton Producer Noemi Weis - Filmblanc
- Starring: V. Mohini Giri, Indira Jaisingh, Aishwarya Mukherjee, Usha Rai
- Cinematography: Giles Nuttgens
- Edited by: Colin Monie
- Release date: 9 August 2008 (USA)
- Running time: 88 minutes
- Country: Canada
- Languages: English; Hindi; Bengali

The Forgotten Woman is a 2008 Canadian documentary film directed by Dilip Mehta and written by Deepa Mehta, Produced by David Hamilton and Noemi Weis. The film is about widows in India and was inspired by Deepa Mehta's 2005 Academy Award-nominated film on the same subject, Water.

== Cast ==
- V. Mohini Giri as Self
- Aishwarya Mukherjee as Self
- Ginny Shrivastava as Self
- Indira Jaisingh as Self
- Usha Rai as Self

== Synopsis ==
The film The Forgotten Woman was shot in direct response to this interest and aims to increase awareness of the plight and marginalization of many of the millions of widows living in India today who are compelled by long-standing customs to spend their final years alone and shunned by the larger community. The movie examines how these widows, who were forced by their family to give up their belongings, ended up being social outcasts.

The Forgotten Woman seeks to raise awareness of the various and pervasive challenges that still surround women's pursuit of economic independence in the 21st century in order to achieve a semblance of self-respect, self-sufficiency, and fundamental human decency.

== Production ==
The film was primarily shot in Varanasi, Uttar Pradesh.

== Awards ==
- WINNER – Hollywood Film Festival – BEST DOCUMENTARY
- WINNER – Mira Das Doc, Spain – BEST HUMAN RIGHTS DOCUMENTARY
- Selected as part of the Elite Series of the Academy of Motions Pictures (The Oscars)
