= Pieces of a Woman (soundtrack) =

Pieces of a Woman (Music from the Netflix Film)

Film score by Howard Shore
- Released: January 8, 2021
- Recorded: 2020
- Genre: Film score
- Length: 30:03
- Label: Decca
- Producer: Howard Shore

Howard Shore chronology
Funny Boy (2020)	Pieces of a Woman (2021)	Crimes of the Future (2022)

Pieces of a Woman (Music from the Netflix Film) is the soundtrack to the 2020 film Pieces of a Woman directed by Kornél Mundruczó. Featuring musical score composed by Howard Shore, it featured 10 tracks from his score conducted by Ludwig Wicki and performances from Holger Groschopp, Maximilien Werner and Dave Eggar. The soundtrack was released by Decca Records on January 8, 2021.

== Development ==
Shore became involved after he was introduced to Mundruczó by mutual friend Robert Lantos, and the pair collaborated due to Mundruczó's opera background; Mundruczó wanted a score that was classical. In an interview to Jon Burlingame of Variety, Shore opined on the same, adding that "It could have been a piece written for the stage or the concert hall. By taking that approach musically, it has its own independence to the narrative — it enhances it in a way that classical pieces from hundreds of years ago might have a similar effect." They began working on the music during COVID-19 pandemic lockdowns, collaborating remotely with Shore in New York, Mundruczó in Budapest, and the musicians at Teldex Studio in Germany.

Much of the score comprises piano pieces, as well as featuring celesta and oboe, and was said by Maddy Shaw Roberts of Classic FM to guide the audience "through the story in a contemplative, dreamlike manner, accompanying Martha's reckoning". This approach was more than commenting on the action, but also exploring the characters in an emotional, intimate and internal manner. The opening piece of the film is a previously released Shore track, the second movement of his Ruin and Memory piano concerto performed by Lang Lang. The movement is ten minutes long and reflects the action of the film's 24-minute opening scene; following this, the music becomes "gradually thornier" as the story progresses, at times displaying discomfort.

Shore wanted to express the perspectives of Martha and of her child through his music, showing both grief and hope; He wrote two themes for the characters. Though he does not have a theme, Sean is often represented with darker music — mixing electronic textures into the orchestral music. The themes representing Martha and the baby recur throughout the film, including the baby's theme playing while Martha solemnly watches other children, and pieces of Ruin and Memory are repurposed in other parts of the score. At the end of the film, a new melody, which was "partly improvised" by Holger Groschopp, is used to represent Martha moving on.

== Track listing ==
No.	Title	Featured artist(s)	Length
1.	"Ruin & Memory — Concerto for Piano and Orchestra Movement II: Largo"	Ludwig Wicki; Holger Groschopp	10:13
2.	"Motherhood"	Wicki; Groschopp	2:47
3.	"Family"	Wicki; Maximilien Werner	1:38
4.	"The Nursery"	Wicki; Groschopp	3:00
5.	"Yvette"	Wicki; Groschopp; Werner	2:19
6.	"Mystic River"	Wicki; Groschopp	1:16
7.	"Elizabeth"	Groschopp	1:30
8.	"Waltz in F Major"	Wolfgang Köhler; Bene Aperdannier	2:11
9.	"Pieces of a Woman"	Wicki	1:41
10.	"Home"	Dave Eggar	3:28
Total length:			30:03

== Reception ==
According to music critic Jonathan Broxton, "Shore’s score is well-crafted and perfectly-attenuated; it accentuates and enhances Martha’s emotional rawness in a way that feels empathetic, and allows the viewer and listener to experience her pain without the music coming across as manipulative or maudlin. Finally, from a musical point of view, the score sees Shore writing sensitively for a small ensemble that really highlights the deft work of the soloists." He further concluded that the music "leaves a strong impression, and will appeal to anyone whose appreciation for Howard Shore extends beyond hobbits and elves". Lee Marshall of Screen International described it as "moving, delicate and trenchant". Morgan Rojas of Cinemacy wrote that Shore's "composition of light piano strokes and harmonic vocals play like a baby’s lullaby". David Rooney of The Hollywood Reporter criticized the score as "intrusive".

== Accolades ==
Pieces of a Woman's original score was disqualified from shortlisting in the Best Original Score category at the 93rd Academy Awards as only 40% of the score cues were used in the film; according to the Academy of Motion Picture Arts and Sciences, 60% of the original music should be used in the film so that it should be eligible for nomination.

Award	Date of ceremony	Category	Recipient(s)	Result	Ref.
Hollywood Music in Media Awards	January 27, 2021	Best Original Score in a Feature Film	Howard Shore	Nominated	
