= Bollywood/Hollywood =

Canadian romantic comedy drama film

- Theatrical release poster
- Directed by: Deepa Mehta
- Written by: Deepa Mehta
- Produced by: Deepa Mehta
- Starring: Rahul Khanna; Lisa Ray; Moushumi Chatterjee
- Cinematography: Douglas Koch
- Edited by: Barry Farrell
- Music by: Sandeep Chowta
- Production company: IDream Productions
- Distributed by: Mongrel Media
- Release date: 25 October 2002 (Canada)
- Running time: 105 minutes
- Country: Canada
- Languages: English; Hindi

Bollywood/Hollywood is a 2002 Canadian romantic comedy drama film directed by Deepa Mehta and starring Rahul Khanna and Lisa Ray.

The film pokes fun at traditional Indian stereotypes, as well as at Indian cinema (it features several Indian film-style song-and-dance numbers). Akshaye Khanna – a brother of Rahul – makes a cameo appearance in the film.

== Plot ==
Rahul Seth, a wealthy young Indian-Canadian, is pressured by his widowed mother to marry a “proper” Indian girl before his pregnant sister Twinky can wed her fiancé Bobby. Still grieving the accidental death of his white pop-singer girlfriend Kimberly, Rahul reluctantly agrees, especially since his mother threatens to halt Twinky’s marriage to protect the family’s reputation. At a bar, he meets Sue, a woman he mistakes for a Spanish escort, and hires her to act as his Indian fiancée to satisfy his mother’s wishes.

As the charade continues, Rahul learns that Sue (Sunita) is actually Indian. Though initially upset at her deception, he is drawn to her bold, mischievous nature and the way she bonds with his insecure younger brother, Govind. Their relationship grows stronger, but trouble arises when Sue is falsely accused of being a prostitute at Bobby’s bachelor party. Hurt by Rahul’s doubt, Sue leaves, and Rahul is forced to admit the truth to his family, shattering his mother’s hopes for a respectable wedding. Meanwhile, Twinky takes matters into her own hands and elopes with Bobby.

Encouraged by his witty driver Rocky, his Shakespeare-quoting grandmother, and even the ghosts of his father and Kimberly, Rahul realizes that he truly loves Sue. In a dramatic balcony scene at her home, he confesses his feelings, only to be playfully rejected at first. But Sue surprises him by reappearing as his chauffeur, symbolizing her acceptance of his love. The story concludes with reconciliation, family acceptance, and a joyous celebration, blending the melodrama, humor, and romance of Bollywood with a Canadian twist.

== Cast ==
- Rahul Khanna as Rahul Seth
- Lisa Ray as Sue / Sunita Singh
- Moushumi Chatterjee as Rahul's Mom
- Dina Pathak as Rahul's Grandma
- Kulbhushan Kharbanda as Mr. Singh, Sue's Papa
- Ranjit Chowdhry as Rocky
- Jessica Paré as Kimberly
- Rishma Malik as Twinky Seth
- Jazz Mann as Bobby
- Arjun Lombardi-Singh as Go / Govind
- Neelam Mansingh as Mrs. Singh, Sue's Mom
- Killer Khalsa / Mike Deol as Killer Khalsa
- Jolly Bader as Rahul's ghostly Dad
- Akshaye Khanna as himself

== Music ==
Bollywood Hollywood

Soundtrack album by Sandeep Chowta
- Released: 17 March 2009 (India)
- Genre: Feature film soundtrack
- Length: 44:04
- Label: Times Music

Sandeep Chowta chronology
Jaani Dushman: Ek Anokhi Kahani	Bollywood Hollywood	Road

The music, which is composed by Sandeep Chowta, received good reviews.

Track list
No.	Title	Artist(s)	Length
1.	"Rang Rang"	Sonu Nigam, Alisha Chinoy	4:03
2.	"Sooni Hawa (Male)"	Sonu Nigam	4:58
3.	"Dil Kabootar Khana Hai"	Sonu Nigam	3:47
4.	"Krishna Hare (Female)"	Sowmya Raoh	4:32
5.	"Sona Sona Roop Hai"	Sonu Nigam, Alisha Chinoy	4:54
6.	"If the Shoe Fits"	Sunita Sarathy	4:19
7.	"Sooni Hawa (Female)"	Sowmya Raoh	4:58
8.	"Chin Chin Choo"	Sanjiv Wadhawani	3:51
9.	"Krishna Hare (Male)"	Rajesh	4:31
10.	"Salsa"	Instrumental	3:11

== Reception ==
=== Critical response ===
Bollywood/Hollywood was met with "mixed reviews", and has a rating of 41% on review aggregator Rotten Tomatoes, based on 46 reviews.

=== Accolades ===
At the 23rd Genie Awards, presented in February 2003, the film received five nominations: Best Motion Picture, Best Original Screenplay (Deepa Mehta), Best Actor in a Supporting Role (Ranjit Chowdhry), and Best Actress in a Supporting Role (Dina Pathak) and (Moushmi Chatterji). Mehta won the Genie for Best Original Screenplay.

Bollywood/Hollywood also won the Student Jury Award at the Newport International Film Festival, the Audience Award (Best Comedy) at the Sarasota Film Festival, and the Best Director (Canadian Film) at the Vancouver Film Critics Circle.
