= Anatomy of Violence =

2016 film

- Directed by: Deepa Mehta
- Produced by: David Hamilton
- Starring: Jagjeet Sandhu; Vansh Bhardwaj; Suman jha; Tia Bhatia; Janki Bisht; Seema Biswas
- Cinematography: Maithili Venkataraman
- Production company: Hamilton Mehta Productions
- Release date: 12 September 2016 (TIFF)
- Running time: 93 minutes
- Country: Canada
- Language: Hindi

Anatomy of Violence is a Canadian drama film which premiered at the 2016 Toronto International Film Festival. Directed by Toronto-based filmmaker Deepa Mehta, the film explores the root causes leading up to the 2012 Delhi gang rape incident.

The film's script was created by a group of actors including Vansh Bhardwaj, Tia Bhatia, Janki Bisht and Seema Biswas, through improvisational exercises based on the relatively few snippets of known information about the perpetrators of the attack. Mehta chose to pursue a significant departure from her usual filmmaking style, in part because of the uncharacteristically poor reviews that greeted her previous film Beeba Boys.

== Plot ==
In New Delhi in 2012, a group of six guys raped a young woman and beat her male friend up in a moving bus. On a fictitious reenactment of the perpetrators' life, eleven actors worked together.

== Cast ==
- Vansh Bhardwaj
- Janki Bisht
- Mukti Ravi Das
- Ramanjit Kaur
- Jagjeet Sandhu
- Tia Bhatia
- Seema Biswas
- Suman Jha
- Mahesh Saini
- Zorawar Shukla

== Awards ==
Year	Award	Category	Result	Ref
2016	Toronto International Film Festival	First Premiere	Nominated	
2017	Human Rights Film Festival	Gender-based violence in India	Nominated	

== Reception ==
- Mehta's documentary approach eventually catches up with actual broadcast material, but not enough to excuse the irresponsible use of point-and-shoot cameras that flattens the film's narrative and visual richness.
- Formally and philosophically, Anatomy of Violence is the biggest gamble of Mehta's career since it foresees uncharted territory for cinema. Is it a docudrama, mockumentary, hybrid, or true crime film? All of these and none of them make up the anatomy of violence. It's Mehta-fiction, to be precise.
