= Heaven on Earth (2008 film) =

2008 Canadian film by Deepa Mehta

- Theatrical release poster
- Directed by: Deepa Mehta
- Written by: Deepa Mehta
- Produced by: Deepa Mehta; Ravi Chopra; David Hamilton
- Starring: Preity Zinta; Vansh Bhardwaj
- Cinematography: Giles Nuttgens
- Edited by: Colin Monie
- Music by: Mychael Danna; Hari & Sukhmani (folk song: Kangi Bawan)
- Distributed by: Hamilton-Mehta Productions Inc. National Film Board of Canada
- Release date: 24 October 2008
- Running time: 106 min
- Countries: Canada; India
- Languages: English; Hindi; Punjabi

Heaven on Earth a.k.a. Videsh is a 2008 Canadian film directed and written by Deepa Mehta. Preity Zinta plays the leading role of Chand, a young Indian Punjabi woman who finds herself in an abusive arranged marriage with an Indo-Canadian man, played by theatre actor Vansh Bhardwaj. The film released in India dubbed into Hindi under the title Videsh. Zinta received unanimous acclaim for her performance in both Canada and India.

== Plot ==
Vibrant Chand is a young bride leaving her home in Ludhiana, Punjab, India, for Brampton, Ontario, Canada, where her husband Rocky and his very traditional family await her arrival. Everything is new and unfamiliar to Chand including the quiet and shy Rocky who she meets for the first time at the Arrivals level of Pearson Airport. Chand approaches her new life and land with equanimity and grace, and at times the wide-eyed optimism of hope—her first snowfall is a tiny miracle of beauty, and the roar of Niagara Falls creates the excitement of new beginnings.

But soon optimism turns to isolation as the family she has inherited struggles beneath the weight of unspoken words, their collective frustration becoming palpable. No one feels the pressure more than Rocky, weighed down by familial obligations. Maji, his controlling mother, won't let him go; Papaji, is a sweet but ineffectual father; Aman, his sister, who feels the embarrassment of living in the same house with her unemployed husband Baldev, their teenaged son Jabir and younger daughter, Lovleen. All live with Rocky and Chand in a two-bedroom house in the suburbs of Toronto. To make matters worse, Rocky is expected to find the money to bring more of his new extended family to Canada. Unable to express his anger, he finds other ways to release it and it's Chand who bears the brunt of his repressed rage.

Trapped in a world she cannot comprehend and unable to please her husband, Chand is desperate. Hope comes in the form of Rosa, a tough and savvy Jamaican woman who works alongside Chand in a factory where immigrant women from all over the world clean and press dirty hotel laundry. Rosa sees past the make-up that covers Chand's bruised face. Realizing Chand has nowhere to turn, Rosa gives her a magical root advising her "to put it in whatever the bastard drinks." The root is supposed to seduce the one who takes it, making them fall hopelessly in love with the person who gives it to them. Chand's attempts with the magic root lead to surreal incidents and her life gradually begins to mirror an Indian fable involving a King Cobra. As the lines between fantasy and reality converge, Chand and Rocky come face to face with each other and themselves. Eventually, Chand comprehends all the surreal episodes in her life and upon separation from her husband decides to go back to India.

== Cast ==
- Preity Zinta as Chand Kaur Dhillon
- Gick Grewal as Chand's mother
- Vansh Bhardwaj as Rocky Singh Dhillon
- Orville Maciel as Kabir Singh Dhillon
- Ramanjit Kaur as Aman Badola
- Balinder Johal as Maji
- Rajinder Singh Cheema as Papaji
- Gourrav Sihan as Baldev Singh Dhillon
- Yanna McIntosh as Rosa

== Production ==
Deepa Mehta penned the screenplay in 2007. She met Preity Zinta at the 2007 International Indian Film Academy Awards and offered her the role of a Punjabi housewife. Initially, Zinta could not commit to the project due to schedule conflicts, but they were worked out and Zinta signed on to play the role. Seema Biswas, who was part of Mehta's previous project Water was also chosen to be part of the cast, but she eventually did not act. Mehta, who saw The Last Lear (2007) starring Zinta in the lead female role, said "I think Preity is perfect!". Yet she organized an acting workshop for Zinta in Toronto, which Zinta attended in September "to understand and come to grips with the character's milieu and body language. I think Preity can look very, very Punjabi." said Mehta.

Principal photography for Heaven on Earth commenced in November 2007 and concluded at the end of December 2007. The film was primarily shot in Toronto and Brampton, Canada, with additional location shooting in Punjab, India, where it was completed. For the film, the folktronic duo Hari & Sukhmani produced the folk song Kangi Bawan.

== Reception ==
The film was screened at the Toronto International Film Festival, the Edmonton International Film Festival, and the Kingston Canadian Film Festival. It was released in select Canadian theatres on 24 October 2008 to generally mixed reviews, but full praise for Zinta's performance. The Vancouver Sun wrote, "Bollywood star Zinta and her Canadian co-star Bhardwaj are nothing short of genius". According to S. James Wegg, Chand is "beautifully created by Preity Zinta who grows with the role that few her age could master". Variety wrote "Zinta, who appears in nearly every scene … undertake[s] a stunning psychological transformation". Wendy Mitchell of Screen Daily noted, Zinta ... poignantly plays against the ‘cool-chick’ persona for which she is renowned on the Bollywood circuit." Will Sloan of Exclaim! magazine wrote, "Her performance here is a revelation, infusing her role with surprising depth and pathos." Susan G. Cole praised the film, calling it "a film that has real power".

In India, the film generated little notice or discussion and received mostly negative reviews upon release, though Preity Zinta was universally praised for her portrayal, which several critics considered her best. Sukanya Verma of Rediff.com rated the film 2/5 stars, concluding, "Watch Videsh for Preity Zinta".

== Awards ==
Won

- 2008 Chicago International Film Festival, Best Actress (Silver Hugo) award for Preity Zinta
- 2008 Dubai International Film Festival, Best Screenplay (Muhr Award) - Deepa Mehta.
- 2010 Stardust Awards, Searchlight Award for Best Actress - Preity Zinta

Nominated

- 29th Genie Awards
  - Best Performance by an Actress in a Leading Role - Preity Zinta
  - Best Original Screenplay - Deepa Mehta
- 2008 Vancouver Film Critics Circle Awards
  - Best Canadian Film
  - Best Director of a Canadian Film - Deepa Mehta
  - Best Actress in a Canadian Film - Preity Zinta
