= 49th & Main =

49th & Main is a CBC Television soap opera. It premiered on July 18, 2006, at 2:30 P.M. (3:00 P.M. in Newfoundland), and ran for 6 episodes on a Tuesday/Wednesday/Thursday scheduling setup, with the final episode having aired on July 27.

The series is set in the Punjabi Market district of Vancouver, British Columbia. Much like ITV's Coronation Street, 49th & Main focuses on the interactions of the businesspeople, merchants and residents of the multicultural area. In particular, the series revolves around Dr. Cedric Ferreira, a Kenyan-born Indian with an English upbringing, who decides to bring his young son to Canada and start a medical practice.

The cast of 49th & Main includes Cedric de Souza (in the role of Dr. Ferreira), as well as Rekha Sharma, Agam Darshi, Brandon Jay McLaren, Balinder Johal and William B. Davis. Davis is also the co-writer of the first six episodes and directed three of them, with the other three directed by Tom Braidwood. The six episodes were taped in Vancouver in March and April 2006, and an initial pilot was shot in early 2005. Executive Producers of the series are William Wallace Gray and William B. Davis. Creators are Barbara Ellison & William B. Davis.

49th & Main is one of two CBC daytime dramas scheduled for 6-episode runs in July with the potential of a future order from the CBC for a full-scale on-going series. The other one was North/South, which premiered on July 4 in the 2:30 P.M. timeslot.

== Episodes ==
All episodes of 49th & Main are titled after famous books.

1. Brave New World (July 18, 2006)
2. Look Homeward, Angel (July 19, 2006)
3. Beautiful Losers (July 20, 2006)
4. East of Eden (July 25, 2006)
5. In the Heat of the Night (July 26, 2006)
6. Tigers and Traitors (July 27, 2006)
