= Kasmanda Palace =

Coordinates: 30°27′35″N 78°04′10″E

Kasmanda Palace is a historic hotel in Mussoorie, Uttarakhand, India. It was originally built in 1836 by Captain Rennie Tailour of the Bengal Engineers as part of the Christ Church complex. Over time, the building was used as a sanatorium for British soldiers during the Crimean War (1853–1856) and later became a school that operated from 1896 to 1910. In 1915, it was purchased by the ruling family of Kasmanda, a former princely state in Oudh, for use as a summer residence.

== History ==
Kasmanda Palace was originally constructed in 1836 by Captain Rennie Tailour of the Bengal Engineers as part of the Christ Church complex in Mussoorie. During the mid‑19th century, it served as a sanatorium for British troops, notably during the Crimean War period, and was later converted into one of Mussoorie’s first schools, operating until 1910. In 1915, the estate was purchased by the ruling family of Kasmanda, a former taluqdari house of Awadh and became their summer residence for six successive generations. The main building was finally converted into a heritage boutique hotel in 1992 under Rajkumar Dinraj Pratap Singhji and Kunwarani Saheba Yadu Nandini Singh of Kasmanda.

== Architecture ==
Kasmanda Palace is designed in Anglo‑French colonial style, with its white‑plastered masonry walls and steep red‑sloping roofs set against three acres of pine‑forested lawns. The two‑storey mansion is laid out around a central courtyard, approached via a broad, colonnaded veranda that wraps the ground floor, while dormered attic windows and quoined corners add to its Victorian‑era elegance. Internally, the grand wooden staircase leads to 24 uniquely appointed rooms, each retaining period features such as carved wooden doors, marble flooring, and imported wrought‑iron balustrades. The surrounding Magnolia gardens, planted in the early 20th century by Rajmata Vidyawati Devi of Kasmanda, provide both shade and seasonal floral displays.
