= Cinnamon Gardens (novel) =

1998 novel written by Shyam Selvadurai

Cinnamon Gardens is a 1998 novel written by Shyam Selvadurai.

== Synopsis ==
The story is set in the 1920s in Cinnamon Gardens, a residential enclave of wealthy Ceylonese of Colombo, Sri Lanka. It depicts the political unrest at the end of Britain's colonial rule. The novel illustrates the socio-political climate of 1920s Sri Lanka, which helps to elucidate many of the issues that continue to plague modern-day Sri Lanka. There are two protagonists: Annalukshmi and Balendran. Annalukshmi is an unmarried schoolteacher who idolizes the British, proto-feminist headteacher at her school. She aspires to advance in her career and take on a similar leadership role one day, but her traditional family disapproves of her ambitions and wants her to marry and have children. She also must struggle against the white supremacy in Sri Lanka, which reserves positions of authority for British expats, making career advancement all the more unattainable for a young Tamil woman. Balendran is Annalukshmi's uncle. He is peacefully married and wealthy, having found success working under his powerful father. However, the visit of Richard, a former lover from England makes Balendran question his tendency to blindly follow the repressive social codes of his community. The history and tension between the two men reignite hostilities between Balendran and his father.

== Awards, reviews and honours ==
- Cinnamon Gardens was shortlisted for the Trillium Book Award in 1998. It was also shortlisted for the Premio Internazionale Riccardo Bacchelli in Italy and the Aloa Literary Award in Denmark in 1999.
- Daniel Rietz, for the New York Times Book Review, described the book as "faultlessly elegant" and called Selvadurai an "expert in capturing the nuances of this particularly precious time and place".
- The Canadian Book Review Annual concluded, "Although this novel is an interesting experiment in Sri Lankan Gothic, most of the time it reads like a Harlequin romance."
