= Cooking with Stella =

- Movie poster
- Directed by: Dilip Mehta
- Written by: Deepa Mehta; Dilip Mehta
- Starring: Seema Biswas; Lisa Ray; Don McKellar; Maury Chaykin
- Release date: 16 September 2009 (Toronto International Film Festival)
- Running time: 104 minutes
- Country: Canada

Cooking with Stella is a 2009 film written by siblings Deepa Mehta and Dilip Mehta. The film is a light comedy about a Canadian diplomat (Lisa Ray) and her husband (Don McKellar) living in New Delhi, and their cook, Stella (Seema Biswas). Indian actress Shriya Saran makes a special appearance. Cooking with Stella was shot on location in New Delhi, and entered post-production in May 2008. It premiered at the Toronto International Film Festival on 16 September 2009. The film was also nominated at London Asian Film Festival under Best Crossover film category and best actress for Seema Biswas.

== Plot ==
When a Canadian diplomat and her chef husband move into the Canadian High Commission in Delhi, they threaten to derail the schemes of the longtime cook Stella (Seema Biswas) who has been skimming off the top for years.

== Cast ==
- Seema Biswas as Stella
- Lisa Ray as Maya
- Don McKellar as Michael
- Maury Chaykin as H.E. Mr. Durand

== Production ==
Pre-production for the film began in 2007 under the title Stella starring Brendan Fraser, Vidya Balan and R. Madhavan.

== Awards ==
Year	Award	Category	Result	Ref
2009	Valladolid International Film Festival	Best Film	Official Selection	
2011	London Asian Film Festival	Best Actor Female	Nominated	
