= Mostly Sunny =

2016 film by Dilip Mehta

- Directed by: Dilip Mehta
- Written by: Deepa Mehta; Dilip Mehta; J. Craig Thompson
- Produced by: Craig Thompson
- Distributed by: Mongrel Media
- Release date: 11 September 2016 (TIFF)
- Running time: 84 minutes
- Country: Canada
- Languages: English, Hindi

Mostly Sunny is a 2016 Canadian documentary directed by Dilip Mehta. The film presents a biography of actress Sunny Leone.

== Synopsis ==
Sunny Leone is a Canadian-born actress who moved to the United States and established a career in pornographic cinema. She then became a major star in India's Bollywood film industry. Footage of Leone was filmed in Canada, India, Malaysia, the United Kingdom and the United States.

== Release ==
Mostly Sunny premiered at the Toronto International Film Festival on 11 September 2016. It was given a limited release in Canadian theatres on 13 January 2017.

== Controversy ==
During the promotion of the film, Sunny wanted any frontal nudity to be removed in an attempt to reinvent her image in Bollywood. However, Dilip refused to make any changes, leading to Sunny shunning the movie's premiere during the Toronto International Film Festival, and going so far as not being on talking terms with the director. The official response from Sunny was that she was attending a Bar Mitzvah in New York, hence the lack of promotions.

== Reception ==
Norman Wilner of Toronto's Now weekly panned the production, indicating that Mehta was "padding it with montages and even retelling stories in order to fill time.". As of 2017, the movie currently has a 33% rating on Rotten Tomatoes.
