= Donkeyhead =

2021 Canadian film by Agam Darshi

- Directed by: Agam Darshi
- Written by: Agam Darshi
- Produced by: Kelly Balon; Anand Ramayya
- Starring: Agam Darshi; Stephen Lobo; Sandy Sidhu; Husein Madhavji
- Production company: Karma Film
- Distributed by: Level Film; Super Channel; ARRAY; Netflix
- Release dates: December 1, 2021 (MISAFF); January 21, 2022 (Netflix)
- Country: Canada
- Language: English
- Budget: $2 million

Donkeyhead is a 2021 Canadian comedy-drama film written and directed by Agam Darshi in her directorial debut. The plot follows Mona Ghuman, a woman tasked with taking care of her father with the help of her three siblings after he is diagnosed with cancer and his health starts to deteriorate. The film premiered at the Mosaic International South Asian Film Festival in Mississauga, Ontario, on December 1, 2021. It was digitally released on Netflix on January 21, 2022. It received generally positive reviews from critics.

== Premise ==
Mona is a failed writer who carves out a life of isolation while caring for her ailing Sikh father. When he suffers a debilitating stroke, her three successful siblings show up on her doorstep determined to take control of the situation.

== Cast ==
- Agam Darshi as Mona Ghuman
- Stephen Lobo as Parm Ghuman
- Sandy Sidhu as Sandy Ghuman
- Husein Madhavji as Rup Ghuman
- Kim Coates as Brent Maloney
- Marvin Ishmael as Gurpreet Ghuman
- Balinder Johal as Puaji

== Production ==
Filming began in Regina, Saskatchewan, on January 18, 2021, on a $2 million budget. Due to the COVID-19 pandemic, the film's crew had to follow various safety measures and protocols, such as getting tested frequently for the virus, practicing social distancing, and wearing facemasks while on set. According to co-producer Kelly Balon, the pandemic resulted in an additional $50,000 in production costs. Filming concluded after a month on February 12, after shooting scenes in various locations around the city, including at the Fat Badger, Hotel Saskatchewan, several funeral homes, and an old house at Victoria Avenue. Marian Wihak was the film's production designer.

== Release ==
The film premiered at the Mosaic International South Asian Film Festival in Mississauga, Ontario, on December 1, 2021. It was theatrically released in Canada by Level Film and digitally by Super Channel. In the United States, the film was released by ARRAY and Netflix on January 21, 2022.

== Reception ==
On the review aggregator website Rotten Tomatoes, 92% of 12 critics' reviews are positive, with an average rating of 6.4/10. Writing for the Los Angeles Times, Carlos Aguilar praised Darshi's performance and compared it to Anne Hathaway's role in Rachel Getting Married (2008). Beatrice Loayza from The New York Times criticized the screenplay and called the lead character "a stereotypically troubled woman whose eventual awakening merits a shrug at most." Aparita Bhandari of The Globe and Mail said, "Even if Darshi hasn't written Mona from personal experience, she clearly knows the character intimately, and gives Mona a kind of stubborn vulnerability that's totally relatable."

The film was shortlisted for Best Direction in a Feature Film at the 2022 Directors Guild of Canada awards.
