= Midnight's Children (film) =

2012 film by Deepa Mehta

- Theatrical release poster
- Directed by: Deepa Mehta
- Screenplay by: Salman Rushdie
- Based on: Midnight's Children by Salman Rushdie
- Produced by: David Hamilton; Doug Mankoff; Steven Silver; Neil Tabatznik; Andrew Spaulding
- Starring: Satya Bhabha; Shriya Saran; Shabana Azmi; Anupam Kher; Ronit Roy; Siddharth; Shahana Goswami; Samrat Chakrabarti; Rahul Bose; Seema Biswas; Darsheel Safary
- Cinematography: Giles Nuttgens
- Edited by: Colin Monie
- Music by: Nitin Sawhney
- Distributed by: Mongrel Media (Canada); Entertainment One (United Kingdom); Paladin; 108 Media (United States); PVR Pictures (India)
- Release dates: 9 September 2012 (Toronto International Film Festival); 26 October 2012 (India)
- Running time: 148 minutes
- Countries: Canada; United Kingdom; United States; India
- Languages: English; Hindi
- Box office: $884,100

Midnight's Children is a 2012 film adaptation of Salman Rushdie's 1981 novel. The film features an ensemble cast of Satya Bhabha, Shriya Saran, Siddharth, Ronit Roy, Anupam Kher, Shabana Azmi, Kulbhushan Kharbanda, Seema Biswas, Shahana Goswami, Samrat Chakrabarti, Rahul Bose, Soha Ali Khan, Anita Majumdar and Darsheel Safary. With a screenplay by Rushdie and directed by Deepa Mehta, the film began principal photography in Colombo, Sri Lanka, in February 2011 and wrapped in May 2011. Shooting was kept a secret as Mehta feared protests by Islamic fundamentalist groups.

The film was shown at the Toronto International Film Festival, the Vancouver International Film Festival, and the BFI London Film Festival. The film was also a nominee for Best Picture and seven other categories at the 1st Canadian Screen Awards, winning two awards.

== Plot ==
The film begins with narrator Saleem Sinai describing his birth at the exact moment of Indian independence. His narrative then jumps back to 1917 Kashmir where his grandfather Dr. Aadam Aziz goes to the Ghani mansion to assess the landlord's sick daughter Nasim, whom the doctor eventually marries. Then the film jumps to Agra in 1942, where Saleem describes his grandfather as contracting a 'disease of optimism' of those times and being an ardent supporter of politician Mian Abdullah. Abdullah is assassinated returning from a party with his secretary Nadir Khan, but Nadir flees to Dr. Aziz's house where Aziz shelters him in his cellar. Aziz and Nasim have three daughters, Alia, Mumtaz and Emerald, and during Nadir's stay Mumtaz develops a bond with him resulting in their private marriage. Soon the marriage is broken up when General Zulfikar learns of his presence in the cellar.

Devastated by the divorce, Mumtaz finds solace in the arms of wealthy entrepreneur Ahmed Sinai. The two marry and move to Bombay where they buy a villa from wealthy Englishman William Methwold, and Mumtaz takes up a new name, Amina Sinai. At the villa an accordionist, Wee Willie Winkie and his wife, used to come to sing and entertain and it transpires that the wife is carrying Methwold's child. Amina too is carrying a child then. Both go into labour on 14 August and give birth to boys at the moment of India's independence. However a nurse Mary, driven by love for her revolutionary partner, decides to switch the name tags of the two rich and poor infants, altering their fates. Mary is soon consumed by guilt and tries to make amends by deciding to become Saleem's ayah (nanny). Saleem, meant for poverty, has a life of privilege and Shiva, the one meant for fortune, leads an impoverished life on the streets. But things are not ideal for Saleem as his family pressures him to be different and special, and his father becomes an alcoholic. Saleem soon starts hearing voices which he realises he can control, and discovers these are the voices of the other Midnight's Children born in the first hour of independence, all of whom have special powers. The most prominent of them however are Shiva, Parvati-the-witch who is Saleem's only supporter, and Saleem himself with telepathic capabilities.

Wanting to make good use of his power he forms the Midnight's Children's conference, destined to serve the nation. But things go against him as an accident reveals that Saleem's blood type doesn't match his parents, revealing that he's not his parents' true child. In shock they send him away to his aunt Emerald, now the wife of General Zulfikar and living in Pakistan. In exile Saleem learns about power, politics and struggle. He grows distraught by the divisions in the conference caused by the loss of innocence and the seeping of language and class differences amongst the members, and he disbands it. He is eventually recalled back to his family which has now moved to Karachi, but finds that his father has still not accepted him. Mary realises that the only way to make amends is by telling his parents about the swapping of the name tags at birth. Enraged by this, Saleem's father forces him to undergo an operation on his enormous and constantly dripping nose.

Some years later the Indo-Pakistani War of 1965 starts, during which Saleem's parents are killed when their house is bombed. Being injured in the bombing, he suffers a memory loss and wakes up in 1971. He is then enrolled in the army for his sniffing skills and becomes part of a crew sent to fight in East Pakistan which, with the help of India, becomes Bangladesh. Still suffering amnesia, he joins a celebrating crowd including victorious Indian soldiers led by Shiva, now a war-hero owing to his powers, and also some magicians from India including Parvati-the-witch. Recognising Saleem she calls to him, breaking his spell of amnesia, and introduces him to snake charmer Picture Singh, the magicians' leader. On hearing of Saleem's tough journey Parvati takes him to the conjurers ghetto in New Delhi, smuggling him over the border in her basket of invisibility. They fall in love but Saleem, ambitious to do something big, leaves Parvati giving an excuse that he can't marry her because he is impotent. Realising the futility of his ambitions he returns but finds Parvati is expecting a baby by Shiva, whom she had summoned to visit her by casting a spell. Saleem says he will raise it as his own son and the baby, named Aadam, becomes one of many forming the next generation of magical children being born at the moment of the declaration of Emergency by the Prime Minister Indira Gandhi.

Gandhi, an ardent believer in horoscopes, is advised that the Midnight's Children have powers that are a threat to her supremacy, and so under the guise of a sterilisation programme she orders their incarceration. Shiva, leading the project and in search of Saleem, bulldozes the entire ghetto (killing countless) and captures Saleem. Under torture Saleem gives information about the other children, who are soon incarcerated and sterilized to drain their powers. The Emergency ends when the PM is defeated in an election, the children are all simultaneously released (the guards all having abandoned the complex into the night) and Shiva dies in a road accident as he attempts to flee the country pursued by authorities for his crimes. Saleem finds his son living with Picture Singh, who tells him Parvati died in the ghetto clearance. Reunited, the three have lunch at a restaurant where Saleem realizes the chutney he is eating is similar to the chutney his ayah Mary used to prepare for him in childhood. He obtains the address of the Bombay-based chutney company and they set out to find it. There Saleem and Mary, the company's owner, are overjoyed to be reunited and the film concludes as Saleem's son, Aadam, utters his first-ever word.

== Cast ==
- Satya Bhabha as Saleem Sinai
  - Darsheel Safary as Young Saleem
- Shriya Saran as Parvati-the-witch
- Siddharth as Shiva
- Anupam Kher as Ghani
- Shabana Azmi as Naseem
  - Neha Mahajan as Young Naseem
- Seema Biswas as Mary
- Charles Dance as William Methwold
- Samrat Chakrabarti as Wee Willie Winkie
- Rajat Kapoor as Aadam Aziz
- Soha Ali Khan as Jamila
- Rahul Bose as Zulfikar
- Anita Majumdar as Emerald
- Shahana Goswami as Amina
- Chandan Roy Sanyal as Joseph D'Costa
- Ronit Roy as Ahmed Sinai
- Kulbhushan Kharbanda as Picture Singh
- Shikha Talsania as Alia
- Zaib Shaikh as Nadir Khan
- Sarita Choudhury as Indira Gandhi
- Vinay Pathak as Hardy
- Kapila Jeyawardena as Governor
- Ranvir Shorey as Laurel
- Suresh Menon as Field Marshal
- G.R Perera as Astrologer
- Rajesh Khera
- Salman Rushdie, narrator
- Samila Vidanage (cameo)

== Production ==
In 2008, Mehta and Salman Rushdie decided to collaborate on a film together. At first Mehta wanted to adapt his novel Shalimar the Clown, but she eventually decided on Midnight's Children instead. Rushdie spent the next two years paring down the 600-page book into a 130-page script. Rushdie told the BBC in an interview that he sold the rights to the film for $1.

The casting process began in early 2010. For the role of the protagonist Saleem Sinai, Mehta wanted Imran Khan, but his salary was outside of the film's budget. She decided to cast British actor Satya Bhabha instead after seeing video of him performing in a play. Kangana Ranaut and Rani Mukerji were originally cast as Emerald and Amina, but both had to be replaced due to scheduling conflicts. Irrfan Khan was also forced to pull out due to conflicts with Life of Pi and Nandita Das opted out of the film after she had her first child. Rahul Bose (who had earlier been slated to play Saleem in the BBC's aborted version of the novel) was selected for the role of Emerald's husband Zulfikar and Shabana Azmi was cast as Saleem's grandmother Naseem.

Principal shooting began in February 2011 in Colombo, Sri Lanka as Mehta feared protests by Muslim fundamentalists if the film was shot in Pakistan and by Indian National Congress & Gandhi family loyalists if it was made in Mumbai. Cast members had secrecy clauses added to their contracts to help keep the production quiet. Production design was handled by Mehta's brother Dilip Mehta. Under his direction, authentic Delhi-style furniture, props and costumes were shipped in from India. Shooting was briefly interrupted when Iran complained to the Sri Lanka government about the film and the crew was ordered to halt production. Mehta appealed to President Mahinda Rajapaksa who agreed to let filming continue. Winds of Change was the working title of the film during the shooting. Filming lasted a total of 69 days from February to May 2011. In all, 800 extras were used.

== Release ==
The film premiered on 9 September 2012 at the Toronto International Film Festival with repeat screenings on the 10th and 27th. The film had its Indian premiere on 10 December 2012 at the 17th International Film Festival of Kerala. After the premiere show, Indian National Congress leaders came against the movie alleging that the film portrays former Indian Prime Minister Indira Gandhi and some other leaders in a negative manner. Following the allegations, any further screening of the film in the festival was stopped, an act which drew heavy criticism.

After initial fears that the movie would not find a distributor in India, the distribution rights were acquired by the Mumbai-based company PVR Pictures. In India, the film was released on 1 February 2013 with minimal cuts owing to clever casting & script treatment by Mehta. "Deepa Mehta didn't want to draw any attention to Sarita Chowdhary who plays Mrs Gandhi but looks nothing like her. The whole strategy was to not focus attention on the character and the actress playing the role."

== Critical reception ==
Nishi Tiwari for Rediff.com gave 3 out of 5 stars and said: "Midnight's Children is a must watch for people who’ve yearned to experience Salman Rushdie iconic storytelling in a more accessible format." On Rotten Tomatoes it has a 41% rating based on 59 reviews. The website's critical consensus states that "Though Midnight's Children is beautiful to look at and poignant in spots, its script is too indulgent and Deepa Mehta's direction, though ambitious, fails to bring the story together cohesively." Claudia Puig of USA Today wrote: "There are some beautiful moments and some decent performances, but it's also something of a slog and ultimately fails to engage on an emotional level". Liam Lacy of The Globe and Mail called it "Watchable without ever feeling essential."

For an academic overview of the adaptations of Midnight's Children, see Mendes and Kuortti (2016).
