= Funny Boy (film) =

2020 Canadian drama film

- Film poster
- Directed by: Deepa Mehta
- Screenplay by: Deepa Mehta; Shyam Selvadurai
- Produced by: David Hamilton
- Starring: Nimmi Harasgama; Ali Kazmi; Agam Darshi; Seema Biswas; Rehan Mudannayake; Shivantha Wijesinha; Brandon Ingram
- Cinematography: Douglas Koch
- Edited by: Teresa Font
- Music by: Howard Shore
- Distributed by: ARRAY; Netflix
- Release date: December 4, 2020
- Countries: Canada; Sri Lanka
- Languages: English; Tamil; Sinhala

Funny Boy is a 2020 drama film, directed by Deepa Mehta. An adaptation of Shyam Selvadurai's 1994 novel of the same name, the film centres on the coming of age of Arjie Chelvaratnam, a young Tamil boy in Sri Lanka who is coming to terms with his homosexuality against the backdrop of the increased tensions between Tamil and Sinhalese people before the breakout of the Sri Lankan Civil War.

Shot on location in Chennai and Colombo, the film stars Arush Nand as Arjie in childhood and Brandon Ingram as Arjie in his teenage years, as well as Nimmi Harasgama, Ali Kazmi, Agam Darshi, Seema Biswas, Rehan Mudannayake and Shivantha Wijesinha. Its production was first announced in 2018. The film had a theatrical release in Canada and selected cities in the United States, and was distributed internationally via Netflix. The movie rights for the United States have been acquired by Ava DuVernay’s ARRAY Releasing who handled worldwide distribution.

It was broadcast December 4, 2020, on CBC Television and was released for streaming on CBC Gem the same day. It was selected as the Canadian entry for the Best International Feature Film at the 93rd Academy Awards, but was disqualified from that category by the Academy of Motion Picture Arts and Sciences due to not meeting the academy's requirement that fifty percent of the dialogue be in a language other than English.

== Cast ==
- Arush Nand as younger Arjie
- Brandon Ingram as older Arjie
- Nimmi Harasgama as Amma / Nalini
- Ali Kazmi as Chelva
- Seema Biswas as Ammachi
- Agam Darshi as Radha
- Ruvin De Silva as Anil
- Shivantha Wijesinha as Jegan
- Rehan Mudannayake as Shehan

== Controversies ==
Following the trailer, opposition towards the film grew regarding the lack of Tamil actors in the cast despite the film's focus on the Tamil characters. In response, Mehta stated that while she initially cast Tamil actors in the film, they were unable to continue for various reasons, including refugee statuses interfering with visa applications, and the fear of making a film about homosexuality, which is still illegal in Sri Lanka. She claims to have had difficulty finding additional Tamil actors willing to be part of a gay film. Because of the lack of native Tamil speakers from Sri Lanka in Mehta's depiction of Funny Boy, the Tamil language spoken in the film was described as disjointed and sometimes unintelligible. There have also been claims that the inaccuracies in the language contribute to the erasure of the Tamil identity. Mehta responded to the criticisms surrounding the Tamil language by sending the film to India for dubbing post-production. After screening the final film, some members of the community have said that while the Tamil spoken in the revised version is better than the original, it is still not the Tamil spoken in Sri Lanka.

Selvadurai himself responded to the casting controversy by directly comparing the political and social pressures that affected actors' willingness to appear in the film with the political and social pressures he had written about in the novel: "What are the political structures that don’t allow you to come out? The patriarchy. And that same patriarchy is applied to the nationalist discourse, which results in these kinds of civil wars, or war, period. All my work comes from, in a way, queering the discourse around nation and state and race.”

== Reception ==
=== Critical response ===
The film received positive reviews from critics. On Rotten Tomatoes, the film holds an approval rating of 82% based on 33 reviews, with an average rating of 6.6/10. On Metacritic, the film has an aggregated score of 62 out of 100 based on 9 reviews, indicating "generally favorable reviews".

Andrew Parker of The Gate stated that "Funny Boy handles both of the material's main angles with respect and compassion, which is a testament to Selvadurai's source material and some of Mehta's strongest visuals to date....this story can be viewed as another great example of how human rights abuses are allowed to run rampant because those experiencing them are staying silent in a bid to go along with the nationalistic flow." Tracy Brown of the Los Angeles Times wrote that "It's both precious and refreshing when queer characters in coming-of-age stories fall in love without having to overcome any inner turmoil over their identities, so Arjie and Shehan's story is plenty heartwarming." Jude Dry of IndieWire gave the film a grade of A−, writing that it "is a luminous coming-of-age tale seen through the eyes of a relatable yet entirely unique experience." Deborah Young of The Hollywood Reporter wrote: "Vividly drawn characters portrayed by a lively, likable cast in a seductive tropical atmosphere make this a welcome return of Toronto-based Mehta to filming her native Indian subcontinent."

Chris Knight of the National Post rated it 3 stars out of 5 and stated that "Certainly a little background into the conflict would help non-Tamil viewers find their footing. Even so, Funny Boy remains at one level approachably universal in its appeal." Cath Clarke of The Guardian also gave it 3/5 stars, praising the first half of the film but criticizing the second half; she concluded: "In the end the story is told rather blandly, the edges sentimentally smoothed down." Kevin Maher of The Times gave the film 2/5 stars, describing it as "a film of thoughtful themes (the poison of intolerance), crudely emblematic scenes and overwritten dialogue", and added: "Worst of all, it soft-sells the horror of ethnic cleansing, with a climactic neighbourhood massacre reduced to a few broken windows and some offensive chanting." Roxana Hadadi of RogerEbert.com gave the film 2/4 stars, writing that it "falters when trying to link together the personal and political, making for a well-intentioned film that never delivers much depth."

While holding Mehta accountable, Tina Hassannia of The Globe and Mail questioned Ava DuVernay's ARRAY distributing the film, writing that "the pioneering American director, a vocal supporter for onscreen representation, might have wanted to question the casting decisions of Funny Boy before taking it on.”

The film was named to TIFF's year-end Canada's Top Ten list for feature films.

=== Awards and nominations ===
| Award | Date of ceremony | Category | Nominees | Result | Reference |
|---|---|---|---|---|---|
| Canadian Screen Awards | May 20, 2021 | Best Picture | David Hamilton, Hussain Amarshi | Nominated | |
| Canadian Screen Awards | May 20, 2021 | Best Director | Deepa Mehta | Won | |
| Canadian Screen Awards | May 20, 2021 | Best Supporting Actress | Agam Darshi | Nominated | |
| Canadian Screen Awards | May 20, 2021 | Best Adapted Screenplay | Deepa Mehta, Shyam Selvadurai | Won | |
| Canadian Screen Awards | May 20, 2021 | Best Sound Editing | James Sizemore, Jane Tattersall, David McCallum, Steve Medeiros, Krystin Hunter, Stefan Fraticelli, Jason Charbonneau | Nominated | |
| Canadian Screen Awards | May 20, 2021 | Best Sound Mixing | Lou Solakofski, Joe Morrow, Randy Wilson, Ron Melgers | Nominated | |
| Canadian Screen Awards | May 20, 2021 | Best Original Score | Howard Shore | Won | |
| Canadian Screen Awards | May 20, 2021 | Best Makeup | Elizabeth Gruszka | Nominated | |
| Canadian Screen Awards | May 20, 2021 | Best Visual Effects | Peter McAuley, Michael Bishop, Derek Gebhart, Armen Bunag, Luke White, James Marin, Marco Polsinelli, Andrew Rolfe, Davor Celar | Nominated | |

== See also ==
- Funny Boy (soundtrack)
