= David Hamilton (Canadian producer) =

Canadian film producer

David Hamilton is a Canadian film producer. Hamilton has been nominated on two occasions for the Genie Award for Best Motion Picture (later merged into the Canadian Screen Awards) for the films Bollywood/Hollywood and Water.

== Filmography ==
- Fire (1996)
- Lunch with Charles (2001)
- Bollywood/Hollywood (2002)
- Water (2005)
- Midnight's Children (2012)
- Beeba Boys (2015)
- Anatomy of Violence (2016)
- Funny Boy (2020)
