= Newport International Film Festival =

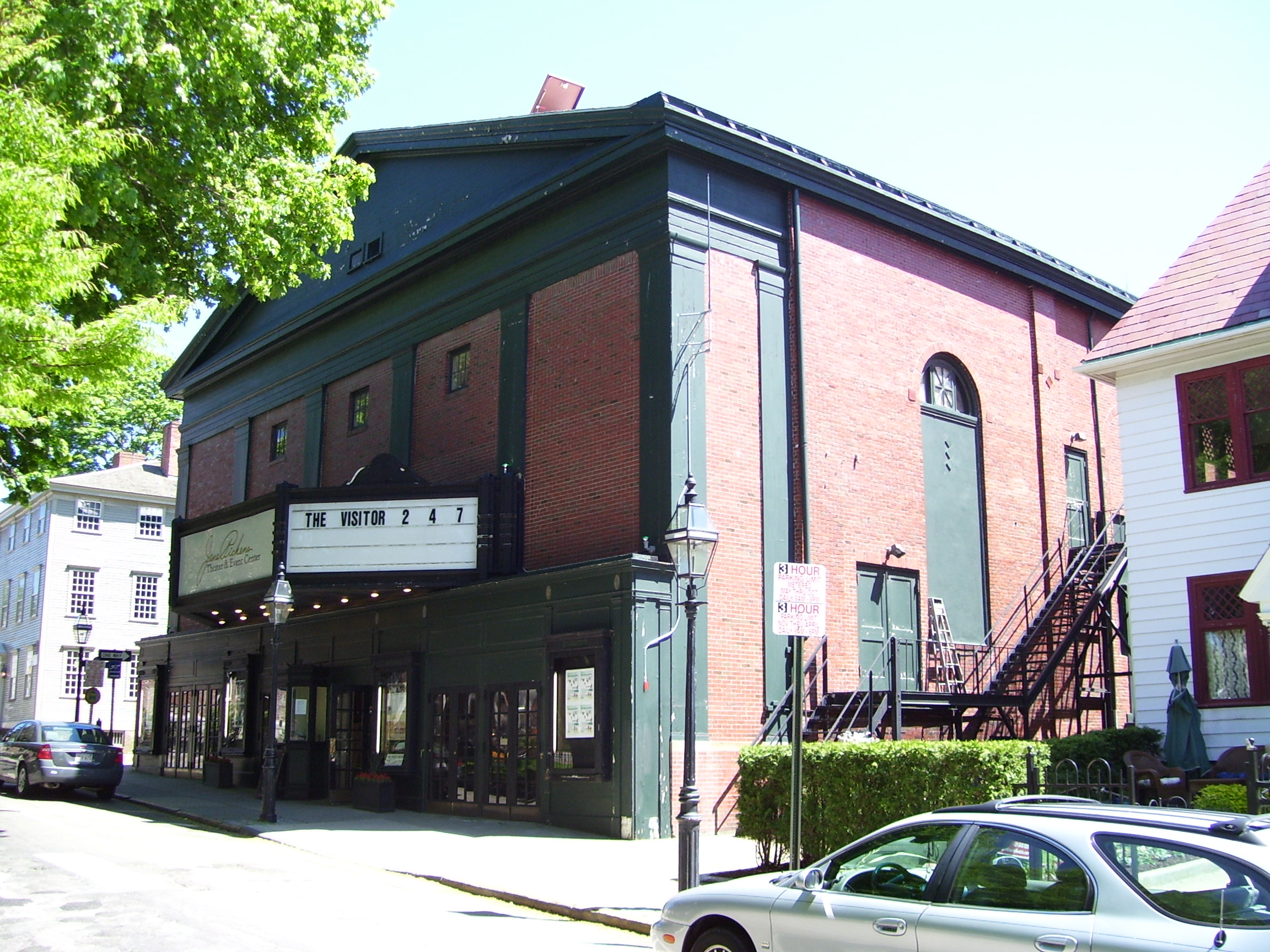
Jane Pickens Theater on Washington Square in Newport, built by Russell Warren. As of 2016, is Newport's only active movie theater

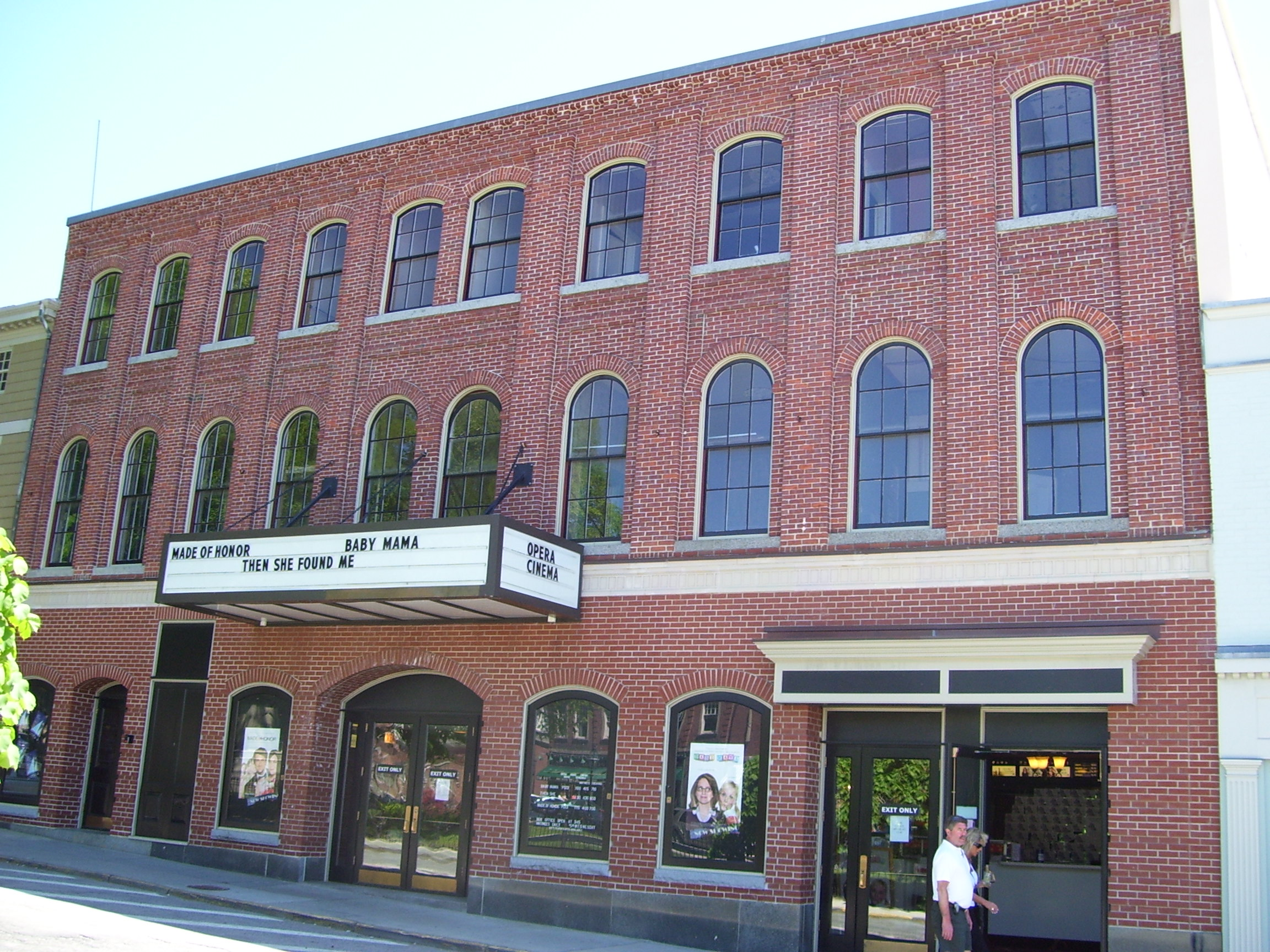
Opera House Theater on Washington Square in Newport. Currently under renovations and no longer screening films

Newport International Film Festival was an annual film festival in Newport, Rhode Island, established in 1998.

The Newport Film Festival was generally held the first week in June and featured various international films at several local cinemas. In 1998, Christine Schomer, Nancy Donahoe, and Pami Shamir co-founded the festival.

The last festival scheduled was June 3 to 7, 2009.

The last festival's executive director was Jennifer Maizel.

The festival's screenings, venues and Newport itinerary have largely been absorbed into two festivals: Its successor NewportFILM and to a lesser extent, the pre-existing Rhode Island International Film Festival. As with the Newport International Film Festival, both festivals offer Newport screenings at the Jane Pickens Theater, the city's only movie theater.
