= Deepa Mehta =

Indian-born Canadian film director and screenwriter (born 1950)

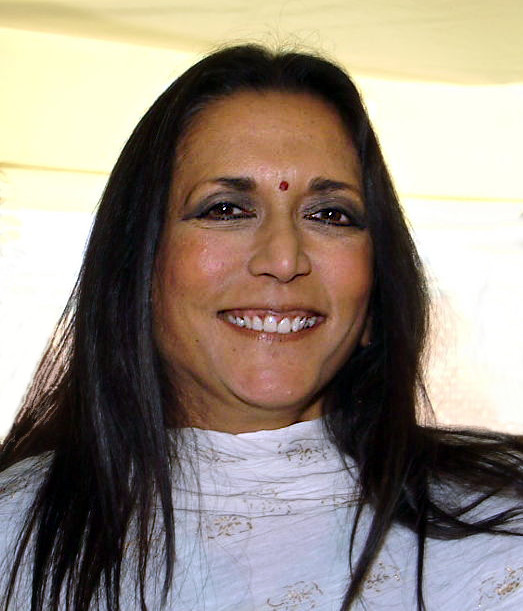
- Deepa Mehta in 2005
- Born: 15 September 1950 (age 76); Amritsar, Punjab, India
- Occupations: Film director, screenwriter, film producer
- Years active: 1976–present
- Known for: Elements Trilogy
- Spouse(s): Paul Saltzman (m. 1973; div. 1983) David Hamilton (– present)
- Children: Devyani Saltzman (daughter)
- Relatives: Dilip Mehta (brother)
- Website: www.hamiltonmehta.com

Deepa Mehta, OC OOnt ([diːpa ˈmeːɦta]; born 15 September 1950) is an Indian-born Canadian film director and screenwriter, best known for her Elements trilogy, Fire (1996), Earth (1998), and Water (2005), the last being nominated for Best Foreign Language Film at the Academy Awards.

Earth was submitted by India as its official entry for the Academy Award for Best Foreign Language Film, and Water was Canada's official entry for the Academy Award for Best Foreign Language Film, making it only the third non-French-language Canadian film submitted in that category after Attila Bertalan's 1990 invented-language film A Bullet to the Head and Zacharias Kunuk's 2001 Inuktitut-language feature Atanarjuat: The Fast Runner.

She co-founded Hamilton-Mehta Productions, with her husband, producer David Hamilton in 1996. She was awarded a Genie Award in 2003 for the screenplay of Bollywood/Hollywood. In May 2012, Mehta received the Governor General's Performing Arts Award for Lifetime Artistic Achievement, Canada's highest honor in the performing arts.

== Early life ==
Mehta was born in Amritsar, Punjab near the militarized border of Pakistan and experienced firsthand the impacts brought forth by the Partition of India. She describes learning about warfare from citizens of Lahore, stating "Even when I was growing up in Amritsar, we used to go every weekend to Lahore, so I just grew up around people who talked about it incessantly and felt it was one of the most horrific sectarian wars they knew of."

Her family moved to New Delhi while she was still a child, and her father worked as a film distributor. Subsequently, Mehta attended Welham Girls High School, boarding school in Dehradun on the foothills of Himalayas. She graduated from the Lady Shri Ram College for Women, University of Delhi with a degree in Philosophy.

Mehta notes how her reception to film transformed and changed as she got older and was exposed to different types of cinema, which ultimately influenced her to become a filmmaker herself. She states:

"When I was growing up in Delhi and I went to university in Delhi, I used to watch [Indian] films. I grew up with a very healthy dose of Indian commercial cinema. My father was a film distributor, so from a very young age I saw commercial Indian cinema. But once I went to university, or even my last year of school, I really started watching and enjoying Satyajit Ray and Ritwik Ghatak and had exposure to non-Hindi cinema and non-Hollywood cinema. At university, I was also exposed to directors like Truffaut and Godard. There was also intense exposure to Japanese cinema. So, Ozu, Mizoguchi."

== Career ==
After graduating Mehta began working for a production company that made documentary and educational films for the Indian government. During the production of her first feature-length documentary focusing on the working life of a child bride, she met and married Canadian documentary filmmaker Paul Saltzman, who was in India making a film. She migrated to Toronto to live with her husband in 1973, and was credited in some of her early films as Deepa Saltzman.

Once in Canada, Mehta and Saltzman along with Mehta's brother Dilip started Sunrise Films, a production company, initially producing documentaries but moved into television production creating the television series Spread Your Wings (1977–79) about the creative and artistic work of young people from around the world. Additionally, Mehta directed several episodes of the Saltzman produced CBC drama Danger Bay (1984–90).

Mehta also directed the documentaries At 99: A Portrait of Louise Tandy Murch (1975) and Traveling Light (1986), the latter focusing on the work of Mehta's brother Dilip as a photojournalist. Traveling Light would go on to be nominated for three Gemini Awards. In 1987, based on the works of Alice Munro, Cynthia Flood and Betty Lambert, Mehta produced and co-directed Martha, Ruth and Edie. Screened at the Cannes International Film Festival, it would go on to win the Best Feature Film Award at the 11th International Film Festival in Florence in 1988.

In 1991 she made her feature-film directorial debut with Sam & Me, a story of the relationship between a young Indian boy and an elderly Jewish gentleman in the Toronto neighborhood of Parkdale. It broke the record at the time for the highest-budgeted film directed by a woman in Canada at $11 million. It won Honorable Mention in the Camera d'Or category of the 1991 Cannes Film Festival. Mehta followed this with her film Camilla starring Bridget Fonda and Jessica Tandy in 1994. In 2002, she directed Bollywood/Hollywood, for which she won the Genie Award for Best Original Screenplay.

Mehta directed two episodes of George Lucas' television series The Young Indiana Jones Chronicles. The first episode, "Benares, January 1910", aired in 1993. The second episode was aired in 1996 as part of a TV movie titled Young Indiana Jones: Travels with Father.

Mehta directed several English-language films set in Canada, including The Republic of Love (2003) and Heaven on Earth (2008) which deals with domestic violence and has Preity Zinta playing the female lead. It premiered at the 2008 Toronto International Film Festival. Also in 2008, Mehta produced the documentary The Forgotten Woman, directed by her brother Dilip.

In 2005, it was announced that Mehta would film an adaptation of Shilpi Somaya Gowda’s Secret Daughter with an ensemble cast of Amitabh Bachchan, John Abraham, Seema Biswas, and Terence Stamp with Nandita Das, Manisha Koirala, Mahima Chaudhry, and Padma Lakshmi in supporting roles. The film, titled Exclusion, was to have music by A. R. Rahman, and cinematography and editing by Giles Nuttgens and Colin Monie respectively. It would have been based on the Komagata Maru incident, an incident where Canada turned away 397 Indian dissidents as a part of a policy to keep Canada racially white. Although the project was postponed for many years, the film remained unrealized.

In 2015, Mehta wrote and directed Beeba Boys. It premiered at the 2015 Toronto International Film Festival.

In 2016, Mehta directed the drama film Anatomy of Violence, which uses fiction to explore the root causes which led to the 2012 Delhi gang rape and murder.

On 29 October 2020, Telefilm Canada announced that Mehta's film Funny Boy (2020) would represent Canada's official entry in the race for Academy Award for Best International Feature Film. However, the film was disqualified by the AMPAS as its mix of English, Sinhala and Tamil dialogue did not surpass the required percentage of non-English dialogue.

At the 9th Canadian Screen Awards in 2021, Mehta won the Best Director award for Funny Boy. She and cowriter Shyam Selvadurai also won the award for Best Adapted Screenplay.

In November 2021, Variety announced that Mehta is set to direct a film adaptation of Avni Doshi's novel Burnt Sugar, with Ben Silverman's Propagate Content producing the film.

=== Elements trilogy ===
Mehta is best known for her Elements trilogy — Fire (1996), Earth (1998), and Water (2005) — which won her international critical acclaim. Some notable actors who have worked in this trilogy are Aamir Khan, Seema Biswas, Shabana Azmi, Kulbhushan Kharbanda, John Abraham, Rahul Khanna, Lisa Ray, and Nandita Das. These films are also notable for Mehta's collaborative work with author Bapsi Sidhwa. Sidhwa's novel Cracking India (1991, U.S.; 1992, India; originally published as Ice Candy Man, 1988, England) is the basis for Mehta's 1998 film Earth.

Mehta describes the conception of the idea for the Elements films to be extremely organic. She first conceived of the idea for Water while shooting in Varanasi, stating "You know, you read about widows - my grandmother is a widow - but I had never seen such institutionalization of widows until I went to Varanasi. There was a widow there called Gyanvati who was about 80 years old, and through her I got to know about ashrams and found it very moving. I thought that if I make a film, it would be about something surrounding widows; then I forgot about it. Then I wrote Fire."

After completing the filming process for Fire, Mehta told Shabana Azmi that her next film would be an adaptation of Bapsi Sidwha's Cracking India; when Azmi asked what it would be called, Mehta replied: "Earth". Mehta maintains that each film centers on politics of a certain phenomenon.

Fire follows the love affair between two sisters-in-law whose own sexless marriages bring them together in a passionate romance. It caused controversy upon its release as several Hindutva groups took issue with its central lesbian romance, one that was seen to break traditional family and religious value within society, as there were protests in cities across India. Internationally, the film was critically acclaimed and would go on to win the Most Popular Canadian Film at the Vancouver International Film Festival. This was also the first feature length dramatic film which Mehta both wrote and directed, a practice which she would continue throughout the rest of her career.

Earth focuses on the time before and during the Partition of India and Pakistan in 1947 and how the life of one family was uprooted by this historical event. The central focus for Earth was intended to be about "the division of the earth, but it is also metaphoric- what does our matrubhoomi (motherland) mean to us?" The film resembled Mehta's own family history as her parents fled the newly created Pakistan in 1947 whilst Mehta herself was born in Punjab, not far from the Indian/Pakistan border.

Water is about is an eight-year-old girl who is suddenly widowed. In keeping with traditions of widowhood, she is left in an ashram, where she is to live from then on. The film, meant to be shot in India, was attacked by Hindu fundamentalists who saw the film as disrespectful and who took issues with Mehta's earlier films and their portrayal of Hindu culture. The regional government overruled the permission given from the central government to the production which allowed them to film in the holy city of Varanasi. Eventually the production moved to Sri Lanka. Water opened the 2005 Toronto International Film Festival and was nominated for an Academy Award for Best Foreign Language Film in 2006.

=== Midnight's Children ===
Mehta directed Midnight's Children after collaborating on the screenplay with the novel's author, Salman Rushdie. Indian American actor Satya Bhabha played the role of Saleem Sinai while other roles were played by Shriya Saran, Seema Biswas, Shabana Azmi, Anupam Kher, Siddharth Narayan, Rahul Bose, Soha Ali Khan, Shahana Goswami and Darsheel Safary.

The film was released on 9 September 2012 at Toronto International Film Festival and would be nominated for Best Motion Picture along with 7 other nominations at the Canadian Screen Awards.

== Themes ==
Many of Mehta's films across her career have focused on the duality of her national and cultural identity which has informed much of her filmmaking as she has been described as the "quintessential transnational filmmaker". With her childhood and heritage informing her of key Indian and Hindu traditions, she has been seen to compare these practices with a more "Westernized" philosophy that has often resulted in controversy. The production of her film Water was delayed by protests from Hindu fundamentalists whilst several of her other films releases have seen boycotts across India, including the film Fire.

Mehta's Elements trilogy notably explores themes of the emergence of new identities, particularly in the context of independence. In Fire, the older character Radha's sense of agency and empowerment increases as she becomes sexually liberated through the younger character Sita. Professor Subeshini Moodley discusses how these women employ their bodies to cross boundaries & borders, stating how “their bodies being the marginal spaces that they occupy, these protagonists don’t always begin as women with agency, but grow and develop to that point. Their marginal spaces are first defined in order to show how they later redefine and transcend its boundaries”. Put otherwise, by allowing themselves to explore their sexuality with each other, these women are breaking free of the restrictive confines of the traditional female Indian archetype that used to define their value (such as traits of virtue & obedience), and instead are reclaiming their power by transgressing the boundaries of their culture.

Another way in which Fire exemplifies the emergence of modern female identities is through its deliberate defiance of patriarchal structures through religious & cultural symbolism. The protagonists’ names of Radha and Sita are direct references to the heroines of the traditional Hindu epic, Ramayana, in which the characters Radha and Sita represent contrasting elements of feminine virtue; Radha embodying the playful adventuress and Sita being the dutiful and dedicated wife. However, Mehta switches the defining characteristics of these characters for her film, making Radha the obedient matriarch and Sita the inquisitive newlywed. This is important to note when discussing a key scene in the film in which after Ashok learns of his wife’s affair with Sita, Radha’s sari catches fire from the kitchen stove and she nearly becomes engulfed in flames. This is a clear allusion to a sequence from the Ramayana in which Sita is forced to prove her purity for her husband Rama by walking through a fire. Dr. David Burton discusses how Mehta’s film subverts the traditional symbolism of the religious epic through its reversed meaning; in Fire, Radha survives the fire not to represent her purity for her husband, but rather to “assert her freedom from patriarchal control and traditional notions of sexual purity”, once again conveying how the film effectively depicts the inception of modernity in the female realm.

As previously mentioned, Mehta based Earth on Pakistani author Bapsi Sidwha's acclaimed 1988 novel Ice Candy Man, which employs a young Parsi girl from a wealthy family as its protagonist. Mehta's decision to maintain such a privileged protagonist is noteworthy; in one scene, Lenny’s mother attempts to explain to her daughter the role which Parsis play in the movement for India’s independence, in which she compares Parsis in India to sugar in milk: “sweet but invisible”. While this takes on a negative connotation within the film, in a larger historical context, Lenny’s observation further supports Mehta’s decision to have the film’s protagonist taken on by a figure of such religious, cultural and ethnic ambivalence. The main goal of Lenny’s wealthy Parsi family is to stay neutral during the political tensions of Partition, and her astute renouncement of her family’s invisibility only reinforces this. Furthermore, “the fact that Lenny is neither Hindu nor Muslim [frees] the narrative from a divisive communal dichotomy”. Lenny’s whole world is encompassed by her relationship with her Hindu nanny, her nanny’s adoration from two Muslim men, and their diverse friend group. When the conflict of Partition tears the group apart, Lenny’s whole world is simultaneously destroyed, and her humanist perspective allows for an unbiased portrayal of the negative effects which a fear of change and breaking tradition can inflict upon a society’s health.

Mehta's last film in the Elements trilogy, Water, showcases the gross oppression endured by Indian women during precolonial times. It also depicts the mistreatment of widows to present strong support for the breaking of traditional social norms and an embrace of contemporary identities for Indian women. One example of this can be seen through the Hindu male hegemony’s reliance upon the authority of Hindu scriptures to rationalize the mistreatment of widows. In Water, when Narayan’s father is revealed to be a former client of Kalyani, he attempts to justify his sexual exploits to his son by using his class privilege, stating that Brahmins can sleep with whomever they want as the women they sleep with are blessed. Narayan’s response that Brahmins who interpret the Holy Scripture for their own benefit should not be honored elucidates the immense hypocrisy which underlines various ancient religious ideologies that are often employed solely by the caste of men who seek to benefit from such outdated customs. Burton also points out how such selfish reworkings of religious ideologies is the real killer of faith, instead of Mehta’s sensational films. He states, “Reformers… who often view the negative aspects of their religion as misreading's and cultural accretions are themselves in danger of essentializing Hinduism insofar as they imply that the version of Hinduism of which they approve is the only genuine one”. In other words, the insistence to uphold such outdated structures of patriarchal hegemony simply on the basis of religiosity is in itself more blasphemous and sacrilegious than any sin outlined by ancient scriptures. However, there are certain elements of Water that allude to the positivity of embracing modernity. For example, Chaya's eventual rescue by Shakuntala and potentially happy future with Narayan presents the promise of Gandhi-influenced reform within Indian society.

Mehta often uses her films to explore the impacts of cultural and political unrest on the lives of normal citizens, stating, "A driving force in the stories I want to tell is definitely curiosity. I was intrigued by sectarian war. I’m appalled by it. I was immensely curious about how it affects the everywoman and everyman."

== Personal life ==
In India, she met and married filmmaker Paul Saltzman whom she divorced in 1983. The couple have a daughter, Devyani Saltzman, an author, curator and cultural critic.

Mehta is currently married to producer David Hamilton. Her brother, Dilip Mehta, is a photojournalist and film director. He directed Cooking with Stella, which he co-wrote with Deepa.

Mehta participated in a TV PSA for the charity Artists Against Racism, and is a member of the organization.

== Filmography ==
=== Documentary film ===
| Year | Title | Director | Writer | Producer | Notes |
|---|---|---|---|---|---|
| 1973 | St. Demetrius Rides a Red Horse | No | Narration | No | |
| 1986 | K.Y.T.E.S: How We Dream Ourselves | Yes | Yes | Yes | |
| 2006 | Let's Talk About It | Yes | No | No | Direct-to-video |
| 2008 | The Forgotten Woman | No | Yes | Executive | |
| 2016 | Mostly Sunny | No | Yes | No | |
| 2023 | I Am Sirat | Yes | No | No | Co-directed with Sirat Taneja |

Documentary shorts

| Year | Title | Director | Producer |
|---|---|---|---|
| 1975 | At 99: A Portrait of Louise Tandy Murch | Yes | No |
| 2016 | Fantassút | No | Yes |

=== Narrative film ===
| Year | Title | Director | Writer | Producer | Notes |
|---|---|---|---|---|---|
| 1973 | The Perlmutar Story | No | Yes | No | Short film |
| 1988 | Martha, Ruth and Edie | Yes | No | Yes | Anthology film co-directed with Norma Bailey and Danièle J. Suissa |
| 1991 | Sam & Me | Yes | No | Yes | |
| 1994 | Camilla | Yes | No | No | |
| 1996 | Fire | Yes | Yes | Yes | |
| 1998 | Earth | Yes | Yes | Yes | |
| 2002 | Bollywood/Hollywood | Yes | Yes | No | Also executive music producer |
| 2003 | The Republic of Love | Yes | Yes | No | |
| 2005 | Water | Yes | Yes | No | Also development consultant |
| 2008 | Heaven on Earth | Yes | Yes | Executive | |
| 2009 | Cooking with Stella | No | Yes | Executive | |
| 2012 | Midnight's Children | Yes | Yes | Executive | |
| 2015 | Beeba Boys | Yes | Yes | No | |
| 2016 | Anatomy of Violence | Yes | No | No | |
| 2020 | Violation | No | No | Executive | |
| 2020 | Funny Boy | Yes | Yes | No | |
| 2022 | Donkeyhead | No | No | Executive | |
| TBA | Sky | Yes | Yes | Yes | |

Upcoming films

- Troilokya (Thriller about policeman Priyanath Mukhopadhyay's decade-long pursuit of a prostitute turned serial killer in 19th century Calcutta. The screenplay is by Juhi Chaturvedi.)
- Forgiveness (Biographical drama about two families (one Japanese-Canadian) in post World War II Canada. Adapted by Mark Sakamoto from his memoir of the same name.)
- Sher (Comedy about Sherlock Holmes' Indian daughter, scripted by Johnny Gurzman.)

Film appearances

- Jurm (1990)
- Aashiqui (1990)
- Water (2005)

=== Television ===
| Year | Title | Director | Writer | Executive producer | Notes |
|---|---|---|---|---|---|
| 1976–1981 | Spread Your Wings | Yes | Yes | Yes | Documentary series: director (4 episodes); writer (Episode: "Child of the Andes"); executive producer (13 episodes); production (2 episodes); sound (10 episodes) |
| 1989–1990 | Danger Bay | Yes | No | No | 4 episodes |
| 1993–1996 | The Young Indiana Jones Chronicles | Yes | No | No | 2 episodes |
| 2019 | Leila | Yes | Yes | Creative | director (2 episodes); writer and creative executive producer (6 episodes) |
| 2020 | Little America | Yes | No | No | Episode "The Manager" |
| 2021 | Yellowjackets | Yes | No | No | Episode "Bear Down" |

Acting credits

| Year | Title | Role | Notes |
|---|---|---|---|
| 1983 | For the Record | Ranjeet Singh | Episode "Reasonable Force" |
| 1989 | Inside Stories | | Episode: "In Limbo" |

== Awards ==
| Year | Award | Category | Work | Result |
|---|---|---|---|---|
| 2016 | Toronto International Film Festival | Best Canadian Feature Film | Anatomy of Violence | Nominated |
| 2016 | Valladolid International Film Festival | Golden Spike – Best Film | Anatomy of Violence | Nominated |
| 2016 | Washington DC South Asian Film Festival | Outstanding Achievement in International Cinema | Anatomy of Violence | Won |
| 2015 | Toronto Film Critics Association Awards | Clyde Gilmour Award | | Won |
| 2015 | Toronto International Film Festival | Best Canadian Feature Film | Beeba Boys | Nominated |
| 2013 | Canadian Screen Awards | Achievement in Direction | Midnight's Children | Nominated |
| 2013 | Directors Guild of Canada | DGC Team Award – Feature Film | Midnight's Children | Won |
| 2012 | London Film Festival | Best Film | Midnight's Children | Nominated |
| 2012 | Valladolid International Film Festival | Golden Spike – Best Film | Midnight's Children | Nominated |
| 2009 | Directors Guild of Canada | DGC Team Award – Feature Film | Heaven on Earth | Nominated |
| 2009 | Genie Awards | Best Screenplay, Original | Heaven on Earth | Nominated |
| 2009 | Vancouver Film Critics Circle | Best Director – Canadian Film | Heaven on Earth | Nominated |
| 2008 | Dubai International Film Festival | Muhr AsiaAfrica Award: Best Scriptwriter – Feature | Heaven on Earth | Won |
| 2008 | Dubai International Film Festival | Muhr AsiaAfrica Award: Best Film – Feature | Heaven on Earth | Nominated |
| 2007 | Italian National Syndicate of Film Journalists | Silver Ribbon – Best Non-European Director | Water | Nominated |
| 2007 | Chlotrudis Awards | Best Director | Water | Nominated |
| 2007 | Awards of the International Indian Film Academy | Outstanding Achievement in International Cinema | | Won |
| 2006 | Genie Awards | Best Achievement in Direction | Water | Nominated |
| 2006 | Oslo Films from the South Festival | Silver Mirror Award – Best Feature | Water | Won |
| 2006 | New York Film Critics | Humanitarian Award | Water | Won |
| 2006 | San Francisco International Asian American Film Festival | Audience Award – Best Narrative Feature | Water | Won |
| 2006 | Taormina International Film Festival | Arte Award | Water | Won |
| 2006 | Vancouver Film Critics Circle | Best Director – Canadian Film | Water | Won |
| 2006 | Women Film Critics Circle Awards | Best Foreign Movie by or About Women | Water | Won |
| 2005 | Toronto Female Eye Film Festival | Honorary Director Award | | Won |
| 2005 | Valladolid International Film Festival | Youth Jury Award | Water | Won |
| 2005 | Valladolid International Film Festival | Golden Spike | Water | Nominated |
| 2003 | Directors Guild of Canada | DGC Team Award – Feature Film | Bollywood/Hollywood | Won |
| 2003 | Genie Awards | Best Screenplay, Original | Bollywood/Hollywood | Won |
| 2003 | Newport International Film Festival | Student Jury Award | Bollywood/Hollywood | Won |
| 2003 | Sarasota Film Festival | Audience Award – Best Comedy | Bollywood/Hollywood | Won |
| 2003 | Vancouver Film Critics Circle | Best Director – Canadian Film | Bollywood/Hollywood | Nominated |
| 1997 | Paris Lesbian and Feminist Film Festival | Best Feature Film | Fire | Won |
| 1997 | L.A. Outfest | Outstanding Narrative Feature | Fire | Won |
| 1997 | Verona Love Screens Film Festival | Best Film | Fire | Won |
| 1996 | Mannheim-Heidelberg International Filmfestival | Special Prize of the Jury | Fire | Won |
| 1996 | Mannheim-Heidelberg International Filmfestival | International Independent Award | Fire | Nominated |
| 1996 | Vancouver International Film Festival | Most Popular Canadian Film | Fire | Won |
| 1976 | Chicago International Film Festival | Gold Hugo – Best Documentary | At 99: A Portrait of Louise Tandy Murch | Nominated |

In addition to her filmmaking awards, Mehta has received the following honors:

- Doctor of Laws, University of Victoria, 2009
- Top 25 Canadian Immigrant Award Winner, 2009
- Governor General's Performing Arts Awards for Lifetime Artistic Achievement, 2012
- Doctor of Laws, Mount Allison University, 2013
- Doctor of Letters, Concordia University, 2013
- Member of the Order of Ontario, 2013
- Officer of the Order of Canada, 2013
- Head Juror: In 2021 she was selected as head juror for BIFF New Current Award in 26th Busan International Film Festival to be held in October.

== See also ==
- List of female film and television directors
- List of LGBT-related films directed by women
- South Asian Canadians in the Greater Toronto Area
- Women's cinema
