= Beeba Boys =

2015 Canadian crime film by Deepa Mehta

- Theatrical release poster
- Directed by: Deepa Mehta
- Written by: Deepa Mehta
- Produced by: David Hamilton
- Starring: Randeep Hooda
- Cinematography: Karim Hussain
- Edited by: Colin Monie
- Production company: Hamilton Mehta Productions
- Distributed by: Mongrel International
- Release dates: 13 September 2015 (TIFF); 16 October 2015 (Canada)
- Running time: 103 minutes
- Country: Canada
- Languages: English; Punjabi

Beeba Boys is a 2015 Canadian crime thriller film written and directed by Deepa Mehta. It stars Randeep Hooda as Jeet Johar, a loving single father, a dutiful son, a proud, observant Sikh and a ruthless gangster managing a team of stylish, charismatic but brutal and unforgiving young men. The film is a fictional take based on real incidents, including Bindy Johal.

== Plot ==
Jeet Johar is a ruthless Indo-Canadian gangster living in Vancouver, British Columbia. He and his gang take on the name of "Beeba" (which means good) Boys and dress in stylish, colourful suits. Jeet is irreverent, picking a feud with the much older Robbie Grewal, who deals in drugs and weapons. When his gang murders Lucky (and his girlfriend), a man who works for Grewal, for selling drugs on his turf, Jeet is arrested and forced to stand trial.

While in prison Jeet meets Nep, a failed wannabe kidnapper who ingratiates himself to Jeet by beating up some white supremacists. Jeet also becomes attracted to a blonde juror serving on his trial. He is eventually declared not guilty of the crime of Lucky's murder. Out of prison he introduces himself to Katya Drobot, the blonde juror, and installs her in a penthouse in a building he owns. He also has his crew contact Nep and tells him that in order to gain his favour he must do something to anger Grewal. Unsure of what to do, Nep contacts Grewal, for whom he is secretly working. Grewal suggests that Nep kidnap his own daughter, Choti. Choti goes along with the plan, allowing Nep to impress Jett and officially become a Beeba Boy. During that process, Choti and Nep develop a relationship.

Over time, Jeet becomes cocky and hijacks some of Grewal's merchandise, then attempts to kill Grewal. Nep, aware of the plan, is able to warn Grewal in time to save his life. However, this casts suspicion that there is a mole inside Jeet's roster. Manny, one of the Beeba Boys, takes Nep with him to shake down Jamie, a businessman working for Grewal. Jamie gives up Nep as the mole, but then shoots Manny and lights him on fire. As Jeet is trying to figure out how members of his gang keep being murdered, Katya inadvertently reveals that Nep was with Manny when he died. Jeet takes Nep for a drive, intending to kill him, but they are pulled over by the police and Nep takes the blame for Jeet's illegal gun.

More and more men from Jeet's organization are murdered, for which they retaliate by killing more of Grewal's men. Grewal sends thugs to Katya's apartment, hoping to catch Jeet unaware; Jett is not there, so they murder Katya. Unsure of what to do, Jeet listens to his mother's suggestion that perhaps it would be best for the family to return to India.

Before going Jeet asks Nep to meet him at a nightclub. The two have a conversation, where Nep reveals that he is part of an undercover sting operation to take down Grewal, until Grewal unknowingly the Beeba Boys. Nep tells Jeet that he has wire taps of Jeet talking about his crimes, but no recordings of Grewal ordering him to kill Jeet as he uses intermediaries.

Loud gunshots are heard in the club and everyone flees. Nep runs to Grewal's waiting car, surprised to find Choti present, and tells Grewal that he has killed Jeet. Grewal tells the wired Nep why he ordered Jeet killed, then shoots Nep (with Choti preventing Nep's death by moving her father's arm down) and pushes him out of his car. As Grewal stops to avoid a bystander, Jeet jumps in, revealing that Nep never shot him. He tells Grewal that Nep was an undercover cop and the best they can do is to turn themselves in. Surrounded by the police, Grewal allows Jeet and Choti to exit the car to surrender themselves. However, he exits the car and shoots Jeet dead, and is himself killed by the police.

== Cast ==
- Randeep Hooda as Jeet Johar
- Ali Momen as Nep
- Sarah Allen as Katya Drobot
- Paul Gross as Jamie
- Ali Kazmi as Guri
- Dileep Rao as Kash Sood
- Steve Dhillon as Harry
- Waris Ahluwalia as Manny
- Jag Bal as Jazz
- Gabe Grey as Lovely
- Balinder Johal as Mrs. Johar (Mummyji)
- Kulbushan Kharbanda as Mr. Johar (Papaji)
- Gia Sandhu as Choti Grewal
- Monika Deol as Mrs. Pinky Grewal
- Samir Amarshi as Peter Johar
- Gulshan Grover as Robbie Grewal

== Release ==
Beeba Boys premiered at the 2015 Toronto International Film Festival. The first trailer was released on 29 July 2015 as part of the TIFF festival marketing.

The film was released in theatres on 16 October 2015.

== Reception ==
On review aggregator Rotten Tomatoes, the film has a 33% approval rating, with an average rating of 5.14/10 based on 12 reviews.

The Globe and Mail gave a negative review of the film, noting its "great premise... repeatedly dragged down by the director, her script and her cast."

The South Asian Post, an Indo-Canadian weekly based in Vancouver, published a scathing review of the film stating that the filmmaker tries "to get all the ingredients into this recipe: gangster threatening rival, gangster going to jail, gangster in court, gangster courting his moll, all stirred together with a couple of cultural scenes, and voila the souffle. Unfortunately, the pieces do not sum to a whole greater than its parts."
