= Pact =

Pact, The Pact or PACT may refer to:

== Entertainment ==
- The Pact (novel), by Jodi Picoult, 1998
- The Pact (2002 film), adaptation of Picoult's The Pact
- The Pact (2003 film), Australian film
- The Pact (2006 film), American documentary
- The Pact (2012 film), American horror film
- The Pact (2018 Spanish film), Spanish horror thriller film
- The Pact (Polish TV series), American title for Polish series Pakt
- The Pact (British TV series), Welsh drama series
- The Pact (Qatari TV series), Qatari sci-fi series that aired in 2022
- "The Pact" (The Amazing World of Gumball), a television episode
- The Pact, former title of 2018 American comedy film Blockers
- The Pact (comics), a production of Image Comics
- The Pact (2002 book), a 2002 non-fiction book by The Three Doctors

== Organizations ==
- Parents and Abducted Children Together, UK charity dealing with international child abduction
- Party for Accountability, Competency and Transparency, Canadian political party
- Pickleball Association of the Australian Capital Territory
- Pratigya Apprenticeship for Community Transformation, an Indian residential program for tribal youth
- Prison Advice and Care Trust, UK charity supporting prisoners and their families
- Producers Alliance for Cinema and Television, UK media trade association
- Protecting American Communities Task Force, group of federal agents established in 2020 by the U.S. Department of Homeland Security
- PACT (Protestant Adoption Society), an Irish adoption organisation

== Places ==
- Pact, Isère, a commune in France
- Puppetry Art Center of Taipei, an art center in Taipei, Taiwan

== Science and technology ==
- PACT (compiler), a series of compilers for the IBM 701 and 704 computers
- Photodynamic Antimicrobial Chemotherapy, an alternative name for Antimicrobial Photodynamic Therapy
- Protein ACTivator of the interferon-induced protein kinase, a protein encoded by the PRKRA gene
- Powdered activated carbon treatment, a waste water treatment technology
- Programme of Action for Cancer Therapy, an IAEA project on radiation medicine
- Positioning Advertising Copy Testing, a document detailing features of a Good Copy Testing System
- PACT (interaction design), a structure used to analyse user interfaces

== See also ==
- Blood Pact (disambiguation)
- Compact (disambiguation)
- Contract
- Covenant (historical)
- Deal with the Devil
- Gentlemen's agreement
- Military alliance
- PACT Act (disambiguation)
- Pakt (disambiguation)
- Suicide pact
- Trade pact
- Treaty
- Truce
- , Including many titles "Pact of ..."
- , Including many titles "The ... Pact"
