= 8th Filmfare Awards Bangla =

Indian film awards

- Presented on: 18 March 2025
- Site: JW Marriott Hotel, Kolkata
- Hosted by: Puja Banerjee; Raj Chakraborty; Shiboprosad Mukherjee
- Organized by: The Times Group
- Official website: Joy Filmfare Awards Bangla 2025

Highlights
- Best Film: Bohurupi
- Best Director: Nandita Roy & Shiboprosad Mukherjee for Bohurupi
- Best Actor: Shiboprosad Mukherjee for Bohurupi
- Best Actress: Subhashree Ganguly for Babli
- Best Critic: Chaalchitra Ekhon; Manikbabur Megh
- Most awards: Bohurupi (7)
- Most nominations: Bohurupi (16)

Television coverage
- Network: Zee Bangla

The 8th Filmfare Awards Bangla is an award ceremony, presented by The Times Group, which honoured the best Indian Bengali-language films of 2024.

Bohurupi, directed by the duo Nandita Roy and Shiboprosad Mukherjee, led the ceremony with a leading sixteen nominations, including Best Film, Best Director, Best Actor (for Shiboprosad Mukherjee), Best Actress (for Koushani Mukherjee) and Best Supporting Actress (for Ritabhari Chakraborty), ultimately emerging as the most awarded film with seven wins. It was followed by Chaalchitro: The Frame Fatale and Padatik, with both receiving fourteen nominations each.

Subhashree Ganguly received her second Best Actress award for Babli, besides receiving two additional nominations for Best Actress (Critics) and Best Supporting Actress. The ceremony was aired on 30 March 2025 on Zee Bangla.

== Ceremony ==
Held at the JW Marriott Hotel, Kolkata on 18 March 2025, the Joy Filmfare Awards Bangla 2025 honoured the best Indian Bengali-language films released in 2024. A press conference was held on 10 March 2025 at Kolkata, where Jitesh Pillai, the editor of Filmfare, declared Joy to be the title sponsor, while also announcing the nominations for the ceremony.

Co-founder Sunil Aggarwal and Chief Marketing Officer Poulomi Roy were present as the representatives from Joy. Subhashree Ganguly was present at the conference. Puja Banerjee, Raj Chakraborty and Shiboprosad Mukherjee were announced to be the hosts, while the list of performers included Barkha Bisht Sengupta and Subhashree Ganguly amongst others.

== Winners and nominees ==
The nominations were announced on 10 March 2025.

=== Popular awards ===
Best Film		Best Director
Bohurupi – Windows Production; Ajogyo – Surinder Films; Chaalchitro: The Frame Fatale – Friends Communication; Khadaan – Surinder Films & Dev Entertainment Ventures; Padatik – Friends Communication; Shontaan – SVF		Nandita Roy & Shiboprosad Mukherjee – Bohurupi; Kaushik Ganguly – Ajogyo; Pratim D Gupta – Chaalchitro: The Frame Fatale; Raj Chakraborty – Babli; Soojit Rino Dutta – Khadaan; Srijit Mukherji – Padatik
Best Actor		Best Actress
Shiboprosad Mukherjee – Bohurupi as Bikram Pramanik / Chuni Kumar / Bablu Sarkar / Eklas Chaudhury; Ankush Hazra – Mirza: Part 1 – Joker as Mirza Sheikh; Dev – Khadaan as Shyam Mahato / Madhu Mahato; Mithun Chakraborty – Shontaan as Saradindu Bose; Prosenjit Chatterjee – Ajogyo as Prosen Mitra; Tota Roy Chowdhury – Chaalchitro: The Frame Fatale as Kanishka Chatterjee; Vikram Chatterjee – Pariah as Lubdhak Chatterjee		Subhashree Ganguly – Babli as Babli (Damayanti); Aparajita Adhya – Eta Amader Golpo as Shritama Dutta Sharma; Jaya Ahsan – Bhootpori as Banalata; Koushani Mukherjee – Bohurupi as Jhimli Pramanik; Oindrila Sen – Mirza: Part 1 – Joker as SI Muskaan; Rituparna Sengupta – Ajogyo as Parna Majumdar
Best Supporting Actor		Best Supporting Actress
Sawon Chakraborty – Chaalchitra Ekhon as Ranjan Dutt; Silajit Majumdar – Ajogyo as Raktim Majumdar; Amit Saha – Mon Potongo as Bapon; Anirban Chakrabarti – Chaalchitro: The Frame Fatale as Naseer; Jisshu Sengupta – Khadaan as Mohan Das; Soumya Mukherjee – Pariah as Nanda		Monami Ghosh – Padatik as Geeta Sen; Tanika Basu – Chaalchitro: The Frame Fatale as Putul; Ritabhari Chakraborty – Bohurupi as Pori Ghoshal; Subhashree Ganguly – Shontaan as Adv. Indrani Sen; Swastika Dutta – Alaap as Swatilekha Sen; Swastika Mukherjee – Bijoyar Pore as Mrinmoyee 'Meenu' Mizanoor
Debut awards
Best Male Debut	Best Female Debut	Best Debut Director
Subhankar Mohanta – Mon Potongo as Haasan; Gambhira Bhattacharya – Hubba as Shyamal 'Hubba' Mondal; Indrajeet Bose – Chaalchitro: The Frame Fatale ACP Bishwa; Korak Samanta – Padatik as Mrinal Sen; Pratik Dutta – Shri Swapankumarer Badami Hyenar Kobole as Ratan Lal	Baishakhi Roy – Mon Potongo as Laxmi; Idhika Paul – Khadaan as Latika Mahato; Angana Roy – Pariah as Kamalini; Roshni Bhattacharya – Oti Uttam as Sohini	Samik Roy Chowdhury – Beline; Abhijit Sridas – Bijoyar Pore; Abhinandan Banerjee – Manikbabur Megh; Arna Mukhopadhyay – Athhoi; Manasi Sinha – Eta Amader Golpo; Soojit Rino Dutta – Khadaan
Writing awards
Best Original Story	Best Screenplay	Best Dialogues
Abhinandan Banerjee – Manikbabur Megh; Nandita Roy & Shiboprosad Mukherjee – Bohurupi; Pratim D Gupta – Chaalchitro: The Frame Fatale; Rajdeep Paul & Sarmistha Maiti – Mon Potongo; Samik Roy Choudhury – Beline; Sreejib & Soumyabrata Rakshit – Shontaan	Srijit Mukherji – Padatik; Abhinandan Banerjee – Manikbabur Megh; Antara Banerjee & Tathagata Mukherjee – Pariah; Aritra Banerjee – Dabaru; Debaloy Bhattacharya – Shri Swapankumarer Badami Hyenar Kobole; Pratim D Gupta – Chaalchitro: The Frame Fatale	Kaushik Ganguly – Ajogyo; Abhinandan Banerjee & Bauddhayan Mukherji – Manikbabur Megh; Pratim D Gupta – Chaalchitro: The Frame Fatale; Premendu Bikash Chaki & Padmanabha Dasgupta – Alaap; Srijit Mukherji – Padatik
Music awards
Best Music Album		Best Lyrics
Anupam Roy, Bonnie Chakraborty, Arnab Dutta, Silajit Majumdar & Nanichora Das Baul – Bohurupi; Anupam Roy – Alaap; Anupam Roy, Indraadip Dasgupta & Ranajoy Bhattacharjee – Ajogyo; Savvy Gupta, Rathijit Bhattacharjee & Nilayan Chatterjee – Khadaan; Loy–Deep – Surjo		Abhinandan Banerjee – "Tomar Amar Golpo Hoto Jodi" – Manikbabur Megh; Anupam Roy – "Ajogyo Ami" – Ajogyo; Nanichora Das Baul – "Shimul Polash" – Bohurupi; Prasen – "Megh Muluker Jhil" – Surjo; Ranajoy Bhattacharjee – "Tomay Chhere Jete Parlam Koi" – Tekka; Ranajoy Bhattacharjee – "Tui Amar Hobi Na" – Ajogyo
Best Playback Singer - Male		Best Playback Singer - Female
Nanichora Das Baul & Bonnie Chakraborty – "Shimul Polash" – Bohurupi; Anirban Bhattacharya – "Tomar Amar Golpo Hoto Jodi" – Manikbabur Megh; Arijit Singh – "Keu Janbe Na" – Ajogyo; Mika Singh – "Ki Ekkhan Gaan Banaise" – Sentimentaal; Rathijit Bhattacharjee – "Kishori" – Khadaan; Rupankar Bagchi – "Tui Amar Hobi Na" – Ajogyo; Timir Biswas – "Taasher Deshe" – Tekka		Shrestha Das – "Dakatiya Banshi" – Bohurupi; Antara Mitra – "Kishori" – Khadaan; Iman Chakraborty – "Ki Ekkhan Gaan Banaise" – Sentimentaal; Shreya Ghoshal – "Aj Shara Bela" – Bohurupi; Shreya Ghoshal – "Tui Amar Hobi Na" – Ajogyo; Somlata Acharyya Chowdhury – "Abohawa Bole Dey" – Alaap

=== Critics awards ===
Best Film (Best Director)
Chaalchitra Ekhon – Anjan Dutt; Manikbabur Megh – Abhinandan Banerjee; Beline – Samik Roy Choudhury; Mon Potongo – Rajdeep Paul & Sarmistha Maiti; Padatik – Srijit Mukherji; Shri Swapankumarer Badami Hyenar Kobole – Debaloy Bhattacharya
Best Actor	Best Actress
Anjan Dutt – Chaalchitra Ekhon as Kunal Sen; Chandan Sen – Manikbabur Megh as Manik Babu; Abir Chatterjee – Shri Swapankumarer Badami Hyenar Kobole as Dipak Chatterjee; Chanchal Chowdhury – Padatik as Mrinal Sen; Mosharraf Karim – Hubba as Shyamal Mondal / Hubba Shyamal; Paran Bandopadhyay – Beline as Unnamed Old Man	Mamata Shankar – Bijoyar Pore as Alokananda 'Aloka'; Anashua Majumdar – Shontaan as Mala Bose; Baishakhi Roy – Mon Potongo as Laxmi; Mimi Chakraborty – Alaap as Aditi Mitra (AM); Sreya Bhattacharya – Beline as The Unnamed Girl; Subhashree Ganguly – Babli as Babli (Damayanti)

=== Technical awards ===
Best Cinematography	Best Production Design	Best Editing
Anup Singh – Manikbabur Megh; Indranath Marick - Padatik; Indranath Marick - Bohurupi; Manas Ganguly - Babli; Ramyadeep Saha - Shri Swapankumarer Badami Hyenar Kobole; Turja Ghosh - Chaalchitro: The Frame Fatale	Tanmay Chakraborty – Padatik; Ananda Adhyya - Bohurupi; Ananda Adhyya - Chaalchitro: The Frame Fatale; Monalisa Mukherji - Manikbabur Megh; Ranajit Gharai - Shri Swapankumarer Badami Hyenar Kobole; Bablu Singha - Khadaan	Srijit Mukherji – Padatik; Antara Lahiri - Chaalchitro: The Frame Fatale; Malay Laha - Bohurupi; MD. Kalam - Dabaru; Pronoy Dasgupta - Oti Uttam; Sanglap Bhowmik - Shri Swapankumarer Badami Hyenar Kobole
Best Background Score	Best Sound Design	Best Costume
Neel Dutt – Chaalchitra Ekhon; Bonnie Chakraborty - Bohurupi; Debojyoti Mishra - Chaalchitro: The Frame Fatale; Indraadip Dasgupta - Padatik; Prabuddha Banerjee - Alaap; Rathijit Bhattacharjee - Khadaan; Subhajit Mukherjee - Manikbabur Megh	Abhijit (Tenny) Roy – Manikbabur Megh; Adeep Singh Manki - Athhoi; Anindit Roy and Adeep Singh Manki - Khadaan; Anindit Roy and Adeep Singh Manki - Chaalchitro: The Frame Fatale; Dibyo - Padatik	Jayanti Sen – Bohurupi; Sabarni Das - Shri Swapankumarer Badami Hyenar Kobole; Poulami Gupta - Jamalaye Jibonto Bhanu; Sabarni Das - Padatik; Sabarni Das - Hubba

== Lifetime Achievement Award ==
Lifetime Achievement Award
- Biswajit Chatterjee

== Superlatives ==
Multiple nominations
Nominations	Film
16	Bohurupi
14	Chaalchitro: The Frame Fatale
14	Padatik
12	Khadaan
12	Manikbabur Megh
10	Ajogyo
8	Shri Swapankumarer Badami Hyenar Kobole
6	Alaap
6	Mon Potongo
5	Shontaan
4	Chaalchitra Ekhon
4	Babli
4	Pariah
3	Hubba
3	Beline
3	Bijoyar Pore

Multiple wins
Awards	Film
7	Bohurupi
6	Manikbabur Megh
4	Padatik
4	Chaalchitra Ekhon
2	Ajogyo
2	Mon Potongo
