= Jadoo Teri Nazar =

Marathi play

- Written by: Ratnakar Matkari
- Original language: Marathi
- Genre: Romantic comedy musical

Premiere
- Place premiered: India

Jadoo Teri Nazar is a Marathi play directed by Mangesh Kadam and written by Ratnakar Matkari. The star cast includes Prashant Damle, Manisha Joshi, Shalaka Pawar, Satish Tare.

The play is a romantic comedy musical.

== Synopsis ==
An eye specialist Dr. Pundalik usually counsels his students along with the assistance of Prakash. He is a bachelor who shares a bittersweet relationship with his friend Dr. Purva who happens to be his competition next to his clinic.

One day, someone sells Dr. Pundalik a potion which if used as an eye drop will fall in love with the first person he sets his sight on. Hence begins a hilarious ride of musical journey.

== Cast ==
- Prashant Damle
- Sandeep Pathak
- Shalaka Pawar
- Shyam Ponkshe
- Manisha Joshi
- Satish Tare
- Astad Kale
- Vijay Mishra

== Crew ==
- Producer - Sudhir Bhat
- Director - Mangesh Kadam
- Writer - Ratnakar Matkari
- Music Director - Ashok Patki
