= Tu Bol Na =

2025 Indian film by Mrunmayee Deshpande

- Mana Che Shlok
- Directed by: Mrunmayee Deshpande
- Written by: Mrunmayee Deshpande
- Produced by: Nitin Prakash Vaidya; Sanjay Dawra; Shreyash Jadhav
- Starring: Mrunmayee Deshpande; Rahul Pethe
- Cinematography: Abhijit D. Abde
- Edited by: Pravin Jahagirdar
- Music by: Siddharth Mahadevan; Soumil Shringarpure
- Production companies: Starlight Box Theatres; Ganraj Studios; Sanjay Dawara Experiences; Nitin Vaidya Productions
- Distributed by: Panorama Studios
- Release date: 10 October 2025
- Running time: 123 minutes
- Country: India
- Language: Marathi

Tu Bol Na (transl. You Speak Up) is a 2025 Indian Marathi-language romantic comedy-drama film written and directed by Mrunmayee Deshpande. The film stars Deshpande as Manava and Rahul Pethe as Shlok, supported by Pushkaraj Chirputkar, Karan Parab, Shubhangi Gokhale and Leena Bhagwat. Produced by Nitin Prakash Vaidya, Sanjay Dawra, and Shreyash Jadhav, with music by Siddharth Mahadevan and Soumil Shringarpure, and distributed by Panorama Studios. The film explores modern relationships, marriage expectations, and the tension between individual freedom and social tradition, distinguished by a Broadway-influenced theatrical style.

The film was originally titled Mana Che Shlok and was released on 10 October 2025. However, protests by religious organisations, who objected that the title resembled the sacred Marathi devotional text Manache Shlok by Samarth Ramdas Swami, led to disruptions in screenings and the removal of theatre banners in Pune. In response, the filmmakers voluntarily changed the title, and the film was re-released as Tu Bol Na on 16 October 2025.

== Plot ==
Manava is an independent woman who loves trekking and holds deep reservations about the institution of marriage. Shlok is a thoughtful young man whose family has been seeking a suitable bride for him. When the two families arrange a meeting for the prospective couple, Manava deliberately behaves in an objectionable manner to discourage the match.

Shlok later learns that Manava had intentionally misbehaved during their first meeting. As they spend more time together, a genuine connection begins to form. Their relationship is complicated by a misunderstanding that threatens to separate them just as both families start to see them as a compatible pair. Both leads share not just a reluctance toward large ceremonial weddings, but deeper ambitions about living life on their own terms, away from urban pressures. The narrative challenges the notion that marriage must conform to social expectations, asking what an honest, modern partnership could look like.

== Cast ==
- Mrunmayee Deshpande as Manava
- Rahul Pethe as Shlok
- Pushkaraj Chirputkar as Hrishikesh
- Karan Parab as Abhishek
- Uday Tikekar as Shlok's father
- Shubhangi Gokhale as Shlok's mother
- Mangesh Kadam as Manava's father
- Leena Bhagwat as Manava's mother
- Suvrat Joshi as Honaji
- Siddharth Menon as Anna
- Harish Dudhade as Nana
- Malhar Limaye as Mihir
- Sayali Sanjeev as Radha
- Gautami Deshpande as Madhavi

== Production ==
Tu Bol Na marks the second directorial venture of Mrunmayee Deshpande, following Mann Fakiraa (2020), which also explored themes of arranged marriage in a contemporary Marathi context. The film also marked the first on-screen collaboration of real-life couple Mangesh Kadam and Leena Bhagwat. Additionally, sisters Mrunmayee Deshpande and Gautami Deshpande worked together on the project.

Principal photography took place in Pune, as well as in the mountainous regions of Himachal Pradesh at an altitude of approximately 12,500 feet. The film was among the first Marathi productions to resume and complete shooting after the COVID-19 pandemic in India.

== Soundtrack ==
The soundtrack was composed by Siddharth Mahadevan and Soumil Shringarpure.

No.	Title	Lyrics	Singer(s)	Length
1.	"Tu Bol Na"	Gautami Deshpande	Tushar Joshi	2:38
2.	"Hayya Ho"	Prajakt Deshmukh	Suvrat Joshi, Siddharth Menon, Harish Dudhade	2:41
3.	"Zoom Kar"	Prajakt Deshmukh	Suvrat Joshi, Siddharth Menon, Harish Dudhade	3:01
4.	"Uttar Kay"	Prajakt Deshmukh	Suvrat Joshi, Siddharth Menon, Harish Dudhade	3:15
Total length:				11:35

== Release ==
The film was released on 10 October 2025 under the title Mana Che Shlok. However, in the days leading up to the release, the Hindu Janajagruti Samiti and other religious organisations raised objections, stating that the title resembled Manache Shlok, a revered devotional text by the 17th-century saint Samarth Ramdas Swami. They argued that using a spiritually significant title for a commercial romance film was disrespectful to religious sentiments.

Protests subsequently spread across parts of Pune and other regions of Maharashtra. Promotional banners were removed, and several screenings in Pune were disrupted. Protesters demanded a title change as a condition for allowing the film's exhibition.

The Bombay High Court later permitted the film's screening. Despite receiving legal clearance, the filmmakers chose to avoid further conflict and announced a title change on 15 October 2025, renaming the film Tu Bol Na (transl. You Speak Up). The film was subsequently re-released under the new title on 16 October 2025.

Several commentators observed that the film itself contained no religious references and that the original title was intended as a philosophical metaphor related to the human mind rather than a direct reference to the sacred text. Nevertheless, the filmmakers opted for a resolution that prioritised public sentiment over prolonged legal proceedings.

== Reception ==
Kalpeshraj Kubal of Maharashtra Times gave the film a rating of 3 out of 5 stars and wrote, "Deshpande's experimental vision as a director is visible in this. Her style of presenting sensitive topics in a light and artistic way is revealed in this film."
