= Soor Rahu De =

Marathi play

- Original language: Marathi
- Written by: Sha. Na. Navre
- Genre: Drama

Premiere
- Place: India

Soor Rahu De is a Marathi play directed by Mohan Jawade and Mangesh Kadam and written by Sha. Na. Navre. The star cast includes Sunil Barve, Shubhangi Gokhale, Kshitij Jharapkar, Sanjay Mone, and Shruti Pandya.

The play is an emotional drama with a social message.

== Synopsis ==
A doctor and his wife have been living in his native place for close to five years while their son is studying in a boarding school up in Pune.

The doctor was born in an affluent family hence money was never a concerning factor. He practiced in Mumbai for two years before he made a decision to go to his native place for its development. His wife was not on the same page in regards to this decision.

The twist in the tale arises when one day a sales executive from a tractor firm arrives at the village and turns out to be the doctor's wife's ex-lover.

== Cast ==
- Sunil Barve
- Shubhangi Gokhale
- Kshitij Jharapkar
- Sanjay Mone
- Shruti Pandya

== Crew ==
- Director - Mohan Jawade and Mangesh Kadam
- Director - Sha. Na. Navre
