= Shubhangi Gokhale =

Indian actress (born 1968)

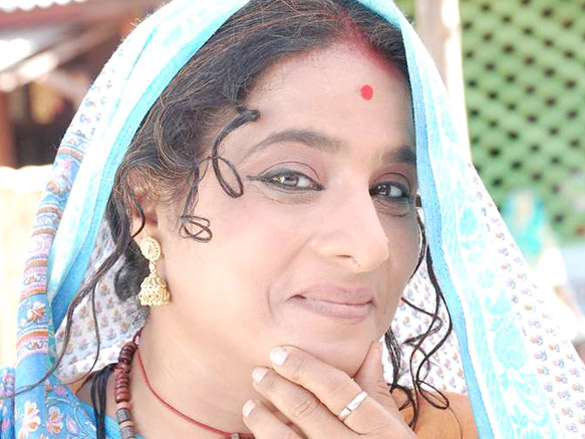
- Shubangi Gokhale in Lapataganj
- Born: 2 June 1968 (age 58); Khamgaon, Buldhana, Maharashtra
- Occupation: Actress
- Spouse: Mohan Gokhale (m. 1989; died 1999)
- Children: Sakhi Gokhale

Shubhangi Gokhale (born 2 June 1968) is an Indian Marathi and Hindi theatre, film and television actress. She was married to the late Hindi/Marathi actor Mohan Gokhale who played the title role on the Doordarshan show Mr Yogi. She has completed more than 300 shows of the popular play Sakhar Khallela Manus along with Prashant Damle, and has had roles in film and television. She is currently playing the role of Kusumavati Dhale-Patil in Colors Marathi's Raja Ranichi Ga Jodi and Shaku Khanwilkar in Zee Marathi's Yeu Kashi Tashi Me Nandayla.

== Early life and career ==
Shubhangi Gokhale was born in Khamgaon as Shubhangi Sangwai. Her father was a district judge while her mother was a housewife. Because her father's job required him to move around, the family relocated several times and lived in Jalna, Malkapur, Buldhana and several other districts in Maharashtra. She did her schooling at various locations and was interested in reading books and participated in debates and other competitions at the school level. She took part in a play while she was attending a government college in Aurangabad. Besides being an actor, she is also a writer and has written a number of short stories and articles. Her best known roles were as Mishri Mausi in Lapataganj and as Shyamla in Shriyut Gangadhar Tipre. In her 2018 play, Sakhar Khallela Manus, she acted with Prashant Damle.

== Personal life ==
Shubangi was married to Mohan Gokhale until his death in 1999. Together, they acted in a television miniseries Mr. Yogi. She took a break of around ten years from television and theatre after her marriage. After her husband's death, she made a comeback with the television serial Shriyut Gangadhar Tipre. She has one daughter, Sakhi Gokhale who is also an actress.

== Selected filmography ==
=== Films ===
Year	Title	Role
2000	Hey Ram	Rani
2001	Moksha : Salvation	
2004	Aga Bai Arrecha!	Mrs. Benare
2009	Bokya Satbande	Vaishali Satbande
2009	Kon Aahe Re Tikade	
2009	Sa Sasucha	Kartik's mother
2010	Zenda	Santosh's mother
2010	Kshanbhar Vishranti	Jiji
2018	Dassehra	Rudra's mother
2021	Karkhanisanchi Waari	Indira Karkhanis
2021	Basta	Swati's mother
2023	Baap Manus	
2024	Lek Asavi Tar Ashi	
2024	Gharat Ganpati	Kusum
2025	Tu Bol Na	Shlok's mother
2026	Sakhe Ga Saajani	Namrata's Mother

=== Television ===
Year	Title	Role	Channel
1989	Mr. Yogi	Yogesh's wife	Doordarshan
2000	Koshish – Ek Aashaa	Kajal's mother	Zee TV
2001-2004	Shriyut Gangadhar Tipre	Shyamala Tipre	Alpha TV Marathi
2009-2010	Agnihotra	Rohini Vinayak Agnihotri / Rohini Sadanand Rao	Star Pravah
2009-2014	Lapataganj	Mishri Mausi	Sony Sab
2011-2017	Chidiya Ghar	Murgeshwari Devi	Sony Sab
2013-2014	Eka Lagnachi Tisri Goshta	Shobhana Chaudhari	Zee Marathi
2014-2015	Hum Hain Na	Laxmi (Ammaji) Mishra	Sony Entertainment Television
2016-2017	Kahe Diya Pardes	Sarita Sawant	Zee Marathi
2018	Beechwale – Bapu Dekh Raha Hai	Rita	Sony Sab
2019-2022	Raja Ranichi Ga Jodi	Kusumavati Dhale-Patil	Colors Marathi
2021	Yeu Kashi Tashi Me Nandayla	Shakuntala (Shaku) Khanvilkar	Zee Marathi
2022	Bus Bai Bas	Guest	Zee Marathi
2022	Maddam Sir	Cheetah's aunt	Sony Sab
2023-2025	Premachi Gosht	Madhavi Gokhale	Star Pravah
2026	Hey Kay Navin?	Rama's Mother	

=== Plays ===
- Soor Rahu De
- Sakhar Khallela Manus
- Asena Me Nasena Me
