= Majha Hoshil Na =

Indian television series

- Genre: Drama; Romance
- Written by: Abhishek Khankar
- Screenplay by: Subodh Khanolkar
- Directed by: Aniket Sane
- Starring: See below
- Theme music composer: Ashok Patki
- Opening theme: "Majha Hoshil Na" by Aarya Ambekar
- Country of origin: India
- Original language: Marathi
- No. of episodes: 383

Production
- Producers: Subodh Khanolkar; Onkar Kate; Sujay Hande
- Camera setup: Multi-camera
- Running time: 22 minutes
- Production company: Ocean Films Company

Original release
- Network: Zee Marathi
- Release: 2 March 2020 – 28 August 2021

Majha Hoshil Na (transl. Will You Be Mine?) is an Indian Marathi language television series which aired on Zee Marathi. It starred Gautami Deshpande and Virajas Kulkarni in lead roles. It is produced by Subodh Khanolkar, Onkar Kate and Sujay Hande under the banner of Ocean film company and directed by Aniket Sane. It premiered from 2 March 2020 by replacing Swarajyarakshak Sambhaji.

== Plot ==
Sai and Nayana get stuck due to Appa's forgetfulness. Sai's words leave Aditya annoyed. Feeling insulted over her father. Sai drives rashly and gets into an accident due to Misunderstanding Aditya sees Sai and insults her. Sai tells Pintya Mama to get Aditya to apologize to her. On returning home, Aditya learns that all his uncles are angry. Further, he comes up with a plan to appease them. On being asked by Sai, Nayana calls Aditya. Later, their conversation makes Sai furious, as Nayana's keep calling, all the uncles question Aditya about it. To hide Aditya's real identity from him, his uncles keep Aditya at home and go to Aditya Group of Company along with Appa. Later, Sai is worried as her car is not at the garage. Aditya goes to return Sai's car and Shashikant (Sai's father) insults him, but Aditya rebukes him. Aditya's uncles and Appa find a scam in the finances of Aditya Group of Company and shout at Malhotra over it. Learning about Aditya's behaviour from Shashikant, Sai calls Aditya.

After few days, Sai and Aditya becomes friend. Sai tells Aditya about her designated spot at the hotel. Seeing Aditya's handkerchief in Nayana's bag, Sai questions her and Nayana tells Sai about her feelings about Aditya. Later, looking at the hotel bill, Aditya gets worried. Aditya gets anxious seeing the various things ordered by Sai at the hotel. Aditya's uncle waits for Aditya to come back and calls him. Sai tells Aditya, who is in a bit of hurry, to drop Nayana home.

As it is Aditya's first day at work, all his uncles give him blessings and Dada Mama gives him a gift. Pintya Mama drops Aditya at office from his car. Later, Sai and Nayana comes to meet Aditya. On seeing the gift given by Nayana, Aditya gets in trouble. Everyone at the house is happy as it Aditya's first day of the job. Sai's parents get worried, when they see Aditya's message on Sai's phone. While Pintya Mama is accusing Dada Mama, Aditya comes there. Aditya feels restless as he doesn't receive Sai's message on his first day of work. Nayana brings a lot of gifts for him. Later, Sai and Aditya talk about their situation at home and make fun of it. To teach Aditya a lesson, Malhotra decides to make him work in the warehouse.

After few days, Sharmila (Sai's mother) is all excited as she expects a family for Sai's bride seeing ceremony, but Sai makes an excuse and leaves the house. She meets Aditya, who teaches her to ride a bicycle. When Suyash the prospective groom and his family reach Sai's house, Sharmila tries to cover up for Sai's absence. Sharmila rebukes Sai on seeing her state because she is not in a Make-up look. Sai refuses to meet the Suyash, invited by Sharmila, Aditya gets a solution for Sai's problem. He gets mesmerised on seeing a photograph sent by Sai. Later, Suyash gets angry on hearing the question put forth by Sai. Aditya challenges Sai to come to learn how to ride the bicycle. Dada Mama tells Aditya to go and meet the girl. Sai and Aditya lie and leave their house, but Sai's father follows her and Bhai Mama follows Aditya. When Aditya and Sai see her father, then they stand apart from each other. As Sai's father speaks rudely to Aditya, his uncles get furious. Later, Sai and Aditya are worried as they have to meet with their prospective brides and grooms.

After few days, Aditya and Sai meet outside the hotel and convey their feelings. Sai gets furious as her parents fix her wedding with Suyash without her permission. Aditya's uncles tells him to say yes for his wedding. Later, Aditya consoles Sai. Sharmila tries to emotionally blackmail Sai, but they end up arguing. Sharmila calls Aditya and warns him to stay away from Sai. Aditya lashes out at Sai which sows a seed of doubt in her mind. Later, Aditya's uncles subtly try to convince Sai to marry Aditya. Meanwhile, Dada Mama fixes Aditya's marriage with Meghna on being pestered by Bandhu Mama, Aditya finally confesses that he loves Sai. The next day, a nervous Aditya tries to profess his love for Sai. Dada Mama witnesses Bhai Mama and Bandhu Mama telling Aditya about Sindhu and gets furious. Further, enraged by Aditya's words, he falls unconscious. Everyone rushes Dada Mama at the hospital. The doctor's diagnosis leaves everyone worried. Later, Sai and Aditya thank Suyash.

After some time, Sai's marriage is arranged with Suyash and Aditya's with Meghna. But Sai and Aditya have a deep love for each other. After a few days, Dada Mama realises his mistake and tries to reconcile Aditya's marriage with Sai, but Sai's marriage with Suyash is already fixed. Then all the mama plans to break up Sai and Suyash's marriage and raise Aditya in place of Suyash and in this plan mama succeeds and Sai and Aditya get married. Sai and Aditya marriage succeeded but the problems are not over still there are many mysteries left like the marriage suspense about Bandhu Mama and Aditya being the owner of the Company still working as an employee.

== Cast ==
=== Main ===
- Gautami Deshpande as Sai Shashikant Birajdar / Sai Aditya Kashyap (Desai); Aditya's wife, Appa's grand daughter-in-law, Dada, Bhai, Bandhu & Pintya's daughter-in-law, Shashikant & Sharmila's daughter
- Virajas Kulkarni as Aditya Vijay Kashyap (Desai); Sai's husband, Appa's Grandson, Dada, Bhai, Bandhu & Pintya's nephew, Vijay & Vandana Desai's son

=== Recurring ===
Aditya's family

- Atul Parchure as Jaywant Desai (J.D.); Aditya's uncle, Vijay's brother
- Achyut Potdar as Vinayak Brahme (Appa); Sai's grand father-in-law, Aditya's grandfather, Dada, Bhai, Bandhu & Pintya's father
- Vidyadhar Joshi as Jagdish Vinayak Brahme (Dada); Sai's father-in-law, Aditya's mama, Bhai, Bandhu & Pintya's brother, Sindhu's husband, Appa's son
- Seema Deshmukh as Sindhu Sohoni / Sindhu Jagdish Brahme; Sai's Mother-in-law, Aditya's mami, Dada's wife, Appa's daughter-in-law
- Vinay Yedekar as Janardan Vinayak Brahme (Bhai); Sai's father-in-law, Aditya's mama, Dada, Bandhu & Pintya's brother, Appa's son
- Sunil Tawde as Prabhakar Vinayak Brahme (Bandhu); Sai's father-in-law, Aditya's mama, Dada, Bhai & Pintya's brother, Gulprit's husband, Appa's son
- Dipti Joshi as Gulprit Prabhakar Brahme (Gullu); Sai's mother-in-law, Aditya's mami, Bandhu's wife, Appa's daughter-in-law
- Rajveersingh Raje as Balwant Prabhakar Brahme (Billu); Aditya's brother, Bandhu & Gulpreet's son, Sai's brother-in-law, Appa's grandson
- Nikhil Ratnaparkhi as Swanand Vinayak Brahme (Pintya); Sai's father-in-law, Aditya's mama, Dada, Bhai & Bandhu's brother, Appa's son

Sai's family

- Sulekha Talwalkar / Varsha Ghatpande as Sharmila Shashikant Birajdar; Sai's mother, Aditya's Mother-in-law, Shashikant's wife
- Atul Kale as Shashikant Birajdar (Baban); Sai's father, Aditya's father-in-law, Sharmila's husband
- Rajesh Uke as Chandu Kaka; Birajdar's servant

Others

- Sujay Hande as Monty Jaywant Desai; Fake identity of Aditya Vijay Desai
- Komal Dhande as Hira Johari; Monty's mother
- Aashay Kulkarni as Suyash Suhas Patwardhan; Sai's fiancé
- Mugdha Puranik as Nayana Yashpal Naik; Sai's friend
- Sanika Gadgil as Meghana Raghuvir Kashikar; Aditya's fiancé
- Dheeraj Kamble as Harishchandra (Filter); Pintya's garage helper
- Leena Palekar as Sujata; Sharmila's friend
- Anisha Sabnis as Madhura; Aditya's ex-fiancé
- Snehal Shidam as Sushma Bansode / Vidya Bhagwan Jhagade; Factory worker's wife
- Lokee Anbhule as Tea Stall's owner
- Sahil Parab as Suyash's friend

== Awards ==
Zee Marathi Utsav Natyancha Awards 2020-21
Category	Recipient	Role	Ref.
Best Title Song	Ashok Patki	Composer	
Best Siblings	Vidyadhar Joshi, Vinay Yedekar, Sunil Tawde & Nikhil Ratnaparkhi	Brahme Boys	
Best Father-in-law	Vidyadhar Joshi, Vinay Yedekar, Sunil Tawde & Nikhil Ratnaparkhi	Brahme Boys	
Best Supporting Male	Atul Kale	Shashikant	
Best Family		Brahme Family	
Best Series	Subodh-Onkar-Sujay	Producer	
Best Actress	Gautami Deshpande	Sai	
Best Couple	Gautami Deshpande-Virajas Kulkarni	Sai-Aditya	

== Production ==
=== Filming ===
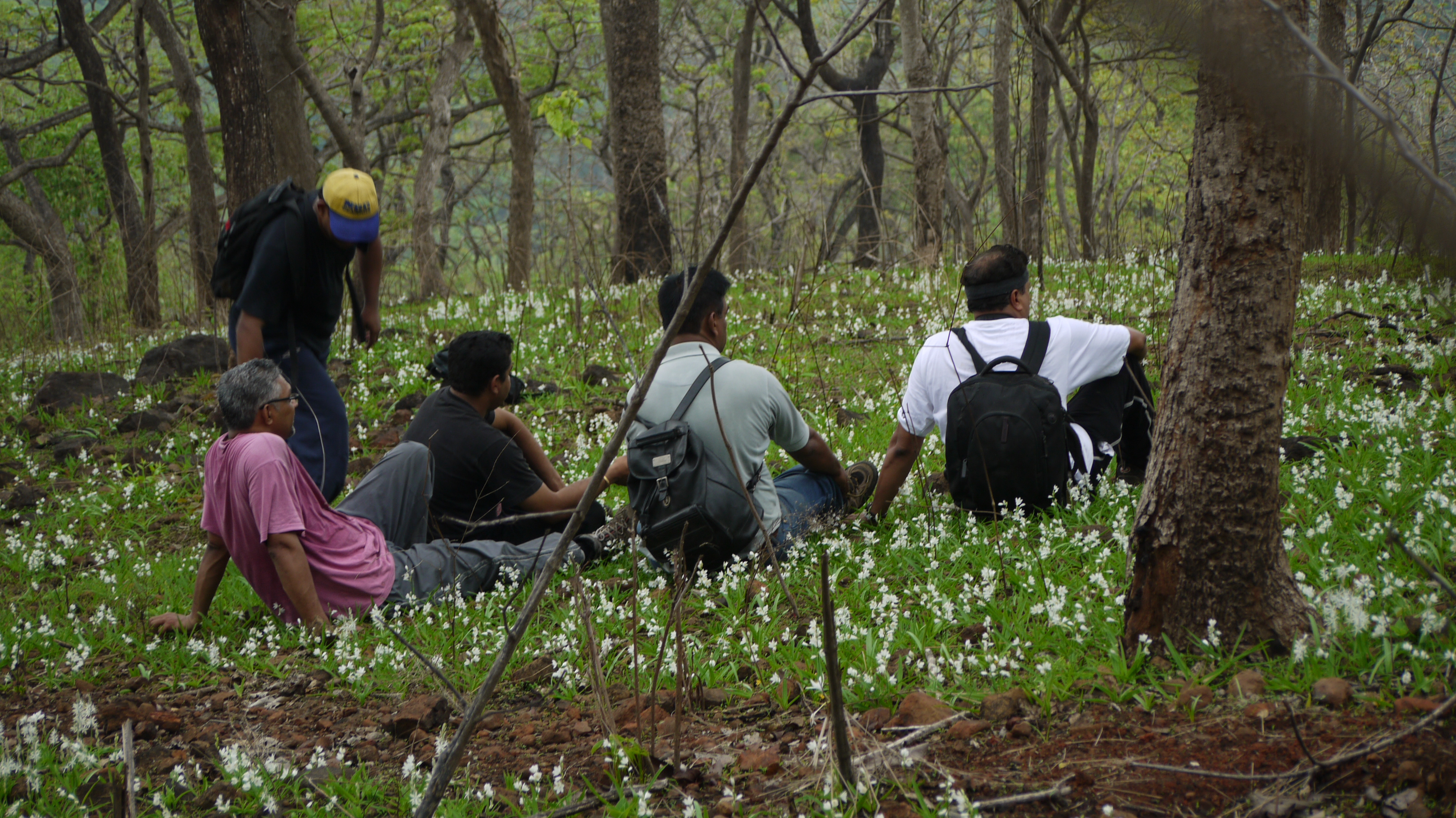
Shooting location at Yeoor

Based on the backdrop of Mumbai, the series mainly filmed on the sets created at the Yeoor in Thane with some initial sequence were shot in Mumbai. The village track of Sai and Aditya was shot in Dapoli. Sai and Aditya's honeymoon scene was shot in Manali. On 14 April 2021, due to the sudden strict COVID regulations set in by the Chief minister of Maharashtra, shooting of all serials were asked to halt. Majha Hoshil Na Team moved to Silvassa and conducted their shoot there till the next hearings. On 17 June 2021 team decided to move back to Mumbai for the shooting of the show.

=== Special episode ===
==== 1 hour ====
- 1 November 2020
- 13 December 2020
- 18 April 2021

==== 2 hours ====
- 14 February 2021 (Sai-Aditya's Marriage)
- 23 May 2021 (Blockbuster Night with Brahme Boys)

=== Ratings ===
Week	Year	BARC Viewership		Ref.
Week	Year	TRP	Rank	Ref.
Week 13	2020	2.0	3	
Week 28	2020	3.1	3	
Week 36	2020	3.9	1	
Week 37	2020	3.9	3	
Week 38	2020	3.1	5	
