= Moruchi Mavshi =

Play written by Pralhad Keshav Atre

Moruchi Mavshi (मोरूची मावशी)
- CD cover art
- Original language: Marathi
- Written by: Pralhad Keshav Atre
- Characters: Moruchi Mavshi - Moru's aunt who is the Queen of Kanda Sansthan
- Genre: Comedy

Moruchi Mavshi (Devanagari:मोरूची मावशी) is a Marathi play written by playwright Pralhad Keshav Atre. The play is a light hearted comedy. It is best known for Vijay Chavan's iconic role in this famous Marathi Stage drama where he regaled in the title role of Moru's aunt.

== Synopsis ==
Set in the post-Independence era when different sansthans (princely states) of India were being demolished, the play deals with three college friends Moru (Prashant Damle), Bhaiyya (Pradeep Patwardhan) and Bandya (Vijay Chavan). Moru and Bhaiyya are sharing a bungalow they have rented. Moru's aunt, the queen of Kanda Sansthan, is coming visiting. So Moru and Bhaiyya call their girlfriends from their neighborhood to give her company but at the last minute the aunt's visit is cancelled and Bandya, who is playing a female part for a theatre group is coaxed by his two friends to become Moru's aunt. What follows is a fun-filled drama with Bhaiyya's uncle and the girls' uncle proposing to mavshi and the arrival of the real mavshi and her niece who happens to be Bandya's girlfriend.

== Style ==
Singing and dancing are used here to good effect laced with comedy. The main highlight of the play was 'Tang ting tinga', a song from the play where Chavan is at his best - dancing, jumping, playing games in a sari.

== Original cast and crew ==
- Vijay Chavan : Moru's aunt, the Queen of Kanda Sansthan
- Prashant Damle : Moru
- Pradeep Patwardhan : Bhaiya
- Artist : Vijay Chavan, Prashant Damle, Pradeep Patwardhan, Suresh Takle, Vijay Salvi, Vasanti Nimkar, Roshni Murkar, Chetna Gadgil, Shilpa Parkar, Narayan Sardal
- Ashok Patki : Music
- Sunil Barve : Sutradhar
- Mangesh Kadam : Direction
- Dilip Kolhatkar : Rangamanch Direction
- Nilesh Shinde : Assistant Rangamanch Direction

== New cast and crew ==
After the success of an old 'Moruchi Mavshi' which was released in 1985, Suyog Productions has launched the remake of 'Moruchi Mavshi' with an all new star cast in January 2014. The play is hilarious and ends on a very positive note. Bharat Jadhav is Playing Moruchi Mavshi in the new set. The play started on 26 January 2014.

- Bharat Jadhav : Moru's aunt, the Queen of Kanda Sansthan, Bandya/ Prabhakar
- Ashutosh Gokhale : Moru
- Advait Dadarkar : Bhaiyaji
- Tejshree Sawant : Usha
- Rekha Kambli : Nisha

The other crew is Ashutosh Gokhale, Nagesh Morvekar, Mahesh Kokate, Esha Vadanekar, Malvika Marathe.

The new set production team is as follows:

- Production : Suyog Productions
- Producer : Sudhir Bhat & Gopal Algeri
- Writer : Acharya Atre
- Director : Mangesh Kadam
- Music Composer : Ashok Patki
- Set Design : Pradeep Mule
- Lights : Kishor Ingle

== Film adaptation ==
It's the same play which has inspired Govinda's drag act in Aunty No. 1 (1998).
