= Aamne Saamne =

Marathi-language comedy-drama play

- Original language: Marathi
- Written by: Neeraj Shirvaikar
- Music by: Vijay Narayan Gavande
- Subject: Marriage, live-in relationships, generation gap
- Genre: Comedy-drama

Premiere
- Date: 30 October 2019
- Place: Ramkrishna More Prekshagriha, Pune
- Directed by: Neeraj Shirvaikar
- Original run: 150 minutes

Aamne Saamne (lit. 'Face to Face') is a Marathi-language comedy drama play written and directed by Neeraj Shirvaikar. It stars Mangesh Kadam and Leena Bhagwat, who are also its producers, alongside a younger couple played originally by Rohan Gujar and Madhura Deshpande, with Ketaki Vilas later replacing Deshpande, before Vilas was replaced by Rutuja Dharap and Gujar by Tejas Raut. The play follows two couples from different generations living next door to each other, and uses their contrasting views on marriage to explore the generation gap between traditional marriage and modern relationships.

The play won the Best Commercial Play award at the Zee Natya Gaurav Puraskar in 2020. It has had a long commercial run, and by 2026 continued to draw large audiences. In October 2026 the play became the subject of a public dispute over actor remuneration after Gujar and Vilas were replaced in the cast.

== Premise ==
The play centers on an older couple, Anant and Neelima, and a younger couple, Sahil and Sameera, who become neighbours in the same building. Sahil is a writer struggling to find work who stays at home and manages the household, while Sameera is portrayed as bold and deliberate in her decisions. The differences in the two couples' outlooks on marriage, live-in relationships and family expectations form the basis of the comedy and conflict.

The play is structured so that in the first act the older couple narrate and observe the lives of the younger couple, while in the second act the roles are reversed and the younger couple observe the older couple's relationship. The actors also interact directly with the audience during the performance.

== Cast ==
- Mangesh Kadam as Anant
- Leena Bhagwat as Neelima Joshi
- Rohan Gujar as Sahil Purohit (2019–2026)
  - Tejas Raut as Sahil Purohit (from October 2026)
- Madhura Deshpande as Sameera Patkar (2019–2023)
  - Ketaki Vilas as Sameera Patkar (from November 2023)
    - Rutuja Dharap as Sameera Patkar (from October 2026)

== Performances ==
The play had a slow commercial run until its 350th performance, its popularity grew grew following a digital marketing campaign led by Amey Mondkar, which used social media content and audience engagement. The play has been staged at venues across Maharashtra and has also toured internationally, including in Canada. It completed its 100th performance on 15 May 2022 at Ram Ganesh Gadkari Rangayatan in Thane.

During a performance at Mama Varerkar Natyagruha in Malvan in February 2026, actors Leena Bhagwat and Mangesh Kadam paused the show to draw attention to the theatre's unhygienic washrooms and damaged seats, urging authorities to improve facilities for artists and audiences. In September 2026, Bhagwat announced a temporary break from the play on medical advice, citing vocal strain from frequent sold-out performances. By October 2026, Rohan Gujar had performed in approximately 670 shows, while Ketaki Vilas had appeared in approximately 520.

Tejas Raut and Rutuja Dharap joined the cast on 30 October 2026, making their debut at Ramkrishna More Natyagruha in Chinchwad.

== Reception ==
=== Critical response ===
Anup Satphale of The Times of India rated the play 3 out of 5 stars, writing that it "keeps you laughing and puts a smile on your face for quite a while after it ends." Reviewer Anuja described it as "the most fun I’ve had at the theatre in ages" and observed, "When neighbours become mirrors, sometimes the funniest reflections are the hardest truths." Nishad Kinhikar called Aamne Saamne "a blockbuster hit with a modern story, all presented in a hilarious way," praising its narrative for exploring the clash of ideologies between two generations.

=== Accolades ===
Year	Awards	Category	Recipient	Result	Ref.
2020	Zee Natya Gaurav Purashkar	Best Play	Aamne Saamne	Won	
2020	Zee Natya Gaurav Purashkar	Best Director	Neeraj Shirvaikar	Won	
2020	Zee Natya Gaurav Purashkar	Best Writer	Neeraj Shirvaikar	Nominated	
2020	Zee Natya Gaurav Purashkar	Best Actor	Mangesh Kadam	Nominated	
2020	Zee Natya Gaurav Purashkar	Best Actress	Leena Bhagwat	Nominated	
2020	Zee Natya Gaurav Purashkar	Best Supporting Actor	Rohan Gujar	Nominated	
2020	Zee Natya Gaurav Purashkar	Best Supporting Actress	Madhura Deshpande	Won	
2021	MaTa Sanman	Best Play	Aamne Saamne	Won	
2021	MaTa Sanman	Best Director	Neeraj Shirvaikar	Nominated	
2021	MaTa Sanman	Best Writer	Neeraj Shirvaikar	Won	
2021	MaTa Sanman	Best Actor	Mangesh Kadam	Nominated	
2021	MaTa Sanman	Best Actress	Leena Bhagwat	Won	
2021	MaTa Sanman	Best Art Director	Pradeep Mulye	Nominated	
2022	Sanskruti Kala Darpan Award	Best Play	Aamne Saamne	Won	
2022	Sanskruti Kala Darpan Award	Best Director	Neeraj Shirvaikar	Won	
2022	Sanskruti Kala Darpan Award	Best Writer	Neeraj Shirvaikar	Nominated	
2022	Sanskruti Kala Darpan Award	Best Actor	Mangesh Kadam	Nominated	
2022	Sanskruti Kala Darpan Award	Best Actress	Leena Bhagwat	Won	
2022	Sanskruti Kala Darpan Award	Best Supporting Actor	Rohan Gujar	Nominated	
2022	Sanskruti Kala Darpan Award	Best Supporting Actress	Madhura Deshpande	Nominated	
2022	Sanskruti Kala Darpan Award	Best Art Director	Pradeep Mulye	Nominated	

== Cast replacement controversy ==
In October 2026, Rohan Gujar and Ketaki Vilas posted a video on social media stating that, after a performance at Ravindra Natya Mandir in Prabhadevi on 18 October 2026, they had been informed during a meeting that it was their final show. They said they had been removed without prior notice after asking for an increase in their fees.

The play's producers, Leena Bhagwat and Mangesh Kadam, responded with a video of their own. They stated that the actors had requested a fee increase for the third time, that the two earlier requests had been accepted, and that the third request came with an expectation of annual increases, which they said was not financially feasible. Gujar and Vilas later posted another video saying that the three requests had been made over approximately eight years, rather than within a single year.

The dispute drew reactions from Marathi film and theatre personalities, including Mayuri Deshmukh, Rutuja Bagwe and Vardhan Kamath. Veteran actress Vandana Gupte said actors had the right to seek higher remuneration, but that removing performers abruptly and without notice was inappropriate. Actor and theatre veteran Prashant Damle said disagreements between producers and actors should be resolved through mutual understanding and communication, adding that “it takes two hands to clap” and that external issues should never affect a performance. Actor-director Mahesh Manjrekar told News18 Marathi that suddenly removing actors from a production is “extremely wrong,” particularly when they had supported it for nearly seven years.
