= Shriyut Gangadhar Tipre =

Indian television sitcom

- Genre: Sitcom; Comedy
- Based on: Anudini
- Written by: Dilip Prabhavalkar
- Directed by: Kedar Shinde
- Starring: See below
- Theme music composer: Ashok Patki
- Country of origin: India
- Original language: Marathi
- No. of episodes: 165

Production
- Producers: Bharat Jadhav; Bela Shinde
- Camera setup: Multi-camera
- Running time: 22 minutes

Original release
- Network: Alpha TV Marathi
- Release: 2 November 2001 – 7 January 2005

Shriyut Gangadhar Tipre is an Indian television series that aired on Alpha TV Marathi. The series started from 2 November 2001 and ended on 24 December 2004 after 165 episodes. The series was rerun in the COVID-19 pandemic on viewers demand from 15 June to 11 July 2020.

== Plot ==
Picture a middle-class Maharashtrian family facing the ups and downs of everyday life. 'Shriyut Gangadhar Tipre' is like a snapshot into their world, where they tackle normal problems but always stick together. From dealing with daily routines to chasing dreams, the family shows how even the simplest moments can be special. The show is a mix of laughter and heart, bringing out the beauty in the ordinary moments we all experience. It's like watching your own family, making you laugh, relate, and appreciate the little things in life.

== Cast ==
=== Main ===
- Dilip Prabhavalkar in the role of Shriyut Gangadhar Tipre (Aaba)
- Shubhangi Gokhale in the role of Shyamal Shekhar Tipre; Aaba's Daughter-in-law, Shekhar's wife, Shirya and Shalaka's mother
- Rajan Bhise in the role of Shekhar Gangadhar Tipre; Aaba's son, Shyamal's husband, Shirya and Shalaka's father
- Vikas Kadam in the role of Shrilesh Shekhar Tipre (Shirya); Aaba's grandson, Shyamal and Shekhar's son, Shalaka's brother
- Reshma Naik in the role of Shalaka Shekhar Tipre; Aaba's granddaughter, Shyamal and Shekhar's daughter, Shirya's sister

=== Recurring ===
- Smita Talwalkar in the role of Meenakshi; Shyamal's childhood friend
- Mukta Barve in the role of Yogita
- Supriya Pathare in the role of Tipre's neighbour
- Sunil Barve in the role of Siddharth
- Sumukhi Pendse in the role of Shaila
- Ravindra Berde in the role of Shirya's interviewer
- Kshitee Jog in the role of Nikita

== Awards ==
Aapla Alpha Awards
Category	Recipient	Role
Best Actor	Dilip Prabhavalkar	Gangadhar Tipre (Aaba)
Best Mother	Shubhangi Gokhale	Shyamala Tipre
Best Family		Tipre family
