= Saare Tujhyachsathi =

Indian television drama

- Genre: Drama; Romance
- Screenplay by: Chinmay Mandlekar; Dialogues; Shweta Pendse
- Directed by: Manish Khandelwal
- Starring: See below
- Theme music composer: Avinash-Vishwajit
- Opening theme: "Saare Tujhyachsathi" by Rohit Raut; Juilee Joglekar
- Country of origin: India
- Original language: Marathi
- No. of episodes: 343

Production
- Producer: Shashank Ganesh Solanki
- Camera setup: Multi-Camera
- Running time: 22 minutes
- Production company: Seventh Sense Media

Original release
- Network: Sony Marathi
- Release: 20 August 2018 – 28 September 2019

Saare Tujhyachsathi (transl. All for you) is an Indian Marathi language television series which aired on Sony Marathi. It starred Gautami Deshpande and Harshad Atkari in lead roles. It premiered from 20 August 2018 and ended on 28 September 2019.

== Plot ==
It is the story of Shruti and Kartik who come from different backgrounds. Shruti is a boxer and Kartik, a classical singer. Both are passionate about their professions and do not have marriage on their mind. However, on the insistence of their families, they decide to explore the idea of marriage set up. The show explores the nuances of both courtship and arrange marriage.

== Cast ==
=== Main ===
- Gautami Deshpande as Shruti
- Harshad Atkari as Kartik
- Milind Gawali as Shruti's Coach

=== Recurring ===
- Vishakha Subhedar
- Avinash Narkar
- Sarita Mehendale
- Rakesh Date
- Sonam Pawar
- Bhagyashree Dalvi
- Madhura Joshi
- Gurudatta Divekar
- Manjusha Godse
- Akansha Gade
