= Leena Bhagwat =

Indian actress

- Born: 22 January 1975 (age 51); Mumbai, India
- Occupation: Actress
- Years active: 1999-present
- Spouse: Mangesh Kadam (m. 2012)

Leena Bhagwat is an Indian actress in Marathi language television, theatre, and film. She is known for playing the character of Sharayu in Honar Soon Mi Hya Gharchi. She also participated in Fu Bai Fu as a contestant. As of now, she is playing the role of Suvarna Kanitkar in Thipkyanchi Rangoli.

== Personal life ==
Bhagwat is married to Marathi play director Mangesh Kadam.

== Filmography ==
=== Films ===
Year	Title	Role	Notes
1999	Kairee	Tulsa	Debut
2007	Dohaa	Bhiki	Supporting role
2008	Dhudgus		Supporting role
2009	Gandha	Chanda Tai	Supporting role
2013	Aajcha Divas Majha	Madhuri Adhikari	Supporting role
2014	Avatarachi Goshta	Kaustubh's mother	Supporting role
2025	Tu Bol Na	Manava's mother	Supporting role

=== Plays ===
- Goshta Tashi Gamtichi
- Adhantar
- Chal Tujhi Seat Pakki
- Vaishali Cottage
- Aamne Saamne
- Evalese Rop

=== Television ===
Year	Title	Role	Channel	Notes
2007-2008	Ya Sukhanno Ya	Inspector Shruja	Zee Marathi	Debut
2009-2010	Agnihotra	Shalini Saraf	Star Pravah	
2012	Eka Lagnachi Dusri Goshta	Supriya Kale	Zee Marathi	
2012-2013	Fu Bai Fu	Contestant	Zee Marathi	
2013-2016	Honar Soon Mi Hya Gharchi	Sharayu Gokhale (Chhoti Aai)	Zee Marathi	
2020	Aathshe Khidkya Naushe Daara	Indu Karkumbhkar	Sony Marathi	
2021–2023	Thipkyanchi Rangoli	Suvarna Kanitkar	Star Pravah	
2022	Aata Hou De Dhingana	Contestant	Star Pravah	

== Awards ==
- Zee Chitra Gaurav Puraskar for Best Supporting Actress for film Avatarachi Goshta
- Sanskruti Kaladarpan Gaurav Rajani 2015 - Best Actress
- Akhil Bhartiya Natya Parishad - Special prize
- Best Mother-in-law in Zee Marathi Utsav Natyancha Awards 2015 & 2013
- Thane Municipal Corporation and Janakavi P. Savlaram Kala Samiti’s Ganga-Jamuna Award
