= Mon Potongo =

- Official film poster
- Directed by: Rajdeep Paul; Sarmistha Maiti
- Written by: Rajdeep Paul; Sarmistha Maiti
- Release date: 13 December 2024
- Country: India
- Language: Bengali

Mon Potongo is a 2024 Bengali-language drama film directed and written by Rajdeep Paul and Sarmistha Maiti. The film stars Subhankar Mohanta, Baishakhi Roy, Seema Biswas, Joy Sengupta, Tannistha Biswas, Anindita Ghosh and Amit Saha.

== Cast ==
- Subhankar Mohanta as Hasan
- Baishakhi Roy as Lokkhi
- Seema Biswas as Josna
- Joy Sengupta as Amitabha
- Tannistha Biswas as Rumi
- Anindita Ghosh as Pinky
- Amit Saha as Bapon

== Plot ==
Mon Potongo follows Hasan and Lokkhi, two young labourers from different religious backgrounds who form a close bond while struggling with poverty and social tensions.

== Reception ==
The film received positive reviews from several critics. Sangbad Pratidin praised its themes of dreams, hardship and life on the streets.

The Wall praised the direction, performances of Subhankar Mohanta and Baishakhi Roy, cinematography, and the film's portrayal of marginalised people. The Times of India, director Sarmistha Maiti described Mon Potongo as a story about desire and the pursuit of dreams beyond social identity.

== Awards and nominations ==
Year	Award	Category	Recipient / Result
2024	Kolkata International Film Festival	Golden Royal Bengal Tiger Award for Best Bengali Film	Won
2025	Joy Filmfare Awards Bangla	Best Debut Male	Won
2025	Joy Filmfare Awards Bangla	Best Debut Female	Won
2025	Joy Filmfare Awards Bangla	Best Film (Critics')	Nominated
2025	Joy Filmfare Awards Bangla	Best Actress (Critics')	Nominated
