= Seema Biswas =

Indian film and theatre actress

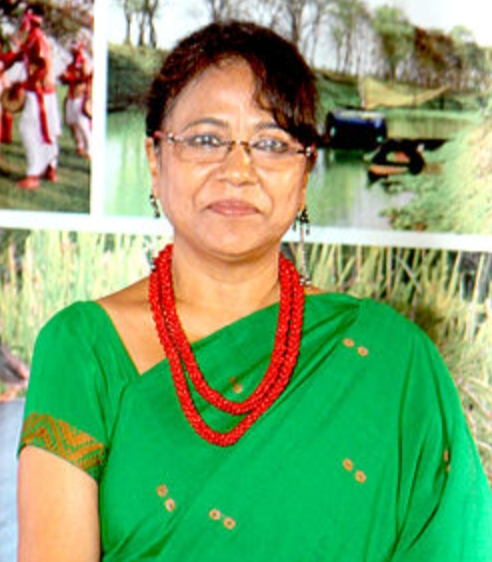
- Biswas in 2009
- Born: 14 January 1965 (age 61); Nalbari, Assam, India
- Occupation: Actress
- Years active: 1988–present

Seema Biswas (born 14 January 1965) is an Indian actress who works in Hindi films and the theatre. She gained prominence after playing the role of Phoolan Devi in Shekhar Kapur's film Bandit Queen (1994), for which she won the National Film Award for Best Actress. She won the 2000 Sangeet Natak Akademi Award and the 2006 Best Actress Genie Award for her role as Shakuntala in Deepa Mehta's Water (2005). Her other mainstream films include Khamoshi: The Musical (1996), for which she won the Screen Award for Best Supporting Actress, Bhoot (2003), Vivah (2006) and Half Girlfriend (2017). In addition to films, Biswas has appeared in many television shows, most recently, The Family Man.

== Personal life and education ==
Biswas was born in a Bengali family at Nalbari, Assam, to Jagdish Biswas and Meera Biswas. After completing her primary education, she graduated in political science with honours from Nalbari College, Assam. She studied dramatic arts at the National School of Drama in New Delhi.

Biswas had married Nikhilesh Sharma, who's a film producer, but they later got divorced. Since then Biswas has been single.

== Career ==
Biswas played the lead in Krishnan Kartha's Amshini (Hindi), it entered the Indian Panorama Section of Filmotsav 1988. However, the general belief is that she debuted after Shekhar Kapur watched her perform in the NSD Repertory Company and offered her a role in Bandit Queen. Although she had earlier acted in Assamese cinema, this was her first big break into Hindi cinema.

In 1996, she played the role of Flavy, a deaf and mute woman in Sanjay Leela Bhansali's Khamoshi: The Musical opposite Nana Patekar and won the Screen Award for Best Supporting Actress.

Rooted firmly in theatre, she refuses to be typecast, and has worked in a variety of films and character roles. She has also worked in Marathi, Malayalam and Tamil films. Some of her Marathi films are Bindhast, Dhyaas Parwa and Lalbaug-Parel.

She has been honoured with the Life Membership of International Film And Television Club of Asian Academy Of Film & Television by the director Sandeep Marwah.

In 2014, Biswas was a jury member of the 45th International Film Festival of India, held from 20 to 30 November at Goa.

== Filmography ==
=== Films ===
Year	Title	Role	Language
1988	Amshini	Sarada	Hindi
1994	Bandit Queen	Phoolan Devi	Hindi
1996	Khamoshi: The Musical	Flavy J. Braganza	Hindi
1997	Ladies Only		Hindi
1998	Hazaar Chaurasi Ki Maa	Somu's mother	Hindi
1999	Bindhaast	CBI officer	Marathi
1999	Samar	Dulari	Hindi
2001	Dhyasparva	Malati Karve	Marathi
2001	Shantham		Malayalam
2002	Deewangee	Psychiatrist	Hindi
2002	Company	Ranibai	Hindi
2002	Ghaav: The Wound	Tanya	Hindi
2003	Boom	Bharti	Hindi, English
2003	Bhoot	Bai	Hindi
2003	Iyarkai	Mercy	Tamil
2003	Pinjar	Pagli- Mad woman	Hindustani, Punjabi
2004	Kaya Taran	Sister Agatha	Hindi
2004	Dobara		Hindi
2004	Ek Hasina Thi	ACP Malti Vaidya	Hindi, English
2004	Hanan	Mrs. Heeralal	Hindi, Bengali, English
2005	Water	Shakuntala	English, Hindi
2005	Mumbai Godfather	Inspector Anjali	Hindi
2005	The White Land	Sudha's mother	Hindi
2006	Vivah	Rama	Hindi
2006	Shoonya	Pradhan	Hindi
2006	Thalaimagan	S. Alankaram	Tamil
2006	Zindaggi Rocks		Hindi
2007	Sofia	The Madam	English
2007	Risk	Devki Wardhan	Hindi
2007	Amal	Sapna Agarwal	English, Hindi
2008	Striker	Siddharth's mother	Hindi
2008	Shaurya	Captain Javed Khan's mother	Hindi
2008	Heaven on Earth		English, Punjabi
2008	Yeh Mera India	Bai	Hindi
2009	Cooking with Stella	Stella	English, Hindi
2009	Dujone	Meghna's aunt	Bengali
2010	Lalbaug Parel	Mother	Marathi
2011	Queens! Destiny Of Dance	Guru Amma	Hindi
2011	Patang	Sudha	Hindi, Gujarati, English
2011	With Love, Delhi!	Mother	English
2012	Midnight's Children	Mary	English
2013	Oonga	Laxmi	Hindi, Odia
2014	Chaarfutiya Chhokare	Janki	Hindi
2014	Manjunath	Manjunath's Mother	Hindi
2014	Sold	Amma	English
2014	Balyakalasakhi	Selvi	Malayalam
2014	Endless Summer		Malayalam
2015	Jai Ho Democracy	Mohini Devi	Hindi
2016	Kothanodi	Dhoneshwari	Assamese
2016	A Yellow Bird	Siva's mother	Tamil, Mandarin, English
2016	Freaky Ali	Ali's Mother	Hindi
2016	Anatomy of Violence		Hindi
2016	Holding Back		Hindi
2016	Project Marathwada		Hindi
2017	Half Girlfriend	Rani Sahiba, Madhav's mother	Hindi
2017	Sameer	Mumtaz Khala	Hindi
2017	Soul Curry		Konkani
2017	Dhiya Poota	Kakiya	Bhojpuri
2018	Bhoga Khirikee		Assamese
2019	Darkness Visible	Rakhee	Hindi
2020	Idam	Bhanu	Malayalam
2020	Funny Boy	Ammachi	English, Tamil, Sinhala
2021	Atrangi Re	Naani	Hindi
2022	Bachchhan Paandey	Mrs. Paandey	Hindi
2023	Sir Madam Sarpanch	Parvati	Hindi
2024	Political War	Sunita Chatterjee	Hindi
2024	Sarfira	Veer’s Mother	Hindi
2024	Visfot	Acid Tai	Hindi
2024	Mon Potongo		Bengali
2025	Raktabeej 2		Bengali
2025	Jolly LLB 3	Janki Rajaram Solanki	Hindi

=== Television ===
Year	Title	Role
2014–15	Maha Kumbh: Ek Rahasaya, Ek Kahani	Mai Mui
2019	Leila	Madhu
2020	Daadi Amma Daadi Amma Maan Jaao!	Daadi Amma
2020	Code M	Asif's mother
2021–present	The Family Man	PM Basu
2022	Human	Roma Ma
2022	Breathe: Into the Shadows	Dr. Indu Rao
2023	Kaalkoot	Ravi's mother
2025	Om Kali Jai Kali	Kaathadi
2025-present	Bindiya Ke Bahubali	Sanka Davan
2026	Hunkkaar	the Judge

== Awards ==
Year	Award	Film	Category	Result
1996	National Film Awards	Bandit Queen	Best Actress	Won
