= Supervasi =

Indian non-profit for improving society

Supervasi Foundation
- Formation: June 8, 2012; 14 years ago
- Founder: Glenn Fernandes
- Type: NGO
- Legal status: Non-profit Company (Section 25)
- Headquarters: Thane, Maharashtra
- Region served: India
- Services: Medical Devices, ERP systems, Business software, HTML5 Websites, BPO services
- Official language: English, Hindi, Marathi
- Website: supervasi.com

Supervasi is a non-profit organisation and movement based in Maharashtra, India, formed for the purpose of using technology to improve e-governance, business and society.

Supervasi is run by members from various fields. Volunteers come from various parts of India and Europe, and work on a non-salaried basis. It has developed low-cost medical devices such as the Snakeathon Ambulance and Super Ventilator. It provides job opportunities and apprenticeship programs for the underprivileged indigenous tribals (Adivasis) and hearing disabled. It also provides various educational, medical and legal services to the tribals of Yeoor, Maharashtra.

Supervasi's funding comes from information technology projects undertaken by the organization, which funds their social projects. Their services include development of enterprise resource planning systems, business software and websites. Supporting services include business process outsourcing and data entry.

The programs run by the organization target the tribal population of India, which suffer from poor living conditions and lack of livelihood, many of whom are illiterate and uneducated.

== History ==
In 2003, a team of 10 volunteers assembled in Mumbai for the development of integrated social systems, from disciplines such as software, electronics, medical, bio-technology, sustainable development & management. They conducted research & development into software, education, healthcare, agriculture, and construction.

After nearly a decade of research, Supervasi was founded in June 2012 by Glenn Fernandes, a visionary technologist who worked in Siemens India for 20 years before he quit his job to dedicate his life to social work. The organization was registered as a non-profit private company, "Creative Responsible Integrated Systems Foundation" (then known as "CriSys Foundation"). It was officially renamed to Supervasi Foundation in March 2017.

Between 2009 and 2012, they toured the "Tribal Belt of India", to study and understand the problems of the impoverished tribals living in remote regions. They decided to start with the development of the Yeoor-based tribal population.

In 2012, they launched the SuperBusiness ERP cloud platform with the "Artificial Intelligence for Business" engine (5th Generation Language), in order to fund the rehabilitation and non-profit activities of the organization. They also began the Jungle BPO program, which provides a complete range of Business Process Outsourcing services wherein work is completed by tribal apprentices. Jungle BPO centers create computer job opportunities in remote regions.

In 2015, Glenn Fernandes and Dr. Sarita Parikh designed an ultra low-cost ventilator (Super Ventilator), which is an essential component of modern healthcare and many first-aid situations. The device is low-power that imitates natural breathing, and causes no harm or further illness to patients.

On March 8, 2015 (International Woman's Day), Ms. Apoorva Agwan, VP of Sustainable Development at Supervasi was awarded the Samarth Ti Puraskar Award 2015 from the Samarth Bharat Vyaspeeth institution, for her "outstanding contribution to the field of women empowerment, women education and snakebite management".

In April 2015, Supervasi conducted a free Vaccination and Health Camp for over 350 tribal residents of Yeoor, in collaboration with Rotary Club of Thane Premium and Mumbai Lakers. They also conducted a free Health Checkup Camp with Salvage Nation NGO, in the same month.

In August 2015, Supervasi conducted a Free Documents Registration Camp in Yeoor for over 500 tribal residents of Yeoor, to help them obtain vital legal identification such as PAN Card, Voter's ID, Income Certificate, etc.

In September 2015, Supervasi and Rotary Club of Thane North jointly conducted a Lung Health Checkup Camp to identify and help treat Tuberculosis (TB) patients in Yeoor. Over 200 people attended. Further lung camps were conducted the same year.

In October 2016, Supervasi conducted an Eye and Blood Test Camp for over 350 tribal residents of Yeoor. The event was sponsored by Rotary Club of Thane North and Rotary Club of Thane Premium.

In 2016, they conducted child education and adult literacy courses for the tribal population of Yeoor as part of the Unmol Education program, using multimedia based education.

On 8 April 2017, Ms. Apoorva Agwan of Supervasi won the Gaurav Stree Kartutvacha 2017 Award from Pudhari Thane, awarded for her outstanding contribution to the Adivasi community of Yeoor, Thane.

== Projects ==
=== Super Ventilator ===
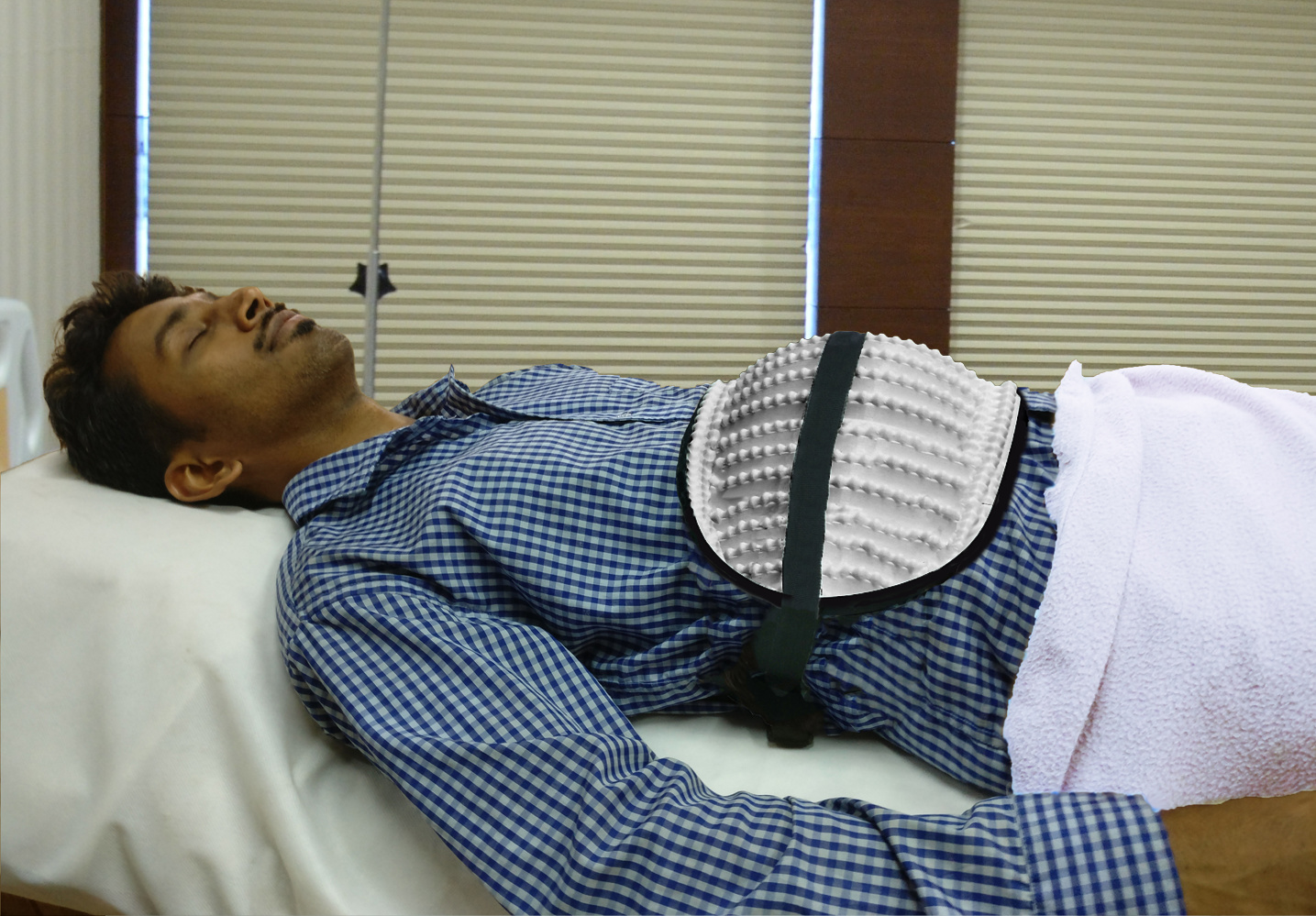
A patient wearing the Super Ventilator, a low-cost first aid device

Since 2015, Supervasi has been developing the Super Ventilator, which is an ultra low-cost mechanical ventilator, essential to many first-aid situations. The device is low-power and imitates natural breathing, and causes no harm or further illness to patients. It is an innovative non-invasive ventilator, useful for anyone with respiratory illnesses such as asthma or bronchitis, and even useful in cases of heart-attack, strokes, accidents, poisoning, etc.

There is an acute shortage of mechanical ventilators in India; based on hospital-bed-to-ventilator statistics, India is short of one million mechanical ventilators. Ventilators are required in seven major departments like medicine, pediatrics, pediatric surgery, surgery, orthopedics, chest medicine and TB, ENT and gynecology.

Compared to conventional mechanical ventilators that cost around 2.5 Million Indian Rupees (upwards of $20,000), the Super Ventilator costs just 25,000 Indian Rupees, making it affordable by all hospitals and villages. Also, conventional ventilators are often too complex and fragile for use in harsh rural environments. The goal of the device is "one ventilator per bed" in every hospital.

=== PACT Program ===
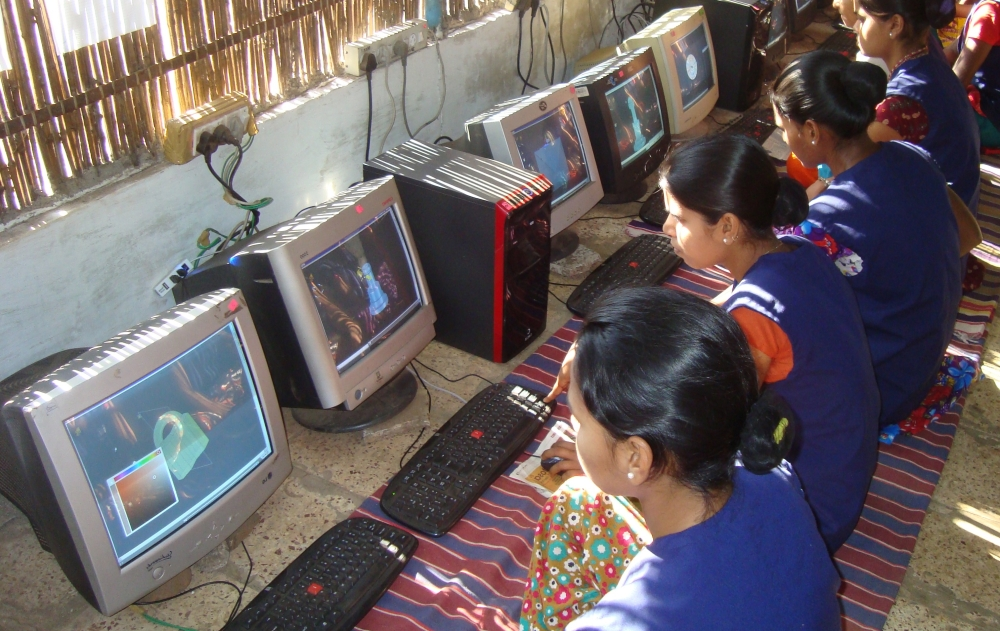
Tribal youth students learning 3D modeling within the PACT program.

Since 2014, Supervasi has been training tribal youth in advanced computer skills and foreign languages, in a residential program known as Pratigya Apprenticeship for Community Transformation (PACT). In 2014, it started a pilot PACT center in Yeoor, Maharashtra.

Apprentices are trained in computer software, graphic design, animation, and digitization of documents. Language experts also volunteer with the organization, to teach apprentices foreign languages like German and Arabic. The apprentices are also developing educational multimedia relevant for tribals, which will be used to provide free education for tribals across the India. The candidates also use their skills to train youth from their local villages, and help them earn a living.

The trained apprentices are required to help the NGO in carrying out their snakebite project by distributing safety kits developed by it.

=== Snakeathon Project ===
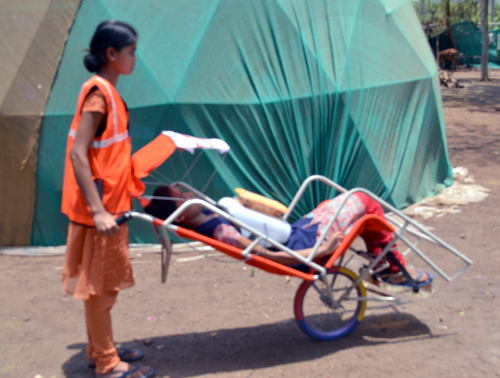
The mono-wheel stretcher designed for off-road transport of snakebite victims

In 2014, Supervasi developed innovative relief measures for victims of snakebite. The primary relief measure is a "mono-wheel ambulance" for areas that lack roads and vehicles, areas that are completely disconnected from the road network.

The mono-wheel ambulance is a stretcher that can be carried or pulled by a bicycle, with an integrated portable ventilator to provide respiratory support to the victim. Its single-wheel design enables transport on rough and jungle terrain. The relief measures also include a first aid kit. The ambulance kit is to be distributed free of cost to over 300 jungle settlements by June 2014.

The mono-wheel ambulance is suited for rough and rocky terrain, and the portable low/no power ventilator can be used in villages with no electricity.

50% of snakebite cases in the world take place in India. In Thane district alone, snakebites claim up to 10 people a day, and in the monsoon season, the toll rises to 20. A close study of the deaths has shown that it was mostly the male members of the family who had died, bringing hardships to the family. Moreover, three of the four victims had died only because they were unable to reach a hospital in time due to lack of roads in rural areas.

=== Public Interest Litigation ===
In 2014, Dr. Sarita Parikh and Apoorva Agwan of Supervasi filed a Public Interest Litigation in the Bombay High Court, requesting removal of obstructions in distributing the free mono-wheel ambulance kit to tribal areas. The petition urged for direction to the government to set up an emergency team to organise logistics and funding to help deliver snake-bite kits to all affected persons. The petition also stated that the organization was helping the tribals save their lives, and if an individual or an organisation hindered their life-saving work, it amounted to an offence under section 304-A of the Indian Penal Code (culpable homicide not amounting to murder).

In response, the High Court stated that it was "quite impressed by the research which has been done by Supervasi", and acknowledged that they had provided "statistical data about snakebites in Maharashtra and the other States in India" and that they gave "a definite proposal how this problem can be resolved". There has been resistance to their NGO work from Anantashram Trust and some adivasis, including an ex-sarpanch and a social worker. The High Court directed the police in Thane, Maharashtra to ensure that members and apprentices of Supervasi are not obstructed by anyone in carrying out their work.

Following the PIL filed by Dr. Sarita Parikh, on the increasing number of deaths due to snake bites in rural Maharashtra, the Bombay High Court ordered the state government to consider framing an Emergency Medical Services Act along the lines of the one in Gujarat, that will make emergency medical aid as good as a fundamental right.
