= Abhinandan Banerjee =

Indian film director and screenwriter

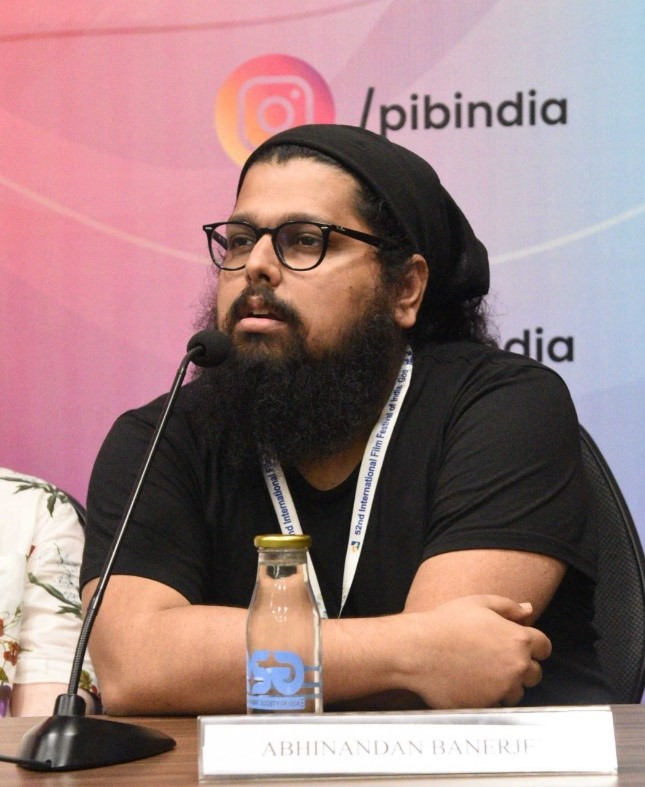
- Born: Kolkata, India
- Occupations: Film director, scriptwriter
- Notable work: Manikbabur Megh, Marichjhapi

Abhinandan Banerjee is an Indian film director, scriptwriter, author, essayist, magazine editor, publisher, illustrator, painter and graphic designer. His debut feature The Cloud and the Man, which premiered at the 25th Tallinn Black Nights Film Festival, 2021 won the NETPAC Award for Best Asian Film, at the 27th Kolkata International Film Festival.

== Early life ==
Born and brought up in Kolkata, Abhinandan Banerjee studied at Barasat Peary Charan Sarkar Government High School. Having finished his schooling, he shifted to Mumbai and went on to study Architecture under University of Mumbai. Later, he would eventually drop out and switch to filmmaking.

At the age of 14 Banerjee started writing and illustrating for newspapers, and little magazines. Later, at the age of 15, he started his own little magazine as the editor and by the age of 18, he was heading his own publication house.

== Career ==
Banerjee co-wrote, assisted, and post-produced Teenkahon (2014) with Bauddhayan Mukherji that won the Best Screenplay award at the Bridge Film Fest, Kosovo. The film was nominated for Best Original Screenplay of a Foreign Language Film at Madrid International Film Festival.

Banerjee then co-founded the creative agency cum production house called Asterisc.

In March 2019 he shot his first feature film The Cloud and the Man produced by Bauddhayan Mukherji and co-produced by Monalisa Mukherji that received the special mention at the NFDC Film Bazaar, 2021. The film premiered at the First Feature Film competition at Tallinn Black Nights Film Festival, 2021.

Marichjhapi, his next collaborative venture with Bauddhayan Mukherji and Little Lamb Films was chosen to represent India at the Asian Project Market at Busan 2019 and Cinéfondation L'Atelier at the Cannes Film Festival 2020.

== Reception ==
The Indian premiere of the film was at 52nd International Film Festival of India (IFFI), 2021. ‘Manikbabur Megh’ was part of the Indian Panorama at the IFFI. The film was also part of the Kaleidoscope section at 26th International Film Festival of Kerala. The film had its North American premiere at the 37th Santa Barbara Film Festival It was in the Jeffery C. Barbakow International Cinema competing with 11 other films from all over the world. The film was also part of the Taipei Golden Horse Fantastic Film Festival (金馬影展 TGHFF) 2022 being the only Indian film in the edition line up.

The film has been declared as one of the top 10 Indian Films of 2021 by Fipresci, India. It was the only Bengali film in the coveted list of top 10 films of 2021 that are in the running for the Fipresci-India Grand Prix.

Banerjee's Manikbabur Megh also won the NETPAC Award for Best Film, at the 27th Kolkata International Film Festival. The NETPAC jury, had the following citation for this award – "very artistically tackled this surrealistic romance between a man on earth and a cloud in the sky."

== Filmography ==
- Marichjhapi
- Teenkahon (2014)
- Manikbabur Megh (2021)

== Other ventures ==
Since 2019 Banerjee has been designing posters under Asterisc's banner for a Bengali audio show called Sunday Suspense by Radio Mirchi and transfigured the aesthetics of the Bengali audio industry like never before. He also wrote and adapted multiple stories for the same show by Radio Mirchi. With his horror short story ‘Roopkatha’, Mirchi started a new vertical under the show called Sunday Suspense Originals.

His stories have been made into shorts, feature films & platform originals. In Bengali, this included Annapurna Basu's ZEE5 Original 'Saat No. Shanatan Sanyal’ (2019), and Rajdeep Ghosh's ‘Shubho Sharodiya’ (TV Movie 2018). In 2023, Banerjee forayed in animation. Presently he is working on three animation shorts under his newly formed boutique house Nandanik Studios. Also, he is presently working on his next Hindi web series & features, other animation projects, upcoming books & graphic novels, and a new game for children.

== Awards ==
- Filmfare Awards Bangla 2025 – Best Film (Critics') for Manikbabur Megh (Shared with Anjan Dutt for Chalchitra Akhon)
- Filmfare Awards Bangla 2025 – Best Lyrics for Tomar Amar Golpo Hoto Jodi from Manikbabur Megh
- Filmfare Awards Bangla 2025 – Best Original Story for Manikbabur Megh
