= Project Marathwada =

- Cinematography: Archit Patel
- Edited by: Nilesh Navnath Gavand; Karan; Karan Soni; Suresh
- Production companies: Eagle Eye Entertainment; Jairush Entertainment; Wadia Production
- Distributed by: Eagle Eye Entertainment; Movietone Digital Entertainment
- Release date: 3 June 2016
- Running time: 110 minutes
- Country: India
- Language: Hindi

Project Marathwada is a 2016 Indian Hindi-language drama film, made by the producer-director duo of Prakash Patel and Bhavin Wadia, along with Niraj Laxmikant Patel, Praful Patel, Sandip Patil, Sadiya Khan and Bhavin Wadia as co-producer. The film is based on the issue of farmer suicides in India and stars Om Puri as a distressed farmer, Tukaram.

The film also stars Govind Namdeo, Dalip Tahil, Kunal Seth, Seema Biswas, Rahul Patel, and Farrah Kader. It follows the story of a Marathwada-based indebted farmer, who comes to Mumbai hoping for help from the government after his son commits suicide. The story takes a twist when he comes across four college students making a documentary on the same subject. The first look of the film was released on 22 September 2015.
