= Holding Back (film) =

- Directed by: Wilson Louis
- Written by: Wilson Louis
- Produced by: Shiela Sandhu
- Starring: Seema Biswas; Ananth Mahadevan; Kunal Kumar
- Production companies: Wilson Louis Films and OSH Productions.
- Release date: 2015
- Running time: 19 minutes 58 seconds
- Country: India
- Language: Hindi

Holding Back is a Hindi short film, directed, written and co-produced by Wilson Louis. Starring Seema Biswas, Anant Mahadevan, and Kunal Kumar - the film is a true story about a mother's deepest emotion to hold back her tears, to save her son from enduring any more pain.

== Plot ==
Holding Back is based on a true incident involving a Mother, her Son and an important journey. In 1999, a Mother and her Son were travelling together to a wedding. Because of the situation surrounding their trip, the inevitable tragedy took place. The Mother, determined to spare her Son any further pain, was forced to rise up, to dig within herself for almost inhuman strength, in order to face the ensuing situation head on.

== Cast ==
- Seema Biswas
- Anant Mahadevan
- Kunal Kumar
- Raj Arjun
- Aditya Lakhia
- Jaywant Wadkar
- Pradeep Patwardhan

== Reception ==
Bobby Talk Cinema says "Directed by Wilson Louis, its indeed a worth praising effort inspired from an actual incident of 1999 and its really good to see the writer-director choosing this thoughtful, emotional subject moving much ahead than the usual ‘attention-seeking’ plots often seen in the world of short films. " Deepak Tripathi of Tiggdigg calls Holding Back masterpiece of Indian Short Films.

== Awards ==
- Finalist, Filmfare Awards 2017 – Top five short films.
- Best Film, Award of Excellence and Best of Show, Best Shorts Competition, California. California shorts-2016
