= Sir Madam Sarpanch =

Hasmukh Saab ki Wasihat
- Directed by: Praveen Morchhale
- Written by: Praveen Morchhale
- Starring: Seema Biswas; Ajay Chourey; Jyoti Dubey; Ariana Sajnani; Bhagwan Tiwari
- Cinematography: Mohammad Reza Jahanpanah
- Edited by: Anthony Joseph
- Music by: Sahil Kulkarni
- Production company: Suncal Productions International
- Distributed by: Sanman Group
- Release date: 14 April 2023
- Country: India
- Language: Hindi

Sir Madam Sarpanch is a 2023 Hindi language film written and directed by Praveen Morchhale. The film stars Seema Biswas, Ajay Chourey and Jyoti Dubey in the lead roles.

== Plot ==
The film revolves around the life of a woman named Parvati (played by Seema Biswas) who is elected as the sarpanch (head) of her village. Being a woman, she faces several challenges and prejudices from the male-dominated society. However, she stands up against all odds and fights for the betterment of her village.

== Cast ==
- Seema Biswas as Parvati
- Ajay Chourey as Ram Singh
- Jyoti Dubey as Gauri
- Ariana Sajnani as Ana
- Bhagwan Tiwari as Bhaiiya ji

== Reception ==
Shubhra Gupta, writing for the Indian Express, remarked, "A film that dares to accommodate these lines is a rarity. However, they become overshadowed by the mundane storytelling. The subplot involving the 'madam sarpanch,' who outsmarts her thuggish husband (Bhagwan Tiwari), relegates the attempted subversion to a secondary role. The criticisms aimed at 'TV anchors who spread hate' and corrupt politicians who are skilled deceivers end up being ineffective. It's important to note that good intentions don't always translate into good films." She has given 1.5 rating out of 5.

Dhaval Roy, reviewing for The Times of India, has given a rating of 2.5 out of 5.
