= Ghaav: The Wound =

- Directed by: Kumar Jay
- Produced by: K.K. Nayyar
- Starring: Seema Biswas; Om Puri; Deepak Tijori; Pankaj Berry; Rahul Bhatt; Anant Jog; Govind Namdeo; Nandita Thakur; Mita Vasisht
- Cinematography: Nath Gupta
- Release date: 27 December 2002
- Running time: 150 mins.
- Country: India
- Language: Hindi

Ghaav: The Wound is a 2002 crime drama film directed by Kumar Jay. The main character of the film is Tanya (Seema Biswas).

== Music ==
1. "Aate Jaate Ye Hawa" - Kumar Sanu, Kavita Krishnamurthy
2. "Karle Mere Saath" - Bela Shende
3. "Kudiye Jawab Nahi" - Kumar Sanu, Sanjeevani
4. "Maane Ya Na Maane" - KK, Sapna Mukherjee
5. "Mere Jaisa Koi Nahi" - Jaspinder Narula, Arun Bakshi
6. "Zindagi Ek Banjaran" - Udit Narayan, Alka Yagnik
