= Sudhir Bhat =

- Born: 1951
- Died: 14 November 2013 (aged 61–62)
- Occupation: Producer
- Years active: 1985–2013

Sudhir Bhat was an Indian Marathi play producer. He was the founder member of the famous Theatre group "Suyog".

Bhat is one of the few commercially successful Marathi play producers. He showcased his plays for the Marathi diaspora in the United States. He continued with this project for around three decades, during which he produced over 80 plays, which accounted for 17,000 shows. Eight of his plays crossed the 1000-show mark. He holds the record for producing the highest number of plays in a career. His company went on to stage several box-office hits.

== Career ==
Bhat formed an organization named "Suyog" along with Gopal Algeri on 1 January 1985. He set an all-time record for producing the highest number of plays produced under one banner in Marathi theater. He came into the limelight with the play "Moruchi Mavashi". This was a major hit at that time. Vijay Chavan, Pradeep Patwardhan and Prashant Damle were some of the new actors produced in this play. He took the Marathi play outside India. His plays made shows in the UK, United States, and Europe and gained enormous popularity over there. High production values and the right marketing were key to his success. The Marathi theater industry saw a downturn in the year 1997. His plays in the US were a major boost during that time.

=== Criticism ===
He was also criticized by many for making too many business transactions in the Marathi play allocation dates. He made losses in many plays but he did not leave or change the business of producing the plays.

As the head of the Natya Nirmata Sangh (producers' association), he was the cynosure of many controversies. Many producers labeled him a 'contractor-producer', criticizing his repertoire of commercially successful actors, particularly the faces that he usually banked on. Those include Prashant Damle, Vikram Gokhale, Kavita Lad, Dilip Prabhavalkar. He was absolutely unapologetic about his brand of theatre.

He even drew flak for alleged unfair allotment of performance slots in Mumbai's select auditoriums. Many contemporaries called him dictatorial and alleged he had infused a commercial spirit in theatre. They accused him of using his clout to gain prime slots. However, Bhat maintained he stood for quality theatre, good marketing and high production values. He said his theatre was a box-set proscenium parameter, with no pretense of an experimental intent.

=== Successful person ===
Despite the barrage of criticism, his commercial success did bring a sparkle to Mumbai's theatre arts in the 90s, when none of the plays were doing well.

In spite of his economic orientation, Bhat deserves credit for some off-track plays that expanded the Marathi theatre cosmos. In 2003, he cast 75-year-old Shriram Lagoo in 'Mitra'. The play was about a resilient, ageing, upper caste widower, who befriends his female Dalit nurse, much to the indignation of his family. The play was stage 218 times, mostly to packed auditoriums. 'Mitra' received a rapturous response in places like Dubai. 'Gandhi Virudh Gandhi' was another bold attempt to portray the contentious relationship of Mahatma Gandhi and his son Harilal Gandhi.

But Bhat knew how to sell his plays. For instance, his production of PL Deshpande's life sketches 'Vyakti ani Valli' introduced the new generation to a masterpiece of humour. That the play banked on PL's glamour is a known fact.

== Death ==
On Thursday, 14 November 2013, he died of a heart attack at Hinduja hospital.

== Plays produced in Marathi ==
Sources:

1. Appa and Bappa अप्पा आणि बाप्पा,
2. Uduni ja pakhara उडुनी जा पाखरा,
3. Ekda pahava karun एकदा पहावं करून,
4. Eka lagnachi gosht एका लग्नाची गोष्ट - 1350 plays
5. Karayalo gelo ek करायला गेलो एक,
6. Kalam 302 कलम ३०२,
7. Kashi mi rahu ashi कशी मी राहू अशी,
8. Kashat kay laphdyat pay कश्यात काय लफड्यात पाय,
9. Kirvant किरवंत,
10. Gandhi viruddha Gandhi गांधी विरुद्ध गांधी,
11. Char diwas premache चार दिवस प्रेमाचे - 1012 plays
12. Javai maza bhala जावई माझा भला,
13. Zala ekdacha झालं एकदाचं,
14. Tarun Turk mhatare ark तरुण तुर्क म्हातारे अर्क,
15. Ti phulrani ती फुलराणी,
16. Dinuchya sasubai radhabai दिनूच्या सासूबाई राधाबाई,
17. Nishpap निष्पाप,
18. Pritisangam प्रीतिसंगम,
19. Prema tuza rang kasa प्रेमा तुझा रंग कसा,
20. Be lalna raja (Gujrathi) बे लालना राजा (गुजराथी),
21. Brahmchari ब्रह्मचारी,
22. Bhrmacha bhopla भ्रमाचा भोपळा,
23. Moruchi mavashi मोरूची मावशी - 2042 plays
24. Lagnachi bedi लग्नाची बेडी,
25. Wa guru वा गुरू!,
26. Vyakti ani valli व्यक्ती आणि वल्ली,
27. Shri tashi sou श्री तशी सौ,
28. Shrimant श्रीमंत,
29. Sandhyachhaya संध्याछाया,
30. Sundar mi honar सुंदर मी होणार,
31. Havaas maj tu हवास मज तू,
32. Hasat khelat हसत खेळत,
33. Hich tar premachi gammat aahe हीच तर प्रेमाची गम्मत आहे
34. Beiman बेईमान
