= Padatik (2024 film) =

2024 Indian Bengali-language film

- Theatrical release poster
- Directed by: Srijit Mukherji
- Written by: Srijit Mukherji
- Screenplay by: Srijit Mukherji
- Story by: Srijit Mukherji
- Based on: Mrinal Sen
- Produced by: Firdausul Hasan; Prabal Halder
- Starring: Chanchal Chowdhury; Monami Ghosh
- Cinematography: Indranath Marick
- Edited by: Srijit Mukherjee
- Music by: Salil Chowdhury; Rabindranath Tagore; Kabir Suman
- Production companies: Friends Communication, Big Screen Productions House
- Distributed by: PVR Inox Pictures
- Release date: 15 August 2024 (India)
- Running time: 126 Minutes
- Country: India
- Language: Bengali

Padatik is a 2024 Indian Bengali-language biographical drama film written, directed and edited by Srijit Mukherji. Produced by Firdausul Hasan and Prabal Halder under the banners of Friends Communication and Big Screen Productions, the film focuses on Mrinal Sen's active lifetime and his contribution in the Bengali Cinema. The film was released theatrically on 15 August 2024, India's Independence Day. At the 8th Filmfare Awards Bangla, it received fourteen nominations, of which won awards for Best Supporting Actress (Monami Ghosh), Best Make-up (Kundu), Best Production design (Tanmay Chakraborty) and Best Editing (Mukherji) and Best Screenplay (Mukherji).

== Plot ==
Mrinal Sen's journey from his struggling early days as an idealistic filmmaker during India's independence to his pivotal role in the Indian New Wave cinema movement in 1950s Calcutta, working alongside Satyajit Ray.

== Cast ==
- Chanchal Chowdhury – as Mrinal Sen
- Korak Samantha – as young Mrinal Sen
- Monami Ghosh – as Geeta Devi Wife of Mrinal Sen
- Aishani Dey – as young Geeta Sen
- Samrat Chakravarthy - as Mrinal and Geeta's only son Kunal Sen
- Barun Chanda as Jawaharlal Nehru, Prime Minister of India
- Jeetu Kamal - as Satyajit Ray
- Sujan Mukherjee - as Anjan Dutt
- Satrajit Sarkar - as Ritwik Ghatak
- Padmanabha Dasgupta - as Hemanta Mukherjee
- Rahul Deb Bose - as Amitabh Bachchan
- Gourab Roy Chowdhury - as Uttam Kumar
- Alokesh Bhattacharya - as Rabindranath Tagore
- Akshay Kapoor – as Kapoor
- Rohit Basfore
- Sajjadul Ahamed Riyad
- Tanisa Islam Mahi

== Create ==
Initially, Srijit decided to make a biopic on Mrinal Sen in the form of a web series, but later decided to make a film after changing his mind. The shooting of Mrinal Sen's biopic 'Padatik' began on 15 January 2023 in Kolkata.

== Reception ==
Padatik won the Best Screenplay award at the 2024 New York Indian Film Festival.
