= PAKT =

Pakt may refer to:

- Ketchikan International Airport, with airport code PAKT.
- Pakt (TV series), 2015-16 Polish TV series

== See also ==
- Pact (disambiguation)
