= Chaalchitro: The Frame Fatale =

Chaalchitro - The Frame Fatale
- Directed by: Pratim D. Gupta
- Written by: Pratim D. Gupta
- Screenplay by: Pratim D. Gupta
- Story by: Pratim D. Gupta
- Produced by: Firdausul Hasan; Prabal Halder
- Starring: Tota Roy Chowdhury; Shantanu Maheshwari; Swastika Dutta; Raima Sen; Anirban Chakrabarti; Indrajeet Bose; Priya Banerjee; Tanika Basu; Ziaul Faruq Apurba; Bratya Basu
- Cinematography: Turja Ghosh
- Edited by: Antara Lahiri
- Music by: Debojyoti Mishra
- Production company: Friends Communication
- Distributed by: PVR Inox Pictures
- Release date: 20 December 2024 (India)
- Running time: 124 Minutes
- Country: India
- Language: Bengali

Chaalchitro: The Frame Fatale is a 2024 Indian Bengali-language psychological action thriller film written and directed by Pratim D. Gupta. The film delves into the lives of four cops from Kolkata Police, as they go about investigating a series of murders rocking the city. As the plot thickens, the personal lives of the men get stressed and squeezed by the ongoing turmoil.

The film was released theatrically on 20 December 2024. It was then released on OTT platform Hoichoi on 21 February 2025. This movie is an unofficial remake of 2022's American movie Mindcage.

== Plot ==
Kanishka Chatterjee is a driven cop who doesn't hesitate to threaten or cajole to get things done. His relationship with wife Mili is quite rocky and he is haunted by a PTSD of discovering unutterable horror in the form of a series of murders that left an indelible mark on his psyche. As a fresh murder occurs, his fellow officer Naseer, well-experienced and soft-spoken, having an autistic daughter whose days are numbered, finds drastic similarities between the new one and those from the past. As he joins forces with junior officers Ritesh, a bright student, IIT, IPS topper, still adjusting with his new team and trying to overcome the language barrier, having a sweet Bengali girlfriend and Bishwa, who prefers to speak with his hands and feet instead of his mouth, who has found love in a North Kolkata brothel, it becomes apparent that the murderer has a theme in mind.

The movie opens with a young, unmarried woman named Sushmita getting killed alone in her flat. Kanishka finds out that her body was severely mutilated, dressed with a Banarasi sari and a tuberose garland, applied blood on her forehead and pinned to the wall, with a 'chaalchitro' (arch structure used behind the Durga idol during Durga Puja) structure made by the sofa frame. He was immediately reminded of a similar case twelve years ago, which completely changed him as a cop. However he completely nullified the chance of the killer starting to strike again as he was still under tough arrest. Naseer goes to Pavlov Hospital, where the killer was kept under mental therapies, and finds that he hasn't escaped anywhere. The four find out that the victim's marriage was called off five months ago due to the breakup of the couple, so they arrest the victim's boyfriend.

Meanwhile, Kanishka has a fight with his wife at home regarding priorities and work, Ritesh and his girlfriend Purabi chats about how Ritesh is facing problems to adjust with his seniors, who weren't half as qualified as him but yet pulled his leg as he was the youngest in the team, Bishwa and his love interest Joba, who is a prostitute in a North Kolkata brothel have sex and talk regarding how Joba wants to do lip and breast surgeries and Naseer promises his girl Putul who's suffering from cerebral palsy stage 4, that he would retire in six more months and start spending the entire day with his daughter. Kanishka and Ritesh interrogate the victim's boyfriend and try him to confess, but nevertheless Bishwa informs them that another murder just like this one has now been discovered. Kanishka lets the first victim's boyfriend go. The second murder was plotted in a Durga Puja pandal, where the victim Bidita was similarly pinned to the structure of the pandal, in front of a real 'chaalchitro' structure. Kanishka realizes that the series of murders has started again. He faints completely at the murder sight and becomes anxious after coming home and has nightmares. Ritesh and Bishwa insist Naseer to tell what the twelve-year-old case was and how it changed Kanishka. Naseer narrates the whole story to them.

Twelve years ago, some gruesome murders happened in the city where the killer had a similar modus operandi as the one now. He used to target women from all sorts of social stratums and killed them brutally, pinning them to a 'chaalchitro' structure. Kanishka could not get any lead in the case. He had arrested a person based on circumstantial evidence, but later it was found that he was actually innocent as the murders continued after his arrest. After 15 murders, the killer, Bhuban Halder, surrendered to the police on the day of 'Mahalaya'. He believed that he was a reincarnation of 'Mahishasura' (an evil force who was killed by Goddess Durga), and thus he was the evil force against the 15 victims. He surrendered after 15 murders as 'Mahishasura' also had to surrender to Goddess Durga after 15 days of war, on the day of 'Mahalaya'. This case completely changed Kanishka as a person. The killer was now under arrest in the Pavlov Mental Hospital.

Ritesh insists Kanishka to visit the old killer so that he can get some leads. Kanishka, initially hesitating, later went with Ritesh to Pavlov Hospital. Bhuban initially denied to say anything, and told them to bring biryani and chicken chaap the next time they come. Ritesh cleverly offers him a cigarette, to which he agrees to speak. He makes them notice that he dressed his victims with white saris with red borders and garlands made of hibiscus flowers, giving them a goddess-like attire. However, this killer is dressing his victims with Banarasi saris and tuberose garlands, applying blood on their forehead like vermillion, giving them a bridal attire. So, the killer wasn't copying the previous murders, but adapting the murders with a completely different motive. Kanishka later praises Ritesh for his smart move, as they have biryani, and bring shahi tukda for the other two policemen. The four cops are able to narrow down the victim profile as the victims were unmarried, lived alone, had their wedding called off due to breaking up with their fiancé. They start to search all wedding halls in the city as which weddings in the last six months were called off and run personal background checks of the possible victims. They narrow down to four victims.

Meanwhile, Ritesh pencil books a wedding hall to marry Purabi, Bishwa sees Joba having sex with another man and wants to settle with her to which Joba disagrees as she doesn't want to leave her work, Putul breaks down to Naseer as he couldn't give ample time to Putul, she tells that she wouldn't take long to move from cerebral palsy stage 4 to stage 5 and finally die, so she wants his father to be with her and doesn't want to let him go, Kanishka finds out that Mili is pregnant, but is now completely uninterested to be a father as when he wanted to be a father, Mili disagreed to have a baby and focused on her career. Kanishka tells Mili that he is out of this and all decisions would have to be taken by Mili herself. The four cops decide to secretly guard the four possible victims. One night, a tired Bishwa dozed off in his car, Ritesh made love to Purabi in phone and Naseer was talking to Putul in video call as Putul wanted him to take his day off the next day, to which he agrees and promises her that he would talk with Kanishka regarding this. He sees a suspicious man entering the possible victim's house. He follows him and enters the house. However, he can't reach either Bishwa or Ritesh. While he was calling Kanishka, he is hit on his head with a rod. Later we see that Kanishka reaches the spot the very morning and finds out that Naseer died due to a scuffle with the killer. He sees blood inside the room and the victim pinned to the wall in a similar attire, with a 'chaalchitro' structure made with books, as the curtains drop for interval.

Post-interval we see Kanishka totally depressed as he told Mili and Putul about this. Mili tried to rationalize the incident, while Putul completely broke down to the news. Purabi's parents were a little hesitant marrying their daughter with Ritesh learning about the incident. Ritesh blamed himself for not answering Naseer's call, while Bishwa wanted to rationalize this incident. This led to a quarrel between the two in a bar. Ritesh says foul about the police in his uniform there which was shot by someone and made viral to the media. Ritesh is suspended and his marriage is called off. Purabi's parents leave town in fear of facing media, leaving Purabi alone. The killer takes this very chance to kill Purabi, but is caught red-handed in a combat by Ritesh, however, he seemed to have an upper-hand.

During interrogation, the killer specifically wanted Kanishka to conduct the interrogation. The killer tells Kanishka that he had completely understood the trap that the police had orchestrated to catch him, but still gave in to it. It is then revealed that Ritesh's suspension from the force, his marriage getting called off, Purabi's getting alone was all part of a master plan so that Purabi matches the victim profile and the killer targets her only to get caught eventually. Now, the killer admits to confess, but not on record. Kanishka turns off the record. A new story unfolds.

The killer's father was a professor of English, who was an exceptional teacher. One day, a girl tried to seduce him in an elevator, but he scolded and insulted her in front of public. Vengefully, she went to Prof. Dutta's house. It is found that the son's wedding was next month, so his mother was out of home also for invitations. The student told his son (the killer) that Prof. Dutta had sent her to bring a file. She cleverly asks him for water, and in the meantime plants something inside his desk. Then, she leaves the house. Later, one of Prof. Dutta's students become one of the previous 'chaalchitro' victims. The police search Prof. Dutta's house only to find a packet that the student had previously planted, which was full of decorations of the 'chaalchitro' structure. Kanishka had arrested Prof. Dutta with circumstantial evidence when he was teaching Shakespeare's 'Hamlet' in a cemetery. Though it was found that Prof. Dutta was innocent, no one returned him his previous respect and saw him as a killer. His son's marriage also got called off. Prof. Dutta killed himself by hanging from a ceiling fan. Three months earlier than present the killer lost his mother. So, he had nothing to lose. He set out to kill unmarried women who lived alone (so that he could easily kill them) and whose marriages got called off due to breakup of the couple as a mode of revenge against the police, and specifically Kanishka.

Kanishka tried to make the killer understand it was not his fault. The killer told that he tried to reach him a lot of times but Kanishka was busy making a chargesheet in order to become a hero. His fault ruined seven lives. He told Kanishka that he had kidnapped his wife and kept her in such a place where she couldn't last long alive. He revealed that he was a student of mathematics, so he always tried to equate left and right. He had kidnapped his would-be wife's husband at Shimultala, Sonarpur Station Road. Kanishka will have to reach there, plant false evidence and arrest him for the murders just like the previous time, so that he could exact revenge from his would-be wife too. Only then he could save his own wife Mili, and his unborn baby. Kanishka tries to make the killer spill out where he had captured Mili by sending Ritesh in. Ritesh tried to make him understand by saying that Kanishka benefitted from Mili's death, but the killer smiled and understood the scheme again, and refused to tell anything. He raised his legs on the table. Kanishka saw soil stuck under shoes of the killer, and remembered the soil in the cemetery, where he had buried Naseer after his death. He went with his entire force to Park Street Cemetery. After a lot of digging, he found out a coffin that had a small piece of clothing sticking out of the box, which Kanishka identified to be Mili's. They took out the coffin and opened it, rescuing Mili who was sweating and used a lighter to survive inside. Kanishka hugged Mili.

Kanishka elaborated the entire incident in a press conference. Mili was admitted to a hospital. The doctor reported to Kanishka that though Mili had survived, her foetal breathing had stopped. So, they had to operate and abort the baby. Kanishka was shattered. Bishwa and Joba reconciled and had phuchka in front of a cinema hall. Purabi's parents agreed in her marriage with Ritesh, so though they couldn't hold it lavishly as they had to give up the wedding hall, they underwent a registry marriage and after that they danced together. Kanishka brought Mili home in a wheelchair and gave her a pleasant surprise. Though they had to abort the baby, Kanishka adopted Putul, who had no one to look after. Putul was delighted to see Kanishka and Mili together as her new parents. She immediately made friends with Mili, by saying, "Finally my wheelchair got a friend." Mili replied, "You too." They hugged each other. Kanishka and Ritesh danced together in bar, as they developed a very strong bond.

In the credits scene, it is shown that Bhuban Halder is eating biryani and chicken chaap in the interrogation room at Pavlov hospital. This might indicate that Kanishka had returned to Bhuban for some more information, thus hinting at a possible sequel.

== Cast ==
- Tota Roy Chowdhury as JCP Kanishka Chatterjee
- Raima Sen as Mili
- Anirban Chakrabarti as DCP Naseer
- Tanika Basu as Putul
- Shantanu Maheshwari as ACP Ritesh Kumar
- Indrajeet Bose as ACP Bishwa
- Priya Banerjee as Joba
- Swastika Dutta as Purabi
- Bratya Basu as Bhuban Halder (special appearance)
- Ziaul Faruq Apurba (extended cameo, voiced by Sudip Mukherjee)
- Lahoma Bhattacharya (guest appearance)

== Production ==
=== Casting and filming ===
Tota Roy Chowdhury was the first actor to be cast from the massive ensemble.

=== Sequel ===
The makers have officially announced that this film will come back with a sequel.

== Reception ==
=== Critical response ===
Chaalchitro - The Frame Fatale garnered widespread critical acclaim. The Times of India rated the film 4 out of 5 stars and called it a "must watch". OTTPlay praised the film's strong plot and called Chaalchitro "a gritty thriller".
