= Gautami Deshpande =

Indian actress, singer (2018-now)

- Born: 31 January 1993 (age 33); Pune, Maharashtra
- Education: Mechanical Engineer
- Occupations: Actress; singer
- Years active: 2018–present
- Known for: Saare Tujhyachsathi; Majha Hoshil Na
- Spouse: Swanand Tendulkar (m. 2023)
- Parents: Vivek Deshpande (father); Pratibha Deshpande (mother)
- Relatives: Mrunmayee Deshpande (sister)

Gautami Deshpande is an Indian television actress and singer. She is known for Sai in Majha Hoshil Na which is aired on Zee Marathi. She is the sister of Marathi actress Mrunmayee Deshpande.

== Early life and career ==
Gautami was born in Pune, Maharashtra on 31 January 1993. She completed her mechanical engineering degree in 2014 from VIIT Pune. After graduating, she worked in an Siemens IT firm, Pune for 4 years before working as an actor. She began her journey as an actor by working in theatre. She started doing it when she was in college. She made her debut in 2018 with Marathi daily soap Saare Tujhyachsathi which was aired on Sony Marathi. She is also a good singer. She has also sung for the Mann Fakiraa film. She appeared in Majha Hoshil Na as Sai.

== Filmography ==
=== Television ===
| Year | Title | Role | Channel | Ref. |
|---|---|---|---|---|
| 2018–2019 | Saare Tujhyachsathi | Shruti | Sony Marathi | |
| 2020–2021 | Majha Hoshil Na | Sai Shashikant Birajdar / Sai Aditya Kashyap | Zee Marathi | |
| 2021 | Chala Hawa Yeu Dya | Guest appearance | Zee Marathi | |
| 2022 | Kitchen Kallakar | Herself | Zee Marathi | |
| 2022 | D'verb Archives | Herself | YouTube | |

=== Music video ===
| Year | Title | Singer | Co-actor | Ref. |
|---|---|---|---|---|
| 2022 | Parijaat | Hrishikesh Ranade, Amita Ghugari | Virajas Kulkarni | |

== Discography ==
| Year | Movie | Song | Ref. |
|---|---|---|---|
| 2020 | Mann Fakiraa | Ghari Gondhal | |

== Plays ==
| Year | Role | Name of the Play |
|---|---|---|
| 2023 | Ila Kirloskar | Ghalib |
| 2024 | Ritika Khamkar | 2 vajun 22 minitani |

== Awards ==
| Year | Awards | Category | Works | Role | Ref. |
|---|---|---|---|---|---|
| 2019 | MA TA Sanmaan | Best Actress | Saare Tujhyachsathi | Shruti | |
| 2021 | Zee Marathi Utsav Natyancha Awards | Best Actress | Majha Hoshil Na | Sai Kashyap | |
| 2021 | Zee Marathi Utsav Natyancha Awards | Best Couple (Aditya-Sai) | Majha Hoshil Na | Sai Kashyap | |
| 2024 | MA TA Sanmaan | Best Actress | Ghalib | Ila | |
