= Pradeep Patwardhan =

Marathi actor and comedian (1970–2022)

- Born: 8 February 1958; Bombay, Bombay State, India
- Died: 9 August 2022 (aged 64); Mumbai, Maharashtra, India
- Years active: 1980–2022
- Spouse: Suvarna Rekha (div.)

Pradeep Shantaram Patwardhan (8 February 1958 – 9 August 2022) was an Indian actor and comedian who predominantly worked in the Marathi theatre.

His role in Marathi play Moruchi Mavshi led him to stardom. His well-known movies include Ek Full Chaar Half (1991), Jaml Ho Jaml (1995), Me Shivajiraje Bhosale Boltoy (2009), and Gola Berij (2012).

== Death ==
Patwardhan died on 9 August 2022 by cardiac arrest at the age of 64 at his residence in Zaobawadi Thakurdwar area of Girgaon, Mumbai. His last rites were carried out in Chandanwadi crematorium.

== Filmography ==
=== Marathi play ===
- Moruchi Mavshi (1985 onwards)

=== Film ===
Year	Title	Role	Notes
1991	Ek Full Chaar Half		Marathi
1995	Jaml Ho Jaml sukhi sansarachi bara sutre		Marathi
1995	Dance Party		Hindi
2004	Navra Maza Navsacha	Criminal Babu Kaalia	Marathi
2009	Me Shivajiraje Bhosale Boltoy		Marathi
2012	Gola Berij		Marathi
2013	Chaandi		Marathi
2015	Bombay Velvet		Hindi
2015	Holding Back		Hindi, short
2016	Police Line Ek Purna Satya		Marathi
2016	1234		Marathi
2017	Journey Premachi		Marathi
2023	Surya		Marathi

=== Television series ===
- Shwetambara (1983)
- Nasti Aafat (1989)
- Sukhachya Sarini He Man Baware
- Maharashtrachi Hasyajatra
- Gharakul

== See also ==
- List of Indian actors
- List of Indian comedians
- List of people from Mumbai
