= PACT (interaction design) =

User interaction analysis

In interaction design, PACT (an acronym for People, Activities, Contexts, Technologies) is a structure used to analyse with whom, what and where a user interacts with a user interface. Interaction is considered, in this framework, as a relationship between people, activities, contexts, and technologies.

To analyze a user experience (UX) design using PACT, a designer must scope out the possible variety of people, activities, contexts, and technologies in a domain through brainstorming or envisionment techniques. PACT also focuses on three categories for mapping people differences: physical differences, psychological differences, and social differences.
