= The Cloud and the Man =

- Theatrical release poster
- মানিকবাবুর মেঘ
- Directed by: Abhinandan Banerjee
- Written by: Abhinandan Banerjee
- Produced by: Bauddhayan Mukherji; Monalisa Mukherji
- Starring: Chandan Sen; Debesh Roychowdhury; Bratya Basu; Nimai Ghosh
- Cinematography: Anup Singh
- Edited by: Abhro Banerjee
- Music by: Subhajit Mukherjee
- Production company: Little Lamb Films
- Release dates: 2021 (Tallinn Black Nights); 12 July 2024 (West Bengal)
- Running time: 97 Minutes
- Country: India
- Language: Bengali

The Cloud and the Man (also known as Manikbabur Megh) is a 2024 Indian Bengali-language drama film directed by debutant director Abhinandan Banerjee and produced by Buaddhayan and Monalisa Mukherji. Actor Chandan Sen who portrayed the title role bagged the Best Actor Award at the 19th Pacific Meridian Film Festival, Russia. The film got selection at the 2nd Eikhoigi Imphal International Film Festival 2025 under the Eikhoigi Montage section.

== Cast ==
- Chandan Sen as Manik Babu
- Debesh Roychowdhury as Kali
- Bratya Basu as Dr. Sadhan
- Nimai Ghosh as Madhab
- Arun Guhatharkurta
- Arya Mallick

== Plot ==
Using monochrome cinematography, the film follows Manik Babu, a recently bereaved middle-aged man who believes a cloud is following him. He is initially frightened by the cloud but later develops a bond with it. The DMovies review says this relationship eases his isolation and loneliness. Hyperallergic describes the relationship as bringing out a new side of Manik and taking him through experiences of faith, betrayal, belief, and warmth.

== Release ==
The film released in theaters in West Bengal on 12 July 2024.

== Awards and nominations ==
It had its world premiere at the Tallinn Black Nights Film Festival where it opened the First Feature competition in Nov 2021. The Indian Premiere was at IFFI, Goa and the North American Premiere took place at the Santa Barbara International Film Festival.

The film finds place in the coveted list of FIPRESCI India's Top 10 Films of 2021 and has won the NETPAC award for the Best Asian Film at the 27th Kolkata International Film Festival, 2022. It also bagged the Chidananda Dasgupta Award and a citation for a feature film by a debut director for the 2nd year of the Chidananda Dasgupta Centenary Awards.the Best Actor Award at the 19th Pacific Meridian Film Festival, Russia.
