= PACT Act =

PACT Act may refer to:

- The Prevent All Cigarette Trafficking (PACT) Act of 2009, an act of the 111th United States Congress
- The Preventing Animal Cruelty and Torture (PACT) Act, a United States animal welfare act of the 116th United States Congress
- The Honoring our Promise to Address Comprehensive Toxics (PACT) Act of 2022, a United States veterans healthcare act of 117th United States Congress
