= Yeoor =

Tourist destination in Thane, Maharashtra, India

Yeoor is a locality in Thane city of Maharashtra state in India. Situated in the Sanjay Gandhi National Park, it is known for its panthers and wildlife and is popularly known as "Mumbai's National Park".

Yeoor has 6 villages, and houses a population of around 3000. There are bungalows owned by the wealthy and ministers.

An Indian Air Force station is also located in the area. Access to the area is tightly controlled by the Forest Department, and no vehicles are permitted to enter after 20:00 hours.

The clean atmosphere is the main attraction of these hills, and has converted it into a perfect tourist spot for the people of Thane. People also come for morning walk and enjoy the pleasant atmosphere.

According to forest department data from an annual wildlife census conducted in the Yeoor range of Sanjay Gandhi National Park, confirmed sightings of several animals at eight designated spots, but none of the estimated 55 leopards were seen during the 12-hour period. The overall decline from 152 animal sightings in 2024 to just 61 in 2025 has raised concerns among wildlife enthusiasts regarding human activity in eco-sensitive zones and the accuracy of census methods.

== People ==
The population literacy is low, but improving with time. The people living and working in Yeoor come from many different linguistic groups of India.

Since the majority of the village population comprises Adivasis, cutting wood and selling regional fruits is the main source of income. The lowest possible income in one of these villages could be in the range of Rs. 4000 to Rs. 6000 per annum. Also growing rice and fishing (in the small dam nearby) are the other occupations of the villagers.

== Infrastructure ==
The area also has road access with the general transportation being bus, auto rickshaws and private vehicles. The local village is quite under-developed with no electricity in the last 2 villages. Also the area has Municipal School with classes up to 9th grade. There are proper sanitation facilities in the village. There are hospitals in the village area but not modern. For treatment, the people have to come down to the Vartak-Nagar area (downhill) which is a proper town and a host to many reputed residential complexes.

== Trees ==
In Yeoor there are trees like bamboo, mango, Ecocrop, terminalia, Red Pine, Bauhinia, Amla, Vine, Nilgiri, Blackcurrant, Tamarind, Turmeric, Lotus, jackfruit, Almond. Names in Marathi Local Language Moh, Palas, Pangara, Lokhandi, Khair, Bahava, Katesavar, Dev savar, Shirish, Ain, Kunbhi, Arjun, Petari, Papadi, Kusum & Karanj.
