= Mangesh Kadam =

Director

- Born: Mumbai, India
- Occupations: Actor and director

Mangesh Kadam is a Marathi movie and play director from Maharashtra, India.

== Plays as director ==
- Jadoo Teri Nazar (2007)
- Soor Rahu De
- Govind ghya, koni Gopal Ghya - ‘गोविंद घ्या, कुणी गोपाळ घ्या’
- Moruchi Mavshi - 'मोरुची मावशी'

== Play as actor ==
- Hich tar premachi gammat ahe - 'हीच तर प्रेमाची गंमत आहे'
- Goshta tashi gamtishi - 'गोष्ट तशी गमतीची'
- Asa mi Assami - 'असा मी असामी'
- Aamne Saamne

== Personal life ==
Kadam is a balanced person in professional life. He is married to Marathi Play actress Leena Bhagwat.

== Accolades ==
- Zee Natya Gaurav Award 2015
- Akhil Bhartiy Natya Parishad - Special prize
