= Prashant Damle =

Indian actor (born 1961)

- Born: 5 April 1961 (age 65); Mumbai
- Education: Raja Shivaji Vidyalaya
- Occupations: Actor, comedian
- Years active: 1978–present
- Spouse: Gauri Damle (m. 1985)
- Honours: Limca Book of Records (1983, 1995, 1995, 1996, 2001); Sangeet Natak Akademi Award (2020)
- Website: prashantdamle.com

Prashant Damle (born 5 April 1961) is an Indian actor and comedian who has acted in numerous Marathi dramas, films and soap operas. He has been associated with Marathi theatre since 1983 and till date has performed in 27 different plays and a variety of roles and is a widely recognized star of Marathi theatre.

He has 5 Limca Book of Records in his name. He has also performed in 37 Marathi feature films and 24 Marathi television serials. On 6 November 2022, his performance in Eka Lagnachi Pudhchi Goshta marked his career's 12,500th show, a record.

== Career ==
After the first few stage performances during his school years and college years he got an opportunity to act in the Marathi play named "Tur Tur". That proved to be a major breakthrough for him and thus he ventured into the commercial Marathi theatre. He proved his excellence in comedy. Then followed the play "Moruchi Mavshi". During that period of struggle Mr. Sudhir Bhat of Suyog Productions, cast him into a lead role in his comedy-drama "Bramhachari". That was what gave birth to his devotion and dedication to the world of Marathi theater & entertainment. He got his first break into films through the film "Pudhcha Paaul" by Producer Mr. Vinay Nevalkar which was directed by Mr. Raj Dutt and thus marked his first entry into the world of Marathi films, where his performance and name reached to a larger audience.

Prashant has also worked in the film media. He has worked in numerous television serials and more than a hundred Marathi films. He has worked in Pasant Aahe Mulagi, Savat Majhi Ladki, Ekda Pahava Karun, Aatmavishwas, Ena Meena Deeka (along with Ashok Saraf), Madhuchandrachi Ratra, Vajwa Re Vajwa and the most recent Tu Tithe Mee.

He has acted in many Marathi and Hindi television serials. Some of his works in television are "Gharkul", "Be Dune Teen", "Bhikajirao Crorepati", "Gubbare", "Saare Saare Gaauya", "Kay Pahilas Majhyat", "Darling Darling", "Bahurupi", "Filmi Chakkar", and "Uchapati".

Damle suffered a mild heart attack in May 2013. He was undergoing treatment at an Andheri hospital. Damle was admitted to the Critical H4 hospital after feeling uneasy. Angiography revealed four blockages in arteries supplying blood to his heart which was operated the same week. Damle was busy with "Eka Lagnachi Goshta" when he had this mild heart attack. Because of this, all shows of his dramas had to be cancelled for the next 15 days. After the treatment, he again started doing plays but at a slower pace.

== Other activities ==
He is doing a cookery show called as Aaj Kay Special on Colors Marathi. He also works as a brand ambassador for Disha Direct, Shamrao Vitthal Co-op. Bank Ltd. and of Retired Army Association. His TV Show Aamhi Saare Khavayye on Zee Marathi brings its audience, a set of delicious recipes. The show also gives the audience an opportunity to participate. Theme menus cater to all possible situations such as a weekend lunch menu, a party or whatever. One can learn to make starters, drinks, main course items as well as desserts on the show.

== Prashant Damle Fan Foundation ==
He started his own foundation called Prashant fan foundation through which he carries on his social work for the welfare of the society. He has also donated Rs 1 lakh for the water program of Maharashtra Govt.

== Theatre ==
- Tur Tur
- Maharastrachi Lokdhara
- Moruchi Mavshi
- Brahmachari
- Lagnachi Bedi
- Priti Sangam
- Pahuna
- Chal... Kahitarich Kay
- Gela Madhav Kunikade
- Lekure Udand Jhali
- Priyatama
- Be Dune Teen
- Char Divas Premache
- Shh... Kuthe Bolayche Nahi
- Wyakti Ani Walli
- Sundar Me Honaar
- Sasu Majhi Dhasu
- Eka Lagnachi Goshta
- Aamhi Doghe Raja Rani
- Jaadu Teri Najar
- Bahurupi
- Nakalat Disale Saare
- Karti Kaljat Ghusali
- Sangeet Sanshaykallol
- Sakhar Khalella Manus
- Eka Lagnachi Pudhachi Ghoshta
- Sarkha Kahitari Hotay
- Shikayla Gelo Ek

He has completed his 11,000+ drama shows as of March, 2022

== Filmography ==
- Mu. Po. Bombilwaadi (2025) as Hitler
- Mumbai Pune Mumbai 3 (2018) - Shekhar Pradhan (Gautam's father)
- Mumbai-Pune-Mumbai 2 (2015) - Shekhar Pradhan (Gautam's father)
- Bho Bho (2016)
- Welcome Zindagi (2015)
- Gola Berij (2012)
- Tu Tithe Mee (1998)
- Akka (1995)
- Yadnya (1994)
- Chal Gammat Karu (1994)
- Gharandaj (1993)
- Premankur (1993)
- Garam Masala (1993)
- Sarech Sajjan (1993)
- Savat Mazi Ladki (1993) - Dr. Dinesh Kirtikar
- Char Divas Sasuche (1993)
- Bedardi (1993)
- Vajwa Re Vajwa (1992)
- Sagle Sarkech (1992)
- Ek Gaganbhedi Kinkkali (1992)
- Aikava Te Nawalach (1992)
- Aapli Manase (1992)
- Khulyacha Bajar (1992)
- Aayatya Gharat Gharoba (1991) - Ajay Sarpotdar
- Atta Hoti Geli Kuthe (1991)
- Dhadakmar (1991)
- Bandalbaaj (1991)
- Dhumakul (1990)
- Fatfajiti (1990)
- Baap Re Baap (1990)
- Atmavishwas (1989) - Abhay Mangalkar
- Pasant Aahe Mulgi (1989)
- Ek Ratra Mantarleli (1989)
- Eena Meena Deeka (1989)
- Vidhilikhit (1989)
- Aai Pahije (1988)
- Reshim Gaathi (1988)
- Saglikade Bombabomb (1989)
- Anandi Anand (1987)
- Olakh Na Palakh
- Pudhcha Paaul

== Television ==
- Kay Pahilas Majhyat
- Be Dune Paach
- Uchapati
- Ek Rupayachi Paij (DD Sahyadri)
- Bhikaji Rao Crorepati (DD Sahyadri)
- Hat Leka (Zee Marathi)
- Aamchyasarkhe Aamhich (Zee Marathi)
- Chandrakant Chiplunkar Seedi Bambawala (Sony SAB)

== Reality Shows ==
- Aamhi Saare Khavayye (Zee Marathi)
- Sa Re Ga Ma Pa Season 11 (Zee Marathi)
- Sahyadri Antakshari
- Tak Dhi Naa Dhin
- Aaj Kay special Season 1 (Colors Marathi)
- Singing Star (Sony Marathi)
- Kitchen Kallakar (Zee Marathi)

== Awards received ==
=== Stage ===
- 1993: Best Actor, Natya Nirmata Sangh, Gela Madhav Kunikade
- 1993: Best Actor, Natydarpan award, Gela Madhav Kunikade
- 1993: Best Actor, Maharashtra State Award, Gela Madhav Kunikade
- 1995: Best Singer/Actor - 1995 - Kalnirnay, Lekure Udand Jhali
- 1995: Best Singer/Actor - 1995 - Akhil Bhartiya Natya Parishad, Lekure Udand Jhali
- 1995: Best Actor, Maharashtra State Award, Lekure Udand Jhali
- 1995: Best Actor, Critics Award, Lekure Udand Jhali
- 1996: Record Breaker Actor, a special prize by Prabhat channel
- 1996: Best Actor, Natyadarpan Award, Priyatama
- 1999: Best Actor, Natya Nirmata Sangh, Eka Lagnachi Gosht
- 1999: Best Actor, ALFA Gaurav Puraskar, Eka Lagnachi Gosht
- 1999: Best Actor, Akhil Bhartiya Natya Parishad, Eka Lagnachi Gosht
- 1999: Best Actor, Maharashtra State Award, Eka Lagnachi Gosht
- 2003: Best Actor, Kalaranjan Puraskar, pune, Amhi Doghe Raja Rani
- 2003: Best Actor, Maharashtra State Award, Amhi Doghe Raja Rani
- 2008: Best Actor, Maharashtra State Award, Olakh Na Palakh
- 2010: Best Actor, Maharashtra State Award, Bahurupi
- 2019: Best Actor, Lokmat Maharashtrian Of The Year, Eka Lagnachi Pudhchi Ghost
- 2025: Best Comedy Actor, Akhil Bharatiya Marathi Natya Parishad, Shikayla Gelo Ek

=== Film ===
- 1993: Best Actor in a Supporting Role, Maharashtra State Award, Sawat Majhi Ladki

=== Limca Records ===
- Crossed the mark of 10,700 shows from 23 Feb 1983 till date
- Performed 5 shows of 3 different plays in one day on 18 Jan 2001
- Performed 469 shows in 365 Days from 1 Jan. 1996 to 31 Dec. 1996
- Performed 452 shows in 365 Days from 1 Jan. 1995 to 31 Dec. 1995
- Performed 4 shows of 3 different plays in one day on 24 Dec. 1995
