= List of artistic depictions of Mahatma Gandhi =

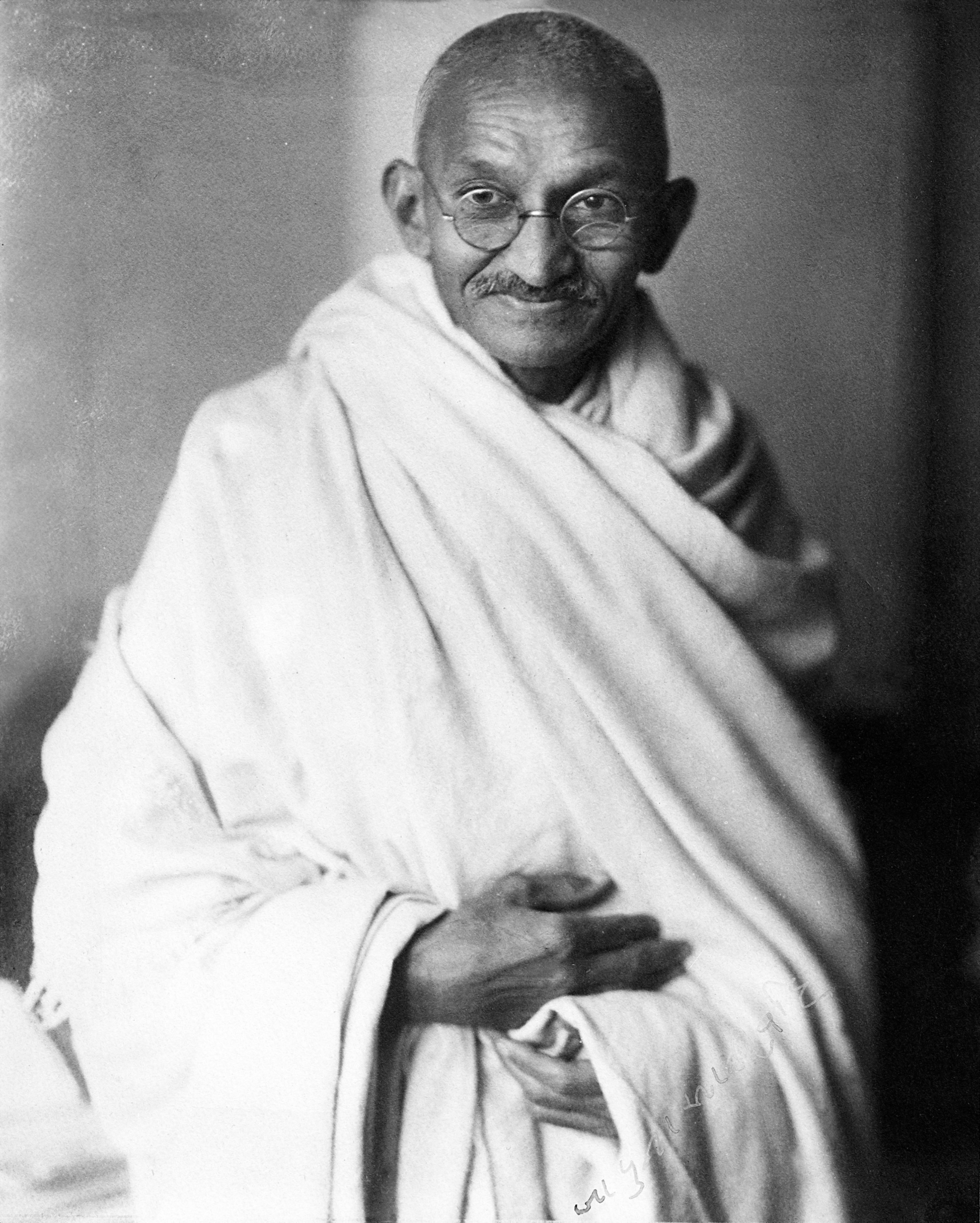
Mahatma Gandhi as photographed in London in 1931

Mohandas Karamchand Gandhi was a key Indian independence movement leader known for employing nonviolent resistance against British Rule to successfully lead the campaign. He was the pioneer of Satyagraha — the resistance of alleged tyranny through mass civil disobedience, firmly founded upon ahimsa or total nonviolence — which inspired movements for civil rights and freedom around the world. Gandhi is commonly known in India and around the world with the honorific Mahatma Gandhi (Sanskrit: महात्मा mahātmā — "Great Soul") and as Bapu (Gujarati: બાપુ bāpu — "Father"). In India, he is recognised as the Father of the Nation by all Indians and 2 October, his birthday, is commemorated each year on Gandhi Jayanti, a national holiday.

== Currency and stamps ==
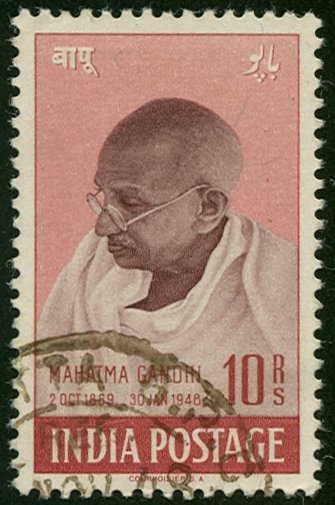
The Mahatma Gandhi 10 rupees stamp

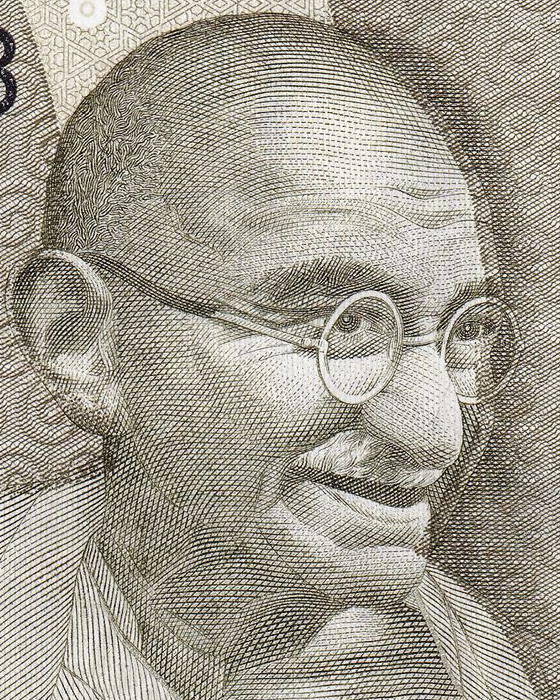
Gandhi on the front of a 500 Rupee note

In 1996, the Government of India introduced the Mahatma Gandhi series of currency notes in rupees 5, 10, 20, 50, 100, 500 and 1000 denomination. Today, all the currency notes in circulation in India contain a portrait of Mahatma Gandhi. In 1969, the United Kingdom issued a series of stamps commemorating the centenary of Mahatma Gandhi.

There have been approximately 250 stamps issued bearing Gandhi's image from 80 different countries worldwide.

== Film ==
- 1953: He is the subject of the American feature documentary Mahatma Gandhi: 20th Century Prophet.
- 1963: Gandhi is portrayed by J.S. Casshyap in Nine Hours to Rama based upon the 1962 book by Stanley Wolpert.
- 1968: Mahatma: Life of Gandhi, 1869–1948 (5 hour long documentary on the life of Gandhi), made by Vithalbhai Jhaveri.
- 1982: Gandhi is portrayed by Ben Kingsley in the award-winning film, Gandhi, directed by Richard Attenborough. The film won eight Academy Awards, including Best Picture and Best Actor. It was adapted from the biography by Louis Fischer.
- 1986: Gandhi is portrayed by Sam Dastor in Lord Mountbatten: The Last Viceroy, a British mini-series which is about Louis Mountbatten and his role in the partitioning of India and Pakistan.
- 1989: Gandhi is portrayed by Jay Levey in a spoof segment in UHF, a comedy film directed by Levey himself.
- 1993: Gandhi is portrayed by Yashwant Satvik in Yugpurush Dr. Babasaheb Ambedkar, which is based upon the life of B. R. Ambedkar.
- 1993: Gandhi is portrayed by Annu Kapoor in the Ketan Mehta film Sardar which is about the life of Sardar Vallabhbhai Patel.
- 1996: Gandhi is portrayed by Rajit Kapur in his award-winning role as a young Gandhi in The Making of the Mahatma, a Shyam Benegal film about Gandhi's 21 years in South Africa.
- 1998: Gandhi is portrayed by Sam Dastor in Jinnah, a biopic of the founder of Pakistan, Mohammed Ali Jinnah.
- 2000: Gandhi is portrayed by Mohan Gokhale in Dr. Babasaheb Ambedkar, which is based upon the life of B. R. Ambedkar.
- 2000: Gandhi is portrayed by Naseeruddin Shah in Hey Ram. A film made by Kamal Haasan, it portrays a would-be assassin of Gandhi and the dilemma faced by the would-be assassins in the turmoil of post-partition India.
- 2001: Gandhi is portrayed by Surendra Rajan in the film Veer Savarkar, about the life of Vinayak Damodar Savarkar.
- 2002: Gandhi is portrayed by Surendra Rajan in the film The Legend of Bhagat Singh, a historical biographical film about the Indian freedom fighter Bhagat Singh.
- 2004: Swades, "epitomizes Gandhi's values" according to his great-grandson, Tushar Gandhi. The protagonist is called Mohan (Bhargava) which is Gandhi's birth name (Mohandas). The film is about a young NRI returning to India to help the country and its people, a tale similar to that of Gandhi's life.
- 2005: Gandhi is portrayed by Mohan Jhangiani (actor) and Zul Vilani (voice) who appears briefly in the film Water (the film was also turned into the book, Water: A Novel, by Bapsi Sidhwa).
- 2005: Mangal Pandey: The Rising, ends with newsreel footage featuring Gandhi.
- 2005: Surendra Rajan portrays Gandhi in Shyam Benegal's biopic Netaji Subhas Chandra Bose: The Forgotten Hero.
- 2005: Maine Gandhi Ko Nahin Mara, tells the story of a retired Hindi professor, who, as he falls victim to dementia, begins to believe that he was accused of being the man who assassinated Mahatma Gandhi.
- 2006: The image of Gandhi is portrayed by Dilip Prabhavalkar in the award-winning film Lage Raho Munna Bhai. It stars Sanjay Dutt as Munna Bhai and popularised the new term Gandhigiri in India.
- 2007: Gandhi is portrayed by Darshan Jariwala in Gandhi, My Father.
- 2007: The image of Gandhi is reprised by Dilip Prabhavalkar in Shankar Dada Zindabad, the Telugu language remake of Lage Raho Munna Bhai.
- 2009: Mahatma reflects on Gandhian values.
- 2009: Road to Sangam tells the story of a devout Muslim mechanic named Hasmat Ullah (Paresh Rawal) who has been entrusted the job of repairing an old V8 ford engine, not knowing the historic significance that it once carried Gandhi's ashes which were immersed in the holy Triveni Sangam.
- 2011: Gandhi is portrayed by Avijit Dutt in Dear Friend Hitler, a drama film based on letters written by Mohandas Gandhi to Nazi Party leader and Chancellor of Germany Adolf Hitler during World War II.
- 2011: Koormavatara, a Kannada film by Girish Kasaravalli revolves around a government employee cast in a play to portray Mahatma Gandhi, who, on course, realizes that playing Gandhi is easier than imbibing and implementing his principles in real-life. Scholar Dr. Shikaripura Krishnamurthy essayed the role of government employee.
- 2012: Welcome Back Gandhi (also known as Mudhalvar Mahatma), directed by A. Balakrishnan and starring S. Kanagaraj as Gandhi, portrays the impact Gandhi would have if he returned to present day India.
- 2016: Gandhigiri talks about Gandhi's values in today's world.
- 2017: Viceroy's House, a British-Indian historical drama film directed by Gurinder Chadha, about the period leading up to the Partition of India under Viceroy Lord Mountbatten. Gandhi is portrayed by Neeraj Kabi.
- 2017: Kamlesh portrayed Gandhi in historical drama film Firangi.
- 2019: Gandhi is portrayed by Surendra Rajan in the Bengali film Gumnaami based on the Mukherjee Commission Hearings, which deals with three possible theories about the death of Subhas Chandra Bose.
- 2019: Gandhi is portrayed by Jesus Sans in The Gandhi Murder, a conspiracy theory film based on the assassination of Mahatma Gandhi
- 2023: Deepak Antani portrayed Gandhi in Gandhi Godse – Ek Yudh, the film deals with a fictional situation in which Gandhi survives his assassination.
- 2023: Gandhi is portrayed by Deepak Antani in Mujib: The Making of a Nation, a biopic of the founder of Bangladesh, Sheikh Mujibur Rahman.
- 2024: Gandhi is portrayed by Rajesh Khera in Swayantrya Veer Savarkar, a biopic on Vinayak Damodar Savarkar.

== Literature ==
- "The Last Article" (1988) by Harry Turtledove, an alternate history novella of a German victory in World War II, has Gandhi as the primary third-person narrator.
- "Soldier of the Queen" by Barbara Hambly in "War of the Worlds: Global Dispatches (1996), an alternate history and science fiction anthology set in an alternate universe where the Martian alien invasion of Earth depicted in "The War of the Worlds" (1898) by H. G. Wells actually happened in the year that the novel was published. As with the other stories in the anthology, it deals with celebrities of the time (in this case Gandhi and author Rudyard Kipling) and how they dealt with the Martian invasion of their locality. India was invaded but the Martians were defeated worldwide. The Martians also invaded Britain (which was what happened in the original H. G. Wells novel) and Gandhi takes advantage of the turmoil in Britain by declaring Indian independence 50 years early (in 1898 instead of 1948).

== Memorials, paintings, sculptures, and statues ==
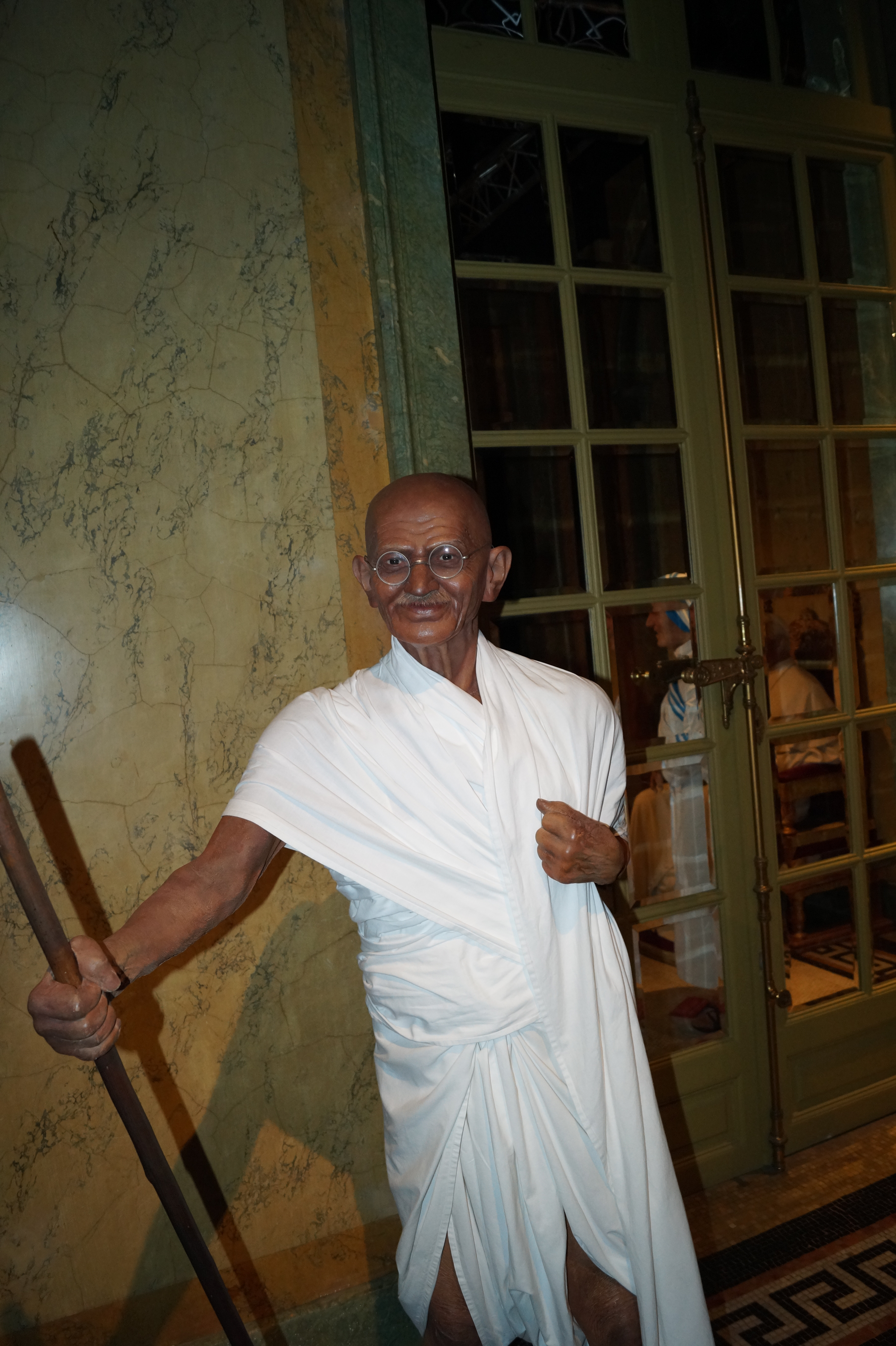
Mahatma Gandhi wax statue

There have been numerous memorials to Mohandas Karamchand Gandhi. In New Delhi, Gandhi Smriti, or Birla House, the home of Ghanshyam Das Birla, where Gandhi was assassinated on 30 January 1948, was acquired by the Government of India in 1971 and opened to the public in 1973 as the Gandhi Smriti or "Gandhi Remembrance". It preserves the room where Mahatma Gandhi lived the last four months of his life and the grounds where he was shot while holding his nightly public walk. A Martyr's Column now marks the place where Mohandas Gandhi was assassinated.

In 1988, India donated a bust of Gandhi to the city of Burgos, Spain, which is located in a park. The city of Pietermaritzburg, South Africa—where Gandhi was ejected from a first-class train in 1893—now hosts a commemorative statue that was unveiled during the 2003 Cricket World Cup by the Indian team led by captain Saurav Ganguly. In the United Kingdom, there are several prominent statues of Gandhi, most notably two in London: one in Tavistock Square near University College London where he studied law, and another in Parliament Square and Statue of Mahatma Gandhi, Golden Mile in Belgrave. 30 January is commemorated in the United Kingdom as the "National Gandhi Remembrance Day."

In the United States, there is a statue of Gandhi outside the Union Square Park in New York City, and the Martin Luther King, Jr. National Historic Site in Atlanta, and a Mahatma Gandhi Memorial on Massachusetts Avenue in Washington, D.C., near the Indian Embassy. There is a Gandhi statue in San Francisco Embarcadero Neighborhood. In 2009, a statue of Gandhi was installed outside the Bellevue Library in Washington state. There are wax statues of Gandhi at the Madame Tussaud's wax museums in London, New York, and other cities around the world.

Józef Gosławski designed a caricature of Mohandas Karamchand Gandhi in 1932, which was cast in bronze in 2007.

Gandhi's Three Monkeys is a series of sculptures created by Indian artist Subodh Gupta. The sculptures recall a visual metaphor from Gandhi, of the "Three wise monkeys", representing the principle "see no evil, hear no evil, speak no evil".

In 2010, realist painter Gopal Swami Khetanchi depicted Gandhi's dream of an independent India in his exhibition titled Gandhigiri. The exhibition displayed twenty-one artworks depicting an elderly Gandhi with other elements and figures complementing or countering the discourse.

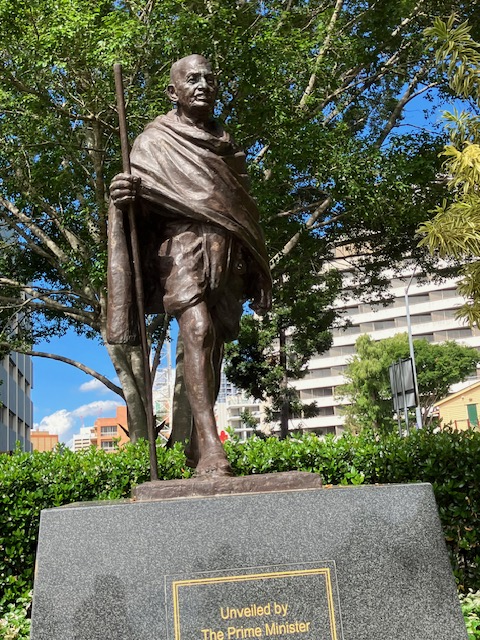
Statue of M.K. Gandhi, Roma Street Parklands, Brisbane, 2024

In Australia, the Indian community of Brisbane commissioned a statue of Gandhi, created by Ram V. Sutar and Anil Sutar in the Roma Street Parkland. It was unveiled In 2014, by Narendra Modi, then Prime Minister of India.

On 22 November 2018, President of India Ramnath Kovind unveiled a statue of Mahatma Gandhi in Parramatta, Sydney, Australia.

In 2018, a statue of Gandhi at the University of Ghana, erected in 2016, was removed, "after protests from students and faculty who argue the Indian independence leader considered Africans 'inferior'.... Campaigners in Malawi are trying to stop another Gandhi statue from being erected in the capital Blantyre."

In 2019, the fifth statue of Gandhi in the United Kingdom was unveiled at Manchester Cathedral. The statue weighing 800 kg and measuring 9 feet was a gift from Shrimad Rajchandra Mission Dharampur, a worldwide spiritual organization. It was unveiled by the mayor of Manchester and Pujya Gurudevshri Rakeshbhai along with several guests as a symbol of peace and compassion, following the 2017 terror attack at Manchester Arena.

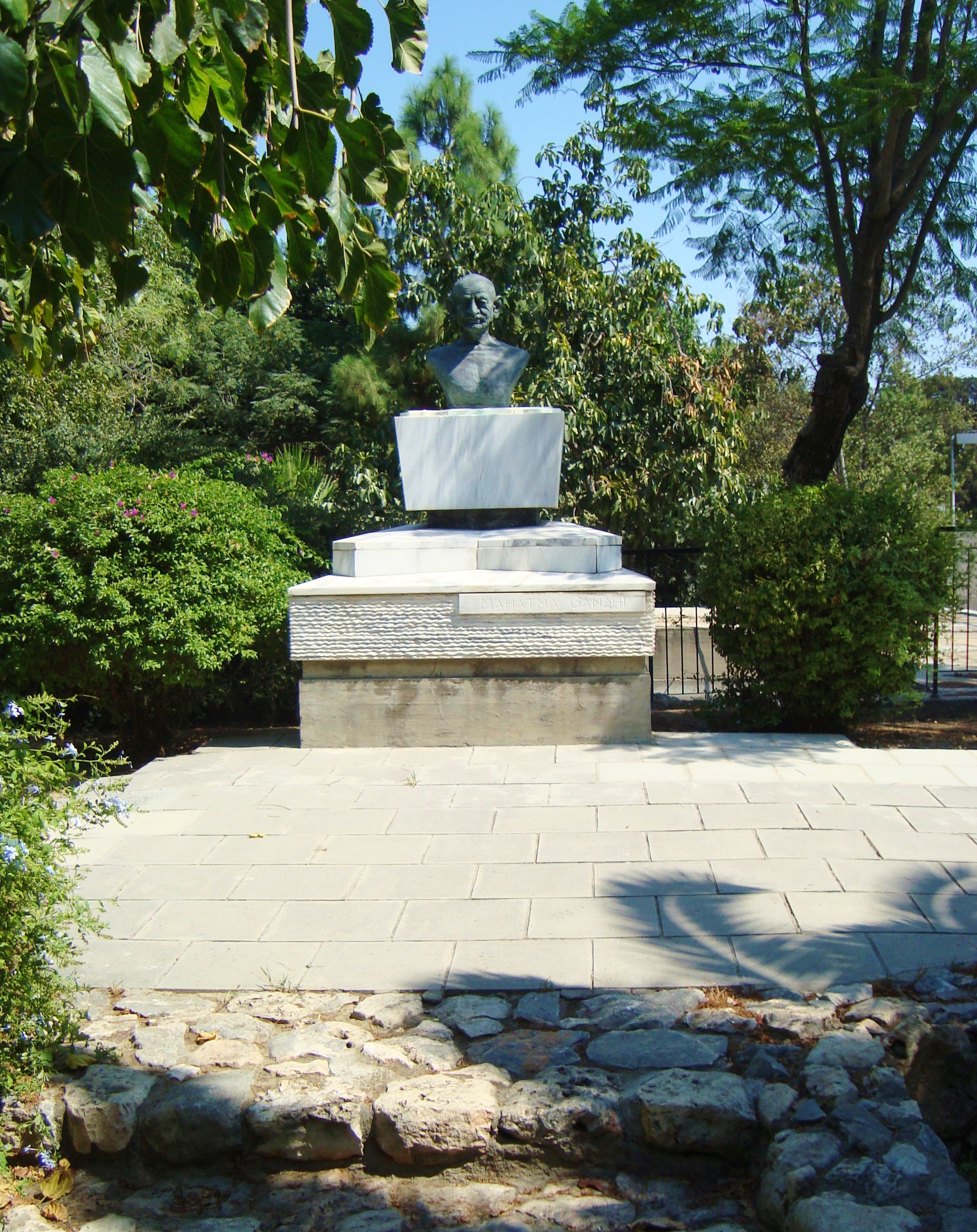
Nicosia, Cyprus

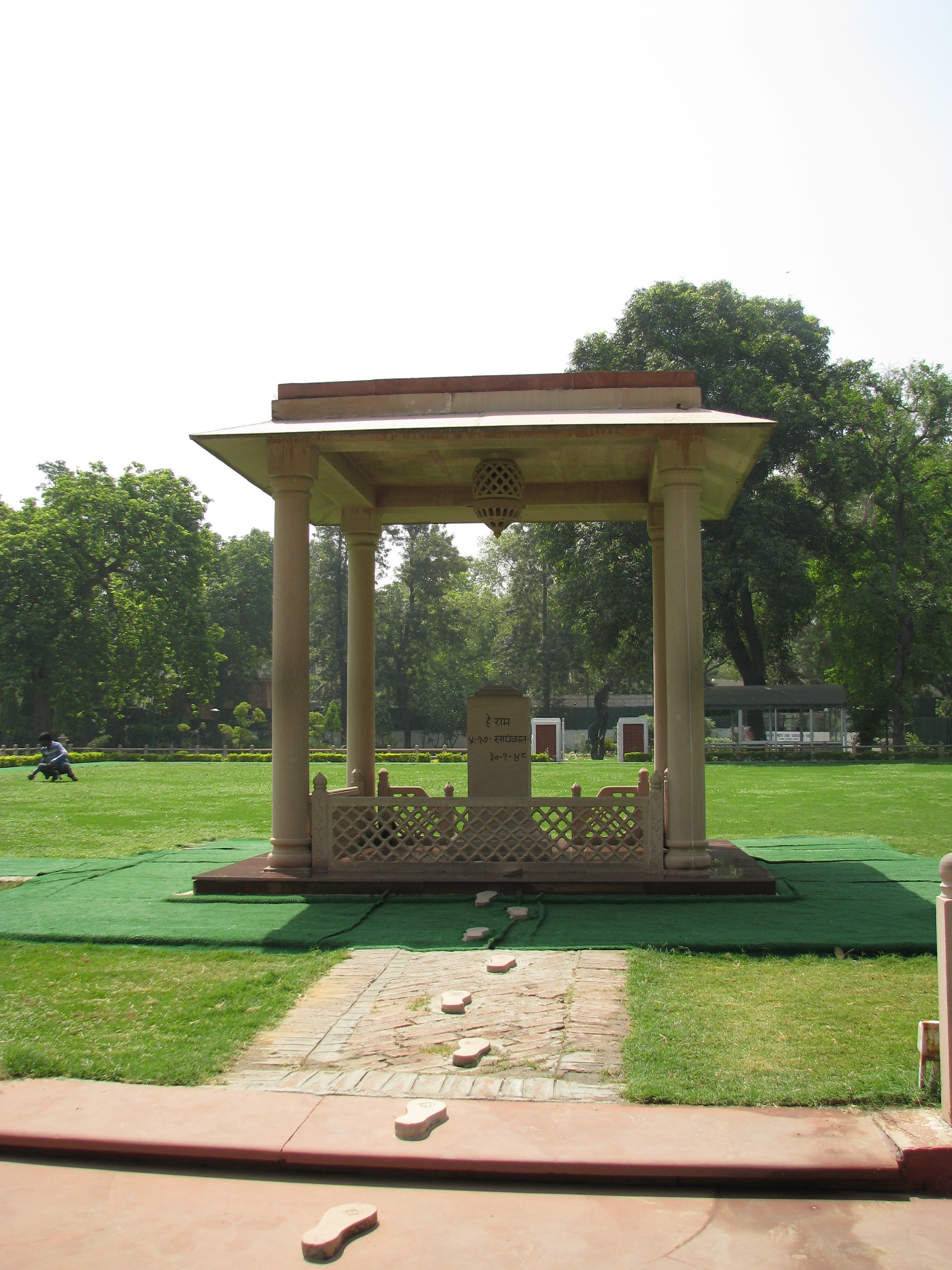
The Martyr's Column at the Gandhi Smriti in New Delhi, marks the spot where he was assassinated

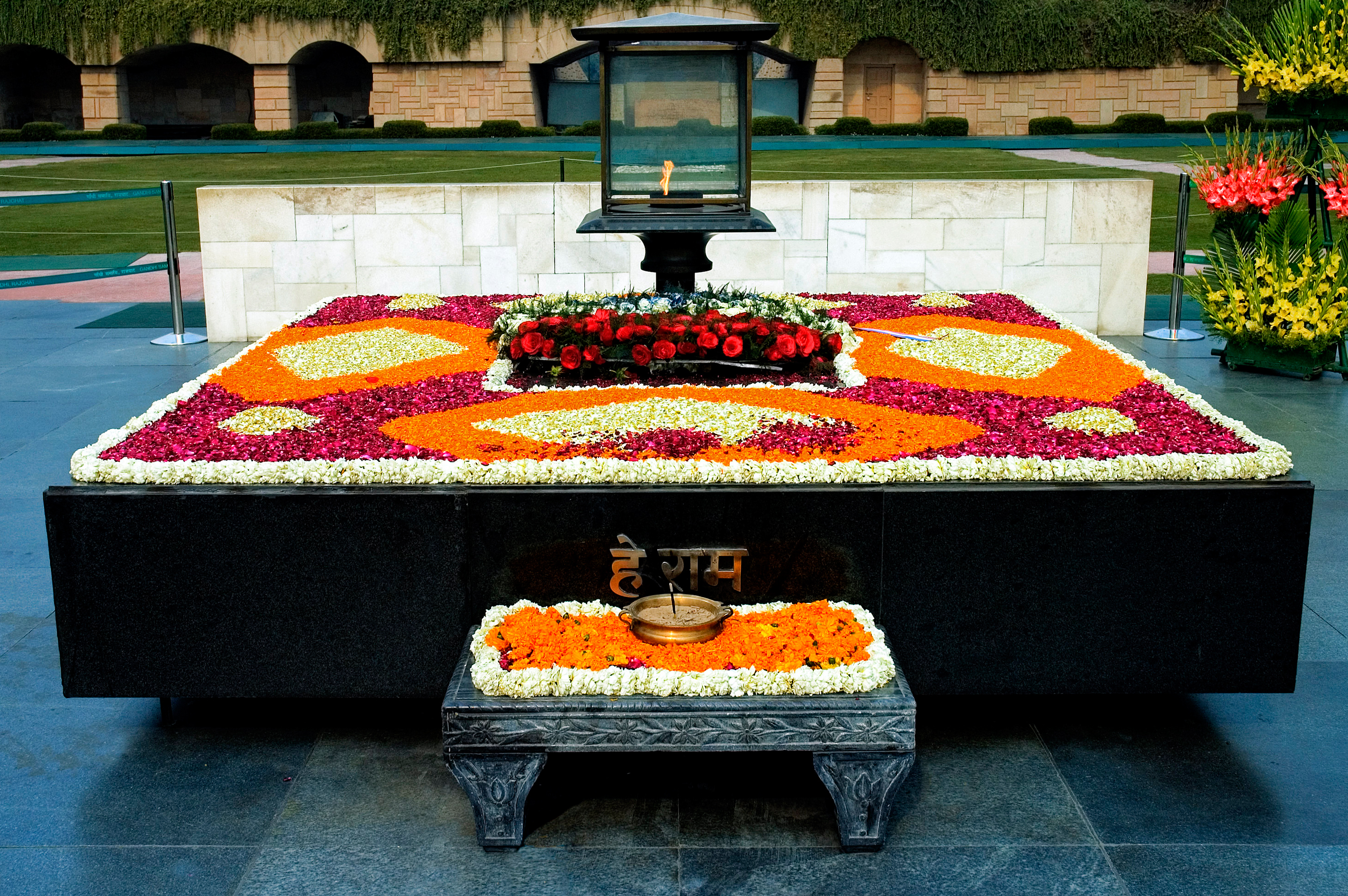
Rajghat in New Delhi, marks the spot of Gandhi's cremation in 1948

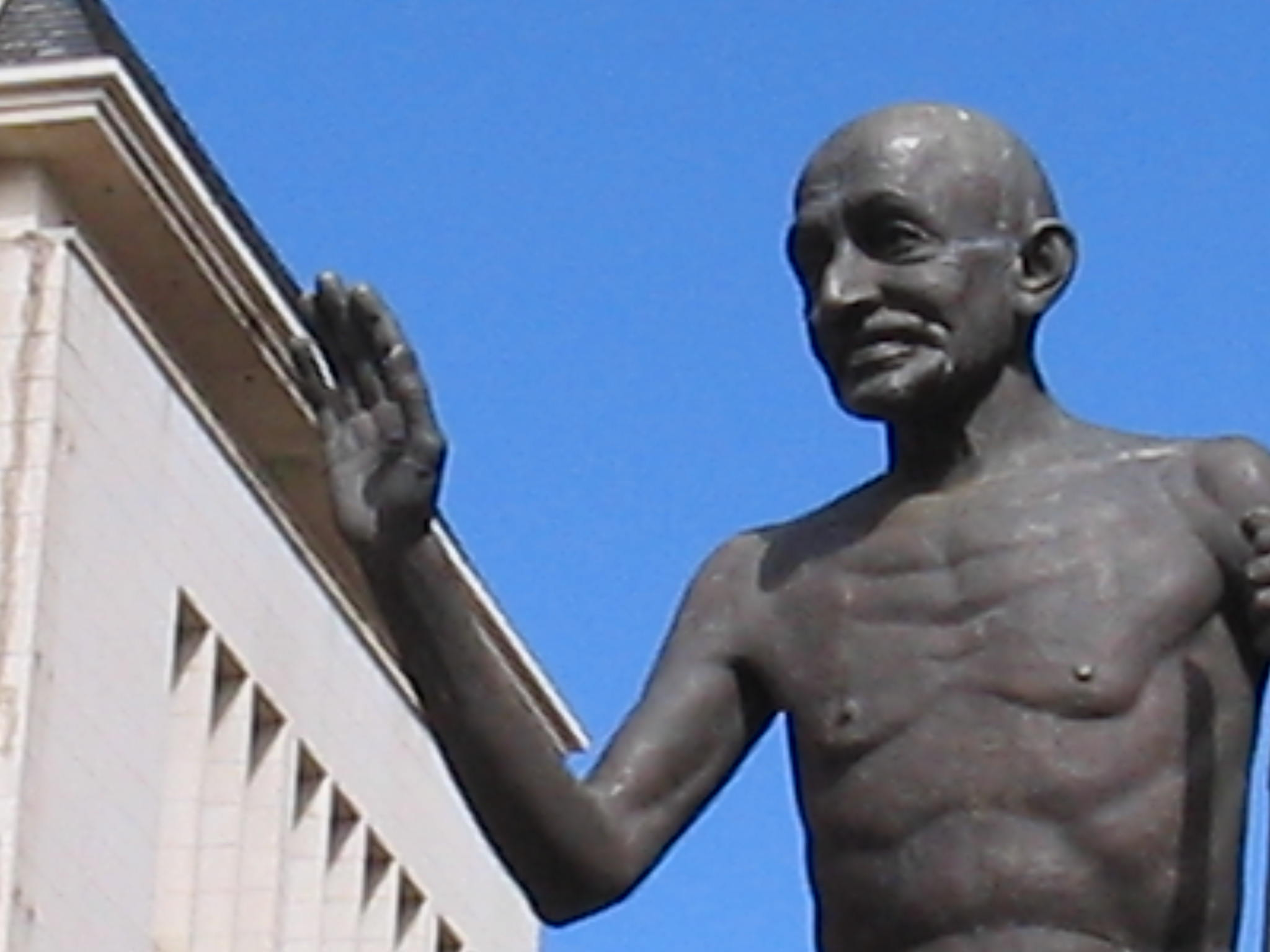
Pietermaritzburg, South Africa

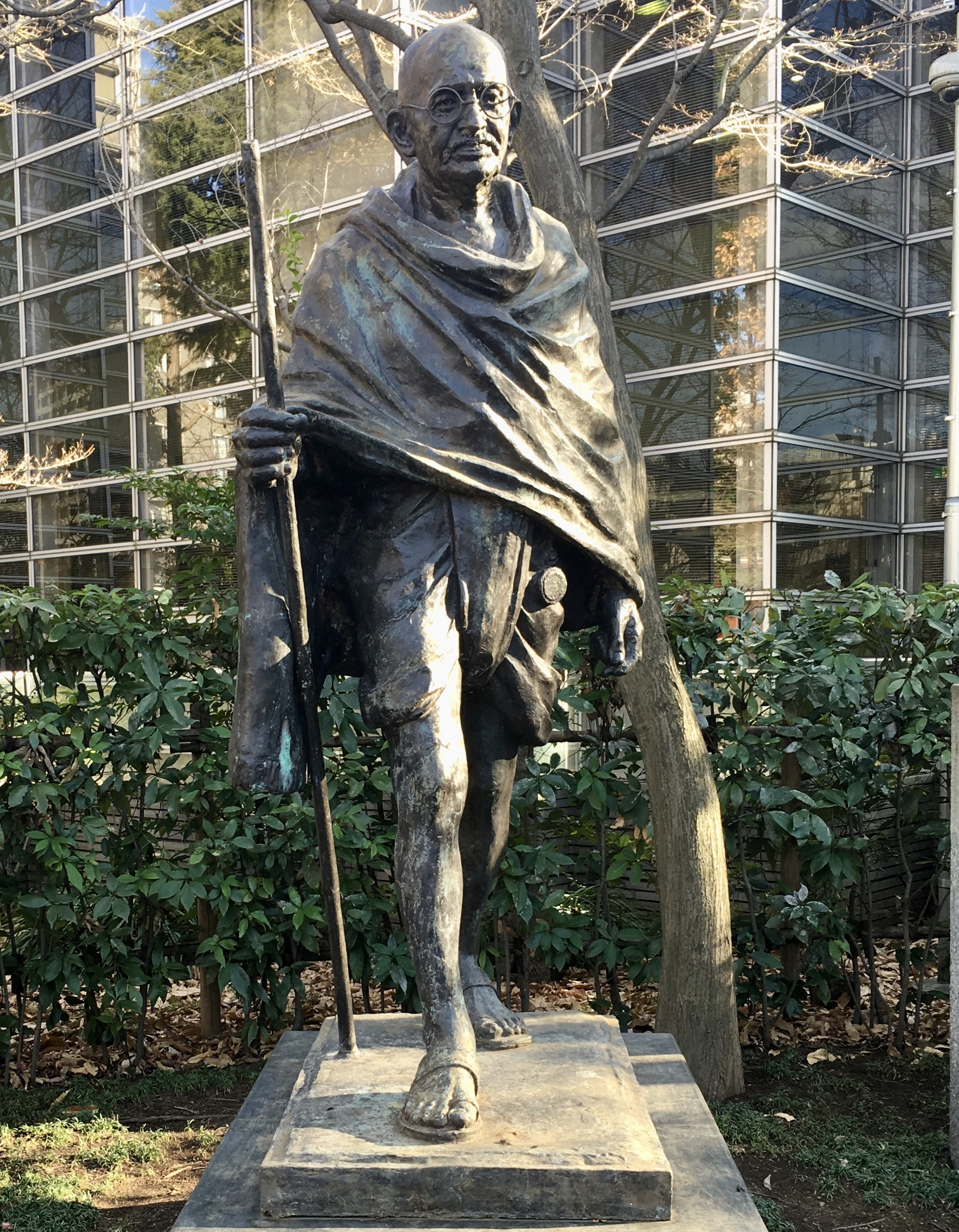
Mahatma Gandhi Statue in Suginami Ward, Tokyo (2015) Japan

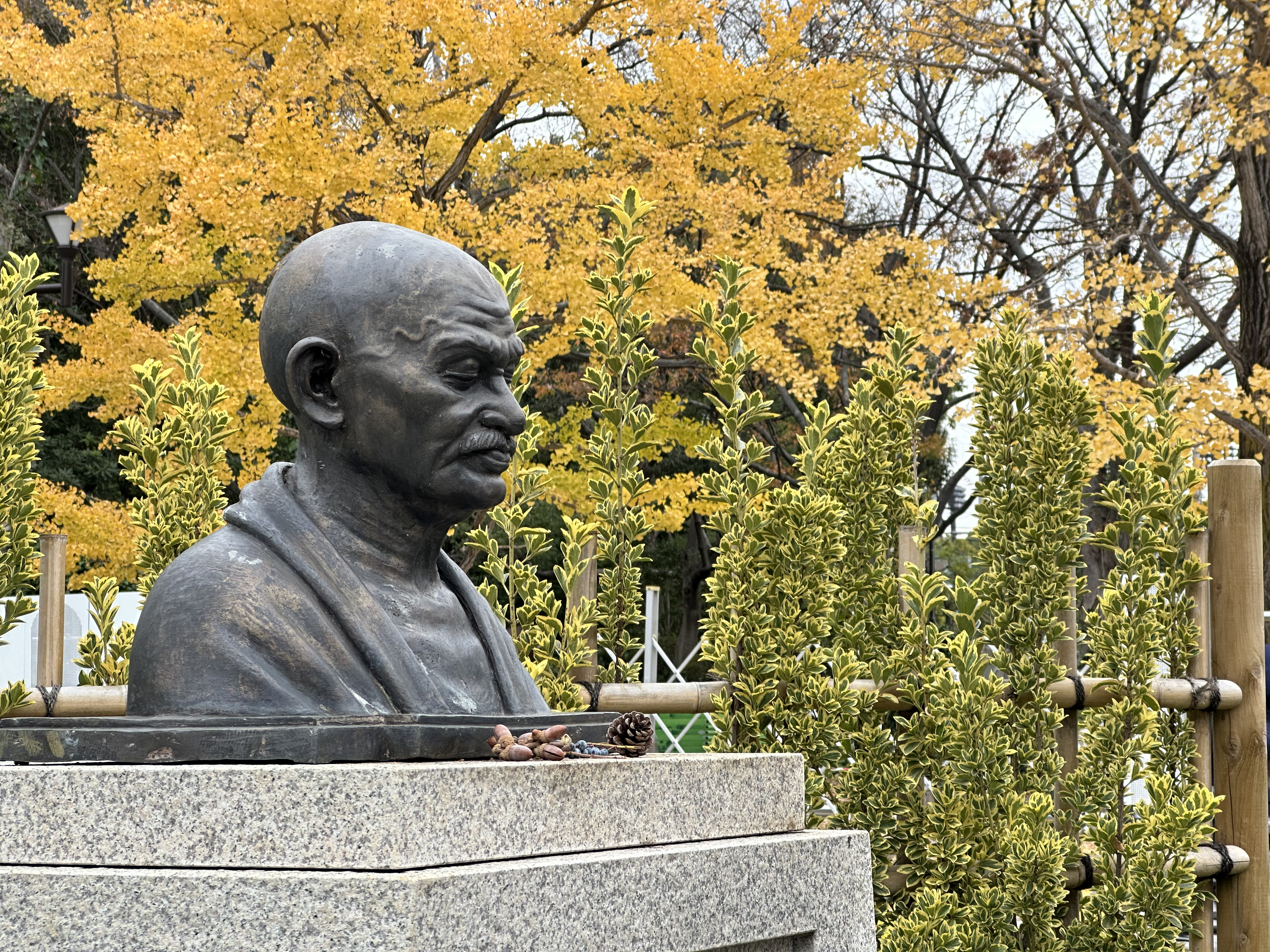
Mahatma Gandhi Statue in Edogawa Ward, Tokyo (2025) Japan

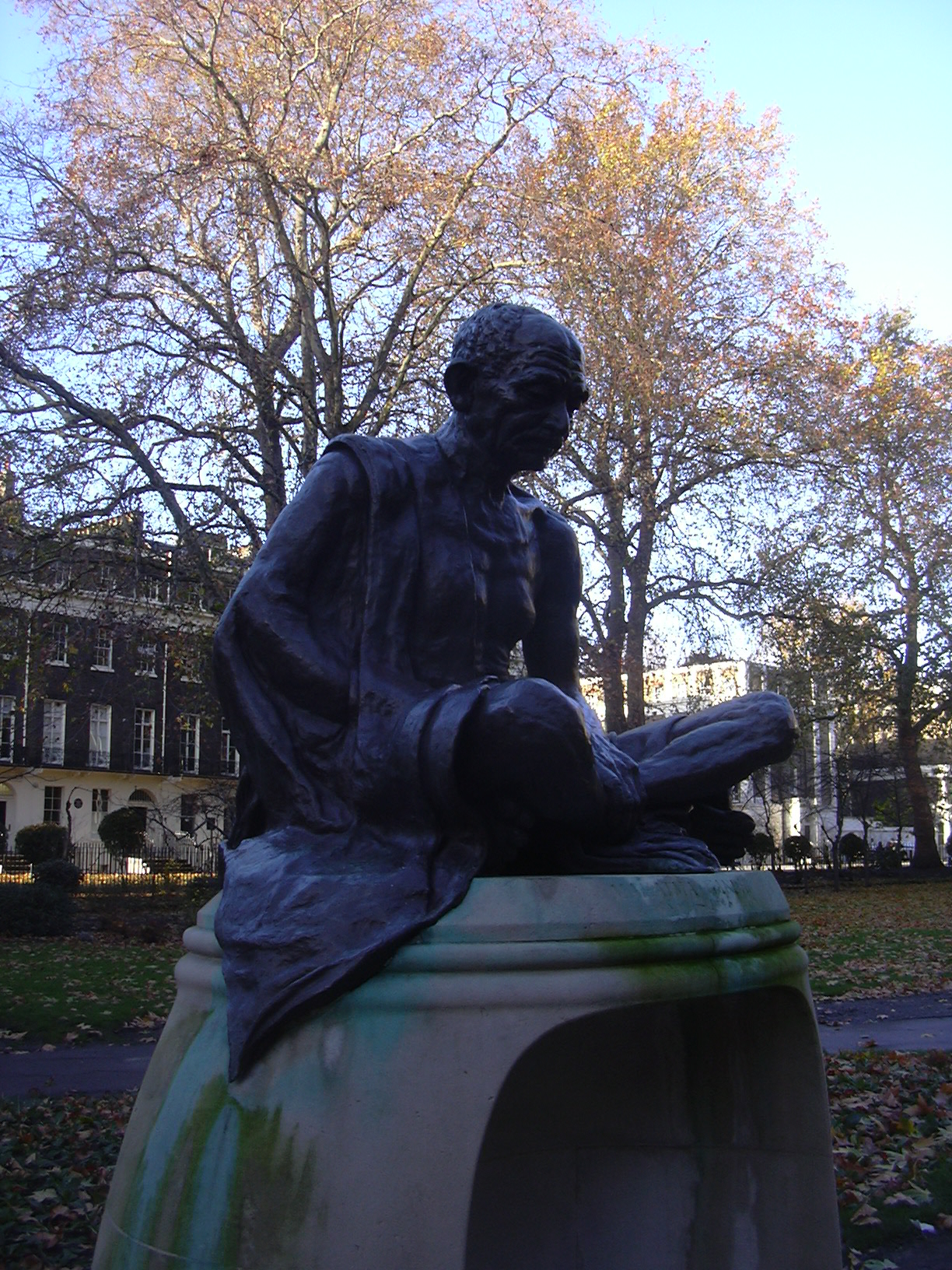
Tavistock Square, London

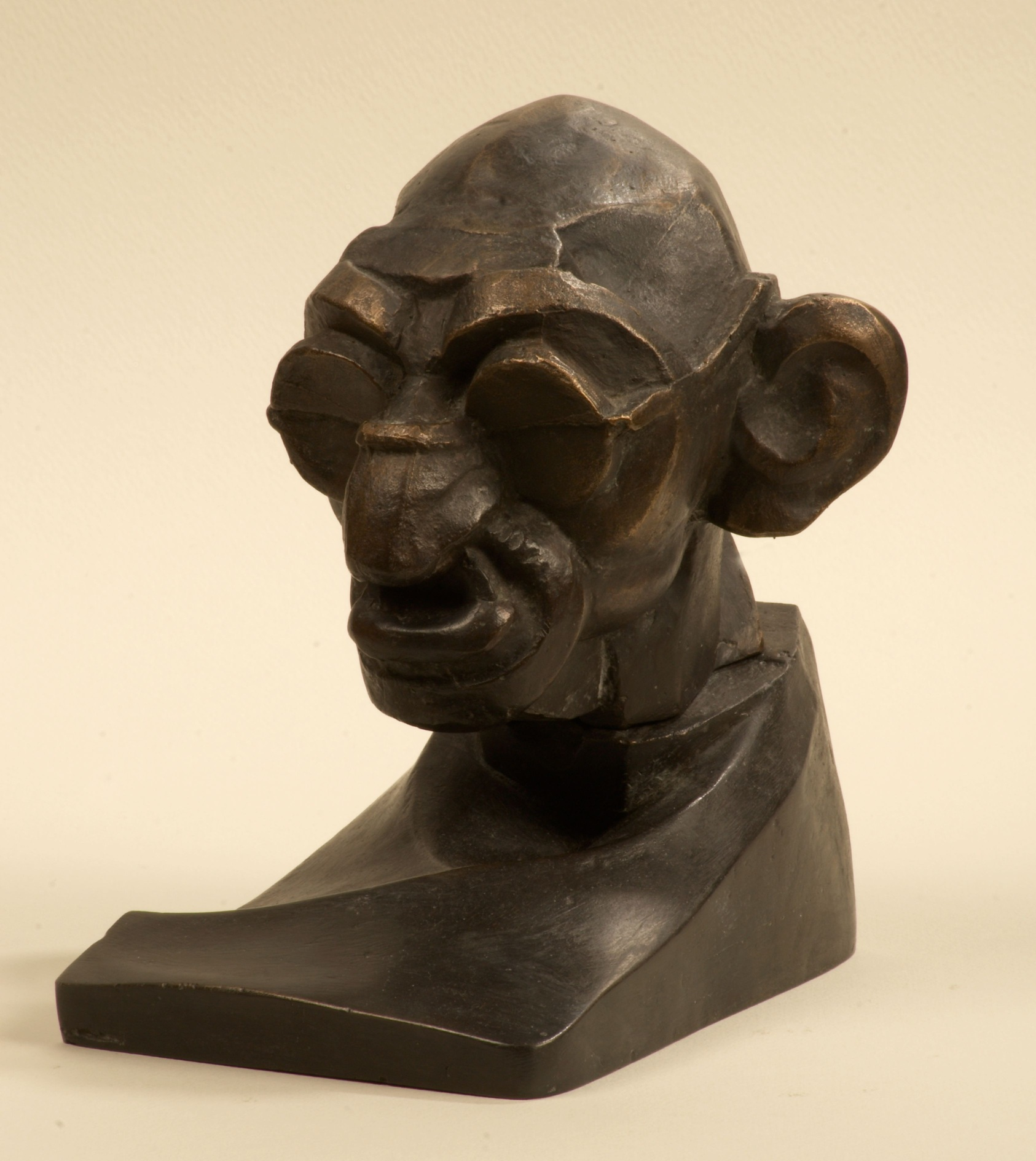
Caricature of Gandhi by Gosławski

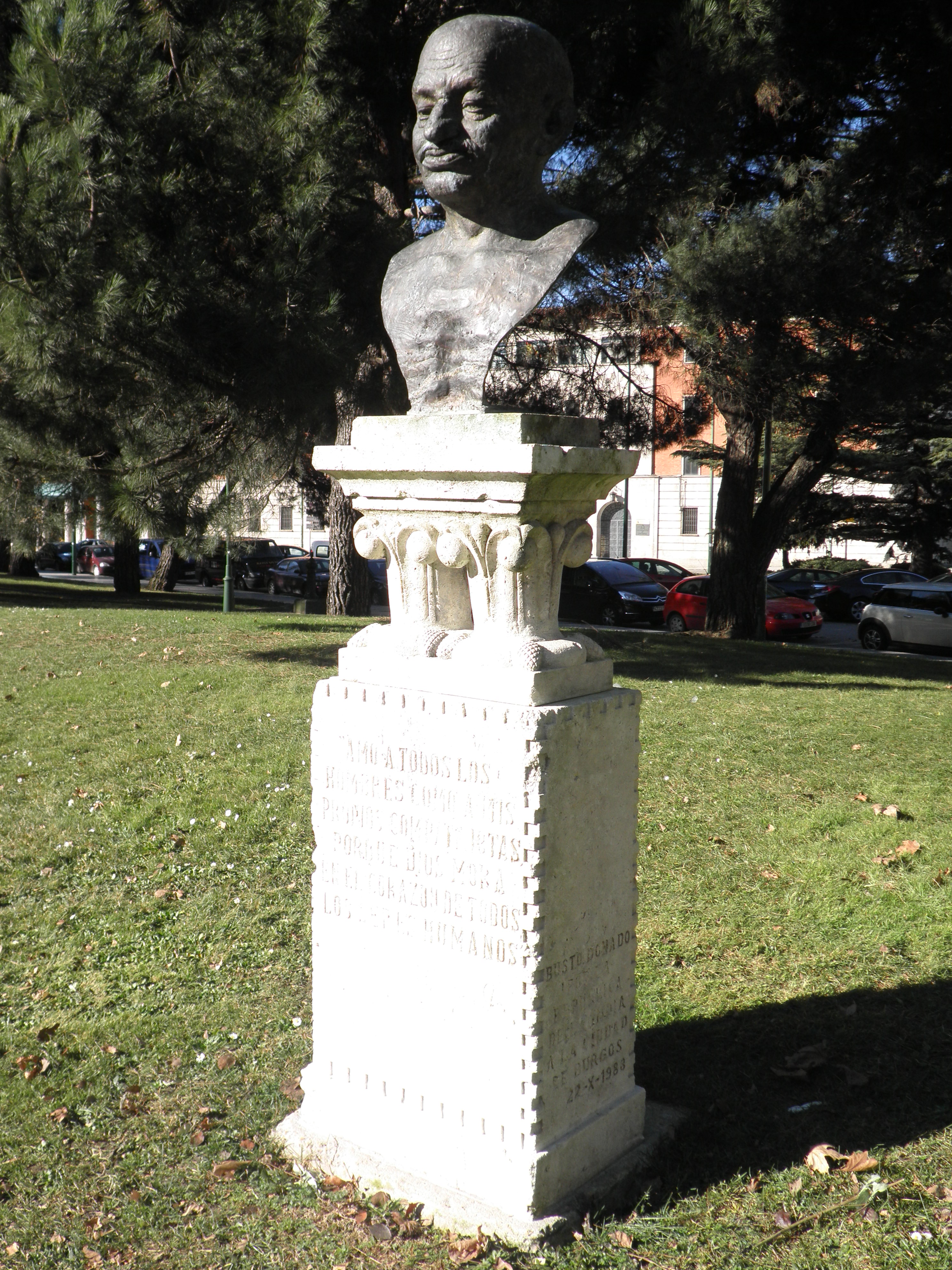
Gandhi bust in Burgos, Spain

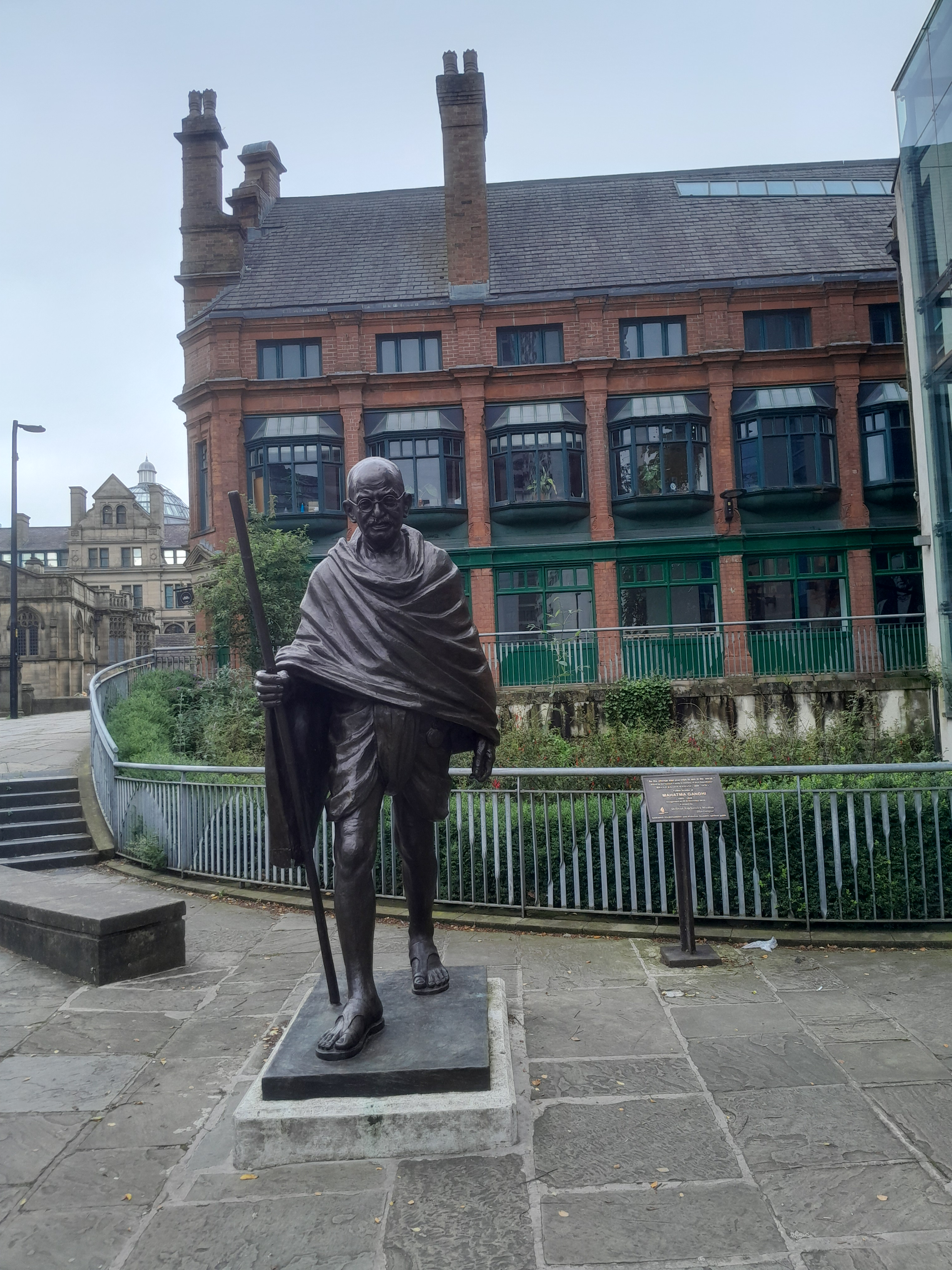
Gandhi statue at Manchester Cathedral

== Music ==
- "Mahatma Gandhi" is used by Cole Porter in his lyrics for the song "You're the Top" which is included in the 1934 musical Anything Goes. In the song, Porter rhymes 'Mahatma Gandhi' with 'Napoleon Brandy.'
- 1954: The patriotic song Sabarmati ke Sant from the Bollywood film Jagriti is dedicated to Mahatma Gandhi
- 2012: "Be the Change (The Story of Mahatma Gandhi)", a mixture of Raga and Hip hop by MC Yogi, released in celebration of Gandhi Jayanti.
- 2013: "Gandhi vs Martin Luther King Jr. Epic Rap Battles of History Season 2", a satirical rap video between Gandhi and MLK depicted by comedians Key and Peele.

== Television ==
- 2002-03: Gandhi Smith is a main character in the animated series Clone High; his depiction on the show was controversial and resulted in its cancellation after only one season. When the show was revived in 2023, Gandhi was excluded from the main cast, though was still referenced by other characters, suggesting a possible return in future seasons.
- 2004: "One World: Telecom Italia 'Gandhi' ": An award-winning television commercial produced by Y&R, Italy and directed by Spike Lee. It depicts Gandhi broadcasting a speech during World War II, reaching audiences through the use of digital technology.

== Theater ==
- The opera Satyāgraha, composed by Philip Glass (in 1980), with a libretto by himself and Constance De Jong is based on Gandhi's experiences in South Africa. The opera's libretto, taken from the Bhagavad Gita, is sung in the original Sanskrit.
- The 1995 Marathi play Gandhi Virudh Gandhi explored the relationship between Gandhi and his son Harilal. The 2007 film, Gandhi, My Father was inspired on the same theme. The 1997 Hindi play Gandhi Ambedkar criticised Gandhi and his principles.
- Me Nathuram Godse Boltoy (Marathi for This is Nathuram Godse speaking, first staged in 1997
- Howard Brenton's Drawing the Line premiered in 2013 at the Hampstead Theatre. A play on the partition of India, it featured Tanveer Ghani as Gandhi.
- A Gujarati-language one-man play Mohan No Masalo, directed by Manoj Shah, premiered in 2015 in Mumbai. It recounts the early years of Gandhi played by Pratik Gandhi.
- In 2016, the National Centre for the Performing Arts (India) premiered Danesh Khambata's Gandhi—The Musical, featuring Chirag Vohra and Abhishek Krishnan as Gandhi.
- In November 2016, the play Yugpurush: Mahatma na Mahatma premiered in Mumbai, India. The play depicts the spiritual guidance that Gandhi received from Shrimad Rajchandra.
- The 2019 play Bharat Bhagya Vidhata, inspired by Pujya Gurudevshri Rakeshbhai and produced by Sangeet Natak Akademi and Shrimad Rajchandra Mission Dharampur takes a look at how Gandhi cultivated the values of truth and non-violence.
- The National Theatre's 2022 season includes Anupama Chandrasekhar's The Father and the Assassin, which tells the story of Godse, styled as "a devout follower of Gandhi [who becomes] his eventual assassin."

== Video games ==
=== Civilization ===
In the Civilization Turn-based strategy series (1991–present), Gandhi appears as the leader of the Indian civilisation starting from the first game in the series Civilization (1996) and all other games in the series excluding spin-offs.

If the player is not playing as the Indian civilisation, the computer makes Gandhi act in much the same way as real life (i.e. peaceful) and will not attack other civilisations unless attacked himself. As part of the series, the technology tree in the games allow both the player's own civilisation and others controlled by the computer to discover nuclear energy and subsequently develop nuclear weapons.

From the first game in the series up to and including Civilization IV (2005), Gandhi does use the weapons during a war (which by his very nature is strictly a defensive war) but not any more than any other peaceful leader (such as Abraham Lincoln, leader of the American civilisation) although it was perceived.

Starting from Civilization V (2010) onwards, a new feature by programmer Jon Shafer was added as a joke where once Gandhi gains nuclear weapons, he will bomb neighbouring civilisation and the player's own. The joke was that Gandhi is famous for his strict adherence to the principle of non-violence and so it would be extremely uncharacteristic of Gandhi to start a war, especially a nuclear war, leading to internet memes about a so-called "Nuclear Gandhi".

Over time, it became a popular misconception that a glitch in the first game and/or the second game, Civilization II (1996) turned Gandhi into a nuclear warmonger under such circumstances. Supposedly, the glitch was caused by an integer overflow error whereby Gandhi's aggression level was set to "1" (the lowest level) and if it lowered again, instead of the non-existent "0", it would instead lower to "255" (the highest level) and make Gandhi very aggressive.

In 2020, the first game's creator, Sid Meier stated that no such glitch was in the first Civilization and the game was not programmed in such a manner as the first game used the programing language C and the second game used C++. In both, those programing languages, all integer variables are signed by default making such a glitch impossible.

== See also ==
- Mahatma Gandhi Series – Series of Indian banknotes
