= Indian 10 Rupee Mahatma Gandhi postage stamp =

Indian postage stamp

Mahatma Gandhi 10 Rs. issue of 1948
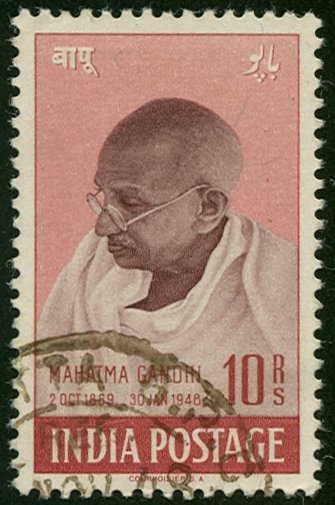
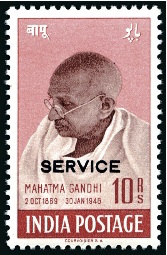
- Country of production: India
- Location of production: Hélio Courvoisier, Geneva, Switzerland
- Date of production: 1948
- Depicts: Mahatma Gandhi
- Nature of rarity: "Service" Overprint - Extremely rare
- No. in existence: 250,000 normal stamps, "Service" Overprint - 100, "Service" Overprint in Private Collections - 8
- Face value: 10 Rupees

The 10 rupees postage stamp depicting Mahatma Gandhi, issued by India in 1948, is one of India's most famous stamps. On 15 August 1948, on the occasion of the first anniversary of India's Independence Day, Gandhi was honored as the first Indian to be depicted on stamps of India. A set of 100 of these stamps was overprinted with the word "Service" and provided only to the Governor General of India for his official use. The 10 Rupees "Service" overprinted stamp is one of India's rarest and most highly valued stamps.

== History ==
The original plan was to issue a set of stamps depicting Mahatma Gandhi ("Bapu", or "father" in Hindi), in January 1948. The India Security Press in Nashik was entrusted with the task of producing a set of 4 stamps. But before the stamps were issued, Gandhi was assassinated. The Indian Government decided to print these stamps as a memorial, using photogravure press, and hence had to employ the services of the Swiss printers, Helio Courvoisier, Sa. LaChaux De Fonds, instead of the India Security Press. The word "Bapu" was printed on the stamp in Hindi and Urdu languages as a symbol of communal harmony. Four stamps with denominations 1.5 annas, 3.5 annas, 12 annas and 10 rupees were issued. One of the stamps of the set was issued with a very high price of 10 Rs., out of reach of the common populace in India. The stamps were issued on 15 August 1948, on the occasion of the first anniversary of India's Independence Day.

== Technical details ==
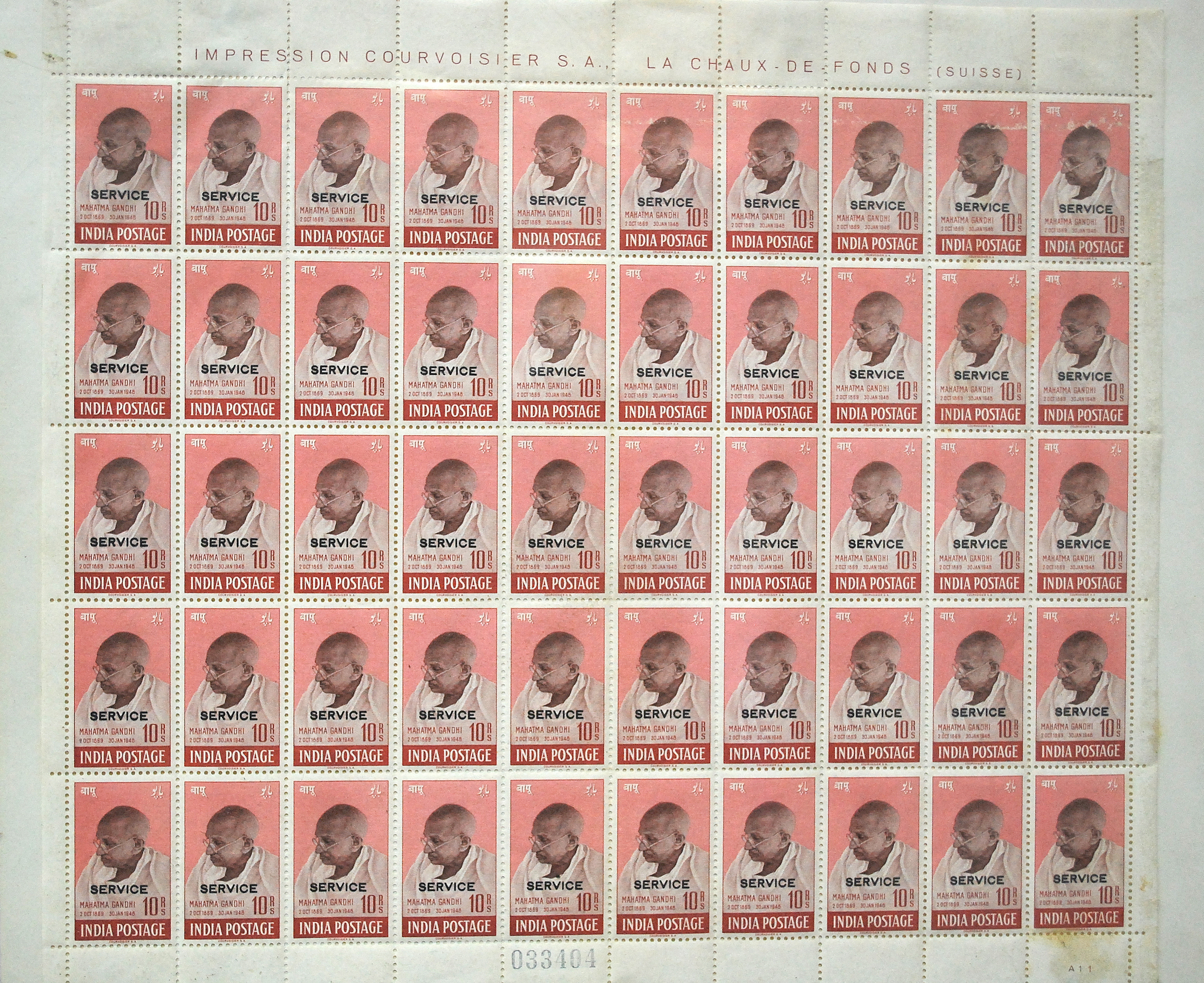
Photo of the Sheet of 10 Rupees Mahatma Gandhi Stamp Overprinted Service, which was exhibited at International Philately Exhibition Indipex 2011 at New Delhi, India

The 10 Rs. stamp depicted Bapu in a grey colour with a reddish-brown background. A total of 250,000 stamps were printed in sheets of 50 stamps, 5 rows of 10 stamps each, with a perforation of 11.5 mm. Forgeries of both the stamps, and of and first day covers bearing them, are known.

== Service issue ==
A set of stamps over-printed as "Service" was issued to the Government of India for official purposes. Only 100 Mahatma Gandhi 10 Rs. stamps were overprinted with "Service" and issued for the use of C. Rajagopalachari, the Governor General of India. Of the hundred stamps that were overprinted with "Service", a few were given to dignitaries, while most, including an intact sheet of 50, remain at the National Archives, Postal Museums, etc. The 2006 book by Dr. Reuben Ramkissoon and Dr. Rajagopalan reports that fewer than eight copies of the Gandhi 10 Rs Service stamps reside in private hands. The 1948 "Service" set which was auctioned for 38,000 euros in the David Feldman auction sale on 5 October 2007. In 2011 David Feldman sold an example for €144,000 and suggests that only 18 are known. In April 2017, Stanley Gbbons reported that a block of four overprinted 10 Rs Service stamps was sold to a private collector in Australia for £500,000 at an auction in the UK. Forgeries of the overprint are known.

== See also ==
- List of artistic depictions of Mahatma Gandhi
