= Mahatma: Life of Gandhi, 1869–1948 =

- Directed by: Vithalbhai Jhaveri
- Written by: Vithalbhai Jhaveri
- Produced by: The Gandhi National Memorial Fund; Films Division of India
- Release date: 1968
- Running time: 330 minutes
- Country: India
- Language: English

Mahatma: Life of Gandhi, 1869–1948 is a 1968 documentary biography film, detailing the life of Mahatma Gandhi. The film was produced by The Gandhi National Memorial Fund in cooperation with the Films Division of the Government of India, and was directed and scripted by Vithalbhai Jhaveri. Jhaveri also provides the commentary throughout the film. The film is in black and white, contains 33 reels (14 chapters), and runs for 330 minutes.

The film was made to seek to tell the life story Gandhi, and his incessant search for Truth. The film contains animation, live photography and old prints to provide an integrated image of his life. The story itself is narrated using mostly Gandhi's own words.

There are several versions of the film. There is the 5 hour version in English, a shorter version which runs for 2 hours and 16 minutes, and an even shorter version which runs for an hour. A Hindi version exists, running for 2 hours and 20 minutes, and a German version at 1 hour and 44 minutes.

== See also ==
- List of artistic depictions of Mohandas Karamchand Gandhi
- List of longest films by running time
- Vithalbhai Jhaveri
- Dinanath Gopal Tendulkar
