= Dinanath Gopal Tendulkar =

Indian writer and filmmaker (1909–1972)

D. G. Tendulkar
- Born: 1909; Ratnagiri, Bombay Presidency, British India
- Died: 1972 (aged 62–63)
- Education: University of Cambridge, University of Marburg and University of Göttingen
- Writing career
- Language: English
- Genre: Biography
- Notable work: Mahatma: Life of Mohandas Karamchand Gandhi
- Notable awards: Padma Bhushan (refused)

Dinanath Gopal Tendulkar (1909–1972) was an Indian writer and documentary film maker. He is most well known as the author of an eight-volume biography of Mahatma Gandhi, titled Mahatma: Life of Mohandas Karamchand Gandhi. He was also a close associate of Vithalbhai Jhaveri and collaborated for the documentary film, Mahatma: Life of Gandhi, 1869–1948. He died on Monday, June 12, 1972.

== Early life ==
He was born in Ratnagiri, Maharashtra (Bombay Presidency as it was called then) and was educated first at University of Cambridge and then at Universities Marburg and Göttingen.

== Writer ==
Tendulkar gained international notability for writing the eight-volume biography of Mahatma Gandhi, titled Mahatma: Life of Mohandas Karamchand Gandhi. His most noted work is his Gandhi biography, which was first published in 1951 with a foreword by the then Prime Minister, Jawaharlal Nehru. He was awarded the Padma Bhushan (third highest civilian honour in the Republic of India) decoration by the then President of India, Rajendra Prasad. He refused the award and asked for (and got) a watch instead. Tendulkar's 1967 biography of Khan Abdul Gaffar Khan – Faith is a Battle is among the few very biographies written about Gaffar Khan. He was appointed as a member of the National Book Trust of India, when it was first established in 1957. His other works include 30 months in Russia (1943), Gandhi in Champaran (1957) and Soviet Sanskriti. He has also edited two books – Jawaharlal Nehru in pictures (1967) and Gandhiji:His life and works (1944). Tendulkar was also a documentary film maker who had trained under Sergei Eisenstein in Moscow. Tendulkar and his fellow European trained film makers – P. V. Pathy and K. S. Hirlekar – are considered to be the pioneers of documentary film making in India.

== Bibliography ==
- Mahatma: Life of Mohandas Karamchand Gandhi
- 30 months in Russia
- Faith is a Battle (a biography of Khan Abdul Gaffar Khan)
- (ed.) Jawaharlal Nehru in pictures
- Gandhi in Champaran
- Soviet Sanskriti
- (ed.)Gandhiji:His life and works
