= Mahatma Gandhi: 20th Century Prophet =

1953 film

- Directed by: Stanley Neal
- Screenplay by: Quentin Reynolds
- Produced by: Stanley Neal
- Starring: Quentin Reynolds
- Music by: Charles Koff
- Production companies: American Academy of Asian Studies; Stanley Neal Productions Inc.
- Distributed by: United Artists
- Release date: April 28, 1953
- Running time: 81 minutes
- Country: United States
- Language: English

Mahatma Gandhi: 20th Century Prophet is a 1953 American documentary film directed by Stanley Neal and written by Quentin Reynolds. The documentary follows the life of Mahatma Gandhi. The film was released on April 28, 1953, by United Artists.

== See also ==
- List of artistic depictions of Mahatma Gandhi
