= Vithalbhai Jhaveri =

Indian independence activist and filmmaker (1916–1985)

- Born: 1916; India
- Died: 1985 (aged 68–69)
- Occupations: Indian independence activist Filmmaker; Photographer; Writer
- Awards: Padma Bhushan

Vithalbhai Jhaveri (1916–1985) was an Indian independence activist, filmmaker, photographer, writer and a close associate of Mahatma Gandhi. He documented Gandhi, since the Dandi March till his death in 1948, through numerous photographs which were displayed at many exhibitions and used in several literary works. Gandhi-A Photo Biography, a book by Peter Rühe, uses several of his photographs and he was a collaborator of Dinanath Gopal Tendulkar, in the latter's biography of Mahatma Gandhi, Mahatma; Life of Mohandas Karamchand Gandhi. His 330-minute documentary on Gandhi, Mahatma: Life of Gandhi, 1869–1948, covers the Indian leader's life through 14 chapters. The Government of India awarded him the third highest civilian honour of the Padma Bhushan, in 1969, for his contributions to Literature and education.

== See also ==
- Mahatma: Life of Gandhi, 1869–1948
